= List of Oonopidae species =

This page lists all described genera and species of the spider family Oonopidae. As of April 2019, the World Spider Catalog accepts 1874 species in 115 genera:

== A ==
=== Amazoonops ===
Amazoonops Ott, Ruiz, Brescovit & Bonaldo, 2017

- Amazoonops almeirim Ott, Ruiz, Brescovit & Bonaldo, 2017 — Brazil
- Amazoonops cachimbo Ott, Ruiz, Brescovit & Bonaldo, 2017 — Brazil
- Amazoonops caxiuana Ott, Ruiz, Brescovit & Bonaldo, 2017 (type) — Brazil
- Amazoonops ducke Ott, Ruiz, Brescovit & Bonaldo, 2017 — Brazil
- Amazoonops juruti Ott, Ruiz, Brescovit & Bonaldo, 2017 — Brazil

=== Anophthalmoonops ===
Anophthalmoonops Benoit, 1976

- Anophthalmoonops thoracotermitis Benoit, 1976 (type) — Angola

=== Antoonops ===
Antoonops Fannes & Jocqué, 2008

- Antoonops bouaflensis Fannes & Jocqué, 2008 — Ivory Coast
- Antoonops corbulo Fannes & Jocqué, 2008 (type) — Ivory Coast, Ghana
- Antoonops iita Fannes & Jocqué, 2008 — Nigeria
- Antoonops kamieli Fannes, 2013 — Ivory Coast
- Antoonops nebula Fannes & Jocqué, 2008 — Ghana
- Antoonops sarae Fannes, 2013 — Cameroon

=== Aposphragisma ===
Aposphragisma Thoma, 2014

- Aposphragisma baltenspergerae Thoma, 2014 — Borneo
- Aposphragisma borgulai Thoma, 2014 — Indonesia (Sumatra)
- Aposphragisma brunomanseri Thoma, 2014 — Borneo
- Aposphragisma confluens Thoma, 2014 — Borneo
- Aposphragisma dayak Thoma, 2014 — Borneo
- Aposphragisma dentatum Thoma, 2014 — Borneo
- Aposphragisma draconigenum Thoma, 2014 — Malaysia
- Aposphragisma globosum Fardiansah & Dupérré, 2018 — Indonesia (Sumatra)
- Aposphragisma hausammannae Thoma, 2014 — Vietnam
- Aposphragisma helvetiorum Thoma, 2014 (type) — Borneo
- Aposphragisma jambi Fardiansah & Dupérré, 2018 — Indonesia (Sumatra)
- Aposphragisma kolleri Thoma, 2014 — Borneo
- Aposphragisma menzi Thoma, 2014 — Borneo
- Aposphragisma monoceros Thoma, 2014 — Borneo
- Aposphragisma nocturnum Thoma, 2014 — Borneo
- Aposphragisma retifer Thoma, 2014 — Borneo
- Aposphragisma rimba Thoma, 2014 — Borneo
- Aposphragisma salewskii Thoma, 2014 — Malaysia, Singapore
- Aposphragisma scimitar Thoma, 2014 — Borneo
- Aposphragisma sepilok Thoma, 2014 — Borneo
- Aposphragisma stannum Thoma, 2014 — Singapore
- Aposphragisma sumatra Fardiansah & Dupérré, 2018 — Indonesia (Sumatra)

=== Aprusia ===
Aprusia Simon, 1893

- Aprusia kataragama Grismado & Deeleman, 2011 — Sri Lanka
- Aprusia kerala Grismado & Deeleman, 2011 — India
- Aprusia koslandensis Ranasinghe & Benjamin, 2018 — Sri Lanka
- Aprusia rawanaellensis Ranasinghe & Benjamin, 2018 — Sri Lanka
- Aprusia strenuus Simon, 1893 (type) — Sri Lanka
- Aprusia vankhedei Ranasinghe & Benjamin, 2018 — Sri Lanka
- Aprusia veddah Grismado & Deeleman, 2011 — Sri Lanka
- Aprusia vestigator (Simon, 1893) — Sri Lanka

=== Aschnaoonops ===
Aschnaoonops Makhan & Ezzatpanah, 2011

- Aschnaoonops alban Platnick, Dupérré, Berniker & Bonaldo, 2013 — Colombia
- Aschnaoonops aquada Platnick, Dupérré, Berniker & Bonaldo, 2013 — Venezuela
- Aschnaoonops aschnae Makhan & Ezzatpanah, 2011 (type) — Suriname
- Aschnaoonops belem Platnick, Dupérré, Berniker & Bonaldo, 2013 — Brazil
- Aschnaoonops bocono Platnick, Dupérré, Berniker & Bonaldo, 2013 — Venezuela
- Aschnaoonops caninde Platnick, Dupérré, Berniker & Bonaldo, 2013 — Brazil
- Aschnaoonops chingaza Platnick, Dupérré, Berniker & Bonaldo, 2013 — Colombia
- Aschnaoonops chorro Platnick, Dupérré, Berniker & Bonaldo, 2013 — Venezuela
- Aschnaoonops cosanga Platnick, Dupérré, Berniker & Bonaldo, 2013 — Ecuador
- Aschnaoonops cristalina Platnick, Dupérré, Berniker & Bonaldo, 2013 — Venezuela
- Aschnaoonops gorda Platnick, Dupérré, Berniker & Bonaldo, 2013 — Virgin Is.
- Aschnaoonops huila Platnick, Dupérré, Berniker & Bonaldo, 2013 — Colombia
- Aschnaoonops indio Platnick, Dupérré, Berniker & Bonaldo, 2013 — Venezuela
- Aschnaoonops jaji Platnick, Dupérré, Berniker & Bonaldo, 2013 — Venezuela
- Aschnaoonops jatun Platnick, Dupérré, Berniker & Bonaldo, 2013 — Ecuador
- Aschnaoonops leticia Platnick, Dupérré, Berniker & Bonaldo, 2013 — Colombia
- Aschnaoonops malkini Platnick, Dupérré, Berniker & Bonaldo, 2013 — Brazil
- Aschnaoonops margaretae Platnick, Dupérré, Berniker & Bonaldo, 2013 — Venezuela
- Aschnaoonops marshalli Platnick, Dupérré, Berniker & Bonaldo, 2013 — Ecuador
- Aschnaoonops marta Platnick, Dupérré, Berniker & Bonaldo, 2013 — Colombia
- Aschnaoonops masneri Platnick, Dupérré, Berniker & Bonaldo, 2013 — Venezuela
- Aschnaoonops merida Platnick, Dupérré, Berniker & Bonaldo, 2013 — Venezuela
- Aschnaoonops meta Platnick, Dupérré, Berniker & Bonaldo, 2013 — Colombia
- Aschnaoonops orito Platnick, Dupérré, Berniker & Bonaldo, 2013 — Colombia
- Aschnaoonops paez Platnick, Dupérré, Berniker & Bonaldo, 2013 — Colombia
- Aschnaoonops pamplona Platnick, Dupérré, Berniker & Bonaldo, 2013 — Colombia
- Aschnaoonops pedro Platnick, Dupérré, Berniker & Bonaldo, 2013 — Colombia
- Aschnaoonops pira Platnick, Dupérré, Berniker & Bonaldo, 2013 — Colombia
- Aschnaoonops propinquus (Keyserling, 1881) — Colombia
- Aschnaoonops ramirezi Platnick, Dupérré, Berniker & Bonaldo, 2013 — Ecuador
- Aschnaoonops silvae Platnick, Dupérré, Berniker & Bonaldo, 2013 — Colombia, Ecuador, Peru
- Aschnaoonops similis (Keyserling, 1881) — Colombia
- Aschnaoonops simla (Chickering, 1968) — Trinidad
- Aschnaoonops simoni Platnick, Dupérré, Berniker & Bonaldo, 2013 — Venezuela
- Aschnaoonops tachira Platnick, Dupérré, Berniker & Bonaldo, 2013 — Venezuela
- Aschnaoonops tariba Platnick, Dupérré, Berniker & Bonaldo, 2013 — Venezuela
- Aschnaoonops teleferico Platnick, Dupérré, Berniker & Bonaldo, 2013 — Venezuela
- Aschnaoonops tiputini Platnick, Dupérré, Berniker & Bonaldo, 2013 — Ecuador
- Aschnaoonops trujillo Platnick, Dupérré, Berniker & Bonaldo, 2013 — Venezuela
- Aschnaoonops villalba Platnick, Dupérré, Berniker & Bonaldo, 2013 — Puerto Rico
- Aschnaoonops yasuni Platnick, Dupérré, Berniker & Bonaldo, 2013 — Ecuador

=== Australoonops ===
Australoonops Hewitt, 1915

- Australoonops granulatus Hewitt, 1915 (type) — South Africa
- Australoonops haddadi Platnick & Dupérré, 2010 — South Africa, Mozambique
- Australoonops skaife Platnick & Dupérré, 2010 — South Africa

== B ==
=== Bannana ===
Bannana

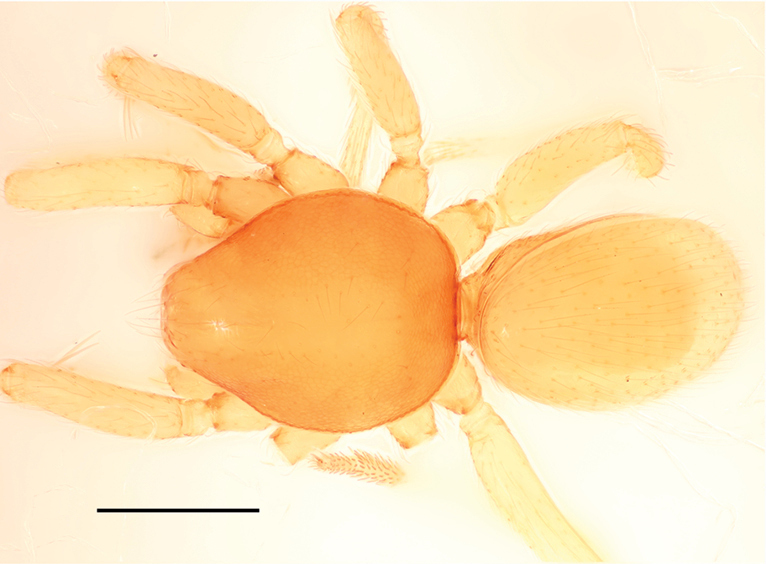
Bannana crassispina, male

Bannana Tong & Li, 2015

- Bannana crassispina Tong & Li, 2015 (type) — China
- Bannana parvula Tong & Li, 2015 — China

=== Bidysderina ===
Bidysderina Platnick, Dupérré, Berniker & Bonaldo, 2013

- Bidysderina bififa Platnick, Dupérré, Berniker & Bonaldo, 2013 — Ecuador
- Bidysderina cayambe Platnick, Dupérré, Berniker & Bonaldo, 2013 — Ecuador
- Bidysderina niarchos Platnick, Dupérré, Berniker & Bonaldo, 2013 — Ecuador
- Bidysderina perdido Platnick, Dupérré, Berniker & Bonaldo, 2013 (type) — Ecuador
- Bidysderina wagra Platnick, Dupérré, Berniker & Bonaldo, 2013 — Ecuador

=== Bipoonops ===
Bipoonops Bolzern, 2014

- Bipoonops baobab Bolzern, 2014 — Ecuador
- Bipoonops lansa Dupérré & Tapia, 2017 — Ecuador
- Bipoonops pilan Dupérré & Tapia, 2017 — Ecuador
- Bipoonops pucuna Bolzern, 2014 (type) — Ecuador
- Bipoonops tsachila Bolzern, 2014 — Ecuador

=== Birabenella ===
Birabenella Grismado, 2010

- Birabenella argentina (Birabén, 1955) — Argentina
- Birabenella chincha Piacentini, Grismado & Ramírez, 2017 — Peru
- Birabenella elqui Grismado, 2010 — Chile
- Birabenella homonota Grismado, 2010 (type) — Chile
- Birabenella kamanchaca Piacentini, Grismado & Ramírez, 2017 — Chile
- Birabenella pizarroi Grismado, 2010 — Chile
- Birabenella portai Piacentini, Grismado & Ramírez, 2017 — Argentina

=== Blanioonops ===
Blanioonops Simon & Fage, 1922

- Blanioonops patellaris Simon & Fage, 1922 (type) — East Africa

=== Brignolia ===
Brignolia Dumitrescu & Georgescu, 1983

- Brignolia ambigua (Simon, 1893) — Sri Lanka
- Brignolia ankhu Platnick, Dupérré, Ott & Kranz-Baltensperger, 2011 — Nepal
- Brignolia assam Platnick, Dupérré, Ott & Kranz-Baltensperger, 2011 — India, Nepal
- Brignolia bengal Platnick, Dupérré, Ott & Kranz-Baltensperger, 2011 — India
- Brignolia bowleri (Saaristo, 2002) — Seychelles
- Brignolia cardamom Platnick, Dupérré, Ott & Kranz-Baltensperger, 2011 — India
- Brignolia carlmulleri Ranasinghe & Benjamin, 2016 — Sri Lanka
- Brignolia chumphae Platnick, Dupérré, Ott & Kranz-Baltensperger, 2011 — Thailand
- Brignolia cobre Platnick, Dupérré, Ott & Kranz-Baltensperger, 2011 — USA, Caribbean
- Brignolia dasysterna Platnick, Dupérré, Ott & Kranz-Baltensperger, 2011 — USA
- Brignolia diablo Platnick, Dupérré, Ott & Kranz-Baltensperger, 2011 — Thailand
- Brignolia elongata Platnick, Dupérré, Ott & Kranz-Baltensperger, 2011 — Borneo
- Brignolia gading Platnick, Dupérré, Ott & Kranz-Baltensperger, 2011 — Borneo
- Brignolia jog Platnick, Dupérré, Ott & Kranz-Baltensperger, 2011 — India
- Brignolia kaikatty Platnick, Dupérré, Ott & Kranz-Baltensperger, 2011 — India
- Brignolia kapit Platnick, Dupérré, Ott & Kranz-Baltensperger, 2011 — Borneo
- Brignolia karnataka Platnick, Dupérré, Ott & Kranz-Baltensperger, 2011 — India
- Brignolia kodaik Platnick, Dupérré, Ott & Kranz-Baltensperger, 2011 — India
- Brignolia kumily Platnick, Dupérré, Ott & Kranz-Baltensperger, 2011 — India
- Brignolia mapha Platnick, Dupérré, Ott & Kranz-Baltensperger, 2011 — Thailand
- Brignolia meemure Ranasinghe & Benjamin, 2016 — Sri Lanka
- Brignolia nigripalpis (Simon, 1893) — India, Sri Lanka
- Brignolia nilgiri Platnick, Dupérré, Ott & Kranz-Baltensperger, 2011 — India
- Brignolia ondaatjei Ranasinghe & Benjamin, 2016 — Sri Lanka
- Brignolia palawan Platnick, Dupérré, Ott & Kranz-Baltensperger, 2011 — Philippines
- Brignolia parumpunctata (Simon, 1893) (type) — North, Central, South America. Introduced to Gambia, Sierra Leone, Seychelles, Yemen, Pakistan, India, Sri Lanka, Philippines, Indonesia (Sulawesi, Banda Is.), Australia (Queensland), Pacific Is.,
- Brignolia ratnapura Platnick, Dupérré, Ott & Kranz-Baltensperger, 2011 — Sri Lanka
- Brignolia rothorum Platnick, Dupérré, Ott & Kranz-Baltensperger, 2011 — India
- Brignolia schwendingeri Platnick, Dupérré, Ott & Kranz-Baltensperger, 2011 — Vietnam
- Brignolia shyami Ranasinghe & Benjamin, 2016 — Sri Lanka
- Brignolia sinharaja Platnick, Dupérré, Ott & Kranz-Baltensperger, 2011 — Sri Lanka
- Brignolia sukna Platnick, Dupérré, Ott & Kranz-Baltensperger, 2011 — Nepal
- Brignolia suthep Platnick, Dupérré, Ott & Kranz-Baltensperger, 2011 — Thailand
- Brignolia trichinalis (Benoit, 1979) — Mauritius, Seychelles, Sri Lanka
- Brignolia valparai Platnick, Dupérré, Ott & Kranz-Baltensperger, 2011 — India

== C ==
=== Caecoonops ===
Caecoonops Benoit, 1964

- Caecoonops apicotermitis Benoit, 1964 — Congo
- Caecoonops cubitermitis Benoit, 1964 (type) — Congo

=== Camptoscaphiella ===
Camptoscaphiella Caporiacco, 1934

- Camptoscaphiella fulva Caporiacco, 1934 (type) — Pakistan, India
- Camptoscaphiella glenniei (Fage, 1946) — India
- Camptoscaphiella gunsa Baehr, 2010 — India, Nepal
- Camptoscaphiella hilaris Brignoli, 1978 — Bhutan
- Camptoscaphiella loebli Baehr, 2010 — India
- Camptoscaphiella martensi Baehr, 2010 — Nepal
- Camptoscaphiella monteithi Baehr & Harvey, 2013 — New Caledonia
- Camptoscaphiella nepalensis Baehr, 2010 — Nepal
- Camptoscaphiella panchthar Baehr, 2010 — Nepal
- Camptoscaphiella paquini Ubick, 2010 — China
- Camptoscaphiella potteri Baehr & Harvey, 2013 — New Caledonia
- Camptoscaphiella schwendingeri Baehr, 2010 — Thailand
- Camptoscaphiella silens Brignoli, 1976 — Nepal
- Camptoscaphiella simoni Baehr, 2010 — Sri Lanka
- Camptoscaphiella sinensis Deeleman-Reinhold, 1995 — China
- Camptoscaphiella strepens Brignoli, 1976 — Nepal
- Camptoscaphiella taplejung Baehr, 2010 — Nepal
- Camptoscaphiella tuberans Tong & Li, 2007 — China

=== Cavisternum ===
Cavisternum Baehr, Harvey & Smith, 2010

- Cavisternum attenboroughi Baehr & Raven, 2013 — Australia (Northern Territory)
- Cavisternum bagleyae Baehr, Harvey & Smith, 2010 — Australia (Queensland)
- Cavisternum barthorum Baehr, Harvey & Smith, 2010 — Australia (Queensland)
- Cavisternum bertmaini Baehr, Harvey & Smith, 2010 — Australia (Western Australia)
- Cavisternum bom Ranasinghe & Benjamin, 2018 — Sri Lanka
- Cavisternum carae Baehr, Harvey & Smith, 2010 — Australia (Northern Territory)
- Cavisternum clavatum Baehr, Harvey & Smith, 2010 (type) — Australia (Western Australia)
- Cavisternum digweedi Baehr, Harvey & Smith, 2010 — Australia (Northern Territory)
- Cavisternum ewani Baehr, Harvey & Smith, 2010 — Australia (Queensland)
- Cavisternum federicae Baehr & Harvey, 2010 — Australia (Queensland)
- Cavisternum foxae Baehr, Harvey & Smith, 2010 — Australia (Queensland)
- Cavisternum gatangel Baehr, Harvey & Smith, 2010 — Australia (Queensland)
- Cavisternum gillespieae Harvey & Baehr, 2013 — Australia (Northern Territory)
- Cavisternum heywoodi Baehr, Harvey & Smith, 2010 — Australia (Queensland)
- Cavisternum hughesi Baehr, Harvey & Smith, 2010 — Australia (Queensland)
- Cavisternum ledereri Baehr, Harvey & Smith, 2010 — Australia (Queensland)
- Cavisternum leichhardti Harvey & Baehr, 2013 — Australia (Northern Territory)
- Cavisternum maxmoormanni Baehr, Harvey & Smith, 2010 — Australia (Northern Territory)
- Cavisternum mayorum Baehr, Harvey & Smith, 2010 — Australia (Queensland)
- Cavisternum michaelbellomoi Baehr, Harvey & Smith, 2010 — Australia (Queensland)
- Cavisternum monteithi Baehr & Harvey, 2010 — Australia (Queensland)
- Cavisternum noelashepherdae Baehr, Harvey & Smith, 2010 — Australia (Northern Territory)
- Cavisternum rochesterae Baehr, Harvey & Smith, 2010 — Australia (Queensland)
- Cavisternum toadshow Baehr, Harvey & Smith, 2010 — Australia (Queensland)
- Cavisternum waldockae Baehr, Harvey & Smith, 2010 — Australia (Western Australia)

=== Cortestina ===
Cortestina Knoflach, 2009

- Cortestina thaleri Knoflach, 2009 (type) — Austria, Italy

=== Costarina ===
Costarina Platnick & Dupérré, 2011

- Costarina abdita (Chickering, 1968) — Panama
- Costarina aguirre Platnick & Berniker, 2014 — Costa Rica
- Costarina almirante Platnick & Berniker, 2014 — Panama
- Costarina alturas Platnick & Berniker, 2014 — Costa Rica
- Costarina anchicaya Platnick & Berniker, 2014 — Colombia
- Costarina antonio Platnick & Berniker, 2014 — Colombia
- Costarina azul Platnick & Berniker, 2014 — Costa Rica
- Costarina barbilla Platnick & Berniker, 2014 — Costa Rica
- Costarina belmopan Platnick & Dupérré, 2012 — Belize, Guatemala
- Costarina blanco Platnick & Dupérré, 2012 — Nicaragua
- Costarina bocas Platnick & Berniker, 2014 — Panama
- Costarina bochil Platnick & Dupérré, 2012 — Mexico
- Costarina branstetteri Platnick & Dupérré, 2012 — Honduras
- Costarina cahui Platnick & Dupérré, 2012 — Guatemala
- Costarina carara Platnick & Berniker, 2014 — Costa Rica
- Costarina carrillo Platnick & Berniker, 2014 — Costa Rica
- Costarina ceiba Platnick & Dupérré, 2012 — Honduras
- Costarina cerere Platnick & Berniker, 2014 — Costa Rica
- Costarina cerrocol Platnick & Berniker, 2014 — Panama
- Costarina chiles Platnick & Berniker, 2014 — Costa Rica
- Costarina chiriqui Platnick & Berniker, 2014 — Panama
- Costarina choco Platnick & Berniker, 2014 — Colombia
- Costarina chonta Platnick & Berniker, 2014 — Costa Rica
- Costarina cima Platnick & Berniker, 2014 — Costa Rica
- Costarina clara Platnick & Berniker, 2014 — Panama
- Costarina cofradia Platnick & Dupérré, 2012 — Honduras
- Costarina coma Platnick & Dupérré, 2012 — Honduras
- Costarina concinna (Chickering, 1968) — Costa Rica, Panama
- Costarina cortes Platnick & Dupérré, 2012 — Honduras
- Costarina cruces Platnick & Berniker, 2014 — Costa Rica
- Costarina cruz Platnick & Berniker, 2014 — Costa Rica
- Costarina cuerici Platnick & Berniker, 2014 — Costa Rica
- Costarina cusuco Platnick & Dupérré, 2012 — Honduras
- Costarina diablo Platnick & Berniker, 2014 — Nicaragua
- Costarina dura (Chickering, 1951) — Panama
- Costarina dybasi Platnick & Berniker, 2014 — Panama
- Costarina elena Platnick & Berniker, 2014 — Costa Rica
- Costarina espavel Platnick & Berniker, 2014 — Costa Rica
- Costarina fortuna Platnick & Berniker, 2014 — Panama
- Costarina frantzius Platnick & Berniker, 2014 — Costa Rica
- Costarina gemelo Platnick & Berniker, 2014 — Costa Rica
- Costarina gorgona Platnick & Berniker, 2014 — Colombia
- Costarina gracias Platnick & Dupérré, 2012 — Honduras
- Costarina helechal Platnick & Berniker, 2014 — Colombia
- Costarina hitoy Platnick & Berniker, 2014 — Costa Rica
- Costarina intempina (Chickering, 1968) — Panama
- Costarina isidro Platnick & Berniker, 2014 — Costa Rica
- Costarina iviei Platnick & Dupérré, 2012 — Mexico
- Costarina izabal Platnick & Dupérré, 2012 — Guatemala
- Costarina jimenez Platnick & Berniker, 2014 — Costa Rica
- Costarina junio Platnick & Berniker, 2014 — Costa Rica
- Costarina kilambe Platnick & Berniker, 2014 — Nicaragua
- Costarina leones Platnick & Berniker, 2014 — Costa Rica
- Costarina llama Platnick & Dupérré, 2012 — Mexico
- Costarina macha Platnick & Dupérré, 2012 — Guatemala
- Costarina macho Platnick & Berniker, 2014 — Costa Rica
- Costarina maritza Platnick & Berniker, 2014 — Costa Rica
- Costarina meridina (Chickering, 1968) — Costa Rica
- Costarina mixtepec Platnick & Dupérré, 2012 — Mexico
- Costarina monte Platnick & Berniker, 2014 — Costa Rica
- Costarina mooreorum Platnick & Berniker, 2014 — Costa Rica
- Costarina morales Platnick & Dupérré, 2012 — Guatemala
- Costarina muralla Platnick & Dupérré, 2012 — Honduras
- Costarina murphyorum Platnick & Berniker, 2014 — Costa Rica
- Costarina musun Platnick & Dupérré, 2012 — Nicaragua
- Costarina naja Platnick & Dupérré, 2012 — Mexico
- Costarina nara Platnick & Berniker, 2014 — Costa Rica
- Costarina oaxaca Platnick & Dupérré, 2012 — Mexico
- Costarina obtina (Chickering, 1968) — Costa Rica, Panama
- Costarina olancho Platnick & Dupérré, 2012 — Honduras
- Costarina osa Platnick & Berniker, 2014 — Costa Rica
- Costarina otun Platnick & Berniker, 2014 — Colombia
- Costarina palmar Platnick & Berniker, 2014 — Costa Rica
- Costarina parabio Platnick & Berniker, 2014 — Costa Rica
- Costarina parapalmar Platnick & Berniker, 2014 — Costa Rica
- Costarina paraplena Platnick & Berniker, 2014 — Costa Rica
- Costarina penshurst Platnick & Berniker, 2014 — Costa Rica
- Costarina peten Platnick & Dupérré, 2012 — Guatemala
- Costarina pittier Platnick & Berniker, 2014 — Costa Rica, Panama
- Costarina pity Platnick & Berniker, 2014 — Costa Rica
- Costarina plena (O. Pickard-Cambridge, 1894) (type) — Mexico to Costa Rica
- Costarina poas Platnick & Berniker, 2014 — Costa Rica
- Costarina quepos Platnick & Berniker, 2014 — Costa Rica
- Costarina rafael Platnick & Berniker, 2014 — Costa Rica
- Costarina ramon Platnick & Berniker, 2014 — Costa Rica
- Costarina recondita (Chickering, 1951) — Panama
- Costarina reventazon Platnick & Berniker, 2014 — Costa Rica
- Costarina saladito Platnick & Berniker, 2014 — Colombia
- Costarina san Platnick & Berniker, 2014 — Costa Rica
- Costarina sasaima Platnick & Berniker, 2014 — Colombia
- Costarina seclusa (Chickering, 1951) — Panama
- Costarina selva Platnick & Berniker, 2014 — Costa Rica
- Costarina semibio Platnick & Berniker, 2014 — Costa Rica
- Costarina sepultura Platnick & Dupérré, 2012 — Mexico
- Costarina sorkini Platnick & Berniker, 2014 — Panama
- Costarina subplena Platnick & Dupérré, 2012 — Mexico, Guatemala
- Costarina suiza Platnick & Berniker, 2014 — Colombia
- Costarina superplena Platnick & Berniker, 2014 — Costa Rica
- Costarina taraira Platnick & Berniker, 2014 — Colombia
- Costarina tela Platnick & Dupérré, 2012 — Honduras
- Costarina tskui Platnick & Berniker, 2014 — Panama
- Costarina ubicki Platnick & Berniker, 2014 — Costa Rica
- Costarina upala Platnick & Berniker, 2014 — Costa Rica
- Costarina veragua Platnick & Berniker, 2014 — Costa Rica
- Costarina viejo Platnick & Berniker, 2014 — Costa Rica
- Costarina waspuk Platnick & Dupérré, 2012 — Nicaragua
- Costarina watina (Chickering, 1968) — Costa Rica
- Costarina yotoco Platnick & Berniker, 2014 — Colombia

=== Cousinea ===
Cousinea Saaristo, 2001

- Cousinea keeleyi Saaristo, 2001 (type) — Seychelles

=== Coxapopha ===
Coxapopha Platnick, 2000

- Coxapopha bare Ott & Brescovit, 2004 — Brazil
- Coxapopha caeca (Birabén, 1954) — Argentina
- Coxapopha carinata Ott & Brescovit, 2004 — Brazil
- Coxapopha diblemma Platnick, 2000 (type) — Panama
- Coxapopha yuyapichis Ott & Brescovit, 2004 — Peru

== D ==
=== Dalmasula ===
Dalmasula Platnick, Szüts & Ubick, 2012

- Dalmasula dodebai Szűts & Ubick, 2012 — South Africa
- Dalmasula griswoldi Szűts & Ubick, 2012 — South Africa
- Dalmasula lorelei Platnick & Dupérré, 2012 (type) — Namibia
- Dalmasula parvimana (Simon, 1910) — Namibia
- Dalmasula tsumkwe Platnick & Dupérré, 2012 — Namibia

=== Diblemma ===
Diblemma O. Pickard-Cambridge, 1908

- Diblemma donisthorpei O. Pickard-Cambridge, 1909 (type) — Seychelles

=== Dysderina ===
Dysderina Simon, 1892

- Dysderina amaca Platnick, Berniker & Bonaldo, 2013 — Colombia
- Dysderina ayo Platnick, Berniker & Bonaldo, 2013 — Colombia
- Dysderina baehrae Platnick, Berniker & Bonaldo, 2013 — Ecuador
- Dysderina bimucronata Simon, 1893 — Philippines
- Dysderina capensis Simon, 1907 — South Africa
- Dysderina craigi Platnick, Berniker & Bonaldo, 2013 — Colombia
- Dysderina cunday Platnick, Berniker & Bonaldo, 2013 — Colombia
- Dysderina erwini Platnick, Berniker & Bonaldo, 2013 — Ecuador
- Dysderina excavata Platnick, Berniker & Bonaldo, 2013 — Ecuador
- Dysderina granulosa Simon & Fage, 1922 — East Africa
- Dysderina insularum Roewer, 1963 — Caroline Is.
- Dysderina machinator (Keyserling, 1881) — Peru
- Dysderina matamata Platnick, Berniker & Bonaldo, 2013 — Colombia
- Dysderina perarmata Fage & Simon, 1936 — Kenya
- Dysderina principalis (Keyserling, 1881) (type) — Colombia
- Dysderina purpurea Simon, 1893 — Philippines
- Dysderina sacha Platnick, Berniker & Bonaldo, 2013 — Ecuador
- Dysderina sasaima Platnick, Berniker & Bonaldo, 2013 — Colombia
- Dysderina scutata (O. Pickard-Cambridge, 1876) — Egypt
- Dysderina speculifera Simon, 1907 — South Africa, Mozambique
- Dysderina straba Fage, 1936 — Kenya
- Dysderina sublaevis Simon, 1907 — Algeria
- Dysderina tiputini Platnick, Berniker & Bonaldo, 2013 — Ecuador
- Dysderina urucu Platnick, Berniker & Bonaldo, 2013 — Brazil

=== Dysderoides ===
Dysderoides Fage, 1946

- Dysderoides kaew Grismado & Deeleman, 2014 — Thailand
- Dysderoides kanoi Grismado & Deeleman, 2014 — Thailand
- Dysderoides lawa Grismado & Deeleman, 2014 — Thailand
- Dysderoides muang Grismado & Deeleman, 2014 — Thailand
- Dysderoides synrang Grismado & Deeleman, 2014 — India
- Dysderoides typhlos Fage, 1946 (type) — India

== E ==
=== Emboonops ===
Emboonops Bolzern, Platnick & Berniker, 2015

- Emboonops arriaga Bolzern, Platnick & Berniker, 2015 — Mexico
- Emboonops bonampak Bolzern, Platnick & Berniker, 2015 — Mexico
- Emboonops calco Bolzern, Platnick & Berniker, 2015 — Mexico
- Emboonops catrin Bolzern, Platnick & Berniker, 2015 — Mexico
- Emboonops hermosa Bolzern, Platnick & Berniker, 2015 — Mexico
- Emboonops mckenziei (Gertsch, 1977) — Mexico
- Emboonops nejapa Bolzern, Platnick & Berniker, 2015 (type) — Mexico
- Emboonops palenque Bolzern, Platnick & Berniker, 2015 — Mexico
- Emboonops tamaz Bolzern, Platnick & Berniker, 2015 — Mexico
- Emboonops tuxtlas Bolzern, Platnick & Berniker, 2015 — Mexico

=== Escaphiella ===
Escaphiella Platnick & Dupérré, 2009

- Escaphiella acapulco Platnick & Dupérré, 2009 — Mexico
- Escaphiella aratau Platnick & Dupérré, 2009 — Brazil
- Escaphiella argentina (Birabén, 1954) — Argentina
- Escaphiella bahia Platnick & Dupérré, 2009 — Brazil
- Escaphiella betin Platnick & Dupérré, 2009 — Colombia
- Escaphiella blumenau Platnick & Dupérré, 2009 — Brazil
- Escaphiella bolivar Platnick & Dupérré, 2009 — Venezuela
- Escaphiella cachimbo Platnick & Dupérré, 2009 — Brazil
- Escaphiella catemaco Platnick & Dupérré, 2009 — Mexico
- Escaphiella chiapa Platnick & Dupérré, 2009 — Mexico
- Escaphiella cidades Platnick & Dupérré, 2009 — Brazil
- Escaphiella colima Platnick & Dupérré, 2009 — Mexico
- Escaphiella cristobal Platnick & Dupérré, 2009 — Ecuador (Galapagos Is.)
- Escaphiella exlineae Platnick & Dupérré, 2009 — Peru
- Escaphiella gertschi (Chickering, 1951) — Panama, Colombia, Venezuela, Jamaica, Galapagos Is.
- Escaphiella gigantea Platnick & Dupérré, 2009 — Colombia
- Escaphiella hespera (Chamberlin, 1924) (type) — USA, Mexico
- Escaphiella hesperoides Platnick & Dupérré, 2009 — Brazil
- Escaphiella iguala (Gertsch & Davis, 1942) — Mexico
- Escaphiella isabela Platnick & Dupérré, 2009 — Ecuador (Galapagos Is.)
- Escaphiella itys (Simon, 1893) — Cayman Is., Jamaica, Curaçao, Venezuela
- Escaphiella litoris (Chamberlin, 1924) — USA, Mexico
- Escaphiella maculosa Platnick & Dupérré, 2009 — Brazil
- Escaphiella magna Platnick & Dupérré, 2009 — Mexico
- Escaphiella morro Platnick & Dupérré, 2009 — Brazil
- Escaphiella nayarit Platnick & Dupérré, 2009 — Mexico
- Escaphiella nye Platnick & Dupérré, 2009 — USA
- Escaphiella ocoa Platnick & Dupérré, 2009 — Chile
- Escaphiella olivacea Platnick & Dupérré, 2009 — Mexico
- Escaphiella peckorum Platnick & Dupérré, 2009 — Argentina
- Escaphiella pocone Platnick & Dupérré, 2009 — Brazil, Argentina
- Escaphiella ramirezi Platnick & Dupérré, 2009 — Argentina, Uruguay
- Escaphiella schmidti (Reimoser, 1939) — Nicaragua, Costa Rica
- Escaphiella tayrona Platnick & Dupérré, 2009 — Colombia
- Escaphiella tonila Platnick & Dupérré, 2009 — Mexico
- Escaphiella viquezi Platnick & Dupérré, 2009 — Honduras, Nicaragua

== F ==
=== Farqua ===
Farqua Saaristo, 2001

- Farqua quadrimaculata Saaristo, 2001 (type) — Seychelles (Farquhar Is.)

== G ==
=== Gamasomorpha ===
Gamasomorpha Karsch, 1881

- Gamasomorpha anhuiensis Song & Xu, 1984 — China
- Gamasomorpha arabica Simon, 1893 — Middle East
- Gamasomorpha asterobothros Eichenberger, 2012 — Indonesia (Sumatra)
- Gamasomorpha austera Simon, 1898 — Seychelles
- Gamasomorpha australis Hewitt, 1915 — South Africa
- Gamasomorpha barbifera Tong & Li, 2007 — China
- Gamasomorpha bipeltis (Thorell, 1895) — Myanmar
- Gamasomorpha brasiliana Bristowe, 1938 — Brazil
- Gamasomorpha camelina Simon, 1893 — Singapore
- Gamasomorpha cataphracta Karsch, 1881 (type) — Korea, Taiwan, Japan, Philippines
- Gamasomorpha clarki Hickman, 1950 — Australia
- Gamasomorpha clypeolaria Simon, 1907 — India
- Gamasomorpha comosa Tong & Li, 2009 — China, Laos
- Gamasomorpha coniacris Eichenberger, 2012 — Malaysia, Indonesia (Bintan Is.)
- Gamasomorpha deksam Saaristo & van Harten, 2002 — Yemen (Socotra)
- Gamasomorpha fricki Eichenberger, 2012 — Vietnam
- Gamasomorpha gershomi Saaristo, 2007 — Israel
- Gamasomorpha humicola Lawrence, 1947 — South Africa
- Gamasomorpha humilis Mello-Leitão, 1920 — Brazil
- Gamasomorpha inclusa (Thorell, 1887) — Myanmar
- Gamasomorpha insomnia Eichenberger, 2012 — Thailand, Malaysia, Indonesia (Borneo, Sulawesi), New Guinea
- Gamasomorpha insularis Simon, 1907 — Madeira, Equatorial Guinea (Bioko), São Tomé and Príncipe, St. Helena, Mauritius, Yemen, Seychelles
- Gamasomorpha jeanneli Fage, 1936 — Kenya
- Gamasomorpha kabulensis Roewer, 1960 — Afghanistan
- Gamasomorpha keri Eichenberger, 2012 — Indonesia (Sumatra)
- Gamasomorpha kraepelini Simon, 1905 — Indonesia (Java)
- Gamasomorpha kusumii Komatsu, 1963 — Japan
- Gamasomorpha lalana Suman, 1965 — Hawaii, Japan
- Gamasomorpha linzhiensis Hu, 2001 — China
- Gamasomorpha longisetosa Lawrence, 1952 — South Africa
- Gamasomorpha lutzi (Petrunkevitch, 1929) — USA to Panama, Caribbean
- Gamasomorpha m-scripta Birabén, 1954 — Argentina
- Gamasomorpha microps Simon, 1907 — Sri Lanka
- Gamasomorpha mornensis Benoit, 1979 — Seychelles
- Gamasomorpha nigrilineata Xu, 1986 — China
- Gamasomorpha nitida Simon, 1893 — Philippines
- Gamasomorpha ophiria Eichenberger, 2012 — Malaysia
- Gamasomorpha parmata (Thorell, 1890) — Indonesia (Sumatra, Java, Lombok)
- Gamasomorpha patquiana Birabén, 1954 — Argentina
- Gamasomorpha petoteca Eichenberger, 2012 — Indonesia (Sumatra)
- Gamasomorpha plana (Keyserling, 1883) — Peru
- Gamasomorpha platensis Birabén, 1954 — Argentina
- Gamasomorpha porcina Simon, 1909 — Vietnam
- Gamasomorpha psyllodes Thorell, 1897 — Myanmar
- Gamasomorpha puberula (Simon, 1893) — Venezuela
- Gamasomorpha pusilla Berland, 1914 — East Africa
- Gamasomorpha raya Eichenberger, 2012 — Malaysia, Indonesia (Bintan Is.)
- Gamasomorpha rufa Banks, 1898 — Mexico
- Gamasomorpha schmilingi Eichenberger, 2012 — Malaysia, Indonesia (Bali)
- Gamasomorpha sculptilis Thorell, 1897 — Myanmar
- Gamasomorpha semitecta Simon, 1907 — Indonesia (Sumatra)
- Gamasomorpha servula Simon, 1908 — Australia (Western Australia)
- Gamasomorpha seximpressa Simon, 1907 — Indonesia (Java)
- Gamasomorpha silvestris (Simon, 1893) — Venezuela
- Gamasomorpha simplex (Simon, 1892) — St. Vincent
- Gamasomorpha squalens Eichenberger, 2012 — Malaysia
- Gamasomorpha subclathrata Simon, 1907 — Sri Lanka
- Gamasomorpha taprobanica Simon, 1893 — Sri Lanka
- Gamasomorpha testudinella Berland, 1914 — East Africa
- Gamasomorpha tovarensis (Simon, 1893) — Venezuela
- Gamasomorpha vianai Birabén, 1954 — Argentina
- Gamasomorpha virgulata Tong & Li, 2009 — China
- Gamasomorpha wasmanniae Mello-Leitão, 1939 — Argentina

=== Gradunguloonops ===
Gradunguloonops Grismado, Izquierdo, González M. & Ramírez, 2015

- Gradunguloonops amazonicus Grismado, Izquierdo, González M. & Ramírez, 2015 — Brazil
- Gradunguloonops benavidesae Grismado, Izquierdo, González M. & Ramírez, 2015 — Colombia
- Gradunguloonops bonaldoi Grismado, Izquierdo, González M. & Ramírez, 2015 — Brazil
- Gradunguloonops erwini Grismado, Izquierdo, González M. & Ramírez, 2015 — Peru
- Gradunguloonops florezi Grismado, Izquierdo, González M. & Ramírez, 2015 — Colombia
- Gradunguloonops juruti Grismado, Izquierdo, González M. & Ramírez, 2015 — Brazil
- Gradunguloonops mutum Grismado, Izquierdo, González M. & Ramírez, 2015 (type) — Peru, Brazil
- Gradunguloonops nadineae Grismado, Izquierdo, González M. & Ramírez, 2015 — Ecuador
- Gradunguloonops orellana Grismado, Izquierdo, González M. & Ramírez, 2015 — Ecuador
- Gradunguloonops pacanari Grismado, Izquierdo, González M. & Ramírez, 2015 — Brazil
- Gradunguloonops raptor Grismado, Izquierdo, González M. & Ramírez, 2015 — Venezuela
- Gradunguloonops urucu Grismado, Izquierdo, González M. & Ramírez, 2015 — Brazil

=== Grymeus ===
Grymeus Harvey, 1987

- Grymeus barbatus Harvey, 1987 — Australia (South Australia)
- Grymeus dharmapriyai Ranasinghe & Benjamin, 2018 — Sri Lanka
- Grymeus robertsi Harvey, 1987 (type) — Australia (Victoria)
- Grymeus yanga Harvey, 1987 — Australia (Victoria, New South Wales)

=== Guaraguaoonops ===
Guaraguaoonops Brescovit, Rheims & Bonaldo, 2012

- Guaraguaoonops hemhem Brescovit, Rheims & Bonaldo, 2012 (type) — Brazil
- Guaraguaoonops humbom Brescovit, Rheims & Bonaldo, 2012 — Brazil

=== Guatemoonops ===
Guatemoonops Bolzern, Platnick & Berniker, 2015

- Guatemoonops augustin Bolzern, Platnick & Berniker, 2015 — Guatemala
- Guatemoonops chilasco Bolzern, Platnick & Berniker, 2015 — Guatemala
- Guatemoonops jaba Bolzern, Platnick & Berniker, 2015 — Guatemala
- Guatemoonops purulha Bolzern, Platnick & Berniker, 2015 (type) — Guatemala
- Guatemoonops rhino Bolzern, Platnick & Berniker, 2015 — Mexico
- Guatemoonops zacapa Bolzern, Platnick & Berniker, 2015 — Guatemala

== H ==
=== Heteroonops ===
Heteroonops Dalmas, 1916

- Heteroonops andros Platnick & Dupérré, 2009 — Bahama Is.
- Heteroonops castelloides Platnick & Dupérré, 2009 — Hispaniola
- Heteroonops castellus (Chickering, 1971) — Puerto Rico, Virgin Is.
- Heteroonops colombi Dumitrescu & Georgescu, 1983 — Cuba
- Heteroonops croix Platnick & Dupérré, 2009 — Virgin Is.
- Heteroonops iviei Platnick & Dupérré, 2009 — Hispaniola
- Heteroonops macaque Platnick & Dupérré, 2009 — Dominican Rep.
- Heteroonops murphyorum Platnick & Dupérré, 2009 — Costa Rica
- Heteroonops saba Platnick & Dupérré, 2009 — Saba, Montserrat
- Heteroonops singulus (Gertsch & Davis, 1942) — Mexico
- Heteroonops spinigata Platnick & Dupérré, 2009 — Jamaica
- Heteroonops spinimanus (Simon, 1892) (type) — North to South America, Caribbean. Introduced to Macaronesia, Germany, Seychelles, Madagascar, Australia, Pacific Is.
- Heteroonops toro Platnick & Dupérré, 2009 — Puerto Rico
- Heteroonops validus (Bryant, 1948) — Hispaniola
- Heteroonops vega Platnick & Dupérré, 2009 — Hispaniola

=== Hexapopha ===
Hexapopha Platnick, Berniker & Víquez, 2014

- Hexapopha hone Platnick, Berniker & Víquez, 2014 — Costa Rica
- Hexapopha jimenez Platnick, Berniker & Víquez, 2014 — Costa Rica
- Hexapopha osa Platnick, Berniker & Víquez, 2014 — Costa Rica
- Hexapopha reimoseri (Fage, 1938) (type) — Costa Rica

=== Himalayana ===
Himalayana Grismado, 2014

- Himalayana andreae Grismado, 2014 — India
- Himalayana castanopsis Grismado, 2014 — Nepal
- Himalayana kathmandu Grismado, 2014 (type) — Nepal
- Himalayana martensi Grismado, 2014 — Nepal
- Himalayana parbat Grismado, 2014 — Nepal
- Himalayana siliwalae Grismado, 2014 — India

=== Hortoonops ===
Hortoonops Platnick & Dupérré, 2012

- Hortoonops excavatus Platnick & Dupérré, 2012 — Hispaniola
- Hortoonops lucradus (Chickering, 1969) (type) — Virgin Is.
- Hortoonops portoricensis (Petrunkevitch, 1929) — Puerto Rico

=== Hypnoonops ===
Hypnoonops Benoit, 1977

- Hypnoonops lejeunei Benoit, 1977 (type) — Congo

=== Hytanis ===
Hytanis Simon, 1893

- Hytanis oblonga Simon, 1893 (type) — Venezuela

== I ==
=== Ischnothyreus ===
Ischnothyreus

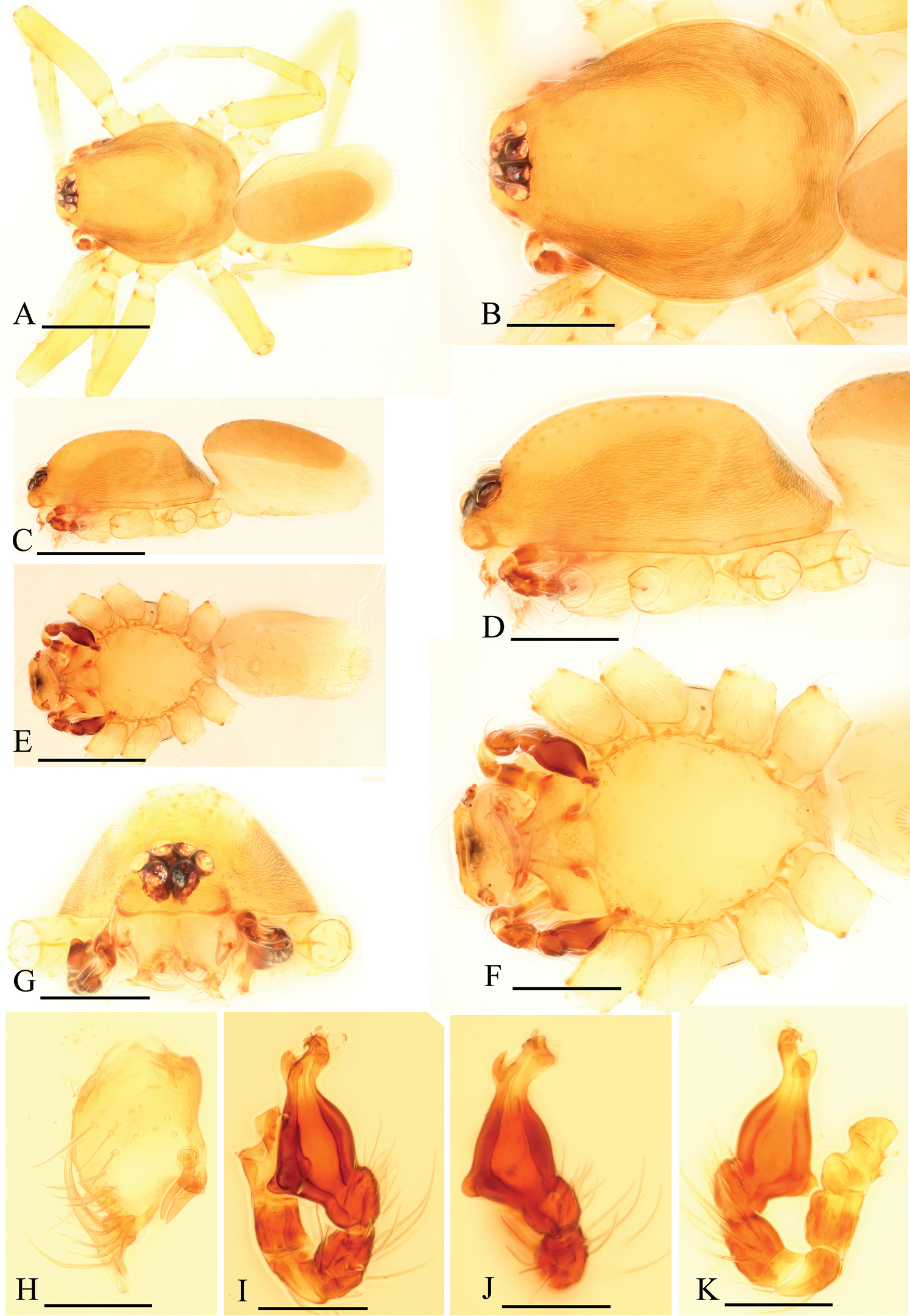
Ischnothyreus kentingensis, male

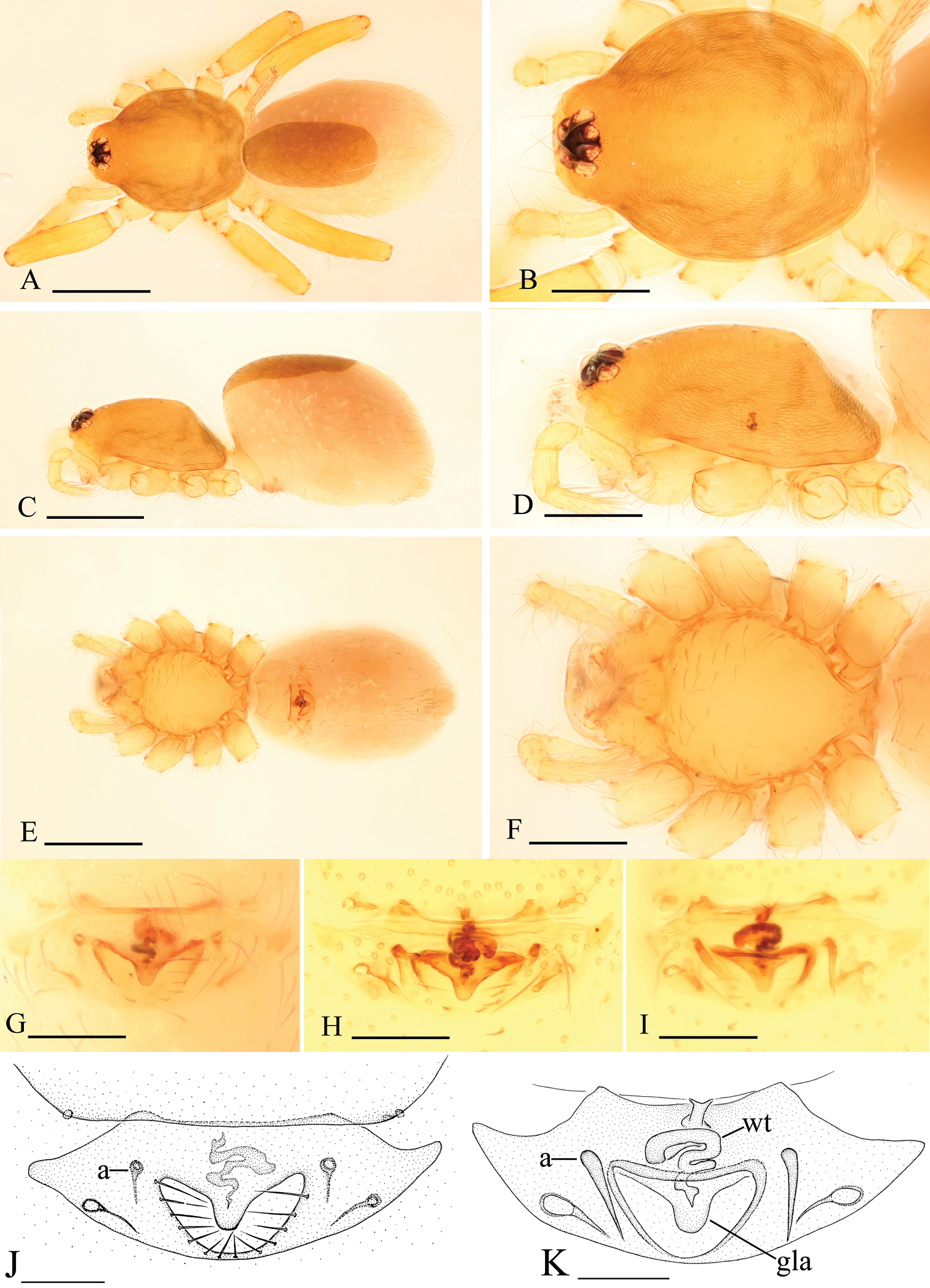
Ischnothyreus kentingensis, female

Ischnothyreus Simon, 1893

- Ischnothyreus aculeatus (Simon, 1893) — Philippines
- Ischnothyreus an Tong & Li, 2016 — Singapore
- Ischnothyreus arcus Edward & Harvey, 2014 — Australia (Queensland)
- Ischnothyreus ascifer Richard, 2016 — Indonesia (Sumatra)
- Ischnothyreus auritus Tong & Li, 2012 — China
- Ischnothyreus baltenspergerae Richard, 2016 — Indonesia (Java)
- Ischnothyreus balu Kranz-Baltensperger, 2011 — Borneo
- Ischnothyreus barratus Edward & Harvey, 2014 — Australia (Queensland)
- Ischnothyreus barus Kranz-Baltensperger, 2011 — Borneo
- Ischnothyreus bauri Richard, 2016 — Indonesia (Java)
- Ischnothyreus bifidus Edward & Harvey, 2014 — Australia (Queensland)
- Ischnothyreus binorbis Edward & Harvey, 2014 — Australia (Queensland)
- Ischnothyreus bipartitus Simon, 1893 — Sri Lanka
- Ischnothyreus boonjee Edward & Harvey, 2014 — Australia (Queensland)
- Ischnothyreus browni Chickering, 1968 — Philippines
- Ischnothyreus brunneus Tong & Li, 2016 — Singapore
- Ischnothyreus bualveus Edward & Harvey, 2014 — Australia (Queensland)
- Ischnothyreus bupariorbis Edward & Harvey, 2014 — Australia (Queensland)
- Ischnothyreus campanaceus Tong & Li, 2008 — China
- Ischnothyreus caoqii Tong, Bian & Li, 2023 — China
- Ischnothyreus chippy Ranasinghe & Benjamin, 2018 — Sri Lanka
- Ischnothyreus collingwoodi Edward & Harvey, 2014 — Australia (Queensland)
- Ischnothyreus comicus Edward & Harvey, 2014 — Australia (Queensland)
- Ischnothyreus concavus Richard, 2016 — Indonesia (Sumatra)
- Ischnothyreus corniculatum Edward & Harvey, 2014 — Australia (Queensland)
- Ischnothyreus cornuatus Edward & Harvey, 2014 — Australia (Queensland)
- Ischnothyreus corollacous Tong & Li, 2013 — Laos
- Ischnothyreus crenulatus Edward & Harvey, 2014 — Australia (Queensland)
- Ischnothyreus cristiformis Tong & Li, 2023 — China
- Ischnothyreus culleni Edward & Harvey, 2014 — Australia (Queensland)
- Ischnothyreus dactylinus Tong & Li, 2016 — Singapore
- Ischnothyreus danum Kranz-Baltensperger, 2011 — Borneo
- Ischnothyreus darwini Edward & Harvey, 2009 — Australia (Northern Territory)
- Ischnothyreus deccanensis Tikader & Malhotra, 1974 — India
- Ischnothyreus deelemanae Kranz-Baltensperger, 2011 — Borneo
- Ischnothyreus digitus Edward & Harvey, 2014 — Australia (Queensland)
- Ischnothyreus eacham Edward & Harvey, 2014 — Australia (Queensland)
- Ischnothyreus elvis Kranz-Baltensperger, 2011 — Borneo
- Ischnothyreus eungella Edward & Harvey, 2014 — Australia (Queensland)
- Ischnothyreus falcatus Tong & Li, 2008 — China
- Ischnothyreus falcifer Kranz-Baltensperger, 2011 — Borneo
- Ischnothyreus flabellifer Kranz-Baltensperger, 2011 — Borneo
- Ischnothyreus flagellichelis Xu, 1989 — China
- Ischnothyreus flippi Kranz-Baltensperger, 2011 — Borneo
- Ischnothyreus florence Edward & Harvey, 2014 — Australia (Northern Territory)
- Ischnothyreus florifer Kranz-Baltensperger, 2011 — Borneo
- Ischnothyreus fobor Kranz-Baltensperger, 2011 — Borneo
- Ischnothyreus gigeri Richard, 2016 — Indonesia (Java)
- Ischnothyreus habeggeri Richard, 2016 — Indonesia (Sumatra)
- Ischnothyreus hamatus Edward & Harvey, 2014 — Australia (Queensland)
- Ischnothyreus hanae Tong & Li, 2008 — China
- Ischnothyreus haymozi Richard, 2016 — Indonesia (Sumatra)
- Ischnothyreus hooki Kranz-Baltensperger, 2011 — Borneo
- Ischnothyreus hoplophorus Edward & Harvey, 2014 — Australia (Queensland)
- Ischnothyreus hponkanrazi Tong & Li, 2020 — Myanmar
- Ischnothyreus jianglangi Tong & Li, 2020 — Myanmar
- Ischnothyreus jivani Benoit, 1979 — Seychelles
- Ischnothyreus jojo Kranz-Baltensperger, 2011 — Borneo
- Ischnothyreus julianneae Edward & Harvey, 2014 — Australia (Queensland)
- Ischnothyreus kalimantan Kranz-Baltensperger, 2011 — Borneo
- Ischnothyreus kentingensis Tong & Li, 2014 — Taiwan
- Ischnothyreus ker Edward & Harvey, 2014 — Australia (Queensland)
- Ischnothyreus khamis Saaristo & van Harten, 2006 — Yemen
- Ischnothyreus lanutoo Marples, 1955 — Samoa
- Ischnothyreus ligulatus Richard, 2016 — Indonesia (Java)
- Ischnothyreus linzhiensis Hu, 2001 — China
- Ischnothyreus lucidus Richard, 2016 — Indonesia (Sumatra)
- Ischnothyreus lymphaseus Simon, 1893 — Sri Lanka
- Ischnothyreus mangun Tong & Li, 2021 — China
- Ischnothyreus marggii Richard, 2016 — Indonesia (Sumatra)
- Ischnothyreus matang Kranz-Baltensperger, 2011 — Borneo
- Ischnothyreus meidamon Edward & Harvey, 2014 — Australia (Queensland)
- Ischnothyreus mengyang Tong & Li, 2021 — China
- Ischnothyreus metok Tong, Bian & Li, 2023 — China
- Ischnothyreus meukyawwa Tong & Li, 2020 — Myanmar
- Ischnothyreus microphthalmus Richard, 2016 — Indonesia (Sumatra)
- Ischnothyreus monteithi Edward & Harvey, 2014 — Australia (Queensland)
- Ischnothyreus mulumi Kranz-Baltensperger, 2011 — Borneo
- Ischnothyreus namo Kranz-Baltensperger, 2012 — Malaysia
- Ischnothyreus narutomii (Nakatsudi, 1942) — China, Taiwan, Japan
- Ischnothyreus nentwigorum Richard, 2016 — Indonesia (Java)
- Ischnothyreus nourlangie Edward & Harvey, 2014 — Australia (Northern Territory)
- Ischnothyreus obscurus Richard, 2016 — Indonesia (Sumatra)
- Ischnothyreus ogatai Suzuki, Hidaka & Tatsuta, 2023 — Ryukyu Islands
- Ischnothyreus ovinus Edward & Harvey, 2014 — Australia (Queensland)
- Ischnothyreus pacificus Roewer, 1963 — Micronesia
- Ischnothyreus peltifer (Simon, 1892) (type) — Tropical Asia. Introduced to North, Central, South America, Britain, Gaboon, Seychelles, Madagascar, Hawaii
- Ischnothyreus piricius Edward & Harvey, 2014 — Australia (Queensland)
- Ischnothyreus poculum Tong & Li, 2016 — Singapore
- Ischnothyreus pome Tong, Bian & Li, 2023 — China
- Ischnothyreus pterodactyl Edward & Harvey, 2014 — Australia (Queensland, New South Wales)
- Ischnothyreus puruntatamerii Edward & Harvey, 2014 — Australia (Northern Territory)
- Ischnothyreus putao Tong & Li, 2020 — Myanmar
- Ischnothyreus qianlongae Tong & Li, 2008 — China
- Ischnothyreus qidaoban Tong & Li, 2021 — China
- Ischnothyreus qiuxing Tong & Li, 2020 — Myanmar, China
- Ischnothyreus raveni Edward & Harvey, 2014 — Australia (Queensland)
- Ischnothyreus rex Kranz-Baltensperger, 2011 — Borneo
- Ischnothyreus rixi Edward & Harvey, 2014 — Australia (Queensland)
- Ischnothyreus ruyuanensis Tong, 2023 — China
- Ischnothyreus serapi Kranz-Baltensperger, 2011 — Borneo
- Ischnothyreus serpentinum Saaristo, 2001 — Seychelles, Madagascar, Indonesia (Java)
- Ischnothyreus shillongensis Tikader, 1968 — India, Bhutan
- Ischnothyreus sigridae Richard, 2016 — Indonesia (Java)
- Ischnothyreus sijiae Tong & Li, 2021 — China
- Ischnothyreus spineus Tong & Li, 2012 — China
- Ischnothyreus stauntoni Edward & Harvey, 2014 — Australia (Queensland)
- Ischnothyreus subaculeatus Roewer, 1938 — Indonesia (Moluccas)
- Ischnothyreus tadetu Tong & Li, 2013 — Laos
- Ischnothyreus tadfane Tong & Li, 2013 — Laos
- Ischnothyreus tuanggyi Tong & Li, 2020 — Myanmar
- Ischnothyreus tectorius Tong & Li, 2016 — Singapore
- Ischnothyreus tekek Kranz-Baltensperger, 2012 — Malaysia
- Ischnothyreus tergeminus Liu, Xu & Henrard, 2019 — China
- Ischnothyreus tioman Kranz-Baltensperger, 2012 — Malaysia
- Ischnothyreus tragicus Edward & Harvey, 2014 — Australia (Queensland)
- Ischnothyreus tumidus Edward & Harvey, 2014 — Australia (Queensland)
- Ischnothyreus ujungkulon Richard, 2016 — Indonesia (Java)
- Ischnothyreus velox Jackson, 1908 — Tropical Asia. Introduced to North and Central America, Britain, Netherlands, Germany, Seychelles, Madagascar, Hawaii
- Ischnothyreus xiaolongha Tong & Li, 2021 — China
- Ischnothyreus xui Tong & Li, 2012 — China
- Ischnothyreus yuanyeae Tong & Li, 2012 — China
- Ischnothyreus yueluensis Yin & Wang, 1984 — China
- Ischnothyreus yunlong Tong & Li, 2021 — China
- Ischnothyreus zhigangi Tong & Li, 2020 — Myanmar
- Ischnothyreus zhoujiayan Tong & Li, 2018 — China

== K ==
=== Kachinia ===
Kachinia Tong & Li, 2018

- Kachinia mahmolae Tong & Li, 2018 — Myanmar
- Kachinia putao Tong & Li, 2018 (type) — Myanmar

=== Kapitia ===
Kapitia Forster, 1956

- Kapitia obscura Forster, 1956 (type) — New Zealand

=== Khamiscar ===
Khamiscar Platnick & Berniker, 2015

- Khamiscar ambi Platnick & Berniker, 2015 — Madagascar
- Khamiscar anta Platnick & Berniker, 2015 (type) — Madagascar
- Khamiscar baly Platnick & Berniker, 2015 — Madagascar
- Khamiscar kiri Platnick & Berniker, 2015 — Madagascar
- Khamiscar maro Platnick & Berniker, 2015 — Madagascar
- Khamiscar tola Platnick & Berniker, 2015 — Madagascar

=== Khamisia ===
Khamisia Saaristo & van Harten, 2006

- Khamisia atlit Platnick & Berniker, 2015 — Israel
- Khamisia banisad Saaristo & van Harten, 2006 (type) — Yemen
- Khamisia hayer Platnick & Berniker, 2015 — United Arab Emirates. Introduced to Cape Verde Is.
- Khamisia holmi Platnick & Berniker, 2015 — Kenya

=== Khamisina ===
Khamisina Platnick & Berniker, 2015

- Khamisina ibadan Platnick & Berniker, 2015 — Nigeria
- Khamisina kilifi Platnick & Berniker, 2015 — Kenya
- Khamisina kivu Platnick & Berniker, 2015 (type) — Congo

=== Khamisoides ===
Khamisoides Platnick & Berniker, 2015

- Khamisoides calabash Platnick & Berniker, 2015 — Virgin Is.
- Khamisoides edwardsi Platnick & Berniker, 2015 (type) — Virgin Is.
- Khamisoides muchmorei Platnick & Berniker, 2015 — Virgin Is.

=== Kijabe ===
Kijabe Berland, 1914

- Kijabe ensifera Caporiacco, 1949 — Kenya
- Kijabe paradoxa Berland, 1914 (type) — East Africa

== L ==
=== Lionneta ===
Lionneta Benoit, 1979

- Lionneta gerlachi Saaristo, 2001 — Seychelles
- Lionneta mahensis Benoit, 1979 — Seychelles
- Lionneta orophila (Benoit, 1979) — Seychelles
- Lionneta praslinensis Benoit, 1979 — Seychelles
- Lionneta savyi (Benoit, 1979) — Seychelles
- Lionneta sechellensis Benoit, 1979 (type) — Seychelles
- Lionneta silhouettei Benoit, 1979 — Seychelles
- Lionneta veli Saaristo, 2002 — Seychelles

=== Longoonops ===
Longoonops Platnick & Dupérré, 2010

- Longoonops bicolor Platnick & Dupérré, 2010 (type) — Nicaragua, Costa Rica
- Longoonops chickeringi Platnick & Dupérré, 2010 — Panama
- Longoonops ellae Platnick, Dupérré & Berniker, 2013 — Cuba
- Longoonops gorda Platnick & Dupérré, 2010 — Virgin Is.
- Longoonops noctucus (Chickering, 1969) — Virgin Is.
- Longoonops padiscus (Chickering, 1969) — Jamaica

=== Lucetia ===
Lucetia Dumitrescu & Georgescu, 1983

- Lucetia distincta Dumitrescu & Georgescu, 1983 (type) — Cuba, Venezuela

== M ==
=== Malagiella ===
Malagiella Ubick & Griswold, 2011

- Malagiella ambalavo Ubick & Griswold, 2011 — Madagascar
- Malagiella andringitra Ubick & Griswold, 2011 — Madagascar
- Malagiella fisheri Ubick & Griswold, 2011 — Madagascar
- Malagiella goodmani Ubick & Griswold, 2011 — Madagascar
- Malagiella nikina Ubick & Griswold, 2011 — Madagascar
- Malagiella ranavalona Ubick & Griswold, 2011 — Madagascar
- Malagiella ranomafana Ubick & Griswold, 2011 (type) — Madagascar
- Malagiella toliara Ubick & Griswold, 2011 — Madagascar
- Malagiella valterova Ubick & Griswold, 2011 — Madagascar
- Malagiella vohiparara Ubick & Griswold, 2011 — Madagascar

=== Megabulbus ===
Megabulbus Saaristo, 2007

- Megabulbus sansan Saaristo, 2007 (type) — Israel

=== Megaoonops ===
Megaoonops

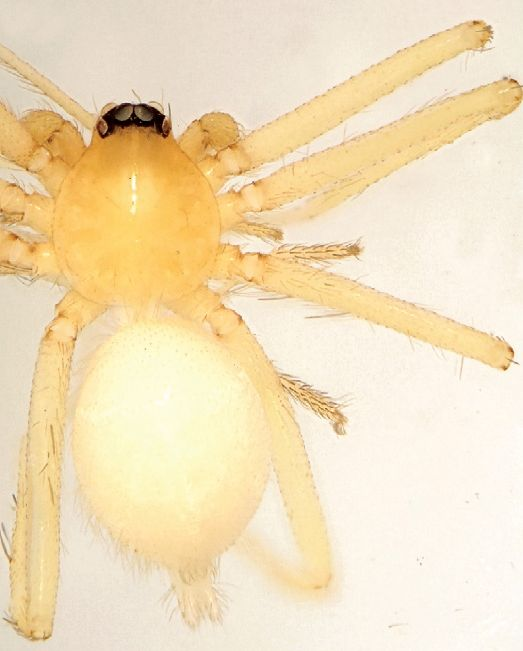
Megaoonops avrona, male

Megaoonops Saaristo, 2007

- Megaoonops avrona Saaristo, 2007 (type) — Israel

=== Melchisedec ===
Melchisedec Fannes, 2010

- Melchisedec birni Fannes, 2010 — Niger
- Melchisedec thevenot Fannes, 2010 (type) — West, East Africa

=== Molotra ===
Molotra Ubick & Griswold, 2011

- Molotra katarinae Ubick & Griswold, 2011 — Madagascar
- Molotra milloti Ubick & Griswold, 2011 — Madagascar
- Molotra molotra Ubick & Griswold, 2011 (type) — Madagascar
- Molotra ninae Ubick & Griswold, 2011 — Madagascar
- Molotra suzannae Ubick & Griswold, 2011 — Madagascar
- Molotra tsingy Ubick & Griswold, 2011 — Madagascar

== N ==
=== Neotrops ===
Neotrops Grismado & Ramírez, 2013

- Neotrops amacuro Grismado & Ramírez, 2013 — Venezuela
- Neotrops avalosi Grismado & Ramírez, 2013 — Paraguay, Argentina
- Neotrops caparu Grismado & Ramírez, 2013 — Colombia
- Neotrops darwini Grismado & Ramírez, 2013 (type) — Argentina, Uruguay
- Neotrops donaldi (Chickering, 1951) — Panama
- Neotrops izquierdoi Grismado & Ramírez, 2013 — Bolivia
- Neotrops kopuchianae Grismado & Ramírez, 2013 — Bolivia
- Neotrops labarquei Grismado & Ramírez, 2013 — Uruguay
- Neotrops lopardoae Grismado & Ramírez, 2013 — Argentina
- Neotrops lorenae Grismado & Ramírez, 2013 — Argentina, Uruguay
- Neotrops maracay Grismado & Ramírez, 2013 — Venezuela
- Neotrops nigromaculatus (Mello-Leitão, 1944) — Argentina, Uruguay
- Neotrops pakitza Grismado & Ramírez, 2013 — Peru
- Neotrops piacentinii Grismado & Ramírez, 2013 — Argentina
- Neotrops pithecia Grismado & Ramírez, 2013 — Peru
- Neotrops platnicki Grismado & Ramírez, 2013 — Ecuador
- Neotrops poguazu Grismado & Ramírez, 2013 — Argentina
- Neotrops pombero Grismado & Ramírez, 2013 — Paraguay, Argentina
- Neotrops ramirezi Izquierdo & Grismado, 2014 — Colombia
- Neotrops rubioi Grismado & Ramírez, 2013 — Paraguay, Argentina
- Neotrops santamarta Grismado & Ramírez, 2013 — Colombia
- Neotrops sciosciae Grismado & Ramírez, 2013 — Argentina, Uruguay
- Neotrops silvae Grismado & Ramírez, 2013 — Peru
- Neotrops trapellus (Chickering, 1970) — Trinidad, Venezuela
- Neotrops tucumanus (Simon, 1907) — Argentina
- Neotrops waorani Grismado & Ramírez, 2013 — Ecuador
- Neotrops yabare Grismado & Ramírez, 2013 — Bolivia
- Neotrops yunga Grismado & Ramírez, 2013 — Argentina

=== Neoxyphinus ===
Neoxyphinus Birabén, 1953

- Neoxyphinus almerim Feitosa & Bonaldo, 2017 — Brazil
- Neoxyphinus amazonicus Moss & Feitosa, 2016 — Colombia, Brazil
- Neoxyphinus axe Abrahim & Brescovit, 2012 — Brazil
- Neoxyphinus barreirosi Abrahim & Bonaldo, 2012 — Colombia, Venezuela, Guyana, Brazil
- Neoxyphinus belterra Feitosa & Ruiz, 2017 — Brazil
- Neoxyphinus beni Moss & Feitosa, 2016 — Bolivia
- Neoxyphinus boibumba Abrahim & Rheims, 2012 — Brazil
- Neoxyphinus cachimbo Feitosa & Moss, 2017 — Brazil
- Neoxyphinus cantareira Feitosa & Ruiz, 2017 — Brazil
- Neoxyphinus capiranga Feitosa & Moss, 2017 — Brazil
- Neoxyphinus caprichoso Feitosa & Ruiz, 2017 — Brazil
- Neoxyphinus carigoblin Feitosa & Moss, 2017 — Brazil
- Neoxyphinus cavus Feitosa & Bonaldo, 2017 — Brazil
- Neoxyphinus caxiuana Feitosa & Moss, 2017 — Brazil
- Neoxyphinus celluliticus Feitosa & Ruiz, 2017 — Brazil
- Neoxyphinus coari Feitosa & Moss, 2017 — Brazil
- Neoxyphinus coca Moss & Feitosa, 2016 — Ecuador
- Neoxyphinus crasto Feitosa & Moss, 2017 — Brazil
- Neoxyphinus ducke Feitosa & Ruiz, 2017 — Brazil
- Neoxyphinus furtivus (Chickering, 1968) — Jamaica, Trinidad, Brazil
- Neoxyphinus garantido Feitosa & Ruiz, 2017 — Brazil
- Neoxyphinus gregoblin Abrahim & Santos, 2012 — Venezuela
- Neoxyphinus hispidus (Dumitrescu & Georgescu, 1987) — Venezuela
- Neoxyphinus inca Moss & Ruiz, 2016 — Peru
- Neoxyphinus jacareacanga Feitosa & Ruiz, 2017 — Brazil
- Neoxyphinus keyserlingi (Simon, 1907) — Brazil
- Neoxyphinus macuna Moss & Ruiz, 2016 — Colombia
- Neoxyphinus meurei Feitosa & Bonaldo, 2017 — Brazil
- Neoxyphinus murici Feitosa & Bonaldo, 2017 — Brazil
- Neoxyphinus mutum Feitosa & Moss, 2017 — Brazil
- Neoxyphinus novalima Feitosa & Ruiz, 2017 — Brazil
- Neoxyphinus ornithogoblin Feitosa & Bonaldo, 2017 — Brazil
- Neoxyphinus paraiba Feitosa & Moss, 2017 — Brazil
- Neoxyphinus paraty Feitosa & Ruiz, 2017 — Brazil
- Neoxyphinus petrogoblin Abrahim & Ott, 2012 — Colombia, Ecuador, Peru, Brazil
- Neoxyphinus pure Moss & Bonaldo, 2016 — Colombia
- Neoxyphinus rio Feitosa & Bonaldo, 2017 — Brazil
- Neoxyphinus saarineni Moss & Bonaldo, 2016 — Venezuela
- Neoxyphinus sax Feitosa & Bonaldo, 2017 — Brazil
- Neoxyphinus simsinho Feitosa & Bonaldo, 2017 — Brazil
- Neoxyphinus stigmatus Feitosa & Bonaldo, 2017 — Brazil
- Neoxyphinus termitophilus (Bristowe, 1938) — Brazil, Argentina
- Neoxyphinus trujillo Moss & Bonaldo, 2016 — Venezuela
- Neoxyphinus tucuma Feitosa & Moss, 2017 — Brazil
- Neoxyphinus tuparro Moss & Ruiz, 2016 — Colombia
- Neoxyphinus xyphinoides (Chamberlin & Ivie, 1942) — Guyana
- Neoxyphinus yacambu Moss & Feitosa, 2016 — Venezuela
- Neoxyphinus yekuana Moss & Feitosa, 2016 — Venezuela

=== Nephrochirus ===
Nephrochirus Simon, 1910

- Nephrochirus copulatus Simon, 1910 (type) — Namibia

=== Niarchos ===
Niarchos Platnick & Dupérré, 2010

- Niarchos baehrae Platnick & Dupérré, 2010 — Ecuador
- Niarchos barragani Platnick & Dupérré, 2010 — Ecuador
- Niarchos bonaldoi Platnick & Dupérré, 2010 — Ecuador
- Niarchos cotopaxi Platnick & Dupérré, 2010 (type) — Ecuador
- Niarchos elicioi Platnick & Dupérré, 2010 — Ecuador
- Niarchos facundoi Platnick & Dupérré, 2010 — Ecuador
- Niarchos florezi Platnick & Dupérré, 2010 — Colombia
- Niarchos foreroi Platnick & Dupérré, 2010 — Ecuador
- Niarchos grismadoi Platnick & Dupérré, 2010 — Ecuador
- Niarchos keili Platnick & Dupérré, 2010 — Ecuador
- Niarchos ligiae Platnick & Dupérré, 2010 — Ecuador
- Niarchos loja Platnick & Dupérré, 2010 — Ecuador, Peru
- Niarchos matiasi Platnick & Dupérré, 2010 — Ecuador
- Niarchos michaliki Platnick & Dupérré, 2010 — Ecuador
- Niarchos normani Dupérré & Tapia, 2017 — Ecuador
- Niarchos palenque Platnick & Dupérré, 2010 — Ecuador
- Niarchos ramirezi Platnick & Dupérré, 2010 — Ecuador
- Niarchos rheimsae Platnick & Dupérré, 2010 — Ecuador
- Niarchos santosi Platnick & Dupérré, 2010 — Ecuador
- Niarchos scutatus Platnick & Dupérré, 2010 — Ecuador
- Niarchos tapiai Platnick & Dupérré, 2010 — Ecuador
- Niarchos vegai Platnick & Dupérré, 2010 — Ecuador
- Niarchos wygodzinskyi Platnick & Dupérré, 2010 — Colombia

=== Noideattella ===
Noideattella Álvarez-Padilla, Ubick & Griswold, 2012

- Noideattella amboa Álvarez-Padilla, Ubick & Griswold, 2012 — Madagascar
- Noideattella assumptia (Saaristo, 2001) — Madagascar, Seychelles (Assumption Is., Farquhar Is.)
- Noideattella famafa Álvarez-Padilla, Ubick & Griswold, 2012 — Madagascar
- Noideattella fantara Álvarez-Padilla, Ubick & Griswold, 2012 — Madagascar
- Noideattella farihy Álvarez-Padilla, Ubick & Griswold, 2012 — Madagascar
- Noideattella gamela Álvarez-Padilla, Ubick & Griswold, 2012 — Madagascar
- Noideattella lakana Álvarez-Padilla, Ubick & Griswold, 2012 — Madagascar
- Noideattella mamba Álvarez-Padilla, Ubick & Griswold, 2012 — Madagascar
- Noideattella omby Álvarez-Padilla, Ubick & Griswold, 2015 — Madagascar
- Noideattella saka Álvarez-Padilla, Ubick & Griswold, 2012 — Madagascar
- Noideattella sylvnata Álvarez-Padilla, Ubick & Griswold, 2015 — Madagascar
- Noideattella tany Álvarez-Padilla, Ubick & Griswold, 2012 — Madagascar
- Noideattella tsiba Álvarez-Padilla, Ubick & Griswold, 2012 — Madagascar

=== Noonops ===
Noonops Platnick & Berniker, 2013

- Noonops beattyi Platnick & Berniker, 2013 — Mexico
- Noonops californicus Platnick & Berniker, 2013 — USA
- Noonops chapul Platnick & Berniker, 2013 — Mexico
- Noonops chilapensis (Chamberlin & Ivie, 1936) — Mexico
- Noonops coachella Platnick & Berniker, 2013 — USA
- Noonops culiacan Platnick & Berniker, 2013 — Mexico
- Noonops floridanus (Chamberlin & Ivie, 1935) (type) — USA, Bahama Is.
- Noonops furtivus (Gertsch, 1936) — USA, Mexico
- Noonops iviei Platnick & Berniker, 2013 — Mexico
- Noonops joshua Platnick & Berniker, 2013 — USA
- Noonops mesa Platnick & Berniker, 2013 — Mexico
- Noonops minutus Platnick & Berniker, 2013 — Mexico
- Noonops miraflores Platnick & Berniker, 2013 — Mexico
- Noonops mortero Platnick & Berniker, 2013 — USA
- Noonops naci Platnick & Berniker, 2013 — Mexico
- Noonops ocotillo Platnick & Berniker, 2013 — USA
- Noonops puebla (Gertsch & Davis, 1942) — Mexico
- Noonops skinner Platnick & Berniker, 2013 — USA
- Noonops sonora (Gertsch & Davis, 1942) — USA, Mexico
- Noonops tarantula Platnick & Berniker, 2013 — Mexico
- Noonops taxquillo Platnick & Berniker, 2013 — Mexico
- Noonops tonila Platnick & Berniker, 2013 — Mexico
- Noonops willisi Platnick & Berniker, 2013 — Mexico

== O ==
=== Oonopinus ===
Oonopinus Simon, 1893

- Oonopinus angustatus (Simon, 1882) (type) — Spain, France (mainland, Corsica), Algeria
- Oonopinus aurantiacus Simon, 1893 — Venezuela
- Oonopinus bistriatus Simon, 1907 — Sierra Leone
- Oonopinus corneus Tong & Li, 2008 — China
- Oonopinus ionicus Brignoli, 1979 — Greece
- Oonopinus kilikus Suman, 1965 — Seychelles, Hawaii
- Oonopinus oceanicus Marples, 1955 — Samoa, Niue
- Oonopinus pilulus Suman, 1965 — China, USA (Hawaii)
- Oonopinus pruvotae Berland, 1929 — New Caledonia

=== Oonopoides ===
Oonopoides Bryant, 1940

- Oonopoides anoxus (Chickering, 1970) — Panama
- Oonopoides bolivari Dumitrescu & Georgescu, 1987 — Venezuela
- Oonopoides cartago Platnick & Berniker, 2013 — Costa Rica, Panama
- Oonopoides catemaco Platnick & Berniker, 2013 — Mexico
- Oonopoides cavernicola Dumitrescu & Georgescu, 1983 — Cuba
- Oonopoides chicanna Platnick & Berniker, 2013 — Mexico
- Oonopoides cristo Platnick & Berniker, 2013 — Costa Rica
- Oonopoides endicus (Chickering, 1971) — USA, Bahama Is.
- Oonopoides habanensis Dumitrescu & Georgescu, 1983 — Cuba
- Oonopoides hondo Platnick & Berniker, 2013 — Honduras
- Oonopoides humboldti Dumitrescu & Georgescu, 1983 — Cuba
- Oonopoides iviei Platnick & Berniker, 2013 — USA, Bahama Is.
- Oonopoides kaplanae Platnick & Berniker, 2013 — Mexico
- Oonopoides maxillaris Bryant, 1940 (type) — Cuba
- Oonopoides mitchelli (Gertsch, 1977) — Mexico
- Oonopoides orghidani Dumitrescu & Georgescu, 1983 — Cuba
- Oonopoides pallidulus (Chickering, 1951) — Panama, possibly Jamaica
- Oonopoides pilosus Dumitrescu & Georgescu, 1983 — Cuba
- Oonopoides secretus (Gertsch, 1936) — USA, Mexico
- Oonopoides singularis Dumitrescu & Georgescu, 1983 — Cuba
- Oonopoides upala Platnick & Berniker, 2013 — Costa Rica
- Oonopoides zullinii Brignoli, 1974 — Mexico

=== Oonops ===
Oonops Templeton, 1835

- Oonops acanthopus Simon, 1907 — Brazil
- Oonops alticola Berland, 1914 — East Africa
- Oonops amacus Chickering, 1970 — Trinidad
- Oonops amoenus Dalmas, 1916 — France
- Oonops aristelus Chickering, 1972 — Antigua and Barbuda (Antigua)
- Oonops balanus Chickering, 1971 — Caribbean
- Oonops caecus Benoit, 1975 — Lesotho
- Oonops citrinus Berland, 1914 — East Africa
- Oonops cubanus Dumitrescu & Georgescu, 1983 — Cuba
- Oonops cuervus Gertsch & Davis, 1942 — Mexico
- Oonops domesticus Dalmas, 1916 — Europe, Georgia
- Oonops ebenecus Chickering, 1972 — Puerto Rico
- Oonops figuratus Simon, 1892 — St. Vincent, Venezuela
- Oonops gavarrensis Bosselaers, 2017 — Spain
- Oonops globimanus Simon, 1892 — St. Vincent, Venezuela
- Oonops hasselti Strand, 1906 — Scandinavia
- Oonops itascus Chickering, 1970 — Trinidad
- Oonops leai Rainbow, 1920 — Australia (Lord Howe Is.)
- Oonops leitaoni Bristowe, 1938 — Brazil
- Oonops longespinosus Denis, 1937 — Algeria
- Oonops longipes Berland, 1914 — East Africa
- Oonops loxoscelinus Simon, 1893 — Venezuela
- Oonops lubricus Dalmas, 1916 — France
- Oonops mahnerti Brignoli, 1974 — Greece
- Oonops minutus Dumitrescu & Georgescu, 1983 — Cuba
- Oonops oblucus Chickering, 1972 — Jamaica
- Oonops olitor Simon, 1911 — Algeria
- Oonops ornatus Chickering, 1970 — Panama
- Oonops persitus Chickering, 1970 — Panama
- Oonops petulans Gertsch & Davis, 1942 — Mexico
- Oonops placidus Dalmas, 1916 — France
  - Oonops placidus corsicus Dalmas, 1916 — France, Italy
- Oonops procerus Simon, 1882 — France, Spain
- Oonops propinquus Dumitrescu & Georgescu, 1983 — Cuba
- Oonops pulcher Templeton, 1835 (type) — Europe, North Africa. Introduced to Tasmania
  - Oonops pulcher hispanicus Dalmas, 1916 — Spain
- Oonops pulicarius Simon, 1892 — St. Vincent, Venezuela
- Oonops reddelli Gertsch, 1977 — Mexico
- Oonops reticulatus Petrunkevitch, 1925 — Costa Rica, Panama, Puerto Rico, Trinidad
- Oonops ronoxus Chickering, 1971 — Virgin Is.
- Oonops rowlandi Gertsch, 1977 — Mexico
- Oonops sativus Chickering, 1970 — Trinidad
- Oonops sicorius Chickering, 1970 — Curaçao
- Oonops stylifer Gertsch, 1936 — USA
- Oonops tectulus Chickering, 1970 — Trinidad
- Oonops triangulipes Karsch, 1881 — Micronesia
- Oonops tubulatus Dalmas, 1916 — Portugal, Algeria
- Oonops vestus Chickering, 1970 — Trinidad
- Oonops viridans Bryant, 1942 — Puerto Rico

=== Opopaea ===
Opopaea Simon, 1892

- Opopaea aculeata Baehr & Harvey, 2013 — Australia (Western Australia)
- Opopaea acuminata Baehr, 2013 — Australia (New South Wales)
- Opopaea addsae Baehr & Smith, 2013 — Australia (New South Wales)
- Opopaea alje Saaristo & Marusik, 2008 — Tanzania
- Opopaea ameyi Baehr, 2013 — Australia (Queensland)
- Opopaea amieu Baehr, 2013 — New Caledonia
- Opopaea andranomay Andriamalala & Hormiga, 2013 — Madagascar
- Opopaea andringitra Andriamalala & Hormiga, 2013 — Madagascar
- Opopaea ankarafantsika Andriamalala & Hormiga, 2013 — Madagascar
- Opopaea ankarana Andriamalala & Hormiga, 2013 — Madagascar
- Opopaea antoniae Baehr, 2011 — Australia (Queensland, New South Wales)
- Opopaea antsalova Andriamalala & Hormiga, 2013 — Madagascar
- Opopaea antsiranana Andriamalala & Hormiga, 2013 — Madagascar
- Opopaea apicalis (Simon, 1893) (type) — Indonesia, Philippines, Thailand. Introduced to USA, Mexico, Panama, Ecuador, Seychelles, Pacific Is.
- Opopaea aurantiaca Baehr & Harvey, 2013 — Australia (Western Australia)
- Opopaea auriforma Tong & Li, 2015 — China
- Opopaea banksi (Hickman, 1950) — Australia (South Australia)
- Opopaea batanguena Barrion & Litsinger, 1995 — Philippines
- Opopaea bemaraha Andriamalala & Hormiga, 2013 — Madagascar
- Opopaea bemarivo Andriamalala & Hormiga, 2013 — Madagascar
- Opopaea berenty Andriamalala & Hormiga, 2013 — Madagascar
- Opopaea berlandi (Simon & Fage, 1922) — East Africa
- Opopaea betioky Andriamalala & Hormiga, 2013 — Madagascar
- Opopaea bicolor Baehr, 2013 — New Caledonia
- Opopaea billroth Baehr & Harvey, 2013 — Australia (Western Australia)
- Opopaea botswana Saaristo & Marusik, 2008 — Botswana
- Opopaea brisbanensis Baehr, 2013 — Australia (Queensland)
- Opopaea broadwater Baehr, 2013 — Australia (Queensland)
- Opopaea burwelli Baehr, 2013 — New Caledonia
- Opopaea bushblitz Baehr, 2013 — Australia (New South Wales)
- Opopaea calcaris Baehr, 2013 — New Caledonia
- Opopaea callani Baehr & Harvey, 2013 — Australia (Western Australia)
- Opopaea calona Chickering, 1969 — USA
- Opopaea carnarvon Baehr, 2013 — Australia (Queensland)
- Opopaea carteri Baehr, 2013 — Australia (Queensland)
- Opopaea chrisconwayi Baehr & Smith, 2013 — Australia (Queensland)
- Opopaea chunglinchaoi Barrion, Barrion-Dupo & Heong, 2013 — China
- Opopaea concolor (Blackwall, 1859) — Tropical Africa. Introduced to Hawaii, North, Central and South America
- Opopaea conujaingensis (Xu, 1986) — China
- Opopaea cornuta Yin & Wang, 1984 — China, Taiwan, Laos, Iran?
- Opopaea cowra Baehr & Harvey, 2013 — Australia (Western Australia)
- Opopaea deserticola Simon, 1892 — USA (Florida), Mexico to Panama, Brazil, Caribbean Is. Introduced to Canary Is., Germany, Japan (Ogasawara Is.), Pacific Is.
- Opopaea diaolaushan Tong & Li, 2010 — China
- Opopaea douglasi Baehr, 2013 — Australia (Queensland)
- Opopaea durranti Baehr & Harvey, 2013 — Australia (Western Australia)
- Opopaea ectognophus Harvey & Edward, 2007 — Australia (Western Australia)
- Opopaea ephemera Baehr, 2013 — Australia (Northern Territory)
- Opopaea euphorbicola Strand, 1909 — Ascension Is.
- Opopaea exoculata Baehr & Harvey, 2013 — Australia (Western Australia)
- Opopaea fiji Baehr, 2013 — Fiji
- Opopaea fishriver Baehr, 2013 — Australia (Northern Territory)
- Opopaea flabellata Tong & Li, 2015 — China
- Opopaea flava Baehr & Harvey, 2013 — Australia (Western Australia)
- Opopaea floridana (Banks, 1896) — USA
- Opopaea foulpointe Andriamalala & Hormiga, 2013 — Madagascar
- Opopaea foveolata Roewer, 1963 — Pacific Is.
- Opopaea fragilis Baehr & Harvey, 2013 — Australia (Western Australia)
- Opopaea framenaui Baehr & Harvey, 2013 — Australia (Western Australia)
- Opopaea furcula Tong & Li, 2010 — China
- Opopaea gabon Saaristo & Marusik, 2008 — Gabon
- Opopaea gaborone Saaristo & Marusik, 2008 — Botswana
- Opopaea gerstmeieri Baehr, 2013 — Australia (New South Wales)
- Opopaea gibbifera Tong & Li, 2008 — China
- Opopaea gilliesi Baehr, 2013 — Australia (Northern Territory)
- Opopaea goloboffi Baehr, 2013 — New Caledonia
- Opopaea gracilis Baehr & Harvey, 2013 — Australia (Western Australia)
- Opopaea gracillima Baehr & Harvey, 2013 — Australia (Western Australia)
- Opopaea harmsi Baehr & Harvey, 2013 — Australia (Western Australia)
- Opopaea hawaii Baehr, 2013 — Hawaii
- Opopaea hoplites (Berland, 1914) — East Africa
- Opopaea ita Ott, 2003 — Brazil
- Opopaea itampolo Andriamalala & Hormiga, 2013 — Madagascar
- Opopaea johannae Baehr & Harvey, 2013 — Australia (Western Australia)
- Opopaea johardingae Baehr, 2013 — Australia (Northern Territory)
- Opopaea jonesae Baehr, 2011 — Australia (Queensland)
- Opopaea julianneae Baehr & Ott, 2013 — Australia (Western Australia)
- Opopaea kirindy Andriamalala & Hormiga, 2013 — Madagascar
- Opopaea kulczynskii (Berland, 1914) — East Africa
- Opopaea lambkinae Baehr, 2013 — Australia (Queensland)
- Opopaea lebretoni Baehr, 2013 — Australia (New South Wales)
- Opopaea leica Baehr, 2011 — Australia (Queensland)
- Opopaea leichhardti Baehr, 2013 — Australia (Queensland)
- Opopaea lemniscata Tong & Li, 2013 — Laos
- Opopaea linea Baehr, 2013 — Australia (Queensland, New South Wales)
- Opopaea lingua Saaristo, 2007 — Israel
- Opopaea macula Tong & Li, 2015 — China
- Opopaea magna Baehr, 2013 — Australia (New South Wales)
- Opopaea mahafaly Andriamalala & Hormiga, 2013 — Madagascar
- Opopaea manderano Andriamalala & Hormiga, 2013 — Madagascar
- Opopaea manongarivo Andriamalala & Hormiga, 2013 — Madagascar
- Opopaea marangaroo Baehr & Harvey, 2013 — Australia (Western Australia)
- Opopaea margaretehoffmannae Baehr & Smith, 2013 — Australia (New South Wales)
- Opopaea margaritae (Denis, 1947) — Egypt
- Opopaea maroantsetra Andriamalala & Hormiga, 2013 — Comoros, Madagascar
- Opopaea martini Baehr, 2013 — Australia (New South Wales)
- Opopaea mattica Simon, 1893 — Gabon, South Africa
- Opopaea mcleani Baehr, 2013 — Australia (Queensland)
- Opopaea media Song & Xu, 1984 — China
- Opopaea meditata Gertsch & Davis, 1936 — USA
- Opopaea michaeli Baehr & Smith, 2013 — Australia (New South Wales)
- Opopaea millbrook Baehr, 2013 — Australia (South Australia)
- Opopaea milledgei Baehr, 2013 — Australia (New South Wales)
- Opopaea millstream Baehr & Harvey, 2013 — Australia (Western Australia)
- Opopaea mollis (Simon, 1907) — Sri Lanka
- Opopaea monteithi Baehr, 2013 — New Caledonia
- Opopaea mundy Baehr, 2013 — Australia (South Australia)
- Opopaea nadineae Baehr & Harvey, 2013 — Australia (Western Australia)
- Opopaea namoroka Andriamalala & Hormiga, 2013 — Madagascar
- Opopaea ndoua Baehr, 2013 — New Caledonia
- Opopaea nibasa Saaristo & van Harten, 2006 — Yemen
- Opopaea nitens Baehr, 2013 — Australia (New South Wales)
- Opopaea olivernashi Baehr, 2011 — Australia (Queensland)
- Opopaea ottoi Baehr, 2013 — Australia (New South Wales)
- Opopaea palau Baehr, 2013 — Palau Is.
- Opopaea pallida Baehr & Harvey, 2013 — Australia (Western Australia)
- Opopaea pannawonica Baehr & Ott, 2013 — Australia (Western Australia)
- Opopaea phineus Harvey & Edward, 2007 — Australia (Western Australia)
- Opopaea pilbara Baehr & Ott, 2013 — Australia (Western Australia)
- Opopaea plana Baehr, 2013 — Australia (New South Wales)
- Opopaea platnicki Baehr, 2013 — New Caledonia
- Opopaea plumula Yin & Wang, 1984 — China
- Opopaea preecei Baehr, 2013 — Australia (Northern Territory)
- Opopaea probosciella Saaristo, 2001 — Seychelles
- Opopaea proserpine Baehr, 2013 — Australia (Queensland)
- Opopaea punctata (O. Pickard-Cambridge, 1872) — Turkey, Lebanon, Israel
- Opopaea raveni Baehr, 2013 — New Caledonia
- Opopaea rigidula Tong & Li, 2015 — China
- Opopaea rixi Baehr & Harvey, 2013 — Australia (Western Australia)
- Opopaea robusta Baehr & Harvey, 2013 — Australia (Western Australia)
- Opopaea rogerkitchingi Baehr, 2011 — Australia (Queensland)
- Opopaea rugosa Baehr & Ott, 2013 — Australia (Western Australia)
- Opopaea saaristoi Wunderlich, 2011 — Cyprus
- Opopaea sallami Saaristo & van Harten, 2006 — Yemen
- Opopaea sanaa Saaristo & van Harten, 2006 — Yemen
- Opopaea sandranantitra Andriamalala & Hormiga, 2013 — Madagascar
- Opopaea santschii Brignoli, 1974 — Tunisia, Cyprus, Greece (Crete), Egypt, Israel
- Opopaea sanya Tong & Li, 2010 — China
- Opopaea sauteri Brignoli, 1974 — China, Taiwan
- Opopaea sedata Gertsch & Mulaik, 1940 — USA
- Opopaea semilunata Tong & Li, 2015 — China
- Opopaea shanasi Saaristo, 2007 — Israel
- Opopaea silhouettei (Benoit, 1979) — Seychelles. Introduced to Austral Is. (Rapa)
- Opopaea simoni (Berland, 1914) — East Africa
- Opopaea simplex Baehr, 2013 — Australia (New South Wales)
- Opopaea sown Baehr, 2011 — Australia (Queensland, New South Wales)
- Opopaea speciosa (Lawrence, 1952) — South Africa, Yemen
- Opopaea speighti Baehr, 2011 — Australia (Queensland)
- Opopaea spinosa Saaristo & van Harten, 2006 — Yemen
- Opopaea spinosiscorona Ranasinghe & Benjamin, 2018 — Sri Lanka
- Opopaea sponsa Brignoli, 1978 — Bhutan
- Opopaea stanisici Baehr, 2013 — Australia (Queensland)
- Opopaea stevensi Baehr, 2013 — Australia (South Australia)
- Opopaea striata Baehr, 2013 — New Caledonia
- Opopaea sturt Baehr, 2013 — Australia (New South Wales)
- Opopaea subtilis Baehr & Harvey, 2013 — Australia (Western Australia)
- Opopaea sudan Saaristo & Marusik, 2008 — Sudan
- Opopaea suelewisae Baehr & Smith, 2013 — Australia (New South Wales)
- Opopaea suspecta Saaristo, 2002 — Seychelles
- Opopaea syarakui (Komatsu, 1967) — Korea, Japan
- Opopaea sylvestrella Baehr & Smith, 2013 — Australia (New South Wales)
- Opopaea tenuis Baehr, 2013 — Australia (New South Wales)
- Opopaea torotorofotsy Andriamalala & Hormiga, 2013 — Madagascar
- Opopaea touho Baehr, 2013 — New Caledonia
- Opopaea triangularis Baehr & Harvey, 2013 — Australia (Western Australia)
- Opopaea tsimaloto Andriamalala & Hormiga, 2013 — Madagascar
- Opopaea tsimbazaza Andriamalala & Hormiga, 2013 — Madagascar
- Opopaea tsimembo Andriamalala & Hormiga, 2013 — Madagascar
- Opopaea tsingy Andriamalala & Hormiga, 2013 — Madagascar
- Opopaea tsinjoriaky Andriamalala & Hormiga, 2013 — Madagascar
- Opopaea tuberculata Baehr, 2013 — New Caledonia
- Opopaea tumida Tong & Li, 2013 — Laos
- Opopaea ulrichi Baehr, 2013 — Australia (Queensland)
- Opopaea ursulae Baehr, 2013 — Australia (New South Wales)
- Opopaea viamao Ott, 2003 — Brazil, Argentina
- Opopaea vitrispina Tong & Li, 2010 — China
- Opopaea vohibazaha Andriamalala & Hormiga, 2013 — Madagascar
- Opopaea wheelarra Baehr & Ott, 2013 — Australia (Western Australia)
- Opopaea whim Baehr & Harvey, 2013 — Australia (Western Australia)
- Opopaea wongalara Baehr, 2013 — Australia (Northern Territory)
- Opopaea yorki Baehr, 2013 — Australia (New South Wales)
- Opopaea yukii Baehr, 2011 — Australia (Queensland)
- Opopaea zhengi Tong & Li, 2015 — China

=== Orchestina ===
Orchestina Simon, 1882

- Orchestina acaciae Henrard & Jocqué, 2012 — Tanzania
- Orchestina aerumnae Brignoli, 1978 — Bhutan
- Orchestina algerica Dalmas, 1916 — Algeria
- Orchestina ampulla Henrard & Jocqué, 2012 — Tanzania
- Orchestina andianavarroi Izquierdo, 2017 — Argentina
- Orchestina apiculata Liu, Xiao & Xu, 2016 — China
- Orchestina aproeste Izquierdo, 2017 — Brazil
- Orchestina arabica Dalmas, 1916 — Yemen
- Orchestina aragua Izquierdo, 2017 — Venezuela
- Orchestina arboleda Izquierdo, 2017 — Colombia
- Orchestina atocongo Izquierdo, 2017 — Peru
- Orchestina auburndalensis Izquierdo, 2017 — USA
- Orchestina aureola Tong & Li, 2011 — China
- Orchestina bedu Saaristo & van Harten, 2002 — Yemen (Socotra)
- Orchestina bialata Liu, Xiao & Xu, 2016 — China
- Orchestina bolivar Izquierdo, 2017 — Venezuela
- Orchestina bonaldoi Izquierdo, 2017 — Brazil
- Orchestina cachai Izquierdo, 2017 — Chile
- Orchestina cajamarca Izquierdo, 2017 — Peru
- Orchestina caleta Izquierdo, 2017 — Chile
- Orchestina cali Izquierdo, 2017 — Colombia
- Orchestina campana Izquierdo, 2017 — Panama
- Orchestina catarina Izquierdo, 2017 — Brazil
- Orchestina caxiuana Izquierdo, 2017 — Brazil
- Orchestina chaparrita Izquierdo, 2017 — Mexico
- Orchestina chiriqui Izquierdo, 2017 — Costa Rica, Panama
- Orchestina cincta Simon, 1893 — South Africa
- Orchestina clavigera Henrard & Jocqué, 2012 — Kenya
- Orchestina clavulata Tong & Li, 2011 — China
- Orchestina coari Izquierdo, 2017 — Brazil
- Orchestina codalmasi Wunderlich, 2011 — Malaysia
- Orchestina comaina Izquierdo, 2017 — Peru
- Orchestina communis Henrard & Jocqué, 2012 — Ghana to Kenya
- Orchestina cornuta Henrard & Jocqué, 2012 — Cameroon
- Orchestina cristinae Izquierdo, 2017 — Brazil, Paraguay, Argentina
- Orchestina crypta Henrard & Jocqué, 2012 — Congo
- Orchestina curico Izquierdo, 2017 — Chile
- Orchestina dalmasi Denis, 1956 — Morocco
- Orchestina debakkeri Henrard & Jocqué, 2012 — Ghana
- Orchestina dentifera Simon, 1893 — Caribbean, Brazil. Introduced to Tanzania, Réunion, Seychelles, Sri Lanka
- Orchestina divisor Izquierdo, 2017 — Brazil
- Orchestina dubia O. Pickard-Cambridge, 1911 — Britain
- Orchestina ebriola Brignoli, 1972 — Greece
- Orchestina ecuatorensis Izquierdo, 2017 — Ecuador
- Orchestina elegans Simon, 1893 — Philippines
- Orchestina erwini Izquierdo, 2017 — Ecuador
- Orchestina fannesi Henrard & Jocqué, 2012 — Namibia, South Africa
- Orchestina fernandina Izquierdo, 2017 — Ecuador (Galapagos)
- Orchestina filandia Izquierdo, 2017 — Colombia
- Orchestina flagella Saaristo & van Harten, 2006 — Yemen
- Orchestina flava Ono, 2005 — Japan
- Orchestina foa Saaristo & van Harten, 2002 — Yemen (Socotra)
- Orchestina fractipes Henrard & Jocqué, 2012 — West, Central Africa
- Orchestina furcillata Wunderlich, 2008 — Azores
- Orchestina galapagos Izquierdo, 2017 — Jamaica, Panama, Ecuador (Galapagos)
- Orchestina gibbotibialis Henrard & Jocqué, 2012 — Kenya
- Orchestina gigabulbus Henrard & Jocqué, 2012 — Ghana
- Orchestina goblin Izquierdo, 2017 — Colombia, Ecuador, Peru
- Orchestina golem Izquierdo, 2017 — Ecuador, Peru, Brazil
- Orchestina granizo Izquierdo, 2017 — Chile
- Orchestina grismadoi Izquierdo, 2017 — Bolivia
- Orchestina griswoldi Izquierdo, 2017 — Costa Rica
- Orchestina guatemala Izquierdo, 2017 — Guatemala
- Orchestina hammamali Saaristo & van Harten, 2006 — Yemen
- Orchestina iemanja Izquierdo, 2017 — Brazil
- Orchestina infirma Seo, 2017 — Korea
- Orchestina intricata Henrard & Jocqué, 2012 — Somalia, Tanzania
- Orchestina itapety Izquierdo, 2017 — Brazil
- Orchestina jaiba Izquierdo, 2017 — Chile, Argentina
- Orchestina juruti Izquierdo, 2017 — Brazil
- Orchestina justini Saaristo, 2001 — Seychelles
- Orchestina kairi Izquierdo, 2017 — Trinidad
- Orchestina kamehameha Izquierdo, 2017 — USA (Hawaii)
- Orchestina kasuku Henrard & Jocqué, 2012 — Congo
- Orchestina labarquei Izquierdo, 2017 — Panama
- Orchestina lahj Saaristo & van Harten, 2006 — Yemen
- Orchestina lanceolata Henrard & Jocqué, 2012 — Cameroon
- Orchestina laselva Izquierdo, 2017 — Costa Rica, Ecuador
- Orchestina launcestoniensis Hickman, 1932 — Australia (Tasmania)
- Orchestina leon Izquierdo, 2017 — Brazil
- Orchestina longipes Dalmas, 1922 — Italy
- Orchestina losamigos Izquierdo, 2017 — Peru
- Orchestina luispi Izquierdo, 2017 — Argentina
- Orchestina macrofoliata Henrard & Jocqué, 2012 — Congo
- Orchestina madrededios Izquierdo, 2017 — Peru
- Orchestina magna Izquierdo, 2017 — Ecuador
- Orchestina mancocapac Izquierdo, 2017 — Peru
- Orchestina manicata Simon, 1893 — Sri Lanka, Vietnam
- Orchestina maracay Izquierdo, 2017 — Venezuela
- Orchestina maureen Saaristo, 2001 — Seychelles
- Orchestina mayo Izquierdo, 2017 — Ecuador
- Orchestina microfoliata Henrard & Jocqué, 2012 — Congo, Uganda
- Orchestina minutissima Denis, 1937 — Algeria, Spain
- Orchestina mirabilis Saaristo & van Harten, 2006 — Yemen
- Orchestina moaba Chamberlin & Ivie, 1935 — USA
- Orchestina molles Izquierdo, 2017 — Chile
- Orchestina moura Izquierdo, 2017 — Brazil
- Orchestina moyuchi Izquierdo, 2017 — Bolivia
- Orchestina multipunctata Liu, Xiao & Xu, 2016 — China
- Orchestina nadleri Chickering, 1969 — USA
- Orchestina nahuatl Izquierdo, 2017 — Mexico
- Orchestina nahuelbuta Izquierdo, 2017 — Chile
- Orchestina neblina Izquierdo, 2017 — Venezuela
- Orchestina obscura Chamberlin & Ivie, 1942 — USA
- Orchestina okitsui Oi, 1958 — Japan
- Orchestina osorno Izquierdo, 2017 — Chile
- Orchestina otonga Izquierdo, 2017 — Ecuador
- Orchestina pakitza Izquierdo, 2017 — Colombia, Peru
- Orchestina pan Izquierdo, 2017 — Panama
- Orchestina pandeazucar Izquierdo, 2017 — Chile
- Orchestina para Izquierdo, 2017 — Brazil
- Orchestina paupercula Dalmas, 1916 — Gabon
- Orchestina pavesii (Simon, 1873) (type) — Canary Is., Southwest Europe to Greece, Bulgaria, Algeria, Egypt, Yemen
- Orchestina pavesiiformis Saaristo, 2007 — Portugal, Spain, Israel. Introduced to USA, Brazil, Argentina, Uruguay
- Orchestina pilifera Dalmas, 1916 — Sri Lanka
- Orchestina pizarroi Izquierdo, 2017 — Chile
- Orchestina platnicki Izquierdo, 2017 — Colombia, Brazil, Argentina
- Orchestina predator Izquierdo, 2017 — Ecuador
- Orchestina probosciformis Henrard & Jocqué, 2012 — Congo, Uganda
- Orchestina quasimodo Izquierdo, 2017 — USA
- Orchestina quenies Izquierdo, 2017 — Chile
- Orchestina quijos Izquierdo, 2017 — Ecuador
- Orchestina ranchogrande Izquierdo, 2017 — Venezuela
- Orchestina rapaz Izquierdo, 2017 — Brazil
- Orchestina retiro Izquierdo, 2017 — Brazil
- Orchestina saaristoi Henrard & Jocqué, 2012 — Nigeria, Congo, Yemen
- Orchestina saltabunda Simon, 1893 — Venezuela
- Orchestina saltitans Banks, 1894 — USA
- Orchestina sanguinea Oi, 1955 — Japan
- Orchestina santodomingo Izquierdo, 2017 — Ecuador
- Orchestina sarava Izquierdo, 2017 — Brazil
- Orchestina saudade Izquierdo, 2017 — Brazil
- Orchestina sechellorum Benoit, 1979 — Seychelles
- Orchestina sedotmikha Saaristo, 2007 — Israel
- Orchestina setosa Dalmas, 1916 — France, Italy, Crete
- Orchestina shuar Izquierdo, 2017 — Ecuador
- Orchestina silvae Izquierdo, 2017 — Peru
- Orchestina simoni Dalmas, 1916 — France, Italy, Greece, Turkey
- Orchestina sinensis Xu, 1987 — China, Taiwan
- Orchestina sotoi Izquierdo, 2017 — Ecuador, Brazil
- Orchestina storozhenkoi (Saaristo & Marusik, 2004) — Russia (Far East)
- Orchestina striata Simon, 1909 — Vietnam
- Orchestina taruma Izquierdo, 2017 — Brazil
- Orchestina thoracica Xu, 1987 — China
- Orchestina topcui Danişman & Coşar, 2012 — Turkey
- Orchestina totoralillo Izquierdo, 2017 — Chile
- Orchestina truncata Wunderlich, 2004 — Costa Rica, Colombia, Ecuador
- Orchestina truncatula Tong & Li, 2011 — China, India
- Orchestina tubifera Simon, 1893 — Sri Lanka
- Orchestina tubulata Tong & Li, 2011 — China
- Orchestina tzantza Izquierdo, 2017 — Ecuador, Peru
- Orchestina ucumar Izquierdo, 2017 — Bolivia, Brazil, Argentina
- Orchestina utahana Chamberlin & Ivie, 1935 — USA, Mexico
- Orchestina vainuia Marples, 1955 — Samoa
- Orchestina valquiria Izquierdo, 2017 — Brazil
- Orchestina venezuela Izquierdo, 2017 — Venezuela
- Orchestina waorani Izquierdo, 2017 — Ecuador, Brazil
- Orchestina yanayacu Izquierdo, 2017 — Ecuador
- Orchestina yinggezui Tong & Li, 2011 — China
- Orchestina zhengi Tong & Li, 2011 — China
- Orchestina zingara Izquierdo, 2017 — Colombia

=== Ovobulbus ===
Ovobulbus Saaristo, 2007

- Ovobulbus boker Saaristo, 2007 (type) — Israel
- Ovobulbus bokerella Saaristo, 2007 — Egypt, Israel
- Ovobulbus elot Saaristo, 2007 — Israel

== P ==
=== Paradysderina ===
Paradysderina Platnick & Dupérré, 2011

- Paradysderina apurimac Platnick & Dupérré, 2011 — Peru
- Paradysderina asymmetrica Platnick & Dupérré, 2011 — Peru
- Paradysderina baehrae Platnick & Dupérré, 2011 — Ecuador
- Paradysderina bagua Platnick & Dupérré, 2011 — Peru
- Paradysderina boyaca Platnick & Dupérré, 2011 — Colombia
- Paradysderina carpish Platnick & Dupérré, 2011 — Peru
- Paradysderina carrizal Platnick & Dupérré, 2011 — Colombia
- Paradysderina centro Platnick & Dupérré, 2011 — Ecuador
- Paradysderina chinacota Platnick & Dupérré, 2011 — Colombia
- Paradysderina chingaza Platnick & Dupérré, 2011 — Colombia
- Paradysderina consuelo Platnick & Dupérré, 2011 — Peru
- Paradysderina convencion Platnick & Dupérré, 2011 — Peru
- Paradysderina dracula Platnick & Dupérré, 2011 — Ecuador
- Paradysderina excavata Platnick & Dupérré, 2011 — Peru
- Paradysderina fatima Platnick & Dupérré, 2011 — Peru
- Paradysderina fusiscuta Platnick & Dupérré, 2011 — Ecuador
- Paradysderina globosa (Keyserling, 1877) — Colombia, Peru
- Paradysderina hermani Platnick & Dupérré, 2011 — Ecuador
- Paradysderina huila Platnick & Dupérré, 2011 — Colombia
- Paradysderina imir Platnick & Dupérré, 2011 — Colombia
- Paradysderina lefty Platnick & Dupérré, 2011 — Ecuador
- Paradysderina leticia Platnick & Dupérré, 2011 — Colombia
- Paradysderina loreto Platnick & Dupérré, 2011 — Peru, Brazil
- Paradysderina lostayos Platnick & Dupérré, 2011 — Ecuador
- Paradysderina macho Platnick & Dupérré, 2011 — Peru
- Paradysderina maldonado Platnick & Dupérré, 2011 — Peru
- Paradysderina malkini Platnick & Dupérré, 2011 — Peru
- Paradysderina monstrosa Platnick & Dupérré, 2011 — Colombia
- Paradysderina montana (Keyserling, 1883) — Peru
- Paradysderina newtoni Platnick & Dupérré, 2011 — Peru
- Paradysderina pecki Platnick & Dupérré, 2011 — Ecuador
- Paradysderina pinzoni Platnick & Dupérré, 2011 — Colombia
- Paradysderina pira Platnick & Dupérré, 2011 — Colombia
- Paradysderina pithecia Platnick & Dupérré, 2011 — Peru
- Paradysderina piura Platnick & Dupérré, 2011 — Peru
- Paradysderina puyo Platnick & Dupérré, 2011 — Ecuador
- Paradysderina righty Platnick & Dupérré, 2011 — Ecuador
- Paradysderina rothae Platnick & Dupérré, 2011 — Peru
- Paradysderina sauce Platnick & Dupérré, 2011 — Peru
- Paradysderina schizo Platnick & Dupérré, 2011 — Peru
- Paradysderina silvae Platnick & Dupérré, 2011 — Peru
- Paradysderina sucumbios Platnick & Dupérré, 2011 — Ecuador
- Paradysderina tabaconas Platnick & Dupérré, 2011 — Peru
- Paradysderina tambo Platnick & Dupérré, 2011 — Peru
- Paradysderina tambopata Platnick & Dupérré, 2011 — Peru
- Paradysderina thayerae Platnick & Dupérré, 2011 — Peru
- Paradysderina vaupes Platnick & Dupérré, 2011 — Colombia
- Paradysderina vlad Platnick & Dupérré, 2011 — Ecuador
- Paradysderina watrousi Platnick & Dupérré, 2011 (type) — Peru
- Paradysderina wygodzinskyi Platnick & Dupérré, 2011 — Peru
- Paradysderina yanayacu Platnick & Dupérré, 2011 — Ecuador
- Paradysderina yasua Platnick & Dupérré, 2011 — Peru
- Paradysderina yasuni Platnick & Dupérré, 2011 — Ecuador
- Paradysderina zamora Platnick & Dupérré, 2011 — Ecuador

=== Patri ===
Patri Saaristo, 2001

- Patri david (Benoit, 1979) (type) — Seychelles

=== Pelicinus ===
Pelicinus Simon, 1892

- Pelicinus amrishi (Makhan & Ezzatpanah, 2011) — Iran
- Pelicinus churchillae Platnick, Dupérré, Ott, Baehr & Kranz-Baltensperger, 2012 — Solomon Is.
- Pelicinus damieu Platnick, Dupérré, Ott, Baehr & Kranz-Baltensperger, 2012 — New Caledonia
- Pelicinus deelemanae Platnick, Dupérré, Ott, Baehr & Kranz-Baltensperger, 2012 — Thailand
- Pelicinus duong Platnick, Dupérré, Ott, Baehr & Kranz-Baltensperger, 2012 — Vietnam
- Pelicinus johor Platnick, Dupérré, Ott, Baehr & Kranz-Baltensperger, 2012 — Malaysia
- Pelicinus khao Platnick, Dupérré, Ott, Baehr & Kranz-Baltensperger, 2012 — Thailand
- Pelicinus koghis Platnick, Dupérré, Ott, Baehr & Kranz-Baltensperger, 2012 — New Caledonia
- Pelicinus lachivala Platnick, Dupérré, Ott, Baehr & Kranz-Baltensperger, 2012 — India
- Pelicinus madurai Platnick, Dupérré, Ott, Baehr & Kranz-Baltensperger, 2012 — India
- Pelicinus marmoratus Simon, 1892 (type) — Tropical Asia. Introduced to Pacific Is., Caribbean, Brazil, Canary Is., Kenya, Seychelles
- Pelicinus monteithi Platnick, Dupérré, Ott, Baehr & Kranz-Baltensperger, 2012 — New Caledonia
- Pelicinus penang Platnick, Dupérré, Ott, Baehr & Kranz-Baltensperger, 2012 — Malaysia
- Pelicinus raveni Platnick, Dupérré, Ott, Baehr & Kranz-Baltensperger, 2012 — Fiji
- Pelicinus saaristoi Ott & Harvey, 2008 — Australia (Western Australia)
- Pelicinus sayam Platnick, Dupérré, Ott, Baehr & Kranz-Baltensperger, 2012 — Thailand
- Pelicinus schwendingeri Platnick, Dupérré, Ott, Baehr & Kranz-Baltensperger, 2012 — Thailand, China
- Pelicinus sengleti Platnick, Dupérré, Ott, Baehr & Kranz-Baltensperger, 2012 — Iran
- Pelicinus snooky Ranasinghe & Benjamin, 2018 — Sri Lanka
- Pelicinus tham Platnick, Dupérré, Ott, Baehr & Kranz-Baltensperger, 2012 — Laos
- Pelicinus tumpy Ranasinghe & Benjamin, 2018 — Sri Lanka

=== Pescennina ===
Pescennina Simon, 1903

- Pescennina arborea Platnick & Dupérré, 2011 — Panama, Colombia, Ecuador
- Pescennina cupida (Keyserling, 1881) — Colombia
- Pescennina epularis Simon, 1903 (type) — Venezuela
- Pescennina fusca Platnick & Dupérré, 2011 — Panama
- Pescennina gertschi Platnick & Dupérré, 2011 — Mexico
- Pescennina grismadoi Platnick & Dupérré, 2011 — Bolivia
- Pescennina ibarrai Platnick & Dupérré, 2011 — Mexico
- Pescennina iviei Platnick & Dupérré, 2011 — Mexico
- Pescennina laselva Platnick & Dupérré, 2011 — Costa Rica, Panama
- Pescennina loreto Platnick & Dupérré, 2011 — Peru
- Pescennina magdalena Platnick & Dupérré, 2011 — Colombia
- Pescennina murphyorum Platnick & Dupérré, 2011 — Nicaragua, Costa Rica
- Pescennina orellana Platnick & Dupérré, 2011 — Ecuador
- Pescennina otti Platnick & Dupérré, 2011 — Brazil
- Pescennina piura Platnick & Dupérré, 2011 — Peru
- Pescennina sasaima Platnick & Dupérré, 2011 — Colombia
- Pescennina sumidero Platnick & Dupérré, 2011 — Mexico
- Pescennina viquezi Platnick & Dupérré, 2011 — Costa Rica

=== Plectoptilus ===
Plectoptilus Simon, 1905

- Plectoptilus myops Simon, 1905 (type) — Indonesia (Java)

=== Ponsoonops ===
Ponsoonops Bolzern, 2014

- Ponsoonops bilzae Bolzern, 2014 — Costa Rica
- Ponsoonops bollo Bolzern, 2014 — Panama
- Ponsoonops boquete Bolzern, 2014 — Panama
- Ponsoonops coiba Bolzern, 2014 — Panama
- Ponsoonops duenas Bolzern, 2014 — Guatemala
- Ponsoonops fanselix Bolzern, 2014 — Panama
- Ponsoonops frio Bolzern, 2014 — Panama
- Ponsoonops hamus Bolzern, 2014 — Mexico, Belize, Guatemala
- Ponsoonops lavega Bolzern, 2014 — Hispaniola
- Ponsoonops lerida Bolzern, 2014 — Panama
- Ponsoonops lucha Bolzern, 2014 — Costa Rica
- Ponsoonops micans (Simon, 1893) — Venezuela
- Ponsoonops mirante Bolzern, 2014 — Panama
- Ponsoonops pansedro Bolzern, 2014 — Colombia
- Ponsoonops panto Bolzern, 2014 — Panama
- Ponsoonops salimsa Bolzern, 2014 — Panama
- Ponsoonops samadam Bolzern, 2014 — Costa Rica
- Ponsoonops sanvito Bolzern, 2014 (type) — Costa Rica
- Ponsoonops tacana Bolzern, 2014 — Mexico
- Ponsoonops viejo Bolzern, 2014 — Costa Rica
- Ponsoonops vuena Bolzern, 2014 — Panama
- Ponsoonops yumuri Bolzern, 2014 — Cuba

=== Predatoroonops ===
Predatoroonops Brescovit, Rheims & Ott, 2012

- Predatoroonops anna Brescovit, Rheims & Bonaldo, 2012 — Brazil
- Predatoroonops billy Brescovit, Rheims & Ott, 2012 — Brazil
- Predatoroonops blain Brescovit, Rheims & Ott, 2012 — Brazil
- Predatoroonops chicano Brescovit, Rheims & Santos, 2012 — Brazil
- Predatoroonops dillon Brescovit, Rheims & Bonaldo, 2012 — Brazil
- Predatoroonops dutch Brescovit, Rheims & Bonaldo, 2012 — Brazil
- Predatoroonops maceliot Brescovit, Rheims & Ott, 2012 — Brazil
- Predatoroonops mctiernani Brescovit, Rheims & Santos, 2012 — Brazil
- Predatoroonops olddemon Brescovit, Rheims & Santos, 2012 — Brazil
- Predatoroonops peterhalli Brescovit, Rheims & Santos, 2012 — Brazil
- Predatoroonops phillips Brescovit, Rheims & Santos, 2012 — Brazil
- Predatoroonops poncho Brescovit, Rheims & Ott, 2012 — Brazil
- Predatoroonops rickhawkins Brescovit, Rheims & Bonaldo, 2012 — Brazil
- Predatoroonops schwarzeneggeri Brescovit, Rheims & Ott, 2012 (type) — Brazil
- Predatoroonops vallarta Brescovit, Rheims & Bonaldo, 2012 — Brazil
- Predatoroonops valverde Brescovit, Rheims & Ott, 2012 — Brazil
- Predatoroonops yautja Brescovit, Rheims & Santos, 2012 — Brazil

=== Prethopalpus ===
Prethopalpus Baehr, Harvey, Burger & Thoma, 2012

- Prethopalpus alexanderi Baehr & Harvey, 2012 — Australia (Western Australia)
- Prethopalpus attenboroughi Baehr & Harvey, 2012 — Australia (Queensland)
- Prethopalpus bali Baehr, 2012 — Bali
- Prethopalpus bellicosus Baehr & Thoma, 2012 — Borneo
- Prethopalpus blosfeldsorum Baehr & Harvey, 2012 — Australia (Queensland)
- Prethopalpus boltoni Baehr & Harvey, 2012 — Australia (Western Australia)
- Prethopalpus brunei Baehr, 2012 — Borneo
- Prethopalpus callani Baehr & Harvey, 2012 — Australia (Western Australia)
- Prethopalpus cooperi Baehr & Harvey, 2012 — Australia (Western Australia)
- Prethopalpus deelemanae Baehr & Thoma, 2012 — Borneo
- Prethopalpus eberhardi Baehr & Harvey, 2012 — Australia (Western Australia)
- Prethopalpus fosuma (Burger, 2002) (type) — Indonesia (Java, Sumatra)
- Prethopalpus framenaui Baehr & Harvey, 2012 — Australia (Western Australia)
- Prethopalpus hainanensis Tong & Li, 2013 — China
- Prethopalpus humphreysi Baehr & Harvey, 2012 — Australia (Western Australia)
- Prethopalpus ilam Baehr, 2012 — Nepal
- Prethopalpus infernalis (Harvey & Edward, 2007) — Australia (Western Australia)
- Prethopalpus java Baehr, 2012 — Indonesia (Java)
- Prethopalpus julianneae Baehr & Harvey, 2012 — Australia (Western Australia)
- Prethopalpus khasi Baehr, 2012 — India
- Prethopalpus kintyre Baehr & Harvey, 2012 — Australia (Western Australia)
- Prethopalpus kranzae Baehr, 2012 — Indonesia (Sumatra)
- Prethopalpus kropfi Baehr, 2012 — Malaysia, Indonesia (Borneo)
- Prethopalpus leuser Baehr, 2012 — Indonesia (Sumatra)
- Prethopalpus madurai Baehr, 2012 — India
- Prethopalpus magnocularis Baehr & Thoma, 2012 — Borneo
- Prethopalpus mahanadi Baehr, 2012 — India
- Prethopalpus maini Baehr & Harvey, 2012 — Australia (Western Australia)
- Prethopalpus marionae Baehr & Harvey, 2012 — New Guinea, Australia (Queensland)
- Prethopalpus meghalaya Baehr, 2012 — India
- Prethopalpus oneillae Baehr & Harvey, 2012 — Australia (Western Australia)
- Prethopalpus pahang Baehr, 2012 — Malaysia, Singapore
- Prethopalpus pearsoni Baehr & Harvey, 2012 — Australia (Western Australia)
- Prethopalpus perak Baehr, 2012 — Malaysia
- Prethopalpus platnicki Baehr & Harvey, 2012 — Australia (Queensland)
- Prethopalpus rawlinsoni Baehr & Harvey, 2012 — Australia (Queensland)
- Prethopalpus sabah Baehr, 2012 — Borneo
- Prethopalpus sarawak Baehr, 2012 — Borneo
- Prethopalpus scanloni Baehr & Harvey, 2012 — Australia (Western Australia)
- Prethopalpus schwendingeri Baehr, 2012 — Singapore, Indonesia (Java, Sumatra)
- Prethopalpus tropicus Baehr & Harvey, 2012 — New Guinea, Australia (Queensland)
- Prethopalpus utara Baehr, 2012 — Indonesia (Sumatra)

=== Prida ===
Prida Saaristo, 2001

- Prida sechellensis (Benoit, 1979) (type) — Seychelles

=== Prodysderina ===
Prodysderina Platnick, Dupérré, Berniker & Bonaldo, 2013

- Prodysderina armata (Simon, 1893) (type) — Venezuela
- Prodysderina filandia Platnick, Dupérré, Berniker & Bonaldo, 2013 — Colombia
- Prodysderina janetae Platnick, Dupérré, Berniker & Bonaldo, 2013 — Venezuela
- Prodysderina megarmata Platnick, Dupérré, Berniker & Bonaldo, 2013 — Venezuela
- Prodysderina otun Platnick, Dupérré, Berniker & Bonaldo, 2013 — Colombia
- Prodysderina piedecuesta Platnick, Dupérré, Berniker & Bonaldo, 2013 — Colombia
- Prodysderina rasgon Platnick, Dupérré, Berniker & Bonaldo, 2013 — Colombia
- Prodysderina rollardae Platnick, Dupérré, Berniker & Bonaldo, 2013 — Venezuela
- Prodysderina santander Platnick, Dupérré, Berniker & Bonaldo, 2013 — Colombia

=== Pseudodysderina ===
Pseudodysderina Platnick, Berniker & Bonaldo, 2013

- Pseudodysderina beni Platnick, Berniker & Bonaldo, 2013 — Bolivia
- Pseudodysderina desultrix (Keyserling, 1881) (type) — Colombia, Ecuador, Peru, Brazil
- Pseudodysderina dracula Platnick, Berniker & Bonaldo, 2013 — Colombia
- Pseudodysderina hermani Platnick, Berniker & Bonaldo, 2013 — Ecuador
- Pseudodysderina manu Platnick, Berniker & Bonaldo, 2013 — Peru
- Pseudodysderina suiza Platnick, Berniker & Bonaldo, 2013 — Colombia
- Pseudodysderina utinga Platnick, Berniker & Bonaldo, 2013 — Brazil
- Pseudodysderina yungas Platnick, Berniker & Bonaldo, 2013 — Bolivia

=== Pseudoscaphiella ===
Pseudoscaphiella Simon, 1907

- Pseudoscaphiella parasita Simon, 1907 (type) — South Africa

=== Puan ===
Puan Izquierdo, 2012

- Puan chechehet Izquierdo, 2012 (type) — Argentina
- Puan nair Izquierdo, 2012 — Argentina

== R ==
=== Reductoonops ===
Reductoonops Platnick & Berniker, 2014

- Reductoonops almirante Platnick & Berniker, 2014 — Panama
- Reductoonops armeria Platnick & Berniker, 2014 — Mexico
- Reductoonops bayano Platnick & Berniker, 2014 — Panama
- Reductoonops berun Dupérré & Tapia, 2017 — Ecuador
- Reductoonops carpish Platnick & Berniker, 2014 — Peru
- Reductoonops celica Platnick & Berniker, 2014 — Ecuador
- Reductoonops chamela Platnick & Berniker, 2014 — Mexico
- Reductoonops diamant Platnick & Berniker, 2014 — Martinique
- Reductoonops domingo Platnick & Berniker, 2014 — Ecuador
- Reductoonops elqui Platnick & Berniker, 2014 — Chile
- Reductoonops escopeta Platnick & Berniker, 2014 — Panama
- Reductoonops ferry Platnick & Berniker, 2014 — Jamaica
- Reductoonops hato Platnick & Berniker, 2014 — Curaçao
- Reductoonops hedlite Platnick & Berniker, 2014 — Ecuador
- Reductoonops jabin Platnick & Berniker, 2014 — Mexico
- Reductoonops jatun Platnick & Berniker, 2014 — Ecuador
- Reductoonops leticia Platnick & Berniker, 2014 — Colombia
- Reductoonops lucha Platnick & Berniker, 2014 — Costa Rica
- Reductoonops marta Platnick & Berniker, 2014 — Colombia
- Reductoonops meta Platnick & Berniker, 2014 — Colombia
- Reductoonops molleturo Platnick & Berniker, 2014 — Ecuador
- Reductoonops monte Platnick & Berniker, 2014 — Costa Rica
- Reductoonops naci Platnick & Berniker, 2014 — Costa Rica, Panama
- Reductoonops napo Platnick & Berniker, 2014 — Ecuador
- Reductoonops niltepec Platnick & Berniker, 2014 — Mexico
- Reductoonops nubes Platnick & Berniker, 2014 — Mexico
- Reductoonops otonga Platnick & Berniker, 2014 — Ecuador
- Reductoonops palenque Platnick & Berniker, 2014 — Ecuador
- Reductoonops pichincha Platnick & Berniker, 2014 — Ecuador
- Reductoonops pinta Platnick & Berniker, 2014 — Ecuador
- Reductoonops real Platnick & Berniker, 2014 — Mexico
- Reductoonops sasaima Platnick & Berniker, 2014 — Colombia
- Reductoonops tandapi Platnick & Berniker, 2014 — Ecuador
- Reductoonops tina Platnick & Berniker, 2014 — Ecuador
- Reductoonops yasuni Platnick & Berniker, 2014 (type) — Ecuador

== S ==
=== Scaphidysderina ===
Scaphidysderina Platnick & Dupérré, 2011

- Scaphidysderina andersoni Platnick & Dupérré, 2011 — Ecuador
- Scaphidysderina baerti Platnick & Dupérré, 2011 — Ecuador
- Scaphidysderina cajamarca Platnick & Dupérré, 2011 — Peru
- Scaphidysderina chirin Dupérré & Tapia, 2017 — Ecuador
- Scaphidysderina cotopaxi Platnick & Dupérré, 2011 — Ecuador
- Scaphidysderina hormigai Platnick & Dupérré, 2011 — Colombia
- Scaphidysderina iguaque Platnick & Dupérré, 2011 — Colombia
- Scaphidysderina loja Platnick & Dupérré, 2011 — Ecuador
- Scaphidysderina lubanako Dupérré & Tapia, 2017 — Ecuador
- Scaphidysderina manu Platnick & Dupérré, 2011 — Peru
- Scaphidysderina molleturo Platnick & Dupérré, 2011 — Ecuador
- Scaphidysderina napo Platnick & Dupérré, 2011 — Ecuador
- Scaphidysderina pagoreni Platnick & Dupérré, 2011 — Peru
- Scaphidysderina palenque Platnick & Dupérré, 2011 — Ecuador *
- Scaphidysderina pinocchio Platnick & Dupérré, 2011 — Ecuador
- Scaphidysderina scutata Platnick & Dupérré, 2011 — Peru
- Scaphidysderina tandapi Platnick & Dupérré, 2011 — Ecuador
- Scaphidysderina tapiai Platnick & Dupérré, 2011 — Ecuador
- Scaphidysderina tayos Platnick & Dupérré, 2011 — Ecuador
- Scaphidysderina tsaran Dupérré & Tapia, 2017 — Ecuador

=== Scaphiella ===
Scaphiella Simon, 1892

- Scaphiella agocena Chickering, 1968 — Curaçao
- Scaphiella almirante Platnick & Dupérré, 2010 — Panama
- Scaphiella altamira Platnick & Dupérré, 2010 — Costa Rica, Panama
- Scaphiella antonio Platnick & Dupérré, 2010 — Costa Rica, Panama
- Scaphiella arima Platnick & Dupérré, 2010 — Trinidad
- Scaphiella ayacucho Platnick & Dupérré, 2010 — Venezuela
- Scaphiella barroana Gertsch, 1941 — Panama, Colombia
- Scaphiella bocas Platnick & Dupérré, 2010 — Panama
- Scaphiella bonda Platnick & Dupérré, 2010 — Colombia
- Scaphiella bopal Platnick & Dupérré, 2010 — Nicaragua
- Scaphiella bordoni Dumitrescu & Georgescu, 1987 — Venezuela
- Scaphiella bryantae Dumitrescu & Georgescu, 1983 — Cuba
- Scaphiella buck Platnick & Dupérré, 2010 — Virgin Is.
- Scaphiella campeche Platnick & Dupérré, 2010 — Mexico
- Scaphiella capim Platnick & Dupérré, 2010 — Brazil
- Scaphiella cata Platnick & Dupérré, 2010 — Venezuela
- Scaphiella cayo Platnick & Dupérré, 2010 — Belize
- Scaphiella ceiba Platnick & Dupérré, 2010 — Honduras
- Scaphiella chone Platnick & Dupérré, 2010 — Ecuador
- Scaphiella cocona Platnick & Dupérré, 2010 — Mexico
- Scaphiella curlena Chickering, 1968 — Jamaica
- Scaphiella cymbalaria Simon, 1892 (type) — Montserrat to St. Vincent
- Scaphiella etang Platnick & Dupérré, 2010 — Guadeloupe
- Scaphiella gracia Platnick & Dupérré, 2010 — Venezuela
- Scaphiella guatopo Platnick & Dupérré, 2010 — Venezuela
- Scaphiella guiria Platnick & Dupérré, 2010 — Venezuela, Trinidad
- Scaphiella hitoy Platnick & Dupérré, 2010 — Costa Rica
- Scaphiella hone Platnick & Dupérré, 2010 — Costa Rica, Panama
- Scaphiella icabaru Platnick & Dupérré, 2010 — Venezuela
- Scaphiella incha Platnick & Dupérré, 2010 — Ecuador
- Scaphiella irmaos Platnick & Dupérré, 2010 — Brazil
- Scaphiella kalunda Chickering, 1968 — Virgin Is.
- Scaphiella kartabo Platnick & Dupérré, 2010 — Guyana
- Scaphiella lancetilla Platnick & Dupérré, 2010 — Honduras
- Scaphiella longkey Platnick & Dupérré, 2010 — USA
- Scaphiella maculata Birabén, 1955 — Argentina
- Scaphiella manaus Platnick & Dupérré, 2010 — Brazil
- Scaphiella meta Platnick & Dupérré, 2010 — Colombia
- Scaphiella mico Platnick & Dupérré, 2010 — Guatemala
- Scaphiella miranda Platnick & Dupérré, 2010 — Venezuela
- Scaphiella muralla Platnick & Dupérré, 2010 — Honduras
- Scaphiella murici Platnick & Dupérré, 2010 — Brazil
- Scaphiella napo Platnick & Dupérré, 2010 — Ecuador
- Scaphiella osa Platnick & Dupérré, 2010 — Costa Rica
- Scaphiella pago Platnick & Dupérré, 2010 — Peru
- Scaphiella palenque Platnick & Dupérré, 2010 — Mexico
- Scaphiella palmillas Platnick & Dupérré, 2010 — Mexico
- Scaphiella penna Platnick & Dupérré, 2010 — Brazil
- Scaphiella pich Platnick & Dupérré, 2010 — Ecuador
- Scaphiella saba Platnick & Dupérré, 2010 — Saba
- Scaphiella scutiventris Simon, 1893 — Venezuela
- Scaphiella septella Chickering, 1968 — Virgin Is.
- Scaphiella simla Chickering, 1968 — Trinidad, Venezuela
- Scaphiella tena Platnick & Dupérré, 2010 — Ecuador
- Scaphiella tigre Platnick & Dupérré, 2010 — Venezuela
- Scaphiella tuxtla Platnick & Dupérré, 2010 — Mexico
- Scaphiella valencia Platnick & Dupérré, 2010 — Venezuela
- Scaphiella vicencio Platnick & Dupérré, 2010 — Colombia
- Scaphiella virgen Platnick & Dupérré, 2010 — Costa Rica
- Scaphiella vito Platnick & Dupérré, 2010 — Costa Rica
- Scaphiella weberi Chickering, 1968 — Trinidad
- Scaphiella williamsi Gertsch, 1941 — Panama

=== Scaphioides ===
Scaphioides Bryant, 1942

- Scaphioides bimini Platnick & Dupérré, 2012 — Bahama Is.
- Scaphioides camaguey Platnick & Dupérré, 2012 — Cuba
- Scaphioides campeche Platnick & Dupérré, 2012 — Mexico
- Scaphioides cletus (Chickering, 1969) — Jamaica
- Scaphioides cobre Platnick & Dupérré, 2012 — Cuba
- Scaphioides econotus (Chickering, 1969) — Puerto Rico
- Scaphioides gertschi Platnick & Dupérré, 2012 — Bahama Is.
- Scaphioides granpiedra Platnick & Dupérré, 2012 — Cuba
- Scaphioides halatus (Chickering, 1969) — Caribbean (Leeward Is.)
- Scaphioides hoffi (Chickering, 1969) — Jamaica
- Scaphioides irazu Platnick & Dupérré, 2012 — Costa Rica
- Scaphioides miches Platnick & Dupérré, 2012 — Hispaniola
- Scaphioides minuta (Chamberlin & Ivie, 1935) — USA
- Scaphioides nitens (Bryant, 1942) — Virgin Is.
- Scaphioides phonetus (Chickering, 1969) — Puerto Rico
- Scaphioides reducta Bryant, 1942 (type) — Virgin Is.
- Scaphioides reductoides Platnick & Dupérré, 2012 — Virgin Is.
- Scaphioides siboney Platnick & Dupérré, 2012 — Cuba
- Scaphioides yateras Platnick & Dupérré, 2012 — Cuba

=== Scaphios ===
Scaphios Platnick & Dupérré, 2010

- Scaphios cayambe Platnick & Dupérré, 2010 — Ecuador
- Scaphios jatun Platnick & Dupérré, 2010 — Ecuador
- Scaphios napo Platnick & Dupérré, 2010 — Ecuador
- Scaphios orellana Platnick & Dupérré, 2010 — Ecuador
- Scaphios planada Platnick & Dupérré, 2010 — Colombia
- Scaphios puyo Platnick & Dupérré, 2010 — Ecuador
- Scaphios wagra Platnick & Dupérré, 2010 — Ecuador
- Scaphios yanayacu Platnick & Dupérré, 2010 (type) — Ecuador

=== Semibulbus ===
Semibulbus Saaristo, 2007

- Semibulbus zekharya Saaristo, 2007 (type) — Israel

=== Semidysderina ===
Semidysderina Platnick & Dupérré, 2011

- Semidysderina donachui Platnick & Dupérré, 2011 — Colombia
- Semidysderina kochalkai Platnick & Dupérré, 2011 — Colombia
- Semidysderina lagila Platnick & Dupérré, 2011 (type) — Colombia
- Semidysderina marta Platnick & Dupérré, 2011 — Colombia
- Semidysderina mulleri Platnick & Dupérré, 2011 — Colombia
- Semidysderina sturmi Platnick & Dupérré, 2011 — Colombia

=== Setayeshoonops ===
Setayeshoonops Makhan & Ezzatpanah, 2011

- Setayeshoonops setayeshoonops Makhan & Ezzatpanah, 2011 (type) — Suriname

=== Sicariomorpha ===
Sicariomorpha Ott & Harvey, 2015

- Sicariomorpha maschwitzi (Wunderlich, 1995) (type) — Malaysia

=== Silhouettella ===
Silhouettella Benoit, 1979

- Silhouettella betalfa Saaristo, 2007 — Israel
- Silhouettella curieusei Benoit, 1979 (type) — Seychelles, Madagascar
- Silhouettella loricatula (Roewer, 1942) — Europe to Central Asia, North Africa, Canary Is.
- Silhouettella osmaniye Wunderlich, 2011 — Turkey, Azerbaijan
- Silhouettella perisalma Álvarez-Padilla, Ubick & Griswold, 2015 — Madagascar
- Silhouettella perismontes Álvarez-Padilla, Ubick & Griswold, 2015 — Madagascar
- Silhouettella saaristoi Ranasinghe & Benjamin, 2018 — Sri Lanka
- Silhouettella snippy Ranasinghe & Benjamin, 2018 — Sri Lanka
- Silhouettella tiggy Ranasinghe & Benjamin, 2018 — Sri Lanka
- Silhouettella tomer Saaristo, 2007 — Israel
- Silhouettella usgutra Saaristo & van Harten, 2002 — Yemen (Socotra)

=== Simlops ===
Simlops Bonaldo, Ott & Ruiz, 2014

- Simlops bandeirante Ott, 2014 — Brazil
- Simlops bodanus (Chickering, 1968) — Trinidad
- Simlops cachorro Ruiz, 2014 — Colombia
- Simlops campinarana Brescovit, 2014 — Brazil
- Simlops cristinae Santos, 2014 — Brazil
- Simlops guatopo Brescovit, 2014 — Venezuela
- Simlops guyanensis Santos, 2014 — Guyana
- Simlops jamesbondi Bonaldo, 2014 — Brazil
- Simlops juruti Bonaldo, 2014 — Brazil
- Simlops kartabo Feitosa & Bonaldo, 2017 — Guyana
- Simlops machadoi Ott, 2014 — Brazil
- Simlops miudo Ruiz, 2014 — Brazil
- Simlops nadinae Ruiz, 2014 — Brazil
- Simlops pennai Bonaldo, 2014 (type) — Brazil
- Simlops platnicki Bonaldo, 2014 — Brazil
- Simlops similis Ott, 2014 — Brazil

=== Simonoonops ===
Simonoonops Harvey, 2002

- Simonoonops andersoni Platnick & Dupérré, 2011 — Venezuela
- Simonoonops chickeringi Platnick & Dupérré, 2011 — St. Vincent
- Simonoonops craneae (Chickering, 1968) (type) — Venezuela, Trinidad
- Simonoonops etang Platnick & Dupérré, 2011 — Grenada
- Simonoonops globina (Chickering, 1968) — Dominican Rep.
- Simonoonops grande Platnick & Dupérré, 2011 — Venezuela
- Simonoonops lutzi Platnick & Dupérré, 2011 — Guyana
- Simonoonops princeps (Simon, 1892) — St. Vincent
- Simonoonops simoni Platnick & Dupérré, 2011 — Venezuela
- Simonoonops soltina (Chickering, 1968) — St. Vincent
- Simonoonops spiniger Simon, 1892 — St. Vincent

=== Socotroonops ===
Socotroonops Saaristo & van Harten, 2002

- Socotroonops socotra Saaristo & van Harten, 2002 (type) — Yemen (Socotra)

=== Spinestis ===
Spinestis

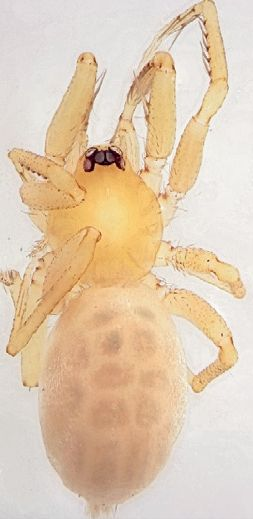
Spinestis nikita, female

Spinestis Saaristo & Marusik, 2009

- Spinestis nikita Saaristo & Marusik, 2009 (type) — Ukraine

=== Stenoonops ===
Stenoonops Simon, 1892

- Stenoonops alazan Platnick & Dupérré, 2010 — Mexico
- Stenoonops belmopan Platnick & Dupérré, 2010 — Belize
- Stenoonops bimini Platnick & Dupérré, 2010 — Bahama Is.
- Stenoonops brendae Platnick, Dupérré & Berniker, 2013 — Cuba
- Stenoonops cabo Platnick & Dupérré, 2010 — Mexico
- Stenoonops canita Platnick & Dupérré, 2010 — Panama
- Stenoonops dimotus Chickering, 1969 — Jamaica
- Stenoonops egenulus Simon, 1893 — Venezuela
- Stenoonops exgord Platnick & Dupérré, 2010 — Virgin Is.
- Stenoonops insolitus Chickering, 1969 — Jamaica
- Stenoonops jara Platnick & Dupérré, 2010 — Hispaniola
- Stenoonops kochalkai Platnick & Dupérré, 2010 — Colombia
- Stenoonops luquillo Platnick & Dupérré, 2010 — Puerto Rico
- Stenoonops macabus Chickering, 1969 — Jamaica
- Stenoonops mandeville Platnick & Dupérré, 2010 — Jamaica
- Stenoonops murphyorum Platnick & Dupérré, 2010 — Costa Rica
- Stenoonops opisthornatus Benoit, 1979 — Seychelles
- Stenoonops peckorum Platnick & Dupérré, 2010 — USA
- Stenoonops petrunkevitchi Chickering, 1951 — Costa Rica, Panama
- Stenoonops pretiosus (Bryant, 1942) — Virgin Is.
- Stenoonops saba Platnick & Dupérré, 2010 — Saba
- Stenoonops saintjohn Platnick & Dupérré, 2010 — Virgin Is.
- Stenoonops scabriculus Simon, 1892 (type) — Guadeloupe, St. Vincent, Venezuela
- Stenoonops schuhi Platnick, Dupérré & Berniker, 2013 — Cuba
- Stenoonops simla Platnick & Dupérré, 2010 — Trinidad
- Stenoonops tayrona Platnick & Dupérré, 2010 — Colombia, Venezuela
- Stenoonops tobyi Platnick, Dupérré & Berniker, 2013 — Cuba
- Stenoonops tortola Platnick & Dupérré, 2010 — Virgin Is.

=== Sulsula ===
Sulsula Simon, 1882

- Sulsula pauper (O. Pickard-Cambridge, 1876) (type) — Algeria, Egypt, Sudan

== T ==
=== Tapinesthis ===
Tapinesthis

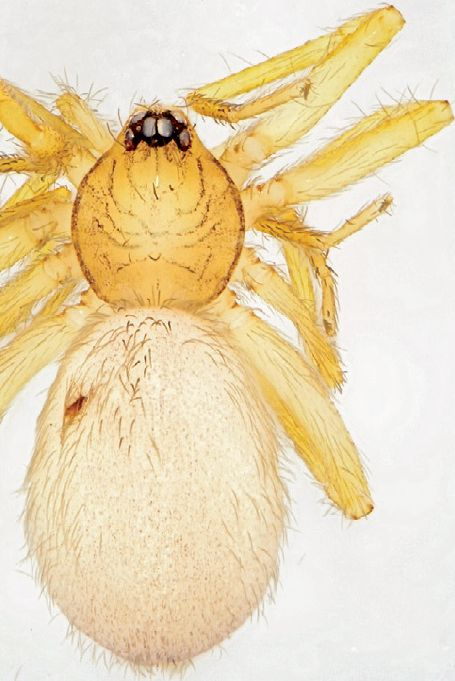
Tapinesthis inermis, female

Tapinesthis Simon, 1914

- Tapinesthis inermis (Simon, 1882) (type) — Europe

=== Telchius ===
Telchius Simon, 1893

- Telchius barbarus Simon, 1893 (type) — Algeria
- Telchius maculosus Denis, 1952 — Morocco
- Telchius transvaalicus Simon, 1907 — South Africa

=== Termitoonops ===
Termitoonops Benoit, 1964

- Termitoonops apicarquieri Benoit, 1975 — Congo
- Termitoonops bouilloni Benoit, 1964 (type) — Congo
- Termitoonops faini Benoit, 1964 — Congo
- Termitoonops furculitermitis Benoit, 1975 — Congo
- Termitoonops spinosissimus Benoit, 1964 — Congo

=== Tinadysderina ===
Tinadysderina Platnick, Berniker & Bonaldo, 2013

- Tinadysderina bremen Platnick, Berniker & Bonaldo, 2013 — Colombia
- Tinadysderina gorgona Platnick, Berniker & Bonaldo, 2013 — Colombia
- Tinadysderina otonga Platnick, Berniker & Bonaldo, 2013 — Ecuador
- Tinadysderina pereira Platnick, Berniker & Bonaldo, 2013 — Colombia
- Tinadysderina planada Platnick, Berniker & Bonaldo, 2013 — Colombia
- Tinadysderina tinalandia Platnick, Berniker & Bonaldo, 2013 (type) — Ecuador

=== Tolegnaro ===
Tolegnaro Álvarez-Padilla, Ubick & Griswold, 2012

- Tolegnaro kepleri Álvarez-Padilla, Ubick & Griswold, 2012 — Madagascar
- Tolegnaro sagani Álvarez-Padilla, Ubick & Griswold, 2012 — Madagascar

=== Toloonops ===
Toloonops Bolzern, Platnick & Berniker, 2015

- Toloonops belmo Bolzern, Platnick & Berniker, 2015 — Belize
- Toloonops chiapa Bolzern, Platnick & Berniker, 2015 (type) — Mexico
- Toloonops chickeringi (Brignoli, 1974) — Mexico
- Toloonops jacala Bolzern, Platnick & Berniker, 2015 — Mexico
- Toloonops tolucanus (Gertsch & Davis, 1942) — Mexico
- Toloonops veracruz Bolzern, Platnick & Berniker, 2015 — Mexico
- Toloonops verapaz Bolzern, Platnick & Berniker, 2015 — Guatemala

=== Triaeris ===
Triaeris

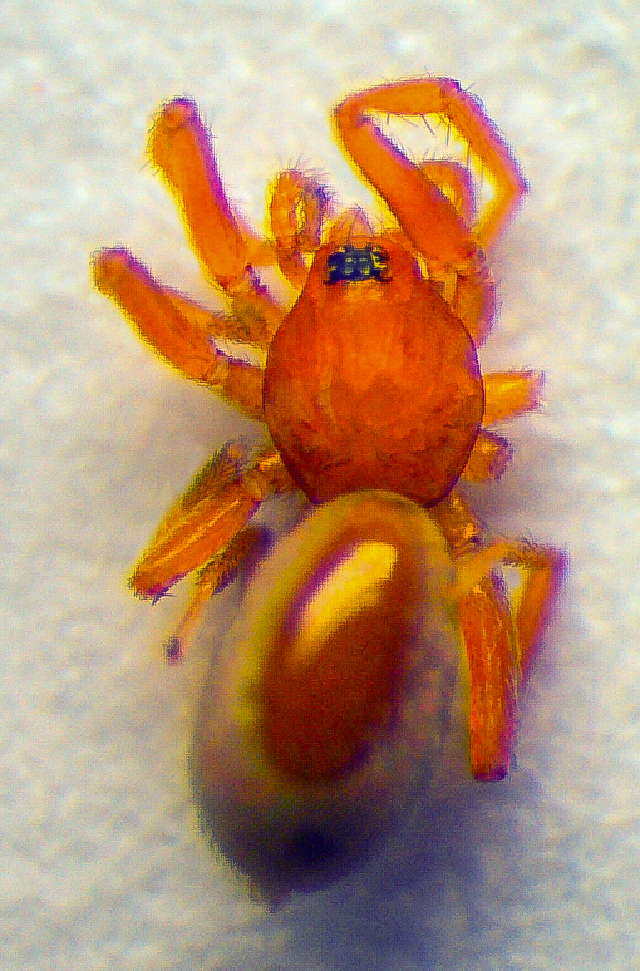
Triaeris stenaspis

Triaeris Simon, 1892

- Triaeris barela Gajbe, 2004 — India
- Triaeris equestris Simon, 1907 — São Tomé and Príncipe
- Triaeris fako Platnick, Dupérré, Ubick & Fannes, 2012 — Cameroon
- Triaeris ibadan Platnick, Dupérré, Ubick & Fannes, 2012 — Nigeria
- Triaeris khashiensis Tikader, 1966 — India
- Triaeris macrophthalmus Berland, 1914 — Kenya
  - Triaeris macrophthalmus cryptops Berland, 1914 — Kenya, Zanzibar
  - Triaeris macrophthalmus medius Berland, 1914 — Kenya
- Triaeris manii Tikader & Malhotra, 1974 — India
- Triaeris melghaticus Bastawade, 2005 — India
- Triaeris menchum Platnick, Dupérré, Ubick & Fannes, 2012 — Cameroon
- Triaeris moca Platnick, Dupérré, Ubick & Fannes, 2012 — Equatorial Guinea (Bioko)
- Triaeris nagarensis Tikader & Malhotra, 1974 — India
- Triaeris nagpurensis Tikader & Malhotra, 1974 — India
- Triaeris oku Platnick, Dupérré, Ubick & Fannes, 2012 — Cameroon
- Triaeris poonaensis Tikader & Malhotra, 1974 — India
- Triaeris stenaspis Simon, 1892 (type) — Africa. Introduced to North, Central, South America, Caribbean, Europe, Iran, Taiwan, Australia, Pacific Is.
- Triaeris togo Platnick, Dupérré, Ubick & Fannes, 2012 — Togo

=== Tridysderina ===
Tridysderina Platnick, Berniker & Bonaldo, 2013

- Tridysderina archidona Platnick, Berniker & Bonaldo, 2013 — Ecuador
- Tridysderina bellavista Platnick, Berniker & Bonaldo, 2013 — Ecuador
- Tridysderina galeras Platnick, Berniker & Bonaldo, 2013 — Ecuador
- Tridysderina jatun Platnick, Berniker & Bonaldo, 2013 — Ecuador
- Tridysderina tena Platnick, Berniker & Bonaldo, 2013 — Ecuador
- Tridysderina yasuni Platnick, Berniker & Bonaldo, 2013 (type) — Ecuador

=== Trilacuna ===
Trilacuna Tong & Li, 2007

- Trilacuna aenobarba (Brignoli, 1978) — Bhutan
- Trilacuna alces Eichenberger, 2011 — Thailand
- Trilacuna angularis Tong & Li, 2007 — China
- Trilacuna bangla Grismado & Ramírez, 2014 — India, Nepal
- Trilacuna bawan Tong, Zhang & Li, 2019 — China
- Trilacuna besucheti Grismado & Piacentini, 2014 — India
- Trilacuna bilingua Eichenberger, 2011 — Malaysia
- Trilacuna clarissa Eichenberger, 2011 — Indonesia (Sumatra)
- Trilacuna datang Tong, Zhang & Li, 2019 — China
- Trilacuna diabolica Kranz-Baltensperger, 2011 — Thailand
- Trilacuna fugong Tong, Zhang & Li, 2019 — China
- Trilacuna gongshan Tong, Zhang & Li, 2019 — China
- Trilacuna hamata Tong & Li, 2013 — Vietnam
- Trilacuna hansanensis Seo, 2017 — Korea
- Trilacuna hazara Grismado & Ramírez, 2014 — Pakistan
- Trilacuna kropfi Eichenberger, 2011 — Thailand
- Trilacuna loebli Grismado & Piacentini, 2014 — India
- Trilacuna longling Tong, Zhang & Li, 2019 — China
- Trilacuna mahanadi Grismado & Piacentini, 2014 — India
- Trilacuna meghalaya Grismado & Piacentini, 2014 — India
- Trilacuna merapi Kranz-Baltensperger & Eichenberger, 2011 — Indonesia (Sumatra)
- Trilacuna qarzi Malek Hosseini & Grismado, 2015 — Iran
- Trilacuna rastrum Tong & Li, 2007 (type) — China
- Trilacuna simianshan Tong & Li, 2018 — China
- Trilacuna sinuosa Tong & Li, 2013 — Vietnam
- Trilacuna songyuae Tong & Li, 2018 — China
- Trilacuna werni Eichenberger, 2011 — Thailand
- Trilacuna wuhe Tong, Zhang & Li, 2019 — China
- Trilacuna xinping Tong, Zhang & Li, 2019 — China

== U ==
=== Unicorn ===
Unicorn Platnick & Brescovit, 1995

- Unicorn argentina (Mello-Leitão, 1940) — Argentina
- Unicorn catleyi Platnick & Brescovit, 1995 (type) — Chile, Argentina
- Unicorn chacabuco Platnick & Brescovit, 1995 — Chile
- Unicorn huanaco Platnick & Brescovit, 1995 — Bolivia
- Unicorn sikus González, Corronca & Cava, 2010 — Argentina
- Unicorn socos Platnick & Brescovit, 1995 — Chile
- Unicorn toconao Platnick & Brescovit, 1995 — Chile

== V ==
=== Varioonops ===
Varioonops Bolzern & Platnick, 2013

- Varioonops cafista Bolzern & Platnick, 2013 (type) — Costa Rica
- Varioonops cerrado Bolzern & Platnick, 2013 — Panama
- Varioonops chordio Bolzern & Platnick, 2013 — Venezuela
- Varioonops edvardi Bolzern & Platnick, 2013 — Colombia
- Varioonops funator Bolzern & Platnick, 2013 — Panama
- Varioonops girven Bolzern & Platnick, 2013 — Costa Rica
- Varioonops grancho Bolzern & Platnick, 2013 — Venezuela
- Varioonops heredia Bolzern & Platnick, 2013 — Costa Rica
- Varioonops montesta Bolzern & Platnick, 2013 — Costa Rica
- Varioonops parlata Bolzern & Platnick, 2013 — Venezuela
- Varioonops pittieri Bolzern & Platnick, 2013 — Venezuela
- Varioonops poas Bolzern & Platnick, 2013 — Costa Rica
- Varioonops potaguo Bolzern & Platnick, 2013 — Venezuela
- Varioonops ramila Bolzern & Platnick, 2013 — Costa Rica, Panama
- Varioonops sansidro Bolzern & Platnick, 2013 — Costa Rica, Panama
- Varioonops sinesama Bolzern & Platnick, 2013 — Colombia
- Varioonops spatharum Bolzern & Platnick, 2013 — Costa Rica
- Varioonops tortuguero Bolzern & Platnick, 2013 — Costa Rica
- Varioonops trujillo Bolzern & Platnick, 2013 — Venezuela
- Varioonops varablanca Bolzern & Platnick, 2013 — Costa Rica
- Varioonops velsala Bolzern & Platnick, 2013 — Costa Rica
- Varioonops veragua Bolzern & Platnick, 2013 — Costa Rica
- Varioonops yacambu Bolzern & Platnick, 2013 — Venezuela

=== Vientianea ===
Vientianea Tong & Li, 2013

- Vientianea peterjaegeri Tong & Li, 2013 (type) — Laos

=== Volborattella ===
Volborattella Saucedo & Ubick, 2015

- Volborattella guenevera Saucedo, Ubick & Griswold, 2015 — Madagascar
- Volborattella nasario Saucedo, Ubick & Griswold, 2015 — Madagascar
- Volborattella paulyi Saucedo, Ubick & Griswold, 2015 — Madagascar
- Volborattella teresae Saucedo, Ubick & Griswold, 2015 (type) — Madagascar
- Volborattella toliara Saucedo, Ubick & Griswold, 2015 — Madagascar

== W ==
=== Wanops ===
Wanops Chamberlin & Ivie, 1938

- Wanops coecus Chamberlin & Ivie, 1938 (type) — Mexico

== X ==
=== Xestaspis ===
Xestaspis

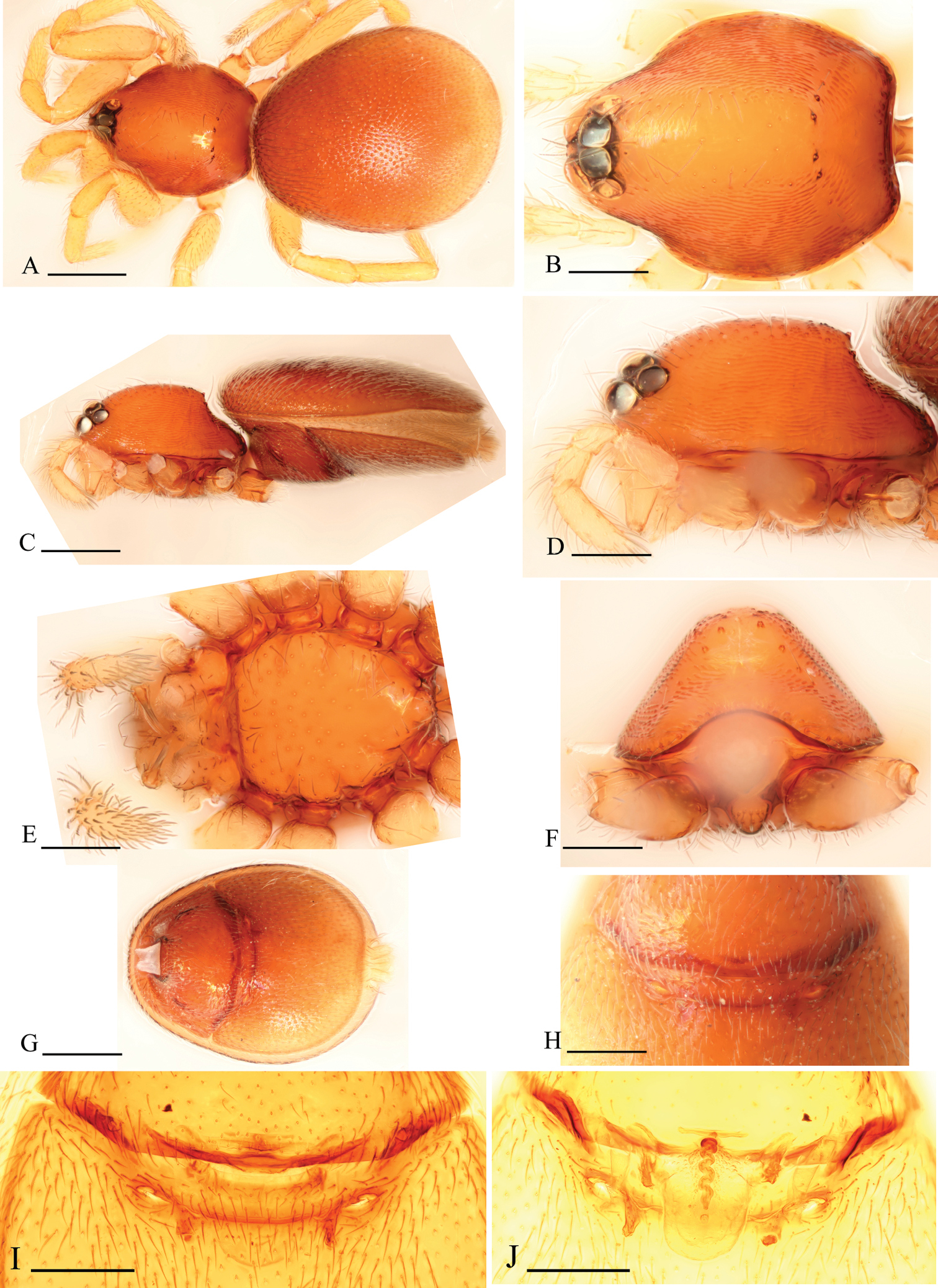
Xestaspis shoushanensis, female

Xestaspis Simon, 1884

- Xestaspis biflocci Eichenberger, 2012 — Thailand
- Xestaspis kandy Eichenberger, 2012 — Sri Lanka
- Xestaspis linnaei Ott & Harvey, 2008 — Australia (Western Australia)
- Xestaspis loricata (L. Koch, 1873) (type) — China, Taiwan, Laos, Australia, Micronesia, French Polynesia
- Xestaspis nitida Simon, 1884 — Algeria, Yemen
- Xestaspis nuwaraeliya Ranasinghe & Benjamin, 2016 — Sri Lanka
- Xestaspis padaviya Ranasinghe & Benjamin, 2016 — Sri Lanka
- Xestaspis parmata (Thorell, 1890) — Myanmar, Indonesia (Sumatra, Java, Lombok). Introduced to USA to Panama, Caribbean, Venezuela, Brazil, Madeira, Equatorial Guinea (Bioko), São Tomé and Príncipe, St. Helena, Mauritius, Seychelles, Yemen
- Xestaspis paulina Eichenberger, 2012 — Sri Lanka
- Xestaspis pophami Ranasinghe & Benjamin, 2016 — Sri Lanka
- Xestaspis recurva Strand, 1906 — Ethiopia
- Xestaspis rostrata Tong & Li, 2009 — China
- Xestaspis semengoh Eichenberger, 2012 — Borneo
- Xestaspis sertata Simon, 1907 — Equatorial Guinea (Bioko)
- Xestaspis shoushanensis Tong & Li, 2014 — Taiwan
- Xestaspis sis Saaristo & van Harten, 2006 — Yemen
- Xestaspis sublaevis Simon, 1893 — Sri Lanka
- Xestaspis tumidula Simon, 1893 — Sierra Leone
- Xestaspis yemeni Saaristo & van Harten, 2006 — Yemen

=== Xiombarg ===
Xiombarg Brignoli, 1979

- Xiombarg plaumanni Brignoli, 1979 (type) — Brazil, Argentina

=== Xyccarph ===
Xyccarph Brignoli, 1978

- Xyccarph migrans Höfer & Brescovit, 1996 — Brazil
- Xyccarph myops Brignoli, 1978 (type) — Brazil
- Xyccarph tenuis (Vellard, 1924) — Brazil
- Xyccarph wellingtoni Höfer & Brescovit, 1996 — Brazil

=== Xyphinus ===
Xyphinus

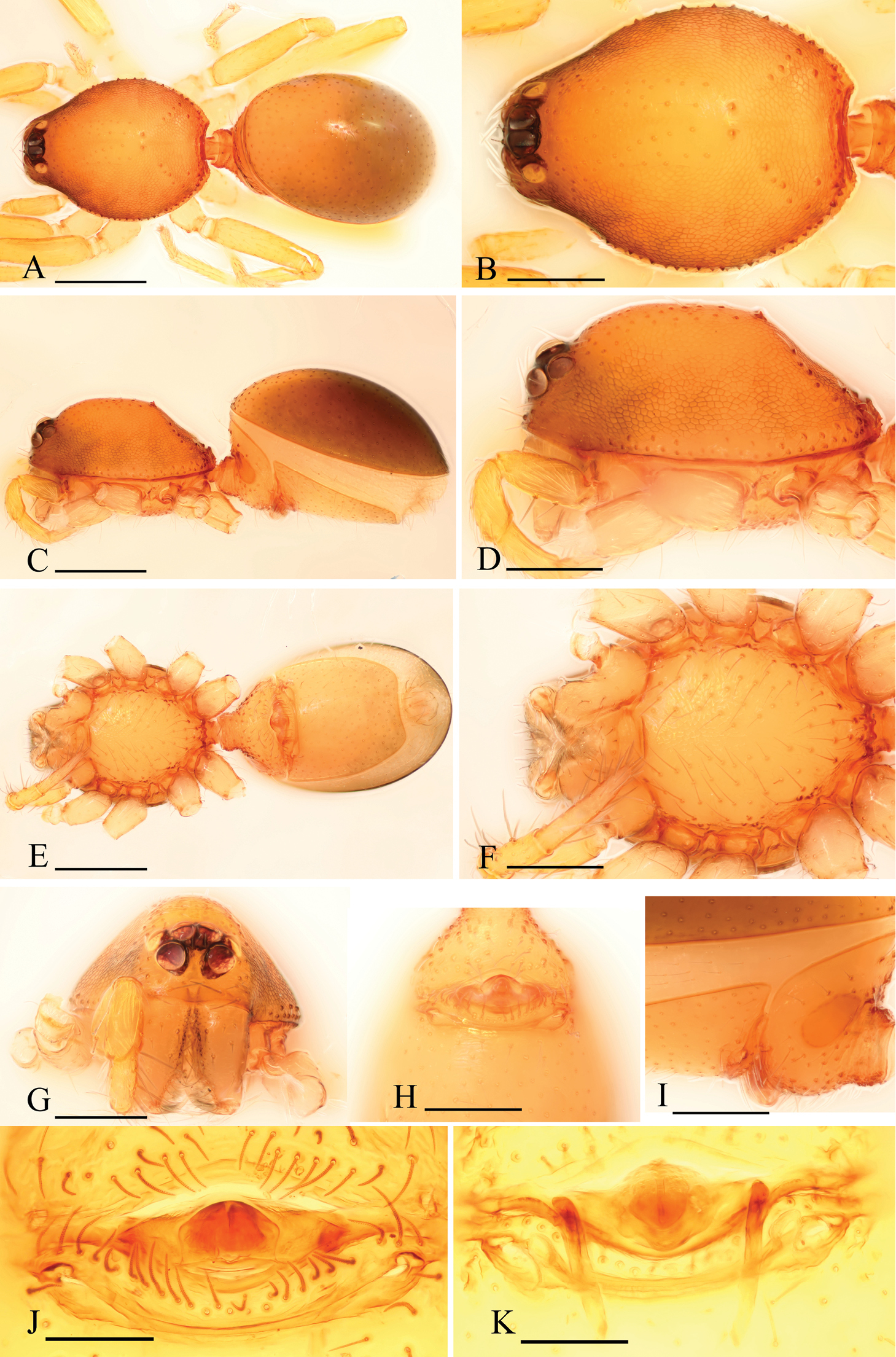
Xyphinus hwangi, female

Xyphinus Simon, 1893

- Xyphinus abanghamidi Deeleman-Reinhold, 1987 — Borneo
- Xyphinus acutus Kranz-Baltensperger, 2014 — Borneo
- Xyphinus baehrae Kranz-Baltensperger, 2014 — India to Australia
- Xyphinus deelemanae Kranz-Baltensperger, 2014 — Borneo
- Xyphinus distortus Kranz-Baltensperger, 2014 — Thailand, Malaysia
- Xyphinus gibber Deeleman-Reinhold, 1987 — Borneo
- Xyphinus holgeri Kranz-Baltensperger, 2014 — Thailand, Laos, Malaysia, Indonesia (Borneo), Brunei
- Xyphinus hwangi Tong & Li, 2014 — Taiwan
- Xyphinus hystrix Simon, 1893 (type) — Malaysia, Singapore
- Xyphinus infaustus Kranz-Baltensperger, 2014 — Indonesia (Sumatra)
- Xyphinus karschi (Bösenberg & Strand, 1906) — China, Thailand, Taiwan, Japan
- Xyphinus krabi Kranz-Baltensperger, 2014 — Thailand
- Xyphinus lemniscatus Deeleman-Reinhold, 1987 — Borneo
- Xyphinus montanus Deeleman-Reinhold, 1987 — Borneo
- Xyphinus pachara Kranz-Baltensperger, 2014 — Malaysia
- Xyphinus pakse Tong & Li, 2013 — Laos
- Xyphinus rogerfedereri Kranz-Baltensperger, 2014 — Malaysia, Thailand
- Xyphinus sabal Kranz-Baltensperger, 2014 — Borneo
- Xyphinus xanthus Deeleman-Reinhold, 1987 — Borneo
- Xyphinus xelo Deeleman-Reinhold, 1987 — Malaysia

== Y ==
=== Yumates ===
Yumates Chamberlin, 1924

- Yumates angela Chamberlin, 1924 — Mexico
- Yumates nesophila Chamberlin, 1924 (type) — Mexico

== Z ==
=== Zyngoonops ===
Zyngoonops Benoit, 1977

- Zyngoonops beatriceae Fannes, 2013 — Congo
- Zyngoonops chambersi Fannes, 2013 — Congo
- Zyngoonops clandestinus Benoit, 1977 (type) — Congo
- Zyngoonops goedaerti Fannes, 2013 — Congo
- Zyngoonops marki Fannes, 2013 — Congo
- Zyngoonops moffetti Fannes, 2013 — Congo
- Zyngoonops redii Fannes, 2013 — Congo
- Zyngoonops rockoxi Fannes, 2013 — Congo
- Zyngoonops swammerdami Fannes, 2013 — Congo
- Zyngoonops walcotti Fannes, 2013 — Central African Rep.
