= Hytanis =

Scientific classification
- Kingdom: Animalia
- Phylum: Arthropoda
- Subphylum: Chelicerata
- Class: Arachnida
- Order: Araneae
- Infraorder: Araneomorphae
- Family: Oonopidae
- Genus: Hytanis
- Species: H. oblonga

Binomial name
- Hytanis oblonga Simon, 1893

Genus of spiders

Hytanis is a genus of spiders in the family Oonopidae. It was first described in 1893 by Simon. As of 2017, it contains only one species, Hytanis oblonga, found in Venezuela.
