= Diblemma =

Diblemma may refer to:

- Diblemma (plant), a fern genus in the sub family Microsoroideae
- Diblemma (spider), a spider genus in the family Oonopidae
