= Kijabe (spider) =

Scientific classification
- Domain: Eukaryota
- Kingdom: Animalia
- Phylum: Arthropoda
- Subphylum: Chelicerata
- Class: Arachnida
- Order: Araneae
- Infraorder: Araneomorphae
- Family: Oonopidae
- Genus: Kijabe; Berland, 1914

Type species
- K. paradoxa Berland, 1914

Species
- K. ensifera Caporiacco, 1949 — Kenya; K. paradoxa Berland, 1914 — East Africa

Genus of spiders

Kijabe is a genus of African goblin spiders first described by Lucien Berland in 1914. As of April 2019 it contains only two species.
