= Trilacuna =

Scientific classification
- Domain: Eukaryota
- Kingdom: Animalia
- Phylum: Arthropoda
- Subphylum: Chelicerata
- Class: Arachnida
- Order: Araneae
- Infraorder: Araneomorphae
- Family: Oonopidae
- Genus: Trilacuna; Tong & Li, 2007

Species
- See text

Genus of spiders

Trilacuna is a genus of goblin spiders native to Southeast Asia, first described by Tong & Li in 2007. They look similar to members of Silhouettella, but males can be distinguished by their large palpal femur, among several other more complicated defining features. The name is a combination of the Latin terms "tri" and "lacuna", referring to the three-branched endites in males and the three-notched labium in females.

== Species ==
As of February 2019, it contains 29 species.

- Trilacuna aenobarba (Brignoli, 1978) — Bhutan
- Trilacuna alces Eichenberger, 2011 — Thailand
- Trilacuna angularis Tong & Li, 2007 — China
- Trilacuna bangla Grismado & Ramírez, 2014 — India, Nepal
- Trilacuna bawan Tong, Zhang & Li, 2019 — China
- Trilacuna besucheti Grismado & Piacentini, 2014 — China
- Trilacuna bilingua Eichenberger, 2011 — Malaysia
- Trilacuna clarissa Eichenberger, 2011 — Sumatra
- Trilacuna datang Tong, Zhang & Li, 2019 — China
- Trilacuna diabolica Kranz-Baltensperger, 2011 — Thailand
- Trilacuna fugong Tong, Zhang & Li, 2019 — China
- Trilacuna gongshan Tong, Zhang & Li, 2019 — China
- Trilacuna hamata Tong & Li, 2013 — Vietnam
- Trilacuna hansanensis Seo, 2017 — Korea
- Trilacuna hazaraGrismado & Ramírez, 2014 — Pakistan
- Trilacuna kropfi Eichenberger, 2011 — Thailand
- Trilacuna loebli Grismado & Piacentini, 2014 — India
- Trilacuna longling Tong, Zhang & Li, 2019 — China
- Trilacuna mahanadi Grismado & Piacentini, 2014 — India
- Trilacuna meghalaya Grismado & Piacentini, 2014 — India
- Trilacuna merapi Kranz-Baltensperger & Eichenberger, 2011 — Sumatra
- Trilacuna qarzi Malek Hosseini & Grismado, 2015 — Iran
- Trilacuna rastrum Tong & Li, 2007 — China
- Trilacuna simianshan Tong & Li, 2018 — China
- Trilacuna sinuosa Tong & Li, 2013 — Vietnam
- Trilacuna songyuae Tong & Li, 2018 — China
- Trilacuna werni Eichenberger, 2011 — Thailand
- Trilacuna wuhe Tong, Zhang & Li, 2019 — China
- Trilacuna xinping Tong, Zhang & Li, 2019 — China

== See also ==
- Spiders of Asia
- Fauna of Southeast Asia
