= Guaraguaoonops =

Scientific classification
- Domain: Eukaryota
- Kingdom: Animalia
- Phylum: Arthropoda
- Subphylum: Chelicerata
- Class: Arachnida
- Order: Araneae
- Infraorder: Araneomorphae
- Family: Oonopidae
- Genus: Guaraguaoonops; Bonaldo

Species
- Guaraguaoonops hemhem Brescovit, Rheims & Bonaldo, 2012; Guaraguaoonops humbom Brescovit, Rheims & Bonaldo, 2012

Genus of spiders

Guaraguaoonops is a genus of spiders in the family Oonopidae. It was first described in 2012 by Brescovit, Rheims & Bonaldo. As of 2016, it contains 2 species, both from Brazil.
