= Ponsoonops =

Scientific classification
- Domain: Eukaryota
- Kingdom: Animalia
- Phylum: Arthropoda
- Subphylum: Chelicerata
- Class: Arachnida
- Order: Araneae
- Infraorder: Araneomorphae
- Family: Oonopidae
- Genus: Ponsoonops; Bolzern

Type species
- Ponsoonops sanvito

Species
- 22, see text

Genus of spiders

Ponsoonops is a genus of spiders in the family Oonopidae. It was first described in 2014 by Bolzern. As of 2017, it contains 22 species.

== Species ==
Ponsoonops comprises the following species:

- Ponsoonops bilzae Bolzern, 2014
- Ponsoonops bollo Bolzern, 2014
- Ponsoonops boquete Bolzern, 2014
- Ponsoonops coiba Bolzern, 2014
- Ponsoonops duenas Bolzern, 2014
- Ponsoonops fanselix Bolzern, 2014
- Ponsoonops frio Bolzern, 2014
- Ponsoonops hamus Bolzern, 2014
- Ponsoonops lavega Bolzern, 2014
- Ponsoonops lerida Bolzern, 2014
- Ponsoonops lucha Bolzern, 2014
- Ponsoonops micans (Simon, 1893)
- Ponsoonops mirante Bolzern, 2014
- Ponsoonops pansedro Bolzern, 2014
- Ponsoonops panto Bolzern, 2014
- Ponsoonops salimsa Bolzern, 2014
- Ponsoonops samadam Bolzern, 2014
- Ponsoonops sanvito Bolzern, 2014
- Ponsoonops tacana Bolzern, 2014
- Ponsoonops viejo Bolzern, 2014
- Ponsoonops vuena Bolzern, 2014
- Ponsoonops yumuri Bolzern, 2014
