= Dysderina =

Scientific classification
- Kingdom: Animalia
- Phylum: Arthropoda
- Subphylum: Chelicerata
- Class: Arachnida
- Order: Araneae
- Infraorder: Araneomorphae
- Family: Oonopidae
- Genus: Dysderina; Simon, 1891

Genus of spiders

Dysderina is a genus of goblin spider. Its members are found in South America, Africa and the Philippines.

The majority of species was described by Norman I. Platnick et al. in 2013.

== Species ==
As of October 2025, this genus includes 24 species:

- Dysderina amaca Platnick, Berniker & Bonaldo, 2013 – Colombia
- Dysderina ayo Platnick, Berniker & Bonaldo, 2013 – Colombia
- Dysderina baehrae Platnick, Berniker & Bonaldo, 2013 – Ecuador
- Dysderina bimucronata Simon, 1893 – Philippines
- Dysderina capensis Simon, 1907 – South Africa
- Dysderina craigi Platnick, Berniker & Bonaldo, 2013 – Colombia
- Dysderina cunday Platnick, Berniker & Bonaldo, 2013 – Colombia
- Dysderina erwini Platnick, Berniker & Bonaldo, 2013 – Ecuador
- Dysderina excavata Platnick, Berniker & Bonaldo, 2013 – Ecuador
- Dysderina granulosa Simon & Fage, 1922 – East Africa
- Dysderina insularum Roewer, 1963 – Caroline Islands
- Dysderina machinator (Keyserling, 1881) – Peru
- Dysderina matamata Platnick, Berniker & Bonaldo, 2013 – Colombia
- Dysderina perarmata Fage & Simon, 1936 – Kenya
- Dysderina principalis (Keyserling, 1881) – Colombia (type species)
- Dysderina purpurea Simon, 1893 – Philippines
- Dysderina sacha Platnick, Berniker & Bonaldo, 2013 – Ecuador
- Dysderina sasaima Platnick, Berniker & Bonaldo, 2013 – Colombia
- Dysderina scutata (O. Pickard-Cambridge, 1876) – Egypt
- Dysderina speculifera Simon, 1907 – South Africa, Mozambique
- Dysderina straba Fage, 1936 – Kenya
- Dysderina sublaevis Simon, 1907 – Algeria
- Dysderina tiputini Platnick, Berniker & Bonaldo, 2013 – Ecuador
- Dysderina urucu Platnick, Berniker & Bonaldo, 2013 – Brazil
