= Telchius =

Scientific classification
- Kingdom: Animalia
- Phylum: Arthropoda
- Subphylum: Chelicerata
- Class: Arachnida
- Order: Araneae
- Infraorder: Araneomorphae
- Family: Oonopidae
- Genus: Telchius; Simon

Species
- T. barbarus Simon, 1893; T. maculosus Denis, 1952; T. transvaalicus Simon, 1907

Genus of spiders

Telchius is an African genus of spiders in the family Oonopidae with three described species. It was first described in 1893 by Simon

== Species ==
As of October 2025, this genus includes three species:

- Telchius barbarus Simon, 1893 – Algeria (type species)
- Telchius maculosus Denis, 1952 – Morocco
- Telchius transvaalicus Simon, 1907 – South Africa
