= Paramolotra =

Scientific classification
- Kingdom: Animalia
- Phylum: Arthropoda
- Subphylum: Chelicerata
- Class: Arachnida
- Order: Araneae
- Infraorder: Araneomorphae
- Family: Oonopidae
- Genus: Paramolotra; Tong & Li, 2021

Type species
- P. pome Tong & Li, 2021

Species
- Paramolotra metok Tong & Li, 2021; Paramolotra pome Tong & Li, 2021

Genus of spiders

Paramolotra is a small genus of east Asian goblin spiders. It was first described by W. H. Cheng, D. J. Bian and Y. F. Tong in 2021, and it has only been found in China. As of February 2022 it contains only two species: P. metok and P. pome.
