= Aposphragisma =

Scientific classification
- Domain: Eukaryota
- Kingdom: Animalia
- Phylum: Arthropoda
- Subphylum: Chelicerata
- Class: Arachnida
- Order: Araneae
- Infraorder: Araneomorphae
- Family: Oonopidae
- Genus: Aposphragisma; Thoma

Type species
- Aposphragisma helvetiorum

Species
- 19, see text

Genus of spiders

Aposphragisma is a genus of spiders in the family Oonopidae. It was first described in 2014 by Thoma. As of 2017, it contains 19 species, most found in Malaysia, Borneo, and other Asian nations.

== Species ==
Aposphragisma comprises the following species:

- Aposphragisma baltenspergerae Thoma, 2014
- Aposphragisma borgulai Thoma, 2014
- Aposphragisma brunomanseri Thoma, 2014
- Aposphragisma confluens Thoma, 2014
- Aposphragisma dayak Thoma, 2014
- Aposphragisma dentatum Thoma, 2014
- Aposphragisma draconigenum Thoma, 2014
- Aposphragisma hausammannae Thoma, 2014
- Aposphragisma helvetiorum Thoma, 2014
- Aposphragisma kolleri Thoma, 2014
- Aposphragisma menzi Thoma, 2014
- Aposphragisma monoceros Thoma, 2014
- Aposphragisma nocturnum Thoma, 2014
- Aposphragisma retifer Thoma, 2014
- Aposphragisma rimba Thoma, 2014
- Aposphragisma salewskii Thoma, 2014
- Aposphragisma scimitar Thoma, 2014
- Aposphragisma sepilok Thoma, 2014
- Aposphragisma stannum Thoma, 2014
