= Wanops =

Scientific classification
- Kingdom: Animalia
- Phylum: Arthropoda
- Subphylum: Chelicerata
- Class: Arachnida
- Order: Araneae
- Infraorder: Araneomorphae
- Family: Oonopidae
- Genus: Wanops; Chamberlin & Ivie, 1938
- Species: W. coecus

Binomial name
- Wanops coecus Chamberlin & Ivie, 1938

Genus of spiders

Wanops is a monotypic genus of Mexican goblin spiders containing the single species, Wanops coecus. It was first described by Ralph Vary Chamberlin & Vaine Wilton Ivie in 1938, and is only found in Mexico.
