= Bipoonops =

Scientific classification
- Domain: Eukaryota
- Kingdom: Animalia
- Phylum: Arthropoda
- Subphylum: Chelicerata
- Class: Arachnida
- Order: Araneae
- Infraorder: Araneomorphae
- Family: Oonopidae
- Genus: Bipoonops; Bolzern

Species
- Bipoonops baobab Bolzern, 2014; Bipoonops pucuna Bolzern, 2014; Bipoonops tsachila Bolzern, 2014

Genus of spiders

Bipoonops is a genus of spiders in the family Oonopidae. It was first described in 2014 by Bolzern. As of 2016, it contains 3 species, all from Ecuador.
