= Semibulbus =

Scientific classification
- Kingdom: Animalia
- Phylum: Arthropoda
- Subphylum: Chelicerata
- Class: Arachnida
- Order: Araneae
- Infraorder: Araneomorphae
- Family: Oonopidae
- Genus: Semibulbus
- Species: S. zekharya

Binomial name
- Semibulbus zekharya Saaristo, 2007

Genus of spiders

Semibulbus is a genus of spiders in the family Oonopidae. It was first described in 2007 by Saaristo. As of 2017, it contains only one species, Semibulbus zekharya.
