= Scaphiella =

Scientific classification
- Kingdom: Animalia
- Phylum: Arthropoda
- Subphylum: Chelicerata
- Class: Arachnida
- Order: Araneae
- Infraorder: Araneomorphae
- Family: Oonopidae
- Genus: Scaphiella; Simon

Type species
- Scaphiella cymbalaria

Species
- 62, see text

Genus of spiders

Scaphiella is a genus of spiders in the family Oonopidae. It was first described in 1892 by Simon. As of 2017, it contains 62 species.

== Species ==
Scaphiella comprises the following species:

- Scaphiella agocena Chickering, 1968
- Scaphiella almirante Platnick & Dupérré, 2010
- Scaphiella altamira Platnick & Dupérré, 2010
- Scaphiella antonio Platnick & Dupérré, 2010
- Scaphiella arima Platnick & Dupérré, 2010
- Scaphiella ayacucho Platnick & Dupérré, 2010
- Scaphiella barroana Gertsch, 1941
- Scaphiella bocas Platnick & Dupérré, 2010
- Scaphiella bonda Platnick & Dupérré, 2010
- Scaphiella bopal Platnick & Dupérré, 2010
- Scaphiella bordoni Dumitrescu & Georgescu, 1987
- Scaphiella bryantae Dumitrescu & Georgescu, 1983
- Scaphiella buck Platnick & Dupérré, 2010
- Scaphiella campeche Platnick & Dupérré, 2010
- Scaphiella capim Platnick & Dupérré, 2010
- Scaphiella cata Platnick & Dupérré, 2010
- Scaphiella cayo Platnick & Dupérré, 2010
- Scaphiella ceiba Platnick & Dupérré, 2010
- Scaphiella chone Platnick & Dupérré, 2010
- Scaphiella cocona Platnick & Dupérré, 2010
- Scaphiella curlena Chickering, 1968
- Scaphiella cymbalaria Simon, 1892
- Scaphiella etang Platnick & Dupérré, 2010
- Scaphiella gracia Platnick & Dupérré, 2010
- Scaphiella guatopo Platnick & Dupérré, 2010
- Scaphiella guiria Platnick & Dupérré, 2010
- Scaphiella hitoy Platnick & Dupérré, 2010
- Scaphiella hone Platnick & Dupérré, 2010
- Scaphiella icabaru Platnick & Dupérré, 2010
- Scaphiella incha Platnick & Dupérré, 2010
- Scaphiella irmaos Platnick & Dupérré, 2010
- Scaphiella kalunda Chickering, 1968
- Scaphiella kartabo Platnick & Dupérré, 2010
- Scaphiella lancetilla Platnick & Dupérré, 2010
- Scaphiella longkey Platnick & Dupérré, 2010
- Scaphiella maculata Birabén, 1955
- Scaphiella manaus Platnick & Dupérré, 2010
- Scaphiella meta Platnick & Dupérré, 2010
- Scaphiella mico Platnick & Dupérré, 2010
- Scaphiella miranda Platnick & Dupérré, 2010
- Scaphiella muralla Platnick & Dupérré, 2010
- Scaphiella murici Platnick & Dupérré, 2010
- Scaphiella napo Platnick & Dupérré, 2010
- Scaphiella osa Platnick & Dupérré, 2010
- Scaphiella pago Platnick & Dupérré, 2010
- Scaphiella palenque Platnick & Dupérré, 2010
- Scaphiella palmillas Platnick & Dupérré, 2010
- Scaphiella penna Platnick & Dupérré, 2010
- Scaphiella pich Platnick & Dupérré, 2010
- Scaphiella saba Platnick & Dupérré, 2010
- Scaphiella scutiventris Simon, 1893
- Scaphiella septella Chickering, 1968
- Scaphiella simla Chickering, 1968
- Scaphiella tena Platnick & Dupérré, 2010
- Scaphiella tigre Platnick & Dupérré, 2010
- Scaphiella tuxtla Platnick & Dupérré, 2010
- Scaphiella valencia Platnick & Dupérré, 2010
- Scaphiella vicencio Platnick & Dupérré, 2010
- Scaphiella virgen Platnick & Dupérré, 2010
- Scaphiella vito Platnick & Dupérré, 2010
- Scaphiella weberi Chickering, 1968
- Scaphiella williamsi Gertsch, 1941
