= Scaphios =

Scientific classification
- Domain: Eukaryota
- Kingdom: Animalia
- Phylum: Arthropoda
- Subphylum: Chelicerata
- Class: Arachnida
- Order: Araneae
- Infraorder: Araneomorphae
- Family: Oonopidae
- Genus: Scaphios; Dupérré

Type species
- Scaphios yanayacu

Species
- 8, see text

Genus of spiders

Scaphios is a genus of spiders in the family Oonopidae. It was first described in 2010 by Platnick & Dupérré. As of 2017, it contains 8 species, all found in Ecuador and Colombia.

== Species ==
Scaphios comprises the following species:

- Scaphios cayambe Platnick & Dupérré, 2010
- Scaphios jatun Platnick & Dupérré, 2010
- Scaphios napo Platnick & Dupérré, 2010
- Scaphios orellana Platnick & Dupérré, 2010
- Scaphios planada Platnick & Dupérré, 2010
- Scaphios puyo Platnick & Dupérré, 2010
- Scaphios wagra Platnick & Dupérré, 2010
- Scaphios yanayacu Platnick & Dupérré, 2010
