= Amazoonops =

Scientific classification
- Domain: Eukaryota
- Kingdom: Animalia
- Phylum: Arthropoda
- Subphylum: Chelicerata
- Class: Arachnida
- Order: Araneae
- Infraorder: Araneomorphae
- Family: Oonopidae
- Genus: Amazoonops; Bonaldo

Type species
- Amazoonops caxiuana

Species
- Amazoonops almeirim Ott, Ruiz, Brescovit & Bonaldo, 2017; Amazoonops cachimbo Ott, Ruiz, Brescovit & Bonaldo, 2017; Amazoonops caxiuana Ott, Ruiz, Brescovit & Bonaldo, 2017; Amazoonops ducke Ott, Ruiz, Brescovit & Bonaldo, 2017; Amazoonops juruti Ott, Ruiz, Brescovit & Bonaldo, 2017

Genus of spiders

Amazoonops is a genus of spiders in the family Oonopidae. It was first described in 2017 by Ott, Ruiz, Brescovit & Bonaldo. As of 2017, it contains 5 species, all from Brazil.
