= Khamisina =

Scientific classification
- Domain: Eukaryota
- Kingdom: Animalia
- Phylum: Arthropoda
- Subphylum: Chelicerata
- Class: Arachnida
- Order: Araneae
- Infraorder: Araneomorphae
- Family: Oonopidae
- Genus: Khamisina; Berniker

Species
- Khamisina ibadan Platnick & Berniker, 2015; Khamisina kilifi Platnick & Berniker, 2015; Khamisina kivu Platnick & Berniker, 2015

Genus of spiders

Khamisina is a genus of spiders in the family Oonopidae. It was first described in 2015 by Platnick & Berniker. As of 2016, it contains 3 African species.
