= Longoonops =

Scientific classification
- Domain: Eukaryota
- Kingdom: Animalia
- Phylum: Arthropoda
- Subphylum: Chelicerata
- Class: Arachnida
- Order: Araneae
- Infraorder: Araneomorphae
- Family: Oonopidae
- Genus: Longoonops; Dupérré

Type species
- Longoonops bicolor

Species
- 6, see text

Genus of spiders

Longoonops is a genus of spiders in the family Oonopidae. It was first described in 2010 by Platnick & Dupérré. As of 2017, it contains 6 species.

== Species ==
Longoonops comprises the following species:

- Longoonops bicolor Platnick & Dupérré, 2010
- Longoonops chickeringi Platnick & Dupérré, 2010
- Longoonops ellae Platnick, Dupérré & Berniker, 2013
- Longoonops gorda Platnick & Dupérré, 2010
- Longoonops noctucus (Chickering, 1969)
- Longoonops padiscus (Chickering, 1969)
