= Australoonops =

Scientific classification
- Kingdom: Animalia
- Phylum: Arthropoda
- Subphylum: Chelicerata
- Class: Arachnida
- Order: Araneae
- Infraorder: Araneomorphae
- Family: Oonopidae
- Genus: Australoonops; Hewitt

Species
- Australoonops granulatus Hewitt, 1915; Australoonops haddadi Platnick & Dupérré, 2010; Australoonops skaife Platnick & Dupérré, 2010

Genus of spiders

Australoonops is a genus of spiders in the family Oonopidae. It was first described in 1915 by John Hewitt.

Its three described species are found in South Africa, with two of them endemic, and one also found in Mozambique.

== Species ==
As of October 2025, this genus includes three species:

- Australoonops granulatus Hewitt, 1915 – South Africa (type species)
- Australoonops haddadi Platnick & Dupérré, 2010 – South Africa, Mozambique
- Australoonops skaife Platnick & Dupérré, 2010 – South Africa
