= Caecoonops =

Scientific classification
- Kingdom: Animalia
- Phylum: Arthropoda
- Subphylum: Chelicerata
- Class: Arachnida
- Order: Araneae
- Infraorder: Araneomorphae
- Family: Oonopidae
- Genus: Caecoonops; Benoit

Species
- Caecoonops apicotermitis Benoit, 1964; Caecoonops cubitermitis Benoit, 1964

Genus of spiders

Caecoonops is a genus of spiders in the family Oonopidae. It was first described in 1964 by Benoit. As of 2016, it contains 2 species.
