= Pseudodysderina =

Scientific classification
- Domain: Eukaryota
- Kingdom: Animalia
- Phylum: Arthropoda
- Subphylum: Chelicerata
- Class: Arachnida
- Order: Araneae
- Infraorder: Araneomorphae
- Family: Oonopidae
- Genus: Pseudodysderina; Bonaldo

Type species
- Pseudodysderina desultrix

Species
- 8, see text

Genus of spiders

Pseudodysderina is a genus of spiders in the family Oonopidae. It was first described in 2013 by Platnick, Berniker & Bonaldo. As of 2017, it contains 8 species, all of which are found in South America.

== Species ==
Pseudodysderina comprises the following species:

- Pseudodysderina beni Platnick, Berniker & Bonaldo, 2013
- Pseudodysderina desultrix (Keyserling, 1881)
- Pseudodysderina dracula Platnick, Berniker & Bonaldo, 2013
- Pseudodysderina hermani Platnick, Berniker & Bonaldo, 2013
- Pseudodysderina manu Platnick, Berniker & Bonaldo, 2013
- Pseudodysderina suiza Platnick, Berniker & Bonaldo, 2013
- Pseudodysderina utinga Platnick, Berniker & Bonaldo, 2013
- Pseudodysderina yungas Platnick, Berniker & Bonaldo, 2013
