= Himalayana =

Scientific classification
- Domain: Eukaryota
- Kingdom: Animalia
- Phylum: Arthropoda
- Subphylum: Chelicerata
- Class: Arachnida
- Order: Araneae
- Infraorder: Araneomorphae
- Family: Oonopidae
- Genus: Himalayana; Grismado

Type species
- Himalayana kathmandu

Species
- 6, see text

Genus of spiders

Himalayana is a genus of spiders in the family Oonopidae. It was first described in 2014 by Grismado. As of 2017, it contains 6 species from India and Nepal.

== Species ==
Himalayana comprises the following species:

- Himalayana andreae Grismado, 2014
- Himalayana castanopsis Grismado, 2014
- Himalayana kathmandu Grismado, 2014
- Himalayana martensi Grismado, 2014
- Himalayana parbat Grismado, 2014
- Himalayana siliwalae Grismado, 2014
