= Hortoonops =

Scientific classification
- Domain: Eukaryota
- Kingdom: Animalia
- Phylum: Arthropoda
- Subphylum: Chelicerata
- Class: Arachnida
- Order: Araneae
- Infraorder: Araneomorphae
- Family: Oonopidae
- Genus: Hortoonops; Dupérré

Species
- Hortoonops excavatus Platnick & Dupérré, 2012; Hortoonops lucradus (Chickering, 1969); Hortoonops portoricensis (Petrunkevitch, 1929)

Genus of spiders

Hortoonops is a genus of spiders in the family Oonopidae. It was first described in 2012 by Platnick & Dupérré. As of 2016, it contains 3 species.
