= Sicariomorpha =

Scientific classification
- Domain: Eukaryota
- Kingdom: Animalia
- Phylum: Arthropoda
- Subphylum: Chelicerata
- Class: Arachnida
- Order: Araneae
- Infraorder: Araneomorphae
- Family: Oonopidae
- Genus: Sicariomorpha
- Species: S. maschwitzi

Binomial name
- Sicariomorpha maschwitzi (Wunderlich, 1995)

Genus of spiders

Sicariomorpha is a genus of spiders in the family Oonopidae. It was first described in 2015 by Ott & Harvey. As of 2017, it contains only one species, Sicariomorpha maschwitzi, found in Malaysia.
