= Prodysderina =

Scientific classification
- Domain: Eukaryota
- Kingdom: Animalia
- Phylum: Arthropoda
- Subphylum: Chelicerata
- Class: Arachnida
- Order: Araneae
- Infraorder: Araneomorphae
- Family: Oonopidae
- Genus: Prodysderina al.

Type species
- Prodysderina armata

Species
- 9, see text

Genus of spiders

Prodysderina is a genus of spiders in the family Oonopidae. It was first described in 2013 by Platnick et al.. As of 2017, it contains 9 species.

== Species ==
Prodysderina comprises the following species:

- Prodysderina armata (Simon, 1893)
- Prodysderina filandia Platnick, Dupérré, Berniker & Bonaldo, 2013
- Prodysderina janetae Platnick, Dupérré, Berniker & Bonaldo, 2013
- Prodysderina megarmata Platnick, Dupérré, Berniker & Bonaldo, 2013
- Prodysderina otun Platnick, Dupérré, Berniker & Bonaldo, 2013
- Prodysderina piedecuesta Platnick, Dupérré, Berniker & Bonaldo, 2013
- Prodysderina rasgon Platnick, Dupérré, Berniker & Bonaldo, 2013
- Prodysderina rollardae Platnick, Dupérré, Berniker & Bonaldo, 2013
- Prodysderina santander Platnick, Dupérré, Berniker & Bonaldo, 2013
