= Aschnaoonops =

Scientific classification
- Domain: Eukaryota
- Kingdom: Animalia
- Phylum: Arthropoda
- Subphylum: Chelicerata
- Class: Arachnida
- Order: Araneae
- Infraorder: Araneomorphae
- Family: Oonopidae
- Genus: Aschnaoonops; Ezzatpanah

Type species
- Aschnaoonops aschnae

Species
- 41, see text

Genus of spiders

Aschnaoonops is a genus of spiders in the family Oonopidae. It was first described in 2011 by Makhan & Ezzatpanah. As of 2017, it contains 41 species.

== Species ==
Aschnaoonops comprises the following species:

- Aschnaoonops alban Platnick, Dupérré, Berniker & Bonaldo, 2013
- Aschnaoonops aquada Platnick, Dupérré, Berniker & Bonaldo, 2013
- Aschnaoonops aschnae Makhan & Ezzatpanah, 2011
- Aschnaoonops belem Platnick, Dupérré, Berniker & Bonaldo, 2013
- Aschnaoonops bocono Platnick, Dupérré, Berniker & Bonaldo, 2013
- Aschnaoonops caninde Platnick, Dupérré, Berniker & Bonaldo, 2013
- Aschnaoonops chingaza Platnick, Dupérré, Berniker & Bonaldo, 2013
- Aschnaoonops chorro Platnick, Dupérré, Berniker & Bonaldo, 2013
- Aschnaoonops cosanga Platnick, Dupérré, Berniker & Bonaldo, 2013
- Aschnaoonops cristalina Platnick, Dupérré, Berniker & Bonaldo, 2013
- Aschnaoonops gorda Platnick, Dupérré, Berniker & Bonaldo, 2013
- Aschnaoonops huila Platnick, Dupérré, Berniker & Bonaldo, 2013
- Aschnaoonops indio Platnick, Dupérré, Berniker & Bonaldo, 2013
- Aschnaoonops jaji Platnick, Dupérré, Berniker & Bonaldo, 2013
- Aschnaoonops jatun Platnick, Dupérré, Berniker & Bonaldo, 2013
- Aschnaoonops leticia Platnick, Dupérré, Berniker & Bonaldo, 2013
- Aschnaoonops malkini Platnick, Dupérré, Berniker & Bonaldo, 2013
- Aschnaoonops margaretae Platnick, Dupérré, Berniker & Bonaldo, 2013
- Aschnaoonops marshalli Platnick, Dupérré, Berniker & Bonaldo, 2013
- Aschnaoonops marta Platnick, Dupérré, Berniker & Bonaldo, 2013
- Aschnaoonops masneri Platnick, Dupérré, Berniker & Bonaldo, 2013
- Aschnaoonops merida Platnick, Dupérré, Berniker & Bonaldo, 2013
- Aschnaoonops meta Platnick, Dupérré, Berniker & Bonaldo, 2013
- Aschnaoonops orito Platnick, Dupérré, Berniker & Bonaldo, 2013
- Aschnaoonops paez Platnick, Dupérré, Berniker & Bonaldo, 2013
- Aschnaoonops pamplona Platnick, Dupérré, Berniker & Bonaldo, 2013
- Aschnaoonops pedro Platnick, Dupérré, Berniker & Bonaldo, 2013
- Aschnaoonops pira Platnick, Dupérré, Berniker & Bonaldo, 2013
- Aschnaoonops propinquus (Keyserling, 1881)
- Aschnaoonops ramirezi Platnick, Dupérré, Berniker & Bonaldo, 2013
- Aschnaoonops silvae Platnick, Dupérré, Berniker & Bonaldo, 2013
- Aschnaoonops similis (Keyserling, 1881)
- Aschnaoonops simla (Chickering, 1968)
- Aschnaoonops simoni Platnick, Dupérré, Berniker & Bonaldo, 2013
- Aschnaoonops tachira Platnick, Dupérré, Berniker & Bonaldo, 2013
- Aschnaoonops tariba Platnick, Dupérré, Berniker & Bonaldo, 2013
- Aschnaoonops teleferico Platnick, Dupérré, Berniker & Bonaldo, 2013
- Aschnaoonops tiputini Platnick, Dupérré, Berniker & Bonaldo, 2013
- Aschnaoonops trujillo Platnick, Dupérré, Berniker & Bonaldo, 2013
- Aschnaoonops villalba Platnick, Dupérré, Berniker & Bonaldo, 2013
- Aschnaoonops yasuni Platnick, Dupérré, Berniker & Bonaldo, 2013
