= Neotrops =

Scientific classification
- Kingdom: Animalia
- Phylum: Arthropoda
- Subphylum: Chelicerata
- Class: Arachnida
- Order: Araneae
- Infraorder: Araneomorphae
- Family: Oonopidae
- Genus: Neotrops; Ramírez

Type species
- Neotrops darwini

Species
- 28, see text

Genus of spiders

Neotrops is a genus of spiders in the family Oonopidae. It was first described in 2013 by Grismado & Ramírez. As of 2017, it contains 28 species.

== Species ==
Neotrops comprises the following species:

- Neotrops amacuro Grismado & Ramírez, 2013 — Venezuela
- Neotrops avalosi Grismado & Ramírez, 2013 — Paraguay, Argentina
- Neotrops caparu Grismado & Ramírez, 2013 — Colombia
- Neotrops darwini Grismado & Ramírez, 2013 (type) — Argentina, Uruguay
- Neotrops donaldi (Chickering, 1951) — Panama
- Neotrops izquierdoi Grismado & Ramírez, 2013 — Bolivia
- Neotrops kopuchianae Grismado & Ramírez, 2013 — Bolivia
- Neotrops labarquei Grismado & Ramírez, 2013 — Uruguay
- Neotrops lopardoae Grismado & Ramírez, 2013 — Argentina
- Neotrops lorenae Grismado & Ramírez, 2013 — Argentina, Uruguay
- Neotrops maracay Grismado & Ramírez, 2013 — Venezuela
- Neotrops nigromaculatus (Mello-Leitão, 1944) — Argentina, Uruguay
- Neotrops pakitza Grismado & Ramírez, 2013 — Peru
- Neotrops piacentinii Grismado & Ramírez, 2013 — Argentina
- Neotrops pithecia Grismado & Ramírez, 2013 — Peru
- Neotrops platnicki Grismado & Ramírez, 2013 — Ecuador
- Neotrops poguazu Grismado & Ramírez, 2013 — Argentina
- Neotrops pombero Grismado & Ramírez, 2013 — Paraguay, Argentina
- Neotrops ramirezi Izquierdo & Grismado, 2014 — Colombia
- Neotrops rubioi Grismado & Ramírez, 2013 — Paraguay, Argentina
- Neotrops santamarta Grismado & Ramírez, 2013 — Colombia
- Neotrops sciosciae Grismado & Ramírez, 2013 — Argentina, Uruguay
- Neotrops silvae Grismado & Ramírez, 2013 — Peru
- Neotrops trapellus (Chickering, 1970) — Trinidad, Venezuela
- Neotrops tucumanus (Simon, 1907) — Argentina
- Neotrops waorani Grismado & Ramírez, 2013 — Ecuador
- Neotrops yabare Grismado & Ramírez, 2013 — Bolivia
- Neotrops yunga Grismado & Ramírez, 2013 — Argentina
