= Anophthalmoonops =

Scientific classification
- Kingdom: Animalia
- Phylum: Arthropoda
- Subphylum: Chelicerata
- Class: Arachnida
- Order: Araneae
- Infraorder: Araneomorphae
- Family: Oonopidae
- Genus: Anophthalmoonops; Benoit, 1976
- Species: A. thoracotermitis

Binomial name
- Anophthalmoonops thoracotermitis Benoit, 1976

Genus of spiders

Anophthalmoonops is a monotypic genus of spiders in the family Oonopidae. It was first described by Benoit in 1976. As of 2023, it contains only one species, Anophthalmoonops thoracotermitis found in Angola.
