= Xiombarg =

Scientific classification
- Kingdom: Animalia
- Phylum: Arthropoda
- Subphylum: Chelicerata
- Class: Arachnida
- Order: Araneae
- Infraorder: Araneomorphae
- Family: Oonopidae
- Genus: Xiombarg; Brignoli, 1979
- Species: X. plaumanni

Binomial name
- Xiombarg plaumanni Brignoli, 1979

Species of spider

Xiombarg is a monotypic genus of spiders in the family Oonopidae containing the single species, Xiombarg plaumanni, occurring in southeastern Brazil and adjacent Argentina.

== Taxonomy ==
Italian arachnologist Paolo Marcello Brignoli described X. plaumanni in 1979, naming the genus after Xiombarg, a character in Michael Moorcock novels. The holotype was collected by F. Plaumann.

== Distribution ==
Xiombarg plaumanni has been recorded from Brazil and Argentina.
