= Nephrochirus =

Scientific classification
- Kingdom: Animalia
- Phylum: Arthropoda
- Subphylum: Chelicerata
- Class: Arachnida
- Order: Araneae
- Infraorder: Araneomorphae
- Family: Oonopidae
- Genus: Nephrochirus; Simon, 1910
- Species: N. copulatus

Binomial name
- Nephrochirus copulatus Simon, 1910

Genus of spiders

Nephrochirus is a genus of spiders in the family Oonopidae. It was first described in 1910 by Simon. As of 2017, it contains only one species, Nephrochirus copulatus, collected in Namibia.
