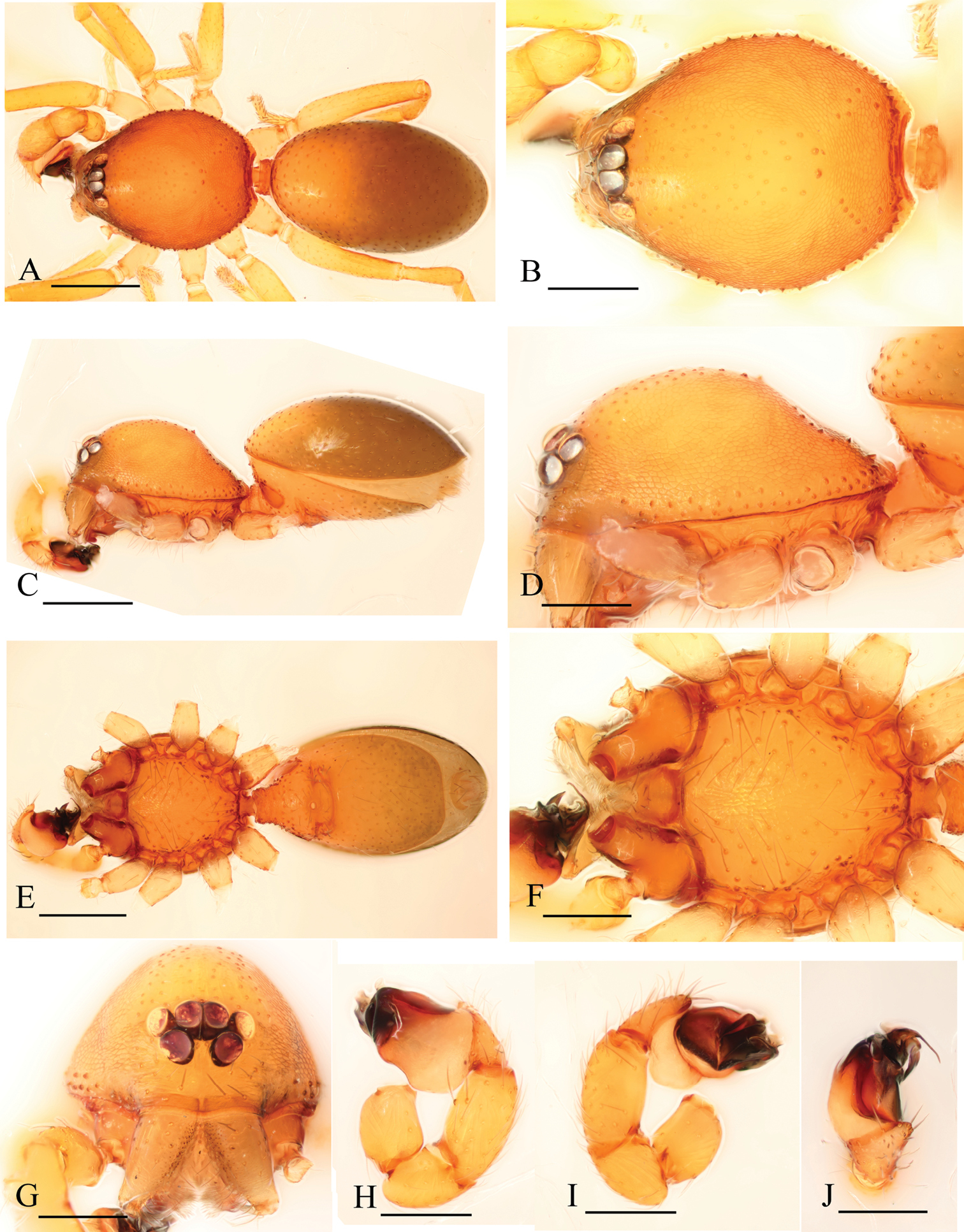
- X. hwangi, male

Scientific classification
- Kingdom: Animalia
- Phylum: Arthropoda
- Subphylum: Chelicerata
- Class: Arachnida
- Order: Araneae
- Infraorder: Araneomorphae
- Family: Oonopidae
- Genus: Xyphinus; Simon, 1893

Type species
- X. hystrix Simon, 1893

Species
- 20, see text

Synonyms
- Pseudotriaeris Brignoli, 1974

= Xyphinus =

Genus of spiders

Xyphinus is a genus of goblin spiders that was first described by Eugène Louis Simon in 1893.

== Species ==
As of June 2019 it contains twenty species, found only in Asia, India, and Australia:

- Xyphinus abanghamidi Deeleman-Reinhold, 1987 – Borneo
- Xyphinus acutus Kranz-Baltensperger, 2014 – Borneo
- Xyphinus baehrae Kranz-Baltensperger, 2014 – India to Australia
- Xyphinus deelemanae Kranz-Baltensperger, 2014 – Borneo
- Xyphinus distortus Kranz-Baltensperger, 2014 – Thailand, Malaysia
- Xyphinus gibber Deeleman-Reinhold, 1987 – Borneo
- Xyphinus holgeri Kranz-Baltensperger, 2014 – Thailand, Laos, Malaysia, Indonesia (Borneo), Brunei
- Xyphinus hwangi Tong & Li, 2014 – Taiwan
- Xyphinus hystrix Simon, 1893 (type) – Malaysia, Singapore
- Xyphinus infaustus Kranz-Baltensperger, 2014 – Indonesia (Sumatra)
- Xyphinus karschi (Bösenberg & Strand, 1906) – China, Thailand, Taiwan, Japan
- Xyphinus krabi Kranz-Baltensperger, 2014 – Thailand
- Xyphinus lemniscatus Deeleman-Reinhold, 1987 – Borneo
- Xyphinus montanus Deeleman-Reinhold, 1987 – Borneo
- Xyphinus pachara Kranz-Baltensperger, 2014 – Malaysia
- Xyphinus pakse Tong & Li, 2013 – Laos
- Xyphinus rogerfedereri Kranz-Baltensperger, 2014 – Malaysia, Thailand
- Xyphinus sabal Kranz-Baltensperger, 2014 – Borneo
- Xyphinus xanthus Deeleman-Reinhold, 1987 – Borneo
- Xyphinus xelo Deeleman-Reinhold, 1987 – Malaysia
