= Stenoonops =

Stenoonops Temporal range: Palaeogene–present

Scientific classification
- Kingdom: Animalia
- Phylum: Arthropoda
- Subphylum: Chelicerata
- Class: Arachnida
- Order: Araneae
- Infraorder: Araneomorphae
- Family: Oonopidae
- Genus: Stenoonops; Simon

Type species
- Stenoonops scabriculus

Species
- 28, see text

Genus of spiders

Stenoonops is a genus of spiders in the family Oonopidae. It was first described in 1892 by Simon. As of 2017, it contains 28 species.

== Species ==
Stenoonops comprises the following species:

- Stenoonops alazan Platnick & Dupérré, 2010
- Stenoonops belmopan Platnick & Dupérré, 2010
- Stenoonops bimini Platnick & Dupérré, 2010
- Stenoonops brendae Platnick, Dupérré & Berniker, 2013
- Stenoonops cabo Platnick & Dupérré, 2010
- Stenoonops canita Platnick & Dupérré, 2010
- Stenoonops dimotus Chickering, 1969
- Stenoonops egenulus Simon, 1893
- Stenoonops exgord Platnick & Dupérré, 2010
- Stenoonops insolitus Chickering, 1969
- Stenoonops jara Platnick & Dupérré, 2010
- Stenoonops kochalkai Platnick & Dupérré, 2010
- Stenoonops luquillo Platnick & Dupérré, 2010
- Stenoonops macabus Chickering, 1969
- Stenoonops mandeville Platnick & Dupérré, 2010
- Stenoonops murphyorum Platnick & Dupérré, 2010
- Stenoonops opisthornatus Benoit, 1979
- Stenoonops peckorum Platnick & Dupérré, 2010
- Stenoonops petrunkevitchi Chickering, 1951
- Stenoonops pretiosus (Bryant, 1942)
- Stenoonops saba Platnick & Dupérré, 2010
- Stenoonops saintjohn Platnick & Dupérré, 2010
- Stenoonops scabriculus Simon, 1892
- Stenoonops schuhi Platnick, Dupérré & Berniker, 2013
- Stenoonops simla Platnick & Dupérré, 2010
- Stenoonops tayrona Platnick & Dupérré, 2010
- Stenoonops tobyi Platnick, Dupérré & Berniker, 2013
- Stenoonops tortola Platnick & Dupérré, 2010
