= Vientianea =

Scientific classification
- Kingdom: Animalia
- Phylum: Arthropoda
- Subphylum: Chelicerata
- Class: Arachnida
- Order: Araneae
- Infraorder: Araneomorphae
- Family: Oonopidae
- Genus: Vientianea; Tong & Li, 2013
- Species: V. peterjaegeri

Binomial name
- Vientianea peterjaegeri Tong & Li, 2013

Genus of spiders

Vientianea is a monotypic genus of Laotian goblin spiders containing the single species, Vientianea peterjaegeri. It was first described by Y. F. Tong & S. Q. Li in 2013, and is only found in Laos.
