= Neoxyphinus =

Scientific classification
- Kingdom: Animalia
- Phylum: Arthropoda
- Subphylum: Chelicerata
- Class: Arachnida
- Order: Araneae
- Infraorder: Araneomorphae
- Family: Oonopidae
- Genus: Neoxyphinus; Birabén

Species
- 48, see text

Genus of spiders

Neoxyphinus is a genus of spiders in the family Oonopidae. It was first described in 1953 by Birabén. As of 2017, it contains 48 species.

== Species ==
Neoxyphinus comprises the following species:

- Neoxyphinus almerim Feitosa & Bonaldo, 2017 - Brazil
- Neoxyphinus amazonicus Moss & Feitosa, 2016 - Brazil
- Neoxyphinus axe Abrahim & Brescovit, 2012 - Brazil
- Neoxyphinus barreirosi Abrahim & Bonaldo, 2012 - Colombia, Venezuela, Guyana, Brazil
- Neoxyphinus belterra Feitosa & Ruiz, 2017 - Brazil
- Neoxyphinus beni Moss & Feitosa, 2016 - Bolivia
- Neoxyphinus boibumba Abrahim & Rheims, 2012 - Brazil
- Neoxyphinus cachimbo Feitosa & Moss, 2017 - Brazil
- Neoxyphinus cantareira Feitosa & Ruiz, 2017 - Brazil
- Neoxyphinus capiranga Feitosa & Moss, 2017 - Brazil
- Neoxyphinus caprichoso Feitosa & Ruiz, 2017 - Brazil
- Neoxyphinus carigoblin Feitosa & Moss, 2017 - Brazil
- Neoxyphinus cavus Feitosa & Bonaldo, 2017 - Brazil
- Neoxyphinus caxiuana Feitosa & Moss, 2017 - Brazil
- Neoxyphinus celluliticus Feitosa & Ruiz, 2017 - Brazil
- Neoxyphinus coari Feitosa & Moss, 2017 - Brazil
- Neoxyphinus coca Moss & Feitosa, 2016 - Ecuador
- Neoxyphinus crasto Feitosa & Moss, 2017 - Brazil
- Neoxyphinus ducke Feitosa & Moss, 2017 - Brazil
- Neoxyphinus furtivus (Chickering, 1968) - Jamaica, Trinidad, Brazil
- Neoxyphinus garantido Feitosa & Moss, 2017 - Brazil
- Neoxyphinus gregoblin Abrahim & Santos, 2012 - Venezuela
- Neoxyphinus hispidus (Dumitrescu & Georgescu, 1987) - Venezuela
- Neoxyphinus inca Moss & Ruiz, 2016 - Peru
- Neoxyphinus jacareacanga Feitosa & Moss, 2017 - Brazil
- Neoxyphinus keyserlingi (Simon, 1907) - Brazil
- Neoxyphinus macuna Moss & Ruiz, 2016 - Columbia
- Neoxyphinus meurei Feitosa & Moss, 2017 - Brazil
- Neoxyphinus murici Feitosa & Moss, 2017 - Brazil
- Neoxyphinus mutum Feitosa & Moss, 2017 - Brazil
- Neoxyphinus novalima Feitosa & Moss, 2017 - Brazil
- Neoxyphinus ornithogoblin Feitosa & Moss, 2017 - Brazil
- Neoxyphinus paraiba Feitosa & Moss, 2017 - Brazil
- Neoxyphinus paraty Feitosa & Moss, 2017 - Brazil
- Neoxyphinus petrogoblin Abrahim & Ott, 2012 - Colombia, Ecuador, Peru, Brazil
- Neoxyphinus pure Moss & Bonaldo, 2016 - Colombia
- Neoxyphinus rio Feitosa & Moss, 2017 - Brazil
- Neoxyphinus saarineni Moss & Bonaldo, 2016 - Venezuela
- Neoxyphinus sax Feitosa & Moss, 2017 - Brazil
- Neoxyphinus simsinho Feitosa & Moss, 2017 - Brazil
- Neoxyphinus stigmatus Feitosa & Moss, 2017 - Brazil
- Neoxyphinus termitophilus (Bristowe, 1938) - Brazil, Argentina
- Neoxyphinus trujillo Moss & Bonaldo, 2016 - Venezuela
- Neoxyphinus tucuma Feitosa & Moss, 2017 - Brazil
- Neoxyphinus tuparro Moss & Ruiz, 2016 - Colombia
- Neoxyphinus xyphinoides (Chamberlin & Ivie, 1942) - Guyana
- Neoxyphinus yacambu Moss & Feitosa, 2016 - Venezuela
- Neoxyphinus yekuana Moss & Feitosa, 2016 - Venezuela
