= Dalmasula =

Scientific classification
- Kingdom: Animalia
- Phylum: Arthropoda
- Subphylum: Chelicerata
- Class: Arachnida
- Order: Araneae
- Infraorder: Araneomorphae
- Family: Oonopidae
- Genus: Dalmasula; Platnick, Szüts, & Ubick, 2012

Type species
- Dalmasula lorelei Platnick & Dupérré, 2012

Species
- 5, see text

Genus of spiders

Dalmasula is a genus of goblin spiders containing five species occurring in Namibia and South Africa.

Males range from 1.7–2.8 mm in length, females 2.2–3.1 mm. The cephalothorax is orange or yellow, and the abdomen is white.

== Species ==
As of October 2025, this genus includes five species:

- Dalmasula dodebai Szűts & Ubick, 2012 – South Africa
- Dalmasula griswoldi Szűts & Ubick, 2012 – South Africa
- Dalmasula lorelei Platnick & Dupérré, 2012 – Namibia (type species)
- Dalmasula parvimana (Simon, 1910) – Namibia
- Dalmasula tsumkwe Platnick & Dupérré, 2012 – Namibia
