= Toloonops =

Scientific classification
- Domain: Eukaryota
- Kingdom: Animalia
- Phylum: Arthropoda
- Subphylum: Chelicerata
- Class: Arachnida
- Order: Araneae
- Infraorder: Araneomorphae
- Family: Oonopidae
- Genus: Toloonops; Berniker

Type species
- Toloonops chiapa

Species
- 7, see text

Genus of spiders

Toloonops is a genus of spiders in the family Oonopidae. It was first described in 2015 by Bolzern, Platnick & Berniker. As of 2017, it contains 7 species.

== Species ==
Toloonops comprises the following species:

- Toloonops belmo Bolzern, Platnick & Berniker, 2015
- Toloonops chiapa Bolzern, Platnick & Berniker, 2015
- Toloonops chickeringi (Brignoli, 1974)
- Toloonops jacala Bolzern, Platnick & Berniker, 2015
- Toloonops tolucanus (Gertsch & Davis, 1942)
- Toloonops veracruz Bolzern, Platnick & Berniker, 2015
- Toloonops verapaz Bolzern, Platnick & Berniker, 2015
