= Scaphidysderina =

Scientific classification
- Domain: Eukaryota
- Kingdom: Animalia
- Phylum: Arthropoda
- Subphylum: Chelicerata
- Class: Arachnida
- Order: Araneae
- Infraorder: Araneomorphae
- Family: Oonopidae
- Genus: Scaphidysderina; Dupérré

Species
- 17, see text

Genus of spiders

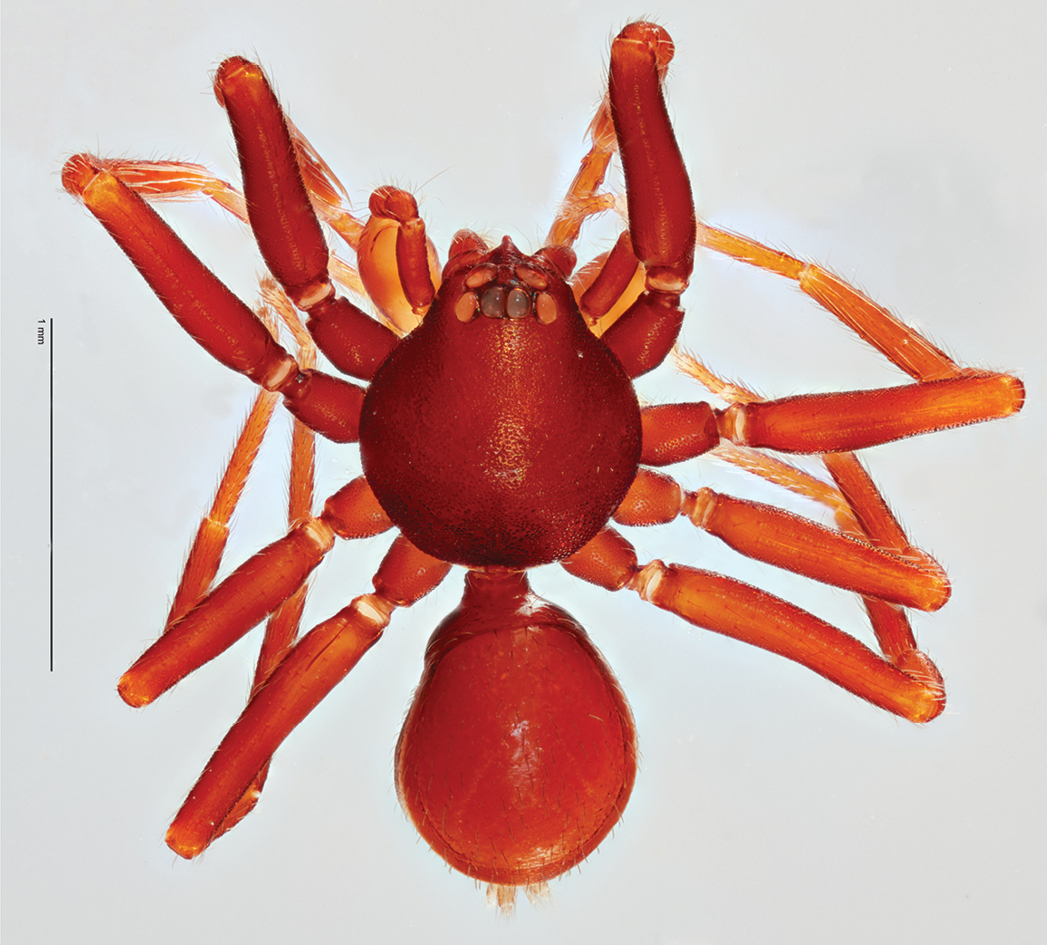
Dorsal view of Scaphidysderina lubanako

Scaphidysderina is a genus of spiders in the family Oonopidae. It was first described in 2011 by Platnick & Dupérré. As of 2017, it contains 17 species from Ecuador, Colombia, and Peru.

== Species ==
Scaphidysderina comprises the following species:

- Scaphidysderina andersoni Platnick & Dupérré, 2011
- Scaphidysderina baerti Platnick & Dupérré, 2011
- Scaphidysderina cajamarca Platnick & Dupérré, 2011
- Scaphidysderina cotopaxi Platnick & Dupérré, 2011
- Scaphidysderina hormigai Platnick & Dupérré, 2011
- Scaphidysderina iguaque Platnick & Dupérré, 2011
- Scaphidysderina loja Platnick & Dupérré, 2011
- Scaphidysderina manu Platnick & Dupérré, 2011
- Scaphidysderina molleturo Platnick & Dupérré, 2011
- Scaphidysderina napo Platnick & Dupérré, 2011
- Scaphidysderina pagoreni Platnick & Dupérré, 2011
- Scaphidysderina palenque Platnick & Dupérré, 2011
- Scaphidysderina pinocchio Platnick & Dupérré, 2011
- Scaphidysderina scutata Platnick & Dupérré, 2011
- Scaphidysderina tandapi Platnick & Dupérré, 2011
- Scaphidysderina tapiai Platnick & Dupérré, 2011
- Scaphidysderina tayos Platnick & Dupérré, 2011
