= Khamisia =

Scientific classification
- Domain: Eukaryota
- Kingdom: Animalia
- Phylum: Arthropoda
- Subphylum: Chelicerata
- Class: Arachnida
- Order: Araneae
- Infraorder: Araneomorphae
- Family: Oonopidae
- Genus: Khamisia; Harten

Species
- Khamisia atlit Platnick & Berniker, 2015; Khamisia banisad Saaristo & van Harten, 2006; Khamisia hayer Platnick & Berniker, 2015; Khamisia holmi Platnick & Berniker, 2015

Genus of spiders

Khamisia is a genus of spiders in the family Oonopidae. It was first described in 2006 by Saaristo & van Harten. As of 2016, it contains 4 species.
