= Simlops =

Scientific classification
- Domain: Eukaryota
- Kingdom: Animalia
- Phylum: Arthropoda
- Subphylum: Chelicerata
- Class: Arachnida
- Order: Araneae
- Infraorder: Araneomorphae
- Family: Oonopidae
- Genus: Simlops; Ruiz

Type species
- Simlops pennai

Species
- 15, see text

Genus of spiders

Simlops is a genus of spiders in the family Oonopidae. It was first described in 2014 by Bonaldo, Ott & Ruiz. As of 2017, it contains 15 species.

== Species ==
Simlops comprises the following species:

- Simlops bandeirante Ott, 2014
- Simlops bodanus (Chickering, 1968)
- Simlops cachorro Ruiz, 2014
- Simlops campinarana Brescovit, 2014
- Simlops cristinae Santos, 2014
- Simlops guatopo Brescovit, 2014
- Simlops guyanensis Santos, 2014
- Simlops jamesbondi Bonaldo, 2014
- Simlops juruti Bonaldo, 2014
- Simlops machadoi Ott, 2014
- Simlops miudo Ruiz, 2014
- Simlops nadinae Ruiz, 2014
- Simlops pennai Bonaldo, 2014
- Simlops platnicki Bonaldo, 2014
- Simlops similis Ott, 2014
