= Puan (spider) =

Scientific classification
- Kingdom: Animalia
- Phylum: Arthropoda
- Subphylum: Chelicerata
- Class: Arachnida
- Order: Araneae
- Infraorder: Araneomorphae
- Family: Oonopidae
- Genus: Puan; Izquierdo, 2012

Type species
- P. chechehet Izquierdo, 2012

Species
- P. chechehet Izquierdo, 2012 — Argentina; P. nair Izquierdo, 2012 — Argentina

Genus of spiders

Puan is a genus of South American goblin spiders first described by M. A. Izquierdo, N. Ferretti & G. Pompozzi in 2012. Both described species are endemic to Argentina.

== Species ==
As of October 2025, this genus includes two species:

- Puan chechehet Izquierdo, 2012 – Argentina (type species)
- Puan nair Izquierdo, 2012 – Argentina
