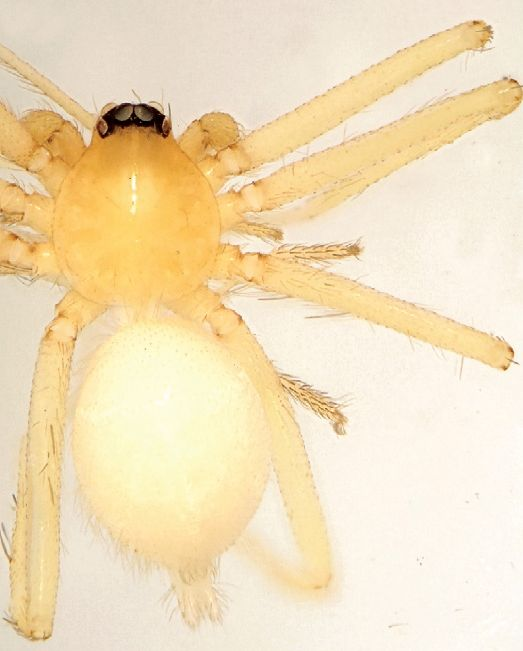
- M. avonra, male

Scientific classification
- Kingdom: Animalia
- Phylum: Arthropoda
- Subphylum: Chelicerata
- Class: Arachnida
- Order: Araneae
- Infraorder: Araneomorphae
- Family: Oonopidae
- Genus: Megaoonops
- Species: M. avrona

Binomial name
- Megaoonops avrona Saaristo, 2007

= Megaoonops =

Genus of spiders

Megaoonops is a genus of goblin spiders first described by Michael Saaristo in 2007. As of February 2019, it contains only one species, Megaoonops avrona.
