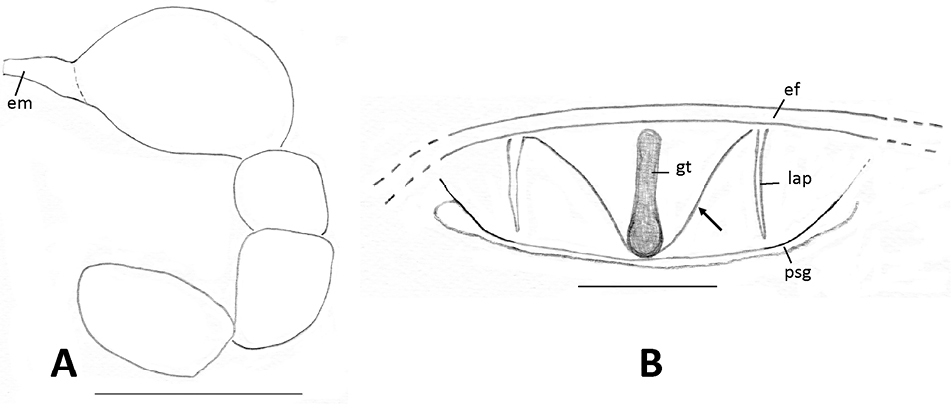

Scientific classification
- Kingdom: Animalia
- Phylum: Arthropoda
- Subphylum: Chelicerata
- Class: Arachnida
- Order: Araneae
- Infraorder: Araneomorphae
- Family: Oonopidae
- Genus: Cavisternum; Baehr, Harvey & Smith, 2010

= Cavisternum =

Genus of spiders

Cavisternum is a genus of goblin spider. All its species are native to Australia.

== Species ==
As of May 2021, the World Spider Catalog accepted the following species:

- Cavisternum attenboroughi Baehr & Raven, 2013 – Australia (Northern Territory)
- Cavisternum bagleyae Baehr, Harvey & Smith, 2010 – Australia (Queensland)
- Cavisternum barthorum Baehr, Harvey & Smith, 2010 – Australia (Queensland)
- Cavisternum bertmaini Baehr, Harvey & Smith, 2010 – Australia (Western Australia)
- Cavisternum bom Ranasinghe & Benjamin, 2018 – Sri Lanka
- Cavisternum carae Baehr, Harvey & Smith, 2010 – Australia (Northern Territory)
- Cavisternum clavatum Baehr, Harvey & Smith, 2010 (type species) – Australia (Western Australia)
- Cavisternum digweedi Baehr, Harvey & Smith, 2010 – Australia (Northern Territory)
- Cavisternum ewani Baehr, Harvey & Smith, 2010 – Australia (Queensland)
- Cavisternum federicae Baehr & Harvey, 2010 – Australia (Queensland)
- Cavisternum foxae Baehr, Harvey & Smith, 2010 – Australia (Queensland)
- Cavisternum gatangel Baehr, Harvey & Smith, 2010 – Australia (Queensland)
- Cavisternum gillespieae Harvey & Baehr, 2013 – Australia (Northern Territory)
- Cavisternum heywoodi Baehr, Harvey & Smith, 2010 – Australia (Queensland)
- Cavisternum hughesi Baehr, Harvey & Smith, 2010 – Australia (Queensland)
- Cavisternum ledereri Baehr, Harvey & Smith, 2010 – Australia (Queensland)
- Cavisternum leichhardti Harvey & Baehr, 2013 – Australia (Northern Territory)
- Cavisternum maxmoormanni Baehr, Harvey & Smith, 2010 – Australia (Northern Territory)
- Cavisternum mayorum Baehr, Harvey & Smith, 2010 – Australia (Queensland)
- Cavisternum michaelbellomoi Baehr, Harvey & Smith, 2010 – Australia (Queensland)
- Cavisternum monteithi Baehr & Harvey, 2010 – Australia (Queensland)
- Cavisternum noelashepherdae Baehr, Harvey & Smith, 2010 – Australia (Northern Territory)
- Cavisternum rochesterae Baehr, Harvey & Smith, 2010 – Australia (Queensland)
- Cavisternum toadshow Baehr, Harvey & Smith, 2010 – Australia (Queensland)
- Cavisternum waldockae Baehr, Harvey & Smith, 2010 – Australia (Western Australia)
