= Kachinia =

Scientific classification
- Kingdom: Animalia
- Phylum: Arthropoda
- Subphylum: Chelicerata
- Class: Arachnida
- Order: Araneae
- Infraorder: Araneomorphae
- Family: Oonopidae
- Genus: Kachinia; Tong & Li, 2018

Type species
- K. putao Tong & Li, 2018

Species
- Kachinia mahmolae Tong & Li, 2018; Kachinia putao Tong & Li, 2018

Genus of spiders

Kachinia is a small genus of southeast Asian goblin spiders. It was first described by Y. F. Tong, H. F. Chen and S. J. Liu in 2018, and it has only been found in Myanmar. As of April 2022 it contains only two species: K. mahmolae and K. putao.
