= Malagiella =

Scientific classification
- Kingdom: Animalia
- Phylum: Arthropoda
- Subphylum: Chelicerata
- Class: Arachnida
- Order: Araneae
- Infraorder: Araneomorphae
- Family: Oonopidae
- Genus: Malagiella; Griswold

Type species
- Malagiella ranomafana

Species
- 10, see text

Genus of spiders

Malagiella is a genus of spiders in the family Oonopidae. It was first described in 2011 by Ubick & Griswold. As of 2017, it contains 10 species, all from Madagascar.

== Species ==
Malagiella comprises the following species:

- Malagiella ambalavo Ubick & Griswold, 2011
- Malagiella andringitra Ubick & Griswold, 2011
- Malagiella fisheri Ubick & Griswold, 2011
- Malagiella goodmani Ubick & Griswold, 2011
- Malagiella nikina Ubick & Griswold, 2011
- Malagiella ranavalona Ubick & Griswold, 2011
- Malagiella ranomafana Ubick & Griswold, 2011
- Malagiella toliara Ubick & Griswold, 2011
- Malagiella valterova Ubick & Griswold, 2011
- Malagiella vohiparara Ubick & Griswold, 2011
