= Melchisedec =

Scientific classification
- Kingdom: Animalia
- Phylum: Arthropoda
- Subphylum: Chelicerata
- Class: Arachnida
- Order: Araneae
- Infraorder: Araneomorphae
- Family: Oonopidae
- Genus: Melchisedec; Fannes, 2010

Type species
- M. thevenot Fannes, 2010

Species
- M. birni Fannes, 2010 — Niger; M. thevenot Fannes, 2010 — West, East Africa

Genus of spiders

Melchisedec is a genus of African goblin spiders first described by W. Fannes in 2010. As of April 2019 it contains only two species.
