= Tinadysderina =

Scientific classification
- Domain: Eukaryota
- Kingdom: Animalia
- Phylum: Arthropoda
- Subphylum: Chelicerata
- Class: Arachnida
- Order: Araneae
- Infraorder: Araneomorphae
- Family: Oonopidae
- Genus: Tinadysderina; Bonaldo

Type species
- Tinadysderina tinalandia

Species
- 6, see text

Genus of spiders

Tinadysderina is a genus of spiders in the family Oonopidae. It was first described in 2013 by Platnick, Berniker & Bonaldo. As of 2017, it contains 6 species from Colombia and Ecuador.

== Species ==
Tinadysderina comprises the following species:

- Tinadysderina bremen Platnick, Berniker & Bonaldo, 2013
- Tinadysderina gorgona Platnick, Berniker & Bonaldo, 2013
- Tinadysderina otonga Platnick, Berniker & Bonaldo, 2013
- Tinadysderina pereira Platnick, Berniker & Bonaldo, 2013
- Tinadysderina planada Platnick, Berniker & Bonaldo, 2013
- Tinadysderina tinalandia Platnick, Berniker & Bonaldo, 2013
