= Tridysderina =

Scientific classification
- Kingdom: Animalia
- Phylum: Arthropoda
- Subphylum: Chelicerata
- Class: Arachnida
- Order: Araneae
- Infraorder: Araneomorphae
- Family: Oonopidae
- Genus: Tridysderina; Platnick, Berniker & Bonaldo, 2013

Type species
- T. yasuni Platnick, Berniker & Bonaldo, 2013

Species
- 6, see text

Genus of spiders

Tridysderina is a genus of Ecuadorian goblin spiders that was first described by Norman I. Platnick, L. Berniker & A. B. Bonaldo in 2013.

== Species ==
As of June 2019 it contains six species, found only in Ecuador:

- Tridysderina archidona Platnick, Berniker & Bonaldo, 2013 – Ecuador
- Tridysderina bellavista Platnick, Berniker & Bonaldo, 2013 – Ecuador
- Tridysderina galeras Platnick, Berniker & Bonaldo, 2013 – Ecuador
- Tridysderina jatun Platnick, Berniker & Bonaldo, 2013 – Ecuador
- Tridysderina tena Platnick, Berniker & Bonaldo, 2013 – Ecuador
- Tridysderina yasuni Platnick, Berniker & Bonaldo, 2013 (type) – Ecuador
