= Pseudoscaphiella =

Scientific classification
- Kingdom: Animalia
- Phylum: Arthropoda
- Subphylum: Chelicerata
- Class: Arachnida
- Order: Araneae
- Infraorder: Araneomorphae
- Family: Oonopidae
- Genus: Pseudoscaphiella; Simon, 1907
- Species: P. parasita

Binomial name
- Pseudoscaphiella parasita Simon, 1907

Genus of spiders

Pseudoscaphiella is a monotypic genus of spiders in the family Oonopidae. It was first described in 1907 by Eugène Simon. As of October 2025, it contains only one species, Pseudoscaphiella parasita, endemic to South Africa.
