= Noonops =

Scientific classification
- Domain: Eukaryota
- Kingdom: Animalia
- Phylum: Arthropoda
- Subphylum: Chelicerata
- Class: Arachnida
- Order: Araneae
- Infraorder: Araneomorphae
- Family: Oonopidae
- Genus: Noonops; Berniker

Type species
- Noonops floridanus

Species
- 23, see text

Genus of spiders

Noonops is a genus of spiders in the family Oonopidae. It was first described in 2013 by Platnick & Berniker. As of 2017, it contains 23 species from the U.S., Mexico, and the Bahamas.

== Species ==
Noonops comprises the following species:

- Noonops beattyi Platnick & Berniker, 2013
- Noonops californicus Platnick & Berniker, 2013
- Noonops chapul Platnick & Berniker, 2013
- Noonops chilapensis (Chamberlin & Ivie, 1936)
- Noonops coachella Platnick & Berniker, 2013
- Noonops culiacan Platnick & Berniker, 2013
- Noonops floridanus (Chamberlin & Ivie, 1935)
- Noonops furtivus (Gertsch, 1936)
- Noonops iviei Platnick & Berniker, 2013
- Noonops joshua Platnick & Berniker, 2013
- Noonops mesa Platnick & Berniker, 2013
- Noonops minutus Platnick & Berniker, 2013
- Noonops miraflores Platnick & Berniker, 2013
- Noonops mortero Platnick & Berniker, 2013
- Noonops naci Platnick & Berniker, 2013
- Noonops ocotillo Platnick & Berniker, 2013
- Noonops puebla (Gertsch & Davis, 1942)
- Noonops skinner Platnick & Berniker, 2013
- Noonops sonora (Gertsch & Davis, 1942)
- Noonops tarantula Platnick & Berniker, 2013
- Noonops taxquillo Platnick & Berniker, 2013
- Noonops tonila Platnick & Berniker, 2013
- Noonops willisi Platnick & Berniker, 2013
