= Bidysderina =

Scientific classification
- Domain: Eukaryota
- Kingdom: Animalia
- Phylum: Arthropoda
- Subphylum: Chelicerata
- Class: Arachnida
- Order: Araneae
- Infraorder: Araneomorphae
- Family: Oonopidae
- Genus: Bidysderina al.

Species
- Bidysderina bififa Platnick, Dupérré, Berniker & Bonaldo, 2013; Bidysderina cayambe Platnick, Dupérré, Berniker & Bonaldo, 2013; Bidysderina niarchos Platnick, Dupérré, Berniker & Bonaldo, 2013; Bidysderina perdido Platnick, Dupérré, Berniker & Bonaldo, 2013; Bidysderina wagra Platnick, Dupérré, Berniker & Bonaldo, 2013

Genus of spiders

Bidysderina is a genus of spiders in the family Oonopidae. It was first described in 2013 by Platnick et al.. As of 2016, it contains 5 species, all from Ecuador.
