= Costarina =

Scientific classification
- Kingdom: Animalia
- Phylum: Arthropoda
- Subphylum: Chelicerata
- Class: Arachnida
- Order: Araneae
- Infraorder: Araneomorphae
- Family: Oonopidae
- Genus: Costarina; Dupérré

Type species
- Costarina plena

Species
- 108, see text

Genus of spiders

Costarina is a genus of spiders in the family Oonopidae. It was first described in 2011 by Platnick & Dupérré. As of 2017, it contains 108 species, found in the Americas from Mexico to Brazil.

== Species ==
Costarina comprises the following species:

- Costarina abdita (Chickering, 1968)
- Costarina aguirre Platnick & Berniker, 2014
- Costarina almirante Platnick & Berniker, 2014
- Costarina alturas Platnick & Berniker, 2014
- Costarina anchicaya Platnick & Berniker, 2014
- Costarina antonio Platnick & Berniker, 2014
- Costarina azul Platnick & Berniker, 2014
- Costarina barbilla Platnick & Berniker, 2014
- Costarina belmopan Platnick & Dupérré, 2012
- Costarina blanco Platnick & Dupérré, 2012
- Costarina bocas Platnick & Berniker, 2014
- Costarina bochil Platnick & Dupérré, 2012
- Costarina branstetteri Platnick & Dupérré, 2012
- Costarina cahui Platnick & Dupérré, 2012
- Costarina carara Platnick & Berniker, 2014
- Costarina carrillo Platnick & Berniker, 2014
- Costarina ceiba Platnick & Dupérré, 2012
- Costarina cerere Platnick & Berniker, 2014
- Costarina cerrocol Platnick & Berniker, 2014
- Costarina chiles Platnick & Berniker, 2014
- Costarina chiriqui Platnick & Berniker, 2014
- Costarina choco Platnick & Berniker, 2014
- Costarina chonta Platnick & Berniker, 2014
- Costarina cima Platnick & Berniker, 2014
- Costarina clara Platnick & Berniker, 2014
- Costarina cofradia Platnick & Dupérré, 2012
- Costarina coma Platnick & Dupérré, 2012
- Costarina concinna (Chickering, 1968)
- Costarina cortes Platnick & Dupérré, 2012
- Costarina cruces Platnick & Berniker, 2014
- Costarina cruz Platnick & Berniker, 2014
- Costarina cuerici Platnick & Berniker, 2014
- Costarina cusuco Platnick & Dupérré, 2012
- Costarina diablo Platnick & Berniker, 2014
- Costarina dura (Chickering, 1951)
- Costarina dybasi Platnick & Berniker, 2014
- Costarina elena Platnick & Berniker, 2014
- Costarina espavel Platnick & Berniker, 2014
- Costarina fortuna Platnick & Berniker, 2014
- Costarina frantzius Platnick & Berniker, 2014
- Costarina gemelo Platnick & Berniker, 2014
- Costarina gorgona Platnick & Berniker, 2014
- Costarina gracias Platnick & Dupérré, 2012
- Costarina helechal Platnick & Berniker, 2014
- Costarina hitoy Platnick & Berniker, 2014
- Costarina intempina (Chickering, 1968)
- Costarina isidro Platnick & Berniker, 2014
- Costarina iviei Platnick & Dupérré, 2012
- Costarina izabal Platnick & Dupérré, 2012
- Costarina jimenez Platnick & Berniker, 2014
- Costarina junio Platnick & Berniker, 2014
- Costarina kilambe Platnick & Berniker, 2014
- Costarina leones Platnick & Berniker, 2014
- Costarina llama Platnick & Dupérré, 2012
- Costarina macha Platnick & Dupérré, 2012
- Costarina macho Platnick & Berniker, 2014
- Costarina maritza Platnick & Berniker, 2014
- Costarina meridina (Chickering, 1968)
- Costarina mixtepec Platnick & Dupérré, 2012
- Costarina monte Platnick & Berniker, 2014
- Costarina mooreorum Platnick & Berniker, 2014
- Costarina morales Platnick & Dupérré, 2012
- Costarina muralla Platnick & Dupérré, 2012
- Costarina murphyorum Platnick & Berniker, 2014
- Costarina musun Platnick & Dupérré, 2012
- Costarina naja Platnick & Dupérré, 2012
- Costarina nara Platnick & Berniker, 2014
- Costarina oaxaca Platnick & Dupérré, 2012
- Costarina obtina (Chickering, 1968)
- Costarina olancho Platnick & Dupérré, 2012
- Costarina osa Platnick & Berniker, 2014
- Costarina otun Platnick & Berniker, 2014
- Costarina palmar Platnick & Berniker, 2014
- Costarina parabio Platnick & Berniker, 2014
- Costarina parapalmar Platnick & Berniker, 2014
- Costarina paraplena Platnick & Berniker, 2014
- Costarina penshurst Platnick & Berniker, 2014
- Costarina peten Platnick & Dupérré, 2012
- Costarina pittier Platnick & Berniker, 2014
- Costarina pity Platnick & Berniker, 2014
- Costarina plena (O. Pickard-Cambridge, 1894)
- Costarina poas Platnick & Berniker, 2014
- Costarina quepos Platnick & Berniker, 2014
- Costarina rafael Platnick & Berniker, 2014
- Costarina ramon Platnick & Berniker, 2014
- Costarina recondita (Chickering, 1951)
- Costarina reventazon Platnick & Berniker, 2014
- Costarina saladito Platnick & Berniker, 2014
- Costarina san Platnick & Berniker, 2014
- Costarina sasaima Platnick & Berniker, 2014
- Costarina seclusa (Chickering, 1951)
- Costarina selva Platnick & Berniker, 2014
- Costarina semibio Platnick & Berniker, 2014
- Costarina sepultura Platnick & Dupérré, 2012
- Costarina sorkini Platnick & Berniker, 2014
- Costarina subplena Platnick & Dupérré, 2012
- Costarina suiza Platnick & Berniker, 2014
- Costarina superplena Platnick & Berniker, 2014
- Costarina taraira Platnick & Berniker, 2014
- Costarina tela Platnick & Dupérré, 2012
- Costarina tskui Platnick & Berniker, 2014
- Costarina ubicki Platnick & Berniker, 2014
- Costarina upala Platnick & Berniker, 2014
- Costarina veragua Platnick & Berniker, 2014
- Costarina viejo Platnick & Berniker, 2014
- Costarina waspuk Platnick & Dupérré, 2012
- Costarina watina (Chickering, 1968)
- Costarina yotoco Platnick & Berniker, 2014
