= Megabulbus =

Scientific classification
- Kingdom: Animalia
- Phylum: Arthropoda
- Subphylum: Chelicerata
- Class: Arachnida
- Order: Araneae
- Infraorder: Araneomorphae
- Family: Oonopidae
- Genus: Megabulbus
- Species: M. sansan

Binomial name
- Megabulbus sansan Saaristo, 2007

Genus of spiders

Megabulbus is a genus of spiders in the family Oonopidae. It was first described in 2007 by Saaristo. As of 2017, it contains only one species, Megabulbus sansan, found in Israel.
