= Zyngoonops =

Scientific classification
- Kingdom: Animalia
- Phylum: Arthropoda
- Subphylum: Chelicerata
- Class: Arachnida
- Order: Araneae
- Infraorder: Araneomorphae
- Family: Oonopidae
- Genus: Zyngoonops; Benoit, 1977

Type species
- Z. clandestinus Benoit, 1977

Species
- 10, see text

Genus of spiders

Zyngoonops is a genus of Central African goblin spiders that was first described by P. L. G. Benoit in 1977.

== Species ==
As of June 2019 it contains ten species, found only in the Central African Republic and the Middle Africa:

- Zyngoonops beatriceae Fannes, 2013 – Congo
- Zyngoonops chambersi Fannes, 2013 – Congo
- Zyngoonops clandestinus Benoit, 1977 (type) – Congo
- Zyngoonops goedaerti Fannes, 2013 – Congo
- Zyngoonops marki Fannes, 2013 – Congo
- Zyngoonops moffetti Fannes, 2013 – Congo
- Zyngoonops redii Fannes, 2013 – Congo
- Zyngoonops rockoxi Fannes, 2013 – Congo
- Zyngoonops swammerdami Fannes, 2013 – Congo
- Zyngoonops walcotti Fannes, 2013 – Central African Rep.
