= Termitoonops =

Scientific classification
- Kingdom: Animalia
- Phylum: Arthropoda
- Subphylum: Chelicerata
- Class: Arachnida
- Order: Araneae
- Infraorder: Araneomorphae
- Family: Oonopidae
- Genus: Termitoonops; Benoit

Species
- Termitoonops apicarquieri Benoit, 1975; Termitoonops bouilloni Benoit, 1964; Termitoonops faini Benoit, 1964; Termitoonops furculitermitis Benoit, 1975; Termitoonops spinosissimus Benoit, 1964

Genus of spiders

Termitoonops is a genus of spiders in the family Oonopidae. It was first described in 1964 by Benoit. As of 2016, it contains 5 species, all from Congo.
