= Dysderoides =

Scientific classification
- Kingdom: Animalia
- Phylum: Arthropoda
- Subphylum: Chelicerata
- Class: Arachnida
- Order: Araneae
- Infraorder: Araneomorphae
- Family: Oonopidae
- Genus: Dysderoides; Fage

Type species
- Dysderoides typhlos

Species
- 6, see text

Genus of spiders

Dysderoides is a genus of spiders in the family Oonopidae. It was first described in 1946 by Fage. As of 2017, it contains 6 species, found in Thailand and India.

== Species ==
Dysderoides comprises the following species:

- Dysderoides kaew Grismado & Deeleman, 2014
- Dysderoides kanoi Grismado & Deeleman, 2014
- Dysderoides lawa Grismado & Deeleman, 2014
- Dysderoides muang Grismado & Deeleman, 2014
- Dysderoides synrang Grismado & Deeleman, 2014
- Dysderoides typhlos Fage, 1946
