= Khamiscar =

Scientific classification
- Domain: Eukaryota
- Kingdom: Animalia
- Phylum: Arthropoda
- Subphylum: Chelicerata
- Class: Arachnida
- Order: Araneae
- Infraorder: Araneomorphae
- Family: Oonopidae
- Genus: Khamiscar; Berniker

Type species
- Khamiscar anta

Species
- 6, see text

Genus of spiders

Khamiscar is a genus of spiders in the family Oonopidae. It was first described in 2015 by Platnick & Berniker. As of 2017, it contains 6 species, all found in Madagascar.

== Species ==
Khamiscar comprises the following species:

- Khamiscar ambi Platnick & Berniker, 2015
- Khamiscar anta Platnick & Berniker, 2015
- Khamiscar baly Platnick & Berniker, 2015
- Khamiscar kiri Platnick & Berniker, 2015
- Khamiscar maro Platnick & Berniker, 2015
- Khamiscar tola Platnick & Berniker, 2015
