= Oonopoides =

Scientific classification
- Domain: Eukaryota
- Kingdom: Animalia
- Phylum: Arthropoda
- Subphylum: Chelicerata
- Class: Arachnida
- Order: Araneae
- Infraorder: Araneomorphae
- Family: Oonopidae
- Genus: Oonopoides; Bryant

Type species
- Oonopoides maxillaris

Species
- 22, see text

Genus of spiders

Oonopoides is a genus of spiders in the family Oonopidae. It was first described in 1940 by Bryant. As of 2017, it contains 22 North American species.

== Species ==
Oonopoides comprises the following species:

- Oonopoides anoxus (Chickering, 1970)
- Oonopoides bolivari Dumitrescu & Georgescu, 1987
- Oonopoides cartago Platnick & Berniker, 2013
- Oonopoides catemaco Platnick & Berniker, 2013
- Oonopoides cavernicola Dumitrescu & Georgescu, 1983
- Oonopoides chicanna Platnick & Berniker, 2013
- Oonopoides cristo Platnick & Berniker, 2013
- Oonopoides endicus (Chickering, 1971)
- Oonopoides habanensis Dumitrescu & Georgescu, 1983
- Oonopoides hondo Platnick & Berniker, 2013
- Oonopoides humboldti Dumitrescu & Georgescu, 1983
- Oonopoides iviei Platnick & Berniker, 2013
- Oonopoides kaplanae Platnick & Berniker, 2013
- Oonopoides maxillaris Bryant, 1940
- Oonopoides mitchelli (Gertsch, 1977)
- Oonopoides orghidani Dumitrescu & Georgescu, 1983
- Oonopoides pallidulus (Chickering, 1951)
- Oonopoides pilosus Dumitrescu & Georgescu, 1983
- Oonopoides secretus (Gertsch, 1936)
- Oonopoides singularis Dumitrescu & Georgescu, 1983
- Oonopoides upala Platnick & Berniker, 2013
- Oonopoides zullinii Brignoli, 1974
