= Hypnoonops =

Scientific classification
- Kingdom: Animalia
- Phylum: Arthropoda
- Subphylum: Chelicerata
- Class: Arachnida
- Order: Araneae
- Infraorder: Araneomorphae
- Family: Oonopidae
- Genus: Hypnoonops
- Species: H. lejeunei

Binomial name
- Hypnoonops lejeunei Benoit, 1977

Genus of spiders

Hypnoonops is a genus of spiders in the family Oonopidae. It was first described in 1977 by Benoit. As of 2017, it contains only one species, Hypnoonops lejeunei found in Congo.
