= Simonoonops =

Scientific classification
- Kingdom: Animalia
- Phylum: Arthropoda
- Subphylum: Chelicerata
- Class: Arachnida
- Order: Araneae
- Infraorder: Araneomorphae
- Family: Oonopidae
- Genus: Simonoonops; Harvey

Type species
- Simonoonops craneae

Species
- 11, see text

Genus of spiders

Simonoonops is a genus of spiders in the family Oonopidae. It was first described in 2002 by Harvey. As of 2017, it contains 11 species.

== Species ==
Simonoonops comprises the following species:

- Simonoonops andersoni Platnick & Dupérré, 2011
- Simonoonops chickeringi Platnick & Dupérré, 2011
- Simonoonops craneae (Chickering, 1968)
- Simonoonops etang Platnick & Dupérré, 2011
- Simonoonops globina (Chickering, 1968)
- Simonoonops grande Platnick & Dupérré, 2011
- Simonoonops lutzi Platnick & Dupérré, 2011
- Simonoonops princeps (Simon, 1892)
- Simonoonops simoni Platnick & Dupérré, 2011
- Simonoonops soltina (Chickering, 1968)
- Simonoonops spiniger Simon, 1892
