= Ovobulbus =

Scientific classification
- Kingdom: Animalia
- Phylum: Arthropoda
- Subphylum: Chelicerata
- Class: Arachnida
- Order: Araneae
- Infraorder: Araneomorphae
- Family: Oonopidae
- Genus: Ovobulbus; Saaristo

Species
- Ovobulbus boker Saaristo, 2007 - Israel; Ovobulbus bokerella Saaristo, 2007 - Egypt, Israel; Ovobulbus elot Saaristo, 2007 - Israel

Genus of spiders

Ovobulbus is a genus of spiders in the family Oonopidae. It was first described in 2007 by Saaristo. As of 2016, it contains 3 species found in Egypt and Israel.
