= Paradysderina =

Scientific classification
- Domain: Eukaryota
- Kingdom: Animalia
- Phylum: Arthropoda
- Subphylum: Chelicerata
- Class: Arachnida
- Order: Araneae
- Infraorder: Araneomorphae
- Family: Oonopidae
- Genus: Paradysderina; Dupérré

Type species
- Paradysderina watrousi

Species
- 54, see text

Genus of spiders

Paradysderina is a genus of spiders in the family Oonopidae. It was first described in 2011 by Platnick & Dupérré. As of 2017, it contains 54 species from South America.

== Species ==
Paradysderina comprises the following species:

- Paradysderina apurimac Platnick & Dupérré, 2011
- Paradysderina asymmetrica Platnick & Dupérré, 2011
- Paradysderina baehrae Platnick & Dupérré, 2011
- Paradysderina bagua Platnick & Dupérré, 2011
- Paradysderina boyaca Platnick & Dupérré, 2011
- Paradysderina carpish Platnick & Dupérré, 2011
- Paradysderina carrizal Platnick & Dupérré, 2011
- Paradysderina centro Platnick & Dupérré, 2011
- Paradysderina chinacota Platnick & Dupérré, 2011
- Paradysderina chingaza Platnick & Dupérré, 2011
- Paradysderina consuelo Platnick & Dupérré, 2011
- Paradysderina convencion Platnick & Dupérré, 2011
- Paradysderina dracula Platnick & Dupérré, 2011
- Paradysderina excavata Platnick & Dupérré, 2011
- Paradysderina fatima Platnick & Dupérré, 2011
- Paradysderina fusiscuta Platnick & Dupérré, 2011
- Paradysderina globosa (Keyserling, 1877)
- Paradysderina hermani Platnick & Dupérré, 2011
- Paradysderina huila Platnick & Dupérré, 2011
- Paradysderina imir Platnick & Dupérré, 2011
- Paradysderina lefty Platnick & Dupérré, 2011
- Paradysderina leticia Platnick & Dupérré, 2011
- Paradysderina loreto Platnick & Dupérré, 2011
- Paradysderina lostayos Platnick & Dupérré, 2011
- Paradysderina macho Platnick & Dupérré, 2011
- Paradysderina maldonado Platnick & Dupérré, 2011
- Paradysderina malkini Platnick & Dupérré, 2011
- Paradysderina monstrosa Platnick & Dupérré, 2011
- Paradysderina montana (Keyserling, 1883)
- Paradysderina newtoni Platnick & Dupérré, 2011
- Paradysderina pecki Platnick & Dupérré, 2011
- Paradysderina pinzoni Platnick & Dupérré, 2011
- Paradysderina pira Platnick & Dupérré, 2011
- Paradysderina pithecia Platnick & Dupérré, 2011
- Paradysderina piura Platnick & Dupérré, 2011
- Paradysderina puyo Platnick & Dupérré, 2011
- Paradysderina righty Platnick & Dupérré, 2011
- Paradysderina rothae Platnick & Dupérré, 2011
- Paradysderina sauce Platnick & Dupérré, 2011
- Paradysderina schizo Platnick & Dupérré, 2011
- Paradysderina silvae Platnick & Dupérré, 2011
- Paradysderina sucumbios Platnick & Dupérré, 2011
- Paradysderina tabaconas Platnick & Dupérré, 2011
- Paradysderina tambo Platnick & Dupérré, 2011
- Paradysderina tambopata Platnick & Dupérré, 2011
- Paradysderina thayerae Platnick & Dupérré, 2011
- Paradysderina vaupes Platnick & Dupérré, 2011
- Paradysderina vlad Platnick & Dupérré, 2011
- Paradysderina watrousi Platnick & Dupérré, 2011
- Paradysderina wygodzinskyi Platnick & Dupérré, 2011
- Paradysderina yanayacu Platnick & Dupérré, 2011
- Paradysderina yasua Platnick & Dupérré, 2011
- Paradysderina yasuni Platnick & Dupérré, 2011
- Paradysderina zamora Platnick & Dupérré, 2011
