= Gradunguloonops =

Scientific classification
- Kingdom: Animalia
- Phylum: Arthropoda
- Subphylum: Chelicerata
- Class: Arachnida
- Order: Araneae
- Infraorder: Araneomorphae
- Family: Oonopidae
- Genus: Gradunguloonops al.

Type species
- Gradunguloonops mutum

Species
- 12, see text

Genus of spiders

Gradunguloonops is a genus of spiders in the family Oonopidae. It was first described in 2015 by Grismado et al.. As of 2017, it contains 12 South American species.

== Species ==
Gradunguloonops comprises the following species:

- Gradunguloonops amazonicus Grismado, Izquierdo, González M. & Ramírez, 2015
- Gradunguloonops benavidesae Grismado, Izquierdo, González M. & Ramírez, 2015
- Gradunguloonops bonaldoi Grismado, Izquierdo, González M. & Ramírez, 2015
- Gradunguloonops erwini Grismado, Izquierdo, González M. & Ramírez, 2015
- Gradunguloonops florezi Grismado, Izquierdo, González M. & Ramírez, 2015
- Gradunguloonops juruti Grismado, Izquierdo, González M. & Ramírez, 2015
- Gradunguloonops mutum Grismado, Izquierdo, González M. & Ramírez, 2015
- Gradunguloonops nadineae Grismado, Izquierdo, González M. & Ramírez, 2015
- Gradunguloonops orellana Grismado, Izquierdo, González M. & Ramírez, 2015
- Gradunguloonops pacanari Grismado, Izquierdo, González M. & Ramírez, 2015
- Gradunguloonops raptor Grismado, Izquierdo, González M. & Ramírez, 2015
- Gradunguloonops urucu Grismado, Izquierdo, González M. & Ramírez, 2015
