= Camptoscaphiella =

Scientific classification
- Kingdom: Animalia
- Phylum: Arthropoda
- Subphylum: Chelicerata
- Class: Arachnida
- Order: Araneae
- Infraorder: Araneomorphae
- Family: Oonopidae
- Genus: Camptoscaphiella; Caporiacco

Type species
- Camptoscaphiella fulva

Species
- 18, see text

Genus of spiders

Camptoscaphiella is a genus of spiders in the family Oonopidae. It was first described in 1934 by Caporiacco. As of 2017, it contains 18 Asian species.

== Species ==
Camptoscaphiella comprises the following species:

- Camptoscaphiella fulva Caporiacco, 1934
- Camptoscaphiella glenniei (Fage, 1946)
- Camptoscaphiella gunsa Baehr, 2010
- Camptoscaphiella hilaris Brignoli, 1978
- Camptoscaphiella loebli Baehr, 2010
- Camptoscaphiella martensi Baehr, 2010
- Camptoscaphiella monteithi Baehr & Harvey, 2013
- Camptoscaphiella nepalensis Baehr, 2010
- Camptoscaphiella panchthar Baehr, 2010
- Camptoscaphiella paquini Ubick, 2010
- Camptoscaphiella potteri Baehr & Harvey, 2013
- Camptoscaphiella schwendingeri Baehr, 2010
- Camptoscaphiella silens Brignoli, 1976
- Camptoscaphiella simoni Baehr, 2010
- Camptoscaphiella sinensis Deeleman-Reinhold, 1995
- Camptoscaphiella strepens Brignoli, 1976
- Camptoscaphiella taplejung Baehr, 2010
- Camptoscaphiella tuberans Tong & Li, 2007
