= Blanioonops =

Scientific classification
- Kingdom: Animalia
- Phylum: Arthropoda
- Subphylum: Chelicerata
- Class: Arachnida
- Order: Araneae
- Infraorder: Araneomorphae
- Family: Oonopidae
- Genus: Blanioonops; Simon & Fage
- Species: B. patellaris

Binomial name
- Blanioonops patellaris Simon & Fage, 1922

Genus of spiders

Blanioonops is a genus of spiders in the family Oonopidae. It was first described in 1922 by Eugène Simon and Louis Fage. As of 2016, it contained only one species, Blanioonops patellaris, found in East Africa.

== Description ==
The male is unknown. The female has a cephalothorax that is 1.5 times as long as it is wide and weakly convex dorsally. It has no eyes. It is about 1 mm long. The cephalothorax, appendages and sternum are tawny. The abdomen is whitish. The dorsal side of the chelicerae is adorned with a series of simple hairs with a row of feathery, thick hairs.
