= Promolotra =

Scientific classification
- Kingdom: Animalia
- Phylum: Arthropoda
- Subphylum: Chelicerata
- Class: Arachnida
- Order: Araneae
- Infraorder: Araneomorphae
- Family: Oonopidae
- Genus: Promolotra; Tong & Li, 2020

Type species
- P. shankhaung Tong & Li, 2020

Species
- Promolotra hponkanrazi Tong & Li, 2020; Promolotra shankhaung Tong & Li, 2020

Genus of spiders

Promolotra is a small genus of southeast Asian goblin spiders. It was first described by Y. F. Tong and S. Q. Li in 2020, and it has only been found in Myanmar. As of March 2022 it contains only two species: P. hponkanrazi and P. shankhaung.
