= Birabenella =

Scientific classification
- Domain: Eukaryota
- Kingdom: Animalia
- Phylum: Arthropoda
- Subphylum: Chelicerata
- Class: Arachnida
- Order: Araneae
- Infraorder: Araneomorphae
- Family: Oonopidae
- Genus: Birabenella; Grismado, 2010

Type species
- Birabenella homonota Grismado, 2010

Species
- 7, see text

Genus of spiders

Birabenella is a genus of spiders in the family Oonopidae. It was first described in 2010 by Grismado.

== Species ==
As of September 2022 it contains seven species, found in South America:

- Birabenella argentina (Birabén, 1955) – Argentina
- Birabenella chincha Piacentini, Grismado & Ramírez, 2017 – Peru
- Birabenella elqui Grismado, 2010 – Chile
- Birabenella homonota Grismado, 2010 (type) – Chile
- Birabenella kamanchaca Piacentini, Grismado & Ramírez, 2017 – Chile
- Birabenella pizarroi Grismado, 2010 – Chile
- Birabenella portai Piacentini, Grismado & Ramírez, 2017 – Argentina
