= Tolegnaro =

Scientific classification
- Kingdom: Animalia
- Phylum: Arthropoda
- Subphylum: Chelicerata
- Class: Arachnida
- Order: Araneae
- Infraorder: Araneomorphae
- Family: Oonopidae
- Genus: Tolegnaro; Griswold

Species
- Tolegnaro kepleri Álvarez-Padilla, Ubick & Griswold, 2012; Tolegnaro sagani Álvarez-Padilla, Ubick & Griswold, 2012

Genus of spiders

Tolegnaro is a genus of spiders in the family Oonopidae. It was first described in 2012 by Álvarez-Padilla, Ubick & Griswold. As of 2016, it contains 2 species, both found in Madagascar.
