= Niarchos (spider) =

Scientific classification
- Kingdom: Animalia
- Phylum: Arthropoda
- Subphylum: Chelicerata
- Class: Arachnida
- Order: Araneae
- Infraorder: Araneomorphae
- Family: Oonopidae
- Genus: Niarchos; Platnick & Dupérré, 2010

Type species
- N. cotopaxi Platnick & Dupérré, 2010

Species
- 23, see text

Genus of spiders

Niarchos is a genus of South American goblin spiders first described by Norman I. Platnick & N. Dupérré in 2010.

== Species ==
As of April 2019 it contains twenty-three species:

- Niarchos baehrae Platnick & Dupérré, 2010 — Ecuador
- Niarchos barragani Platnick & Dupérré, 2010 — Ecuador
- Niarchos bonaldoi Platnick & Dupérré, 2010 — Ecuador
- Niarchos cotopaxi Platnick & Dupérré, 2010 — Ecuador
- Niarchos elicioi Platnick & Dupérré, 2010 — Ecuador
- Niarchos facundoi Platnick & Dupérré, 2010 — Ecuador
- Niarchos florezi Platnick & Dupérré, 2010 — Colombia
- Niarchos foreroi Platnick & Dupérré, 2010 — Ecuador
- Niarchos grismadoi Platnick & Dupérré, 2010 — Ecuador
- Niarchos keili Platnick & Dupérré, 2010 — Ecuador
- Niarchos ligiae Platnick & Dupérré, 2010 — Ecuador
- Niarchos loja Platnick & Dupérré, 2010 — Ecuador, Peru
- Niarchos matiasi Platnick & Dupérré, 2010 — Ecuador
- Niarchos michaliki Platnick & Dupérré, 2010 — Ecuador
- Niarchos normani Dupérré & Tapia, 2017 — Ecuador
- Niarchos palenque Platnick & Dupérré, 2010 — Ecuador
- Niarchos ramirezi Platnick & Dupérré, 2010 — Ecuador
- Niarchos rheimsae Platnick & Dupérré, 2010 — Ecuador
- Niarchos santosi Platnick & Dupérré, 2010 — Ecuador
- Niarchos scutatus Platnick & Dupérré, 2010 — Ecuador
- Niarchos tapiai Platnick & Dupérré, 2010 — Ecuador
- Niarchos vegai Platnick & Dupérré, 2010 — Ecuador
- Niarchos wygodzinskyi Platnick & Dupérré, 2010 — Colombia
