= Sulsula =

Scientific classification
- Domain: Eukaryota
- Kingdom: Animalia
- Phylum: Arthropoda
- Subphylum: Chelicerata
- Class: Arachnida
- Order: Araneae
- Infraorder: Araneomorphae
- Family: Oonopidae
- Genus: Sulsula
- Species: S. pauper

Binomial name
- Sulsula pauper (O. Pickard-Cambridge, 1876)

Genus of spiders

Sulsula is a genus of spiders in the family Oonopidae. It was first described in 1882 by Simon. As of 2017, it contains only one species, Sulsula pauper, found in Algeria, Egypt, and Sudan.
