= Pelicinus =

Scientific classification
- Kingdom: Animalia
- Phylum: Arthropoda
- Subphylum: Chelicerata
- Class: Arachnida
- Order: Araneae
- Infraorder: Araneomorphae
- Family: Oonopidae
- Genus: Pelicinus; Simon

Type species
- Pelicinus marmoratus

Species
- 21, see text

Genus of spiders

Pelicinus is a genus of spiders in the family Oonopidae. It was first described in 1892 by Simon. As of 2022, it contains 21 species.

== Species ==
Pelicinus comprises the following species:

- Pelicinus amrishi (Makhan & Ezzatpanah, 2011) — Iran
- Pelicinus churchillae Platnick, Dupérré, Ott, Baehr & Kranz-Baltensperger, 2012 — Solomon Is.
- Pelicinus damieu Platnick, Dupérré, Ott, Baehr & Kranz-Baltensperger, 2012 — New Caledonia
- Pelicinus deelemanae Platnick, Dupérré, Ott, Baehr & Kranz-Baltensperger, 2012 — Thailand
- Pelicinus duong Platnick, Dupérré, Ott, Baehr & Kranz-Baltensperger, 2012 — Vietnam
- Pelicinus johor Platnick, Dupérré, Ott, Baehr & Kranz-Baltensperger, 2012 — Malaysia
- Pelicinus khao Platnick, Dupérré, Ott, Baehr & Kranz-Baltensperger, 2012 — Thailand
- Pelicinus koghis Platnick, Dupérré, Ott, Baehr & Kranz-Baltensperger, 2012 — New Caledonia
- Pelicinus lachivala Platnick, Dupérré, Ott, Baehr & Kranz-Baltensperger, 2012 — India
- Pelicinus madurai Platnick, Dupérré, Ott, Baehr & Kranz-Baltensperger, 2012 — India
- Pelicinus marmoratus Simon, 1892 (type) — Tropical Asia. Introduced to Pacific Is., Caribbean, Brazil, Canary Is., Kenya, Seychelles
- Pelicinus monteithi Platnick, Dupérré, Ott, Baehr & Kranz-Baltensperger, 2012 — New Caledonia
- Pelicinus penang Platnick, Dupérré, Ott, Baehr & Kranz-Baltensperger, 2012 — Malaysia
- Pelicinus raveni Platnick, Dupérré, Ott, Baehr & Kranz-Baltensperger, 2012 — Fiji
- Pelicinus saaristoi Ott & Harvey, 2008 — Australia (Western Australia)
- Pelicinus sayam Platnick, Dupérré, Ott, Baehr & Kranz-Baltensperger, 2012 — Thailand
- Pelicinus schwendingeri Platnick, Dupérré, Ott, Baehr & Kranz-Baltensperger, 2012 — Thailand, China
- Pelicinus sengleti Platnick, Dupérré, Ott, Baehr & Kranz-Baltensperger, 2012 — Iran
- Pelicinus snooky Ranasinghe & Benjamin, 2018 — Sri Lanka
- Pelicinus tham Platnick, Dupérré, Ott, Baehr & Kranz-Baltensperger, 2012 — Laos
- Pelicinus tumpy Ranasinghe & Benjamin, 2018 — Sri Lanka
