= Grymeus =

Scientific classification
- Domain: Eukaryota
- Kingdom: Animalia
- Phylum: Arthropoda
- Subphylum: Chelicerata
- Class: Arachnida
- Order: Araneae
- Infraorder: Araneomorphae
- Family: Oonopidae
- Genus: Grymeus; Harvey, 1987

Species
- G. barbatus Harvey, 1987; G. robertsi Harvey, 1987; G. yanga Harvey, 1987

Genus of spiders

Grymeus is a tiny genus of goblin spiders that is found in Australia. They live in leaf litter and under tree bark.
