= Plectoptilus =

Scientific classification
- Kingdom: Animalia
- Phylum: Arthropoda
- Subphylum: Chelicerata
- Class: Arachnida
- Order: Araneae
- Infraorder: Araneomorphae
- Family: Oonopidae
- Genus: Plectoptilus
- Species: P. myops

Binomial name
- Plectoptilus myops Simon, 1905

Genus of spiders

Plectoptilus is a genus of spiders in the family Oonopidae. It was first described in 1905 by Simon. As of 2017, it contains only one species, Plectoptilus myops, found on Java.
