= Cortestina =

Scientific classification
- Domain: Eukaryota
- Kingdom: Animalia
- Phylum: Arthropoda
- Subphylum: Chelicerata
- Class: Arachnida
- Order: Araneae
- Infraorder: Araneomorphae
- Family: Oonopidae
- Genus: Cortestina
- Species: C. thaleri

Binomial name
- Cortestina thaleri Knoflach, 2009

Genus of spiders

Cortestina is a genus of spiders in the family Oonopidae. It was first described in 2009 by Knoflach. As of 2017, it contains only one species, Cortestina thaleri, found in Austria and Italy.
