= Hexapopha =

Scientific classification
- Kingdom: Animalia
- Phylum: Arthropoda
- Subphylum: Chelicerata
- Class: Arachnida
- Order: Araneae
- Infraorder: Araneomorphae
- Family: Oonopidae
- Genus: Hexapopha; Platnick, Berniker & Víquez, 2014

Type species
- Hexapopha reimoseri (Fage, 1938)

Species
- 41, see text

Genus of spiders

Hexapopha is a genus of spiders in the family Oonopidae. It was first described in 2014 by Platnick, Berniker & Víquez.

== Species ==
As of August 2023 it contains forty-one species:

- Hexapopha baehrae Feitosa, Ott & Bonaldo, 2023 — Brazil
- Hexapopha brasiliana (Bristowe, 1938) — Brazil
- Hexapopha brescoviti Feitosa, Ott & Bonaldo, 2023 — Brazil
- Hexapopha caboquinho Feitosa, Ott & Bonaldo, 2023 — Brazil
- Hexapopha corniculata Feitosa, Ott & Bonaldo, 2023 — Brazil
- Hexapopha delta Feitosa, Ott & Bonaldo, 2023 — Brazil
- Hexapopha depleta Feitosa, Ott & Bonaldo, 2023 — Brazil
- Hexapopha egua Feitosa, Ott & Bonaldo, 2023 — Brazil
- Hexapopha erebai Feitosa, Ott & Bonaldo, 2023 — Brazil
- Hexapopha excavata Feitosa, Ott & Bonaldo, 2023 — Brazil
- Hexapopha fannesi Feitosa, Ott & Bonaldo, 2023 — Brazil
- Hexapopha grismadoi Feitosa, Ott & Bonaldo, 2023 — Brazil
- Hexapopha gunma Feitosa, Ott & Bonaldo, 2023 — Brazil
- Hexapopha harveyi Feitosa, Ott & Bonaldo, 2023 — Brazil
- Hexapopha hone Platnick, Berniker & Víquez, 2014 — Costa Rica
- Hexapopha ilhoa Feitosa, Ott & Bonaldo, 2023 — Brazil
- Hexapopha itabaiana Feitosa, Ott & Bonaldo, 2023 — Brazil
- Hexapopha izquierdoi Feitosa, Ott & Bonaldo, 2023 — Brazil
- Hexapopha jimenez Platnick, Berniker & Víquez, 2014 — Costa Rica
- Hexapopha kropfi Feitosa, Ott & Bonaldo, 2023 — Brazil
- Hexapopha m-scripta (Birabén, 1954) — Argentina
- Hexapopha manauara Feitosa, Ott & Bonaldo, 2023 — Brazil
- Hexapopha marajoara Feitosa, Ott & Bonaldo, 2023 — Brazil
- Hexapopha numerosa Feitosa, Ott & Bonaldo, 2023 — Brazil
- Hexapopha osa Platnick, Berniker & Víquez, 2014 — Costa Rica
- Hexapopha pantaneira Feitosa, Ott & Bonaldo, 2023 — Brazil
- Hexapopha peba Feitosa, Ott & Bonaldo, 2023 — Brazil
- Hexapopha periclitata Feitosa, Ott & Bonaldo, 2023 — Brazil
- Hexapopha pithecia Feitosa, Ott & Bonaldo, 2023 — Peru
- Hexapopha platnicki Feitosa, Ott & Bonaldo, 2023 — Brazil
- Hexapopha quadraginta Feitosa, Ott & Bonaldo, 2023 — Brazil
- Hexapopha ramirezi Feitosa, Ott & Bonaldo, 2023 — Brazil
- Hexapopha reimoseri (Fage, 1938) (type) — Costa Rica
- Hexapopha rheimsae Feitosa, Ott & Bonaldo, 2023 — Brazil
- Hexapopha ruizi Feitosa, Ott & Bonaldo, 2023 — Brazil
- Hexapopha santosi Feitosa, Ott & Bonaldo, 2023 — Brazil
- Hexapopha sorkini Feitosa, Ott & Bonaldo, 2023 — Venezuela
- Hexapopha tallitae Feitosa, Ott & Bonaldo, 2023 — Brazil
- Hexapopha ubicki Feitosa, Ott & Bonaldo, 2023 — Brazil
- Hexapopha una Feitosa, Ott & Bonaldo, 2023 — Brazil
- Hexapopha wangi Feitosa, Ott & Bonaldo, 2023 — Brazil
