= Volborattella =

Scientific classification
- Domain: Eukaryota
- Kingdom: Animalia
- Phylum: Arthropoda
- Subphylum: Chelicerata
- Class: Arachnida
- Order: Araneae
- Infraorder: Araneomorphae
- Family: Oonopidae
- Genus: Volborattella; Ubick

Species
- Volborattella guenevera Saucedo, Ubick & Griswold, 2015; Volborattella nasario Saucedo, Ubick & Griswold, 2015; Volborattella paulyi Saucedo, Ubick & Griswold, 2015; Volborattella teresae Saucedo, Ubick & Griswold, 2015; Volborattella toliara Saucedo, Ubick & Griswold, 2015

Genus of spiders

Volborattella is a genus of spiders in the family Oonopidae. It was first described in 2015 by Saucedo & Ubick. As of 2016, it contains 5 species, all of Madagascar.
