= Pescennina =

Scientific classification
- Kingdom: Animalia
- Phylum: Arthropoda
- Subphylum: Chelicerata
- Class: Arachnida
- Order: Araneae
- Infraorder: Araneomorphae
- Family: Oonopidae
- Genus: Pescennina; Simon

Type species
- Pescennina epularis

Species
- 18, see text

Genus of spiders

Pescennina is a genus of spiders in the family Oonopidae. It was first described in 1903 by Simon. As of 2017, it contains 18 species.

== Species ==
Pescennina comprises the following species:

- Pescennina arborea Platnick & Dupérré, 2011
- Pescennina cupida (Keyserling, 1881)
- Pescennina epularis Simon, 1903
- Pescennina fusca Platnick & Dupérré, 2011
- Pescennina gertschi Platnick & Dupérré, 2011
- Pescennina grismadoi Platnick & Dupérré, 2011
- Pescennina ibarrai Platnick & Dupérré, 2011
- Pescennina iviei Platnick & Dupérré, 2011
- Pescennina laselva Platnick & Dupérré, 2011
- Pescennina loreto Platnick & Dupérré, 2011
- Pescennina magdalena Platnick & Dupérré, 2011
- Pescennina murphyorum Platnick & Dupérré, 2011
- Pescennina orellana Platnick & Dupérré, 2011
- Pescennina otti Platnick & Dupérré, 2011
- Pescennina piura Platnick & Dupérré, 2011
- Pescennina sasaima Platnick & Dupérré, 2011
- Pescennina sumidero Platnick & Dupérré, 2011
- Pescennina viquezi Platnick & Dupérré, 2011
