= Reductoonops =

Scientific classification
- Domain: Eukaryota
- Kingdom: Animalia
- Phylum: Arthropoda
- Subphylum: Chelicerata
- Class: Arachnida
- Order: Araneae
- Infraorder: Araneomorphae
- Family: Oonopidae
- Genus: Reductoonops; Berniker

Type species
- Reductoonops yasuni

Species
- 34, see text

Genus of spiders

Reductoonops is a genus of spiders in the family Oonopidae. It was first described in 2014 by Platnick & Berniker. All four posterior eyes have been lost in this genus, with most species having only two eyes.As of 2017, it contains 34 species.

== Species ==
Reductoonops comprises the following species:

- Reductoonops almirante Platnick & Berniker, 2014
- Reductoonops armeria Platnick & Berniker, 2014
- Reductoonops bayano Platnick & Berniker, 2014
- Reductoonops carpish Platnick & Berniker, 2014
- Reductoonops celica Platnick & Berniker, 2014
- Reductoonops chamela Platnick & Berniker, 2014
- Reductoonops diamant Platnick & Berniker, 2014
- Reductoonops domingo Platnick & Berniker, 2014
- Reductoonops elqui Platnick & Berniker, 2014
- Reductoonops escopeta Platnick & Berniker, 2014
- Reductoonops ferry Platnick & Berniker, 2014
- Reductoonops hato Platnick & Berniker, 2014
- Reductoonops hedlite Platnick & Berniker, 2014
- Reductoonops jabin Platnick & Berniker, 2014
- Reductoonops jatun Platnick & Berniker, 2014
- Reductoonops leticia Platnick & Berniker, 2014
- Reductoonops lucha Platnick & Berniker, 2014
- Reductoonops marta Platnick & Berniker, 2014
- Reductoonops meta Platnick & Berniker, 2014
- Reductoonops molleturo Platnick & Berniker, 2014
- Reductoonops monte Platnick & Berniker, 2014
- Reductoonops naci Platnick & Berniker, 2014
- Reductoonops napo Platnick & Berniker, 2014
- Reductoonops niltepec Platnick & Berniker, 2014
- Reductoonops nubes Platnick & Berniker, 2014
- Reductoonops otonga Platnick & Berniker, 2014
- Reductoonops palenque Platnick & Berniker, 2014
- Reductoonops pichincha Platnick & Berniker, 2014
- Reductoonops pinta Platnick & Berniker, 2014
- Reductoonops real Platnick & Berniker, 2014
- Reductoonops sasaima Platnick & Berniker, 2014
- Reductoonops tandapi Platnick & Berniker, 2014
- Reductoonops tina Platnick & Berniker, 2014
- Reductoonops yasuni Platnick & Berniker, 2014
