= Molotra =

Scientific classification
- Kingdom: Animalia
- Phylum: Arthropoda
- Subphylum: Chelicerata
- Class: Arachnida
- Order: Araneae
- Infraorder: Araneomorphae
- Family: Oonopidae
- Genus: Molotra; Griswold

Type species
- Molotra molotra

Species
- 6, see text

Genus of spiders

Molotra is a genus of spiders in the family Oonopidae. It was first described in 2011 by Ubick & Griswold. As of 2017, it contains 6 species, all from Madagascar.

== Species ==
Molotra comprises the following species:

- Molotra katarinae Ubick & Griswold, 2011
- Molotra milloti Ubick & Griswold, 2011
- Molotra molotra Ubick & Griswold, 2011
- Molotra ninae Ubick & Griswold, 2011
- Molotra suzannae Ubick & Griswold, 2011
- Molotra tsingy Ubick & Griswold, 2011
