= Cousinea =

Scientific classification
- Kingdom: Animalia
- Phylum: Arthropoda
- Subphylum: Chelicerata
- Class: Arachnida
- Order: Araneae
- Infraorder: Araneomorphae
- Family: Oonopidae
- Genus: Cousinea
- Species: C. keeleyi

Binomial name
- Cousinea keeleyi Saaristo, 2001

Genus of spiders

Cousinea is a genus of spiders in the family Oonopidae. It was first described in 2001 by Saaristo. As of 2017, it contains only one species, Cousinea keeleyi, found in the Seychelles.
