= Antoonops =

Scientific classification
- Kingdom: Animalia
- Phylum: Arthropoda
- Subphylum: Chelicerata
- Class: Arachnida
- Order: Araneae
- Infraorder: Araneomorphae
- Family: Oonopidae
- Genus: Antoonops; Jocqué

Type species
- Antoonops corbulo

Species
- 6, see text

Genus of spiders

Antoonops is a genus of spiders in the family Oonopidae first described in 2008 by Fannes & Jocqué. As of 2017, it contains 6 species.

== Species ==
Antoonops comprises the following species:

- Antoonops bouaflensis Fannes & Jocqué, 2008 - Ivory Coast
- Antoonops corbulo Fannes & Jocqué, 2008 - Ivory Coast, Ghana
- Antoonops iita Fannes & Jocqué, 2008 - Nigeria
- Antoonops kamieli Fannes, 2013 - Ivory Coast
- Antoonops nebula Fannes & Jocqué, 2008 - Ghana
- Antoonops sarae Fannes, 2013 - Cameroon
