= Varioonops =

Scientific classification
- Kingdom: Animalia
- Phylum: Arthropoda
- Subphylum: Chelicerata
- Class: Arachnida
- Order: Araneae
- Infraorder: Araneomorphae
- Family: Oonopidae
- Genus: Varioonops; Bolzern & Platnick, 2013

Type species
- V. cafista Bolzern & Platnick, 2013

Species
- 23, see text

Genus of spiders

Varioonops is a genus of goblin spiders that was first described by A. Bolzern & Norman I. Platnick in 2013.

== Species ==
As of June 2019 it contains twenty-three species, found in Colombia, Venezuela, Panama, and Costa Rica:

- Varioonops cafista Bolzern & Platnick, 2013 (type) – Costa Rica
- Varioonops cerrado Bolzern & Platnick, 2013 – Panama
- Varioonops chordio Bolzern & Platnick, 2013 – Venezuela
- Varioonops edvardi Bolzern & Platnick, 2013 – Colombia
- Varioonops funator Bolzern & Platnick, 2013 – Panama
- Varioonops girven Bolzern & Platnick, 2013 – Costa Rica
- Varioonops grancho Bolzern & Platnick, 2013 – Venezuela
- Varioonops heredia Bolzern & Platnick, 2013 – Costa Rica
- Varioonops montesta Bolzern & Platnick, 2013 – Costa Rica
- Varioonops parlata Bolzern & Platnick, 2013 – Venezuela
- Varioonops pittieri Bolzern & Platnick, 2013 – Venezuela
- Varioonops poas Bolzern & Platnick, 2013 – Costa Rica
- Varioonops potaguo Bolzern & Platnick, 2013 – Venezuela
- Varioonops ramila Bolzern & Platnick, 2013 – Costa Rica, Panama
- Varioonops sansidro Bolzern & Platnick, 2013 – Costa Rica, Panama
- Varioonops sinesama Bolzern & Platnick, 2013 – Colombia
- Varioonops spatharum Bolzern & Platnick, 2013 – Costa Rica
- Varioonops tortuguero Bolzern & Platnick, 2013 – Costa Rica
- Varioonops trujillo Bolzern & Platnick, 2013 – Venezuela
- Varioonops varablanca Bolzern & Platnick, 2013 – Costa Rica
- Varioonops velsala Bolzern & Platnick, 2013 – Costa Rica
- Varioonops veragua Bolzern & Platnick, 2013 – Costa Rica
- Varioonops yacambu Bolzern & Platnick, 2013 – Venezuela
