= Xyccarph =

Scientific classification
- Kingdom: Animalia
- Phylum: Arthropoda
- Subphylum: Chelicerata
- Class: Arachnida
- Order: Araneae
- Infraorder: Araneomorphae
- Family: Oonopidae
- Genus: Xyccarph; Brignoli, 1978

Type species
- X. myops Brignoli, 1978

Species
- 4, see text

Genus of spiders

Xyccarph is a genus of Brazilian goblin spiders that was first described by Paolo Marcello Brignoli in 1978.

== Species ==
As of June 2019 it contains four species, found only in Brazil:

- Xyccarph migrans Höfer & Brescovit, 1996 – Brazil
- Xyccarph myops Brignoli, 1978 (type) – Brazil
- Xyccarph tenuis (Vellard, 1924) – Brazil
- Xyccarph wellingtoni Höfer & Brescovit, 1996 – Brazil
