= Semidysderina =

Scientific classification
- Domain: Eukaryota
- Kingdom: Animalia
- Phylum: Arthropoda
- Subphylum: Chelicerata
- Class: Arachnida
- Order: Araneae
- Infraorder: Araneomorphae
- Family: Oonopidae
- Genus: Semidysderina; Dupérré

Type species
- Semidysderina lagila

Species
- 6, see text

Genus of spiders

Semidysderina is a genus of spiders in the family Oonopidae. It was first described in 2011 by Platnick & Dupérré. As of 2017, it contains 6 species, all found in Colombia.

== Species ==
Semidysderina comprises the following species:

- Semidysderina donachui Platnick & Dupérré, 2011
- Semidysderina kochalkai Platnick & Dupérré, 2011
- Semidysderina lagila Platnick & Dupérré, 2011
- Semidysderina marta Platnick & Dupérré, 2011
- Semidysderina mulleri Platnick & Dupérré, 2011
- Semidysderina sturmi Platnick & Dupérré, 2011
