= Guatemoonops =

Scientific classification
- Domain: Eukaryota
- Kingdom: Animalia
- Phylum: Arthropoda
- Subphylum: Chelicerata
- Class: Arachnida
- Order: Araneae
- Infraorder: Araneomorphae
- Family: Oonopidae
- Genus: Guatemoonops; Berniker

Type species
- Guatemoonops purulha

Species
- 6, see text

Genus of spiders

Guatemoonops is a genus of spiders in the family Oonopidae. It was first described in 2015 by Bolzern, Platnick & Berniker. As of 2017, it contains 6 species, from Guatemala and Mexico.

== Species ==
Guatemoonops comprises the following species:

- Guatemoonops augustin Bolzern, Platnick & Berniker, 2015
- Guatemoonops chilasco Bolzern, Platnick & Berniker, 2015
- Guatemoonops jaba Bolzern, Platnick & Berniker, 2015
- Guatemoonops purulha Bolzern, Platnick & Berniker, 2015
- Guatemoonops rhino Bolzern, Platnick & Berniker, 2015
- Guatemoonops zacapa Bolzern, Platnick & Berniker, 2015
