= Scaphioides =

Scientific classification
- Domain: Eukaryota
- Kingdom: Animalia
- Phylum: Arthropoda
- Subphylum: Chelicerata
- Class: Arachnida
- Order: Araneae
- Infraorder: Araneomorphae
- Family: Oonopidae
- Genus: Scaphioides; Bryant, 1942

Type species
- Scaphioides reducta Bryant, 1942

Species
- 19, see text

Genus of spiders

Scaphioides is a genus of spiders in the family Oonopidae. It was first described in 1942 by Elizabeth B. Bryant.

== Species ==
As of September 2022, the World Spider Catalog accepts the following nineteen species:

- Scaphioides bimini Platnick & Dupérré, 2012 — Bahama Is.
- Scaphioides camaguey Platnick & Dupérré, 2012 — Cuba
- Scaphioides campeche Platnick & Dupérré, 2012 — Mexico
- Scaphioides cletus (Chickering, 1969) — Jamaica
- Scaphioides cobre Platnick & Dupérré, 2012 — Cuba
- Scaphioides econotus (Chickering, 1969) — Puerto Rico
- Scaphioides gertschi Platnick & Dupérré, 2012 — Bahama Is.
- Scaphioides granpiedra Platnick & Dupérré, 2012 — Cuba
- Scaphioides halatus (Chickering, 1969) — Caribbean (Leeward Is.)
- Scaphioides hoffi (Chickering, 1969) — Jamaica
- Scaphioides irazu Platnick & Dupérré, 2012 — Costa Rica
- Scaphioides miches Platnick & Dupérré, 2012 — Hispaniola
- Scaphioides minuta (Chamberlin & Ivie, 1935) — USA
- Scaphioides nitens (Bryant, 1942) — Virgin Is.
- Scaphioides phonetus (Chickering, 1969) — Puerto Rico
- Scaphioides reducta Bryant, 1942 — Virgin Is.
- Scaphioides reductoides Platnick & Dupérré, 2012 — Virgin Is.
- Scaphioides siboney Platnick & Dupérré, 2012 — Cuba
- Scaphioides yateras Platnick & Dupérré, 2012 — Cuba
