= Emboonops =

Scientific classification
- Kingdom: Animalia
- Phylum: Arthropoda
- Subphylum: Chelicerata
- Class: Arachnida
- Order: Araneae
- Infraorder: Araneomorphae
- Family: Oonopidae
- Genus: Emboonops; Berniker

Type species
- Emboonops nejapa

Species
- 10, see text

Genus of spiders

Emboonops is a genus of spiders in the family Oonopidae. It was first described in 2015 by Bolzern, Platnick & Berniker. As of 2017, it contains 10 species, all from Mexico.

== Species ==
Emboonops comprises the following species:

- Emboonops arriaga Bolzern, Platnick & Berniker, 2015
- Emboonops bonampak Bolzern, Platnick & Berniker, 2015
- Emboonops calco Bolzern, Platnick & Berniker, 2015
- Emboonops catrin Bolzern, Platnick & Berniker, 2015
- Emboonops hermosa Bolzern, Platnick & Berniker, 2015
- Emboonops mckenziei (Gertsch, 1977)
- Emboonops nejapa Bolzern, Platnick & Berniker, 2015
- Emboonops palenque Bolzern, Platnick & Berniker, 2015
- Emboonops tamaz Bolzern, Platnick & Berniker, 2015
- Emboonops tuxtlas Bolzern, Platnick & Berniker, 2015
