= Setayeshoonops =

Scientific classification
- Domain: Eukaryota
- Kingdom: Animalia
- Phylum: Arthropoda
- Subphylum: Chelicerata
- Class: Arachnida
- Order: Araneae
- Infraorder: Araneomorphae
- Family: Oonopidae
- Genus: Setayeshoonops
- Species: S. setayeshoonops

Binomial name
- Setayeshoonops setayeshoonops Makhan & Ezzatpanah, 2011

Genus of spiders

Setayeshoonops is a genus of spiders in the family Oonopidae. It was first described in 2011 by Makhan & Ezzatpanah. As of 2017, it contains only one species, Setayeshoonops setayeshoonops, found in Suriname.
