= Lionneta =

Scientific classification
- Kingdom: Animalia
- Phylum: Arthropoda
- Subphylum: Chelicerata
- Class: Arachnida
- Order: Araneae
- Infraorder: Araneomorphae
- Family: Oonopidae
- Genus: Lionneta; Benoit

Type species
- Lionneta sechellensis

Species
- 8, see text

Genus of spiders

Lionneta is a genus of spiders in the family Oonopidae. It was first described in 1979 by Benoit. As of 2017, it contains 8 species, all of them from the Seychelles.

== Species ==
Lionneta comprises the following species:

- Lionneta gerlachi Saaristo, 2001
- Lionneta mahensis Benoit, 1979
- Lionneta orophila (Benoit, 1979)
- Lionneta praslinensis Benoit, 1979
- Lionneta savyi (Benoit, 1979)
- Lionneta sechellensis Benoit, 1979
- Lionneta silhouettei Benoit, 1979
- Lionneta veli Saaristo, 2002
