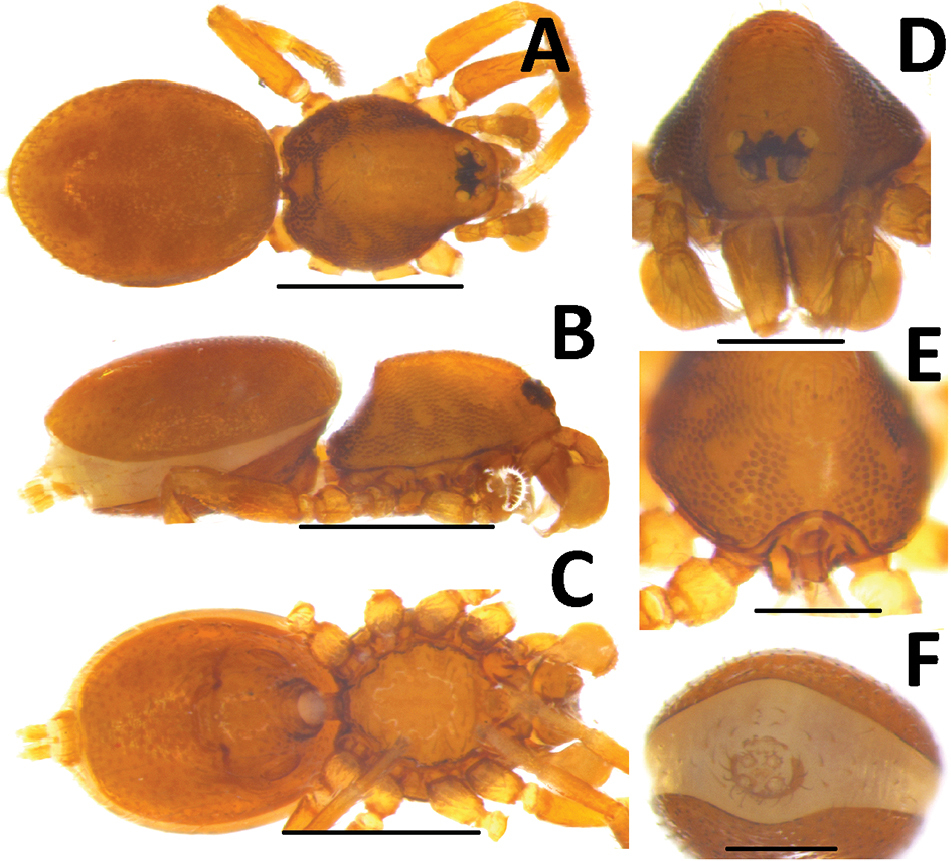
- Silhouettella tiggy

Scientific classification
- Kingdom: Animalia
- Phylum: Arthropoda
- Subphylum: Chelicerata
- Class: Arachnida
- Order: Araneae
- Infraorder: Araneomorphae
- Family: Oonopidae
- Genus: Silhouettella; Benoit

Type species
- Silhouettella curieusei

Species
- 11, see text

= Silhouettella =

Genus of spiders

Silhouettella is a genus of spiders in the family Oonopidae. It was first described in 1979 by Benoit. As of 2021, it contains 11 species.

== Species ==
Silhouettella comprises the following species:

- Silhouettella betalfa Saaristo, 2007 — Israel
- Silhouettella curieusei Benoit, 1979 (type) — Seychelles, Madagascar
- Silhouettella loricatula (Roewer, 1942) — Europe to Central Asia, North Africa, Canary Is.
- Silhouettella osmaniye Wunderlich, 2011 — Turkey, Azerbaijan
- Silhouettella perisalma Álvarez-Padilla, Ubick & Griswold, 2015 — Madagascar
- Silhouettella perismontes Álvarez-Padilla, Ubick & Griswold, 2015 — Madagascar
- Silhouettella saaristoi Ranasinghe & Benjamin, 2018 — Sri Lanka
- Silhouettella snippy Ranasinghe & Benjamin, 2018 — Sri Lanka
- Silhouettella tiggy Ranasinghe & Benjamin, 2018 — Sri Lanka
- Silhouettella tomer Saaristo, 2007 — Israel
- Silhouettella usgutra Saaristo & van Harten, 2002 — Yemen (Socotra)
