= Diblemma donisthorpei =

Scientific classification
- Kingdom: Animalia
- Phylum: Arthropoda
- Subphylum: Chelicerata
- Class: Arachnida
- Order: Araneae
- Infraorder: Araneomorphae
- Family: Oonopidae
- Genus: Diblemma; O. P.-Cambridge, 1908
- Species: D. donisthorpei

Binomial name
- Diblemma donisthorpei O. P.-Cambridge, 1908

Species of spider

Diblemma donisthorpei is the only species in the spider genus Diblemma. It is a member of the family Oonopidae. The species is found in the Seychelles and has been introduced in Britain.
