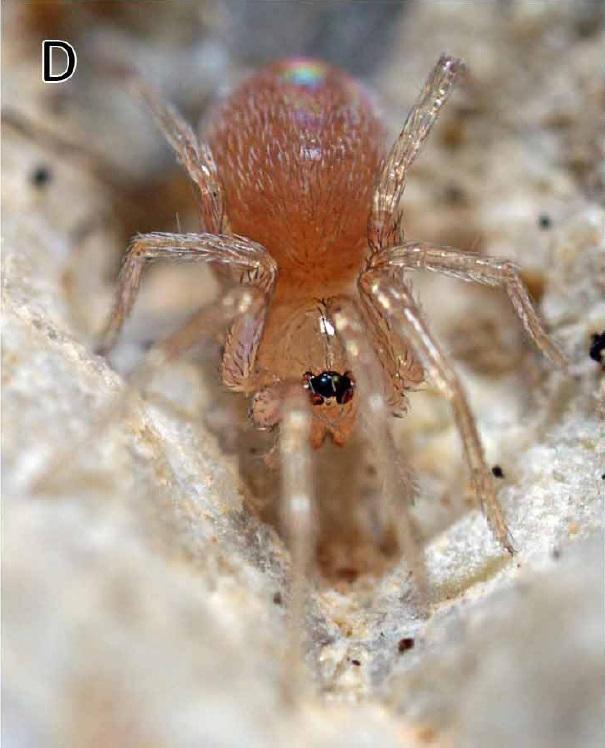
- female Tapinesthis inermis
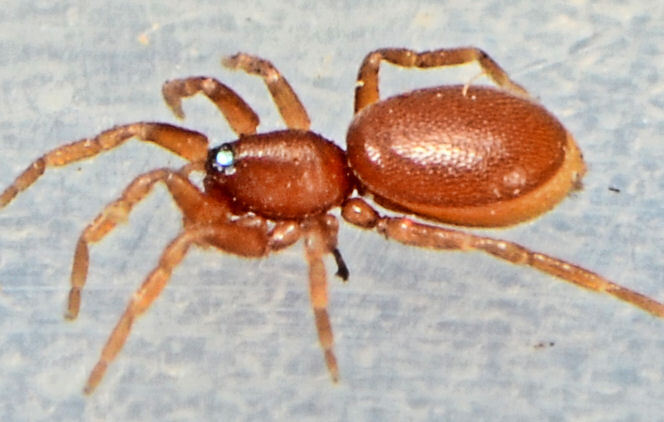
- female Gamasomorpha humicola from South Africa

Scientific classification
- Kingdom: Animalia
- Phylum: Arthropoda
- Subphylum: Chelicerata
- Class: Arachnida
- Order: Araneae
- Infraorder: Araneomorphae
- Family: Oonopidae; Simon, 1890

Diversity
- 115 genera, 1,978 species
- blue: reported countries (WSC)

= Oonopidae =

Goblin spiders Temporal range: Albian–present

Family of spiders

Oonopidae, also known as goblin spiders, is a family of spiders consisting of almost 2,000 described species in 115 genera worldwide, with total species diversity estimated at 2000 to 2500 species. The type genus of the family is Oonops Keyserling, 1835.

== Description ==
Goblin spiders are generally tiny, measuring about 1 to 3 millimeters. Some have scuta, hardened plates on their abdomens. Oonopids usually have six eyes, the anterior median eyes having been lost. However, four-eyed (Opopaea viamao), two-eyed (e.g. Coxapopha, Diblemma) and even completely eyeless species (e.g. Cousinea, the cave-dwelling Blanioonops) are also known. The family is permeated with unusual morphological traits, many of which are limited to males. Examples include heavily modified mouthparts (e.g. Coxapopha, Xyccarph), sternal pouches (sometimes alternatively called holsters; e.g. Grymeus) and extensions of the carapace (e.g. Ferchestina, Unicorn). The male pedipalps are also often highly modified. The genus Opopaea, for example, exhibits an expanded palpal patella while male Ischnothyreus are characterized by completely sclerotized, pitch-black pedipalps. Members of the genus Orchestina are believed to be able to jump, as both sexes have greatly enlarged femora on the fourth leg pair.

== Life style ==
Oonopidae are seldom seen by people as they are too small to be easily noticed. They are generally found in the leaf litter layer and under rocks, but they also constitute a significant component of the spider fauna living in the canopy of tropical rainforest. Three blind Afrotropical genera (Anophthalmoonops, Caecoonops, Termitoonops) are exclusively found in termite nests. A few species, such as the pantropical Heteroonops spinimanus and Triaeris stenaspis, are thought to be parthenogenetic as no males have yet been collected.

== Fossil record ==
Oonopidae are frequently encountered as subfossils preserved in copals and as fossils preserved in amber. Oonopids even occur in more amber deposits than any other spider family, which may be accounted for by their widespread distribution, small size, and wandering behaviour, as amber appears to be biased towards trapping such spiders. In contrast, sedimentary fossils of Oonopidae are unknown.

Most fossil oonopids described from amber are assigned to the extant genus Orchestina. This genus was already widespread by the end of the Cretaceous, as indicated by specimens found in amber dating back over 100 million years.

== Genera ==
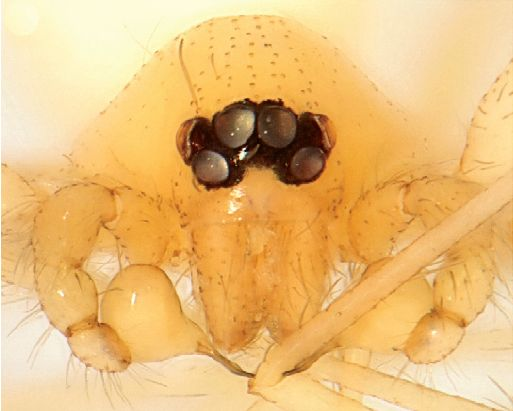
Megaoonops avrona

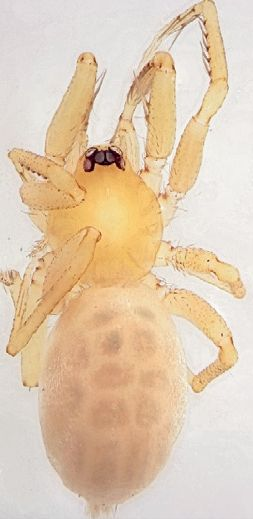
Spinestis nikita

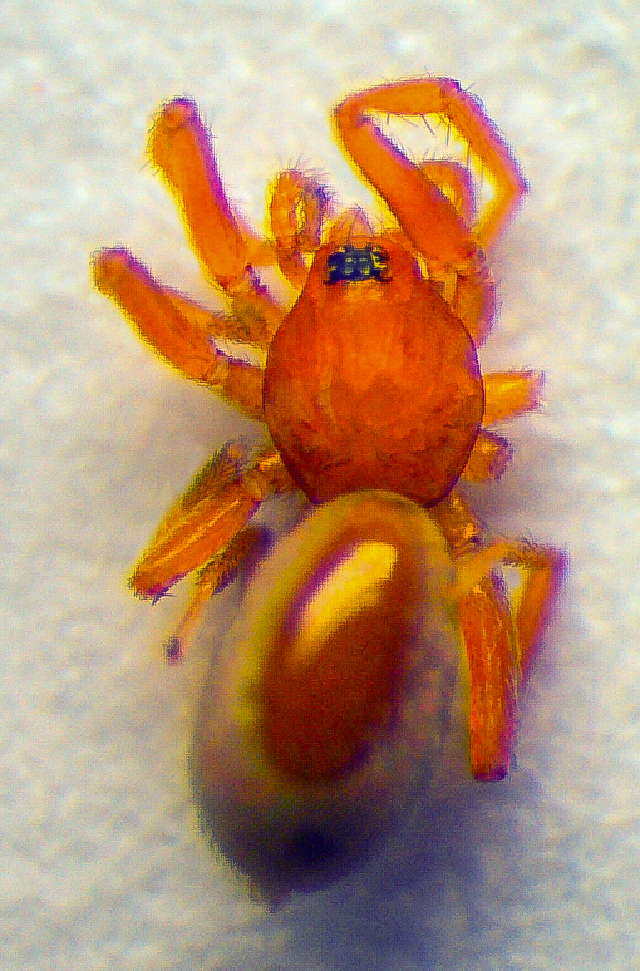
Triaeris stenaspis

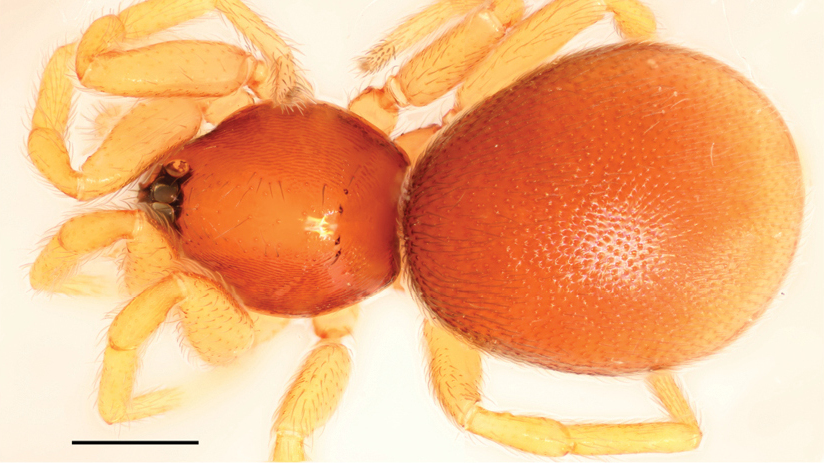
Xestaspis shoushanensis

As of January 2026, this family includes 115 genera and 1,978 species:

- Amazoonops Ott, Ruiz, Brescovit & Bonaldo, 2017 – Brazil
- Anophthalmoonops Benoit, 1976 – Angola
- Antoonops Fannes & Jocqué, 2008 – Cameroon, Ghana, Ivory Coast, Nigeria
- Aposphragisma Thoma, 2014 – Southeast Asia, Borneo
- Aprusia Simon, 1893 – India, Sri Lanka
- Aschnaoonops Makhan & Ezzatpanah, 2011 – Puerto Rico, Trinidad, Virgin Islands, South America
- Australoonops Hewitt, 1915 – Mozambique, South Africa
- Bannana Tong & Li, 2015 – China
- Bidysderina Platnick, Dupérré, Berniker & Bonaldo, 2013 – Ecuador
- Bipoonops Bolzern, 2014 – Ecuador
- Birabenella Grismado, 2010 – Argentina, Chile, Peru
- Blanioonops Simon & Fage, 1922 – East Africa
- Brignolia Dumitrescu & Georgescu, 1983 – Mauritius, Seychelles, Asia, United States, Borneo. Introduced to Africa, Australia, South America
- Caecoonops Benoit, 1964 – DR Congo
- Camptoscaphiella Caporiacco, 1934 – Asia, New Caledonia
- Cavisternum Baehr, Harvey & Smith, 2010 – Sri Lanka, Australia
- Cinetomorpha Simon, 1892 – Mexico to South America
- Cortestina Knoflach, 2009 – Austria, Italy, Spain
- Costarina Platnick & Dupérré, 2011 – North America, Colombia
- Cousinea Saaristo, 2001 – Seychelles
- Coxapopha Platnick, 2000 – Panama, Argentina, Brazil, Peru
- Dalmasula Platnick, Szűts & Ubick, 2012 – Namibia, South Africa
- Diblemma O. Pickard-Cambridge, 1908 – Seychelles. Introduced to Switzerland, Britain
- Dysderina Simon, 1892 – Africa, South America, Philippines
- Dysderoides Fage, 1946 – Thailand, India
- Emboonops Bolzern, Platnick & Berniker, 2015 – Mexico
- Escaphiella Platnick & Dupérré, 2009 – North America, South America
- Farqua Saaristo, 2001 – Seychelles
- Gamasomorpha Karsch, 1881 – Africa, Asia, South America, Australia, Hawaii
- Gradunguloonops Grismado, Izquierdo, González M. & Ramírez, 2015 – South America
- Grymeus Harvey, 1987 – Sri Lanka, Australia
- Guaraguaoonops Brescovit, Rheims & Bonaldo, 2012 – Brazil
- Guatemoonops Bolzern, Platnick & Berniker, 2015 – Guatemala, Mexico
- Heteroonops Dalmas, 1916 – North to South America. Introduced to Madagascar, Japan, Europe, Australia, Pacific Islands
- Hexapopha Platnick, Berniker & Víquez, 2014 – Costa Rica, South America
- Himalayana Grismado, 2014 – India, Nepal
- Hortoonops Platnick & Dupérré, 2012 – Hispaniola, Puerto Rico, Virgin Islands
- Hypnoonops Benoit, 1977 – Congo
- Ischnothyreus Simon, 1893 – Madagascar, Asia, Oceania. Introduced to Europe, Africa
- Kachinia Tong & Li, 2018 – China, Myanmar
- Kapitia Forster, 1956 – New Zealand
- Khamiscar Platnick & Berniker, 2015 – Madagascar
- Khamisia Saaristo & van Harten, 2006 – Kenya, Israel, United Arab Emirates, Yemen. Introduced to Cape Verde
- Khamisina Platnick & Berniker, 2015 – Congo, Kenya, Nigeria
- Khamisoides Platnick & Berniker, 2015 – Virgin Islands
- Kijabe Berland, 1914 – Kenya, East Africa
- Lionneta Benoit, 1979 – Seychelles
- Longoonops Platnick & Dupérré, 2010 – Cuba, Jamaica, Virgin Islands, Costa Rica, Nicaragua, Panama
- Malagiella Ubick & Griswold, 2011 – Madagascar
- Megabulbus Saaristo, 2007 – Israel
- Megaoonops Saaristo, 2007 – Israel
- Melchisedec Fannes, 2010 – Niger, East Africa, West
- Molotra Ubick & Griswold, 2011 – Madagascar
- Neotrops Grismado & Ramírez, 2013 – Trinidad, Panama, South America
- Neoxyphinus Birabén, 1953 – Jamaica, Trinidad, South America
- Nephrochirus Simon, 1910 – Namibia
- Niarchos Platnick & Dupérré, 2010 – Colombia, Ecuador, Peru
- Noideattella Álvarez-Padilla, Ubick & Griswold, 2012 – Madagascar, Seychelles
- Noonops Platnick & Berniker, 2013 – Bahama Islands, Mexico, United States
- Oonopinus Simon, 1893 – Africa, China, Europe, Oceania, Venezuela
- Oonopoides Bryant, 1940 – North America, Venezuela, possibly Jamaica
- Oonops Templeton, 1835 – Worldwide
- Opopaea Simon, 1892 – Worldwide
- Orchestina Simon, 1882 – Africa, Asia, Europe, North America, Oceania. Introduced to South America
- Ovobulbus Saaristo, 2007 – Egypt, Israel
- Paradysderina Platnick & Dupérré, 2011 – South America
- Paramolotra Tong & Li, 2021 – China, India
- Patri Saaristo, 2001 – Seychelles
- Pelicinus Simon, 1892 – Asia, Oceania. Introduced to Africa, South America
- Pescennina Simon, 1903 – Mexico to South America
- Plectoptilus Simon, 1905 – Indonesia
- Ponsoonops Bolzern, 2014 – North America, Colombia, Venezuela
- Predatoroonops Brescovit, Rheims & Ott, 2012 – Brazil
- Prethopalpus Baehr, Harvey, Burger & Thoma, 2012 – Asia, Australia, Papua New Guinea
- Prida Saaristo, 2001 – Seychelles. Introduced to Switzerland
- Prodysderina Platnick, Dupérré, Berniker & Bonaldo, 2013 – Colombia, Venezuela
- Promolotra Tong & Li, 2020 – China, Myanmar
- Pseudodysderina Platnick, Berniker & Bonaldo, 2013 – South America
- Pseudoscaphiella Simon, 1907 – South Africa
- Puan Izquierdo, 2012 – Argentina
- Reductoonops Platnick & Berniker, 2014 – Mexico to South America
- Scaphidysderina Platnick & Dupérré, 2011 – Colombia, Ecuador, Peru
- Scaphiella Simon, 1892 – North America, South America, Saba
- Scaphioides Bryant, 1942 – North America
- Scaphios Platnick & Dupérré, 2010 – Colombia, Ecuador
- Semibulbus Saaristo, 2007 – Israel
- Semidysderina Platnick & Dupérré, 2011 – Colombia
- Setayeshoonops Makhan & Ezzatpanah, 2011 – Suriname
- Sicariomorpha Ott & Harvey, 2015 – Malaysia
- Silhouettella Benoit, 1979 – Africa, Asia, Europ
- Simlops Bonaldo, Ott & Ruiz, 2014 – Trinidad, South America
- Simonoonops Harvey, 2002 – Caribbean, Guyana, Venezuela
- Socotroonops Saaristo & van Harten, 2002 – Yemen
- Spinestis Saaristo & Marusik, 2009 – Ukraine
- Stenoonops Simon, 1892 – Seychelles, North America, Colombia, Venezuela, Guadaloupe, Saba
- Sulsula Simon, 1882 – Algeria, Egypt, Sudan
- Tapinesthis Simon, 1914 – Europe. Introduced to North America
- Telchius Simon, 1893 – Algeria, Morocco, South Africa
- Termitoonops Benoit, 1964 – Congo
- Tinadysderina Platnick, Berniker & Bonaldo, 2013 – Colombia, Ecuador
- Tolegnaro Álvarez-Padilla, Ubick & Griswold, 2012 – Madagascar
- Toloonops Bolzern, Platnick & Berniker, 2015 – Belize, Guatemala, Mexico
- Triaeris Simon, 1892 – Africa, India, Zanzibar.
- Tridysderina Platnick, Berniker & Bonaldo, 2013 – Ecuador
- Trilacuna Tong & Li, 2007 – Asia
- Unicorn Platnick & Brescovit, 1995 – Argentina, Bolivia, Chile
- Varioonops Bolzern & Platnick, 2013 – Costa Rica, Panama, Colombia, Venezuela
- Vientianea Tong & Li, 2013 – Laos
- Volborattella Saucedo & Ubick, 2015 – Madagascar
- Wanops Chamberlin & Ivie, 1938 – Mexico
- Xestaspis Simon, 1885 – Equatorial Guinea, Ethiopia, Africa, Asia, Australia, French Polynesia. Introduced to Japan, Yemen, South America
- Xiombarg Brignoli, 1979 – Argentina, Brazil
- Xyccarph Brignoli, 1978 – Brazil
- Xyphinus Simon, 1893 – Asia, Australia, Borneo
- Zyngoonops Benoit, 1977 – Congo, Central African Republic

=== Extinct genera ===
- †Burmorchestina Wunderlich 2008 Burmese amber, Myanmar, Cenomanian
- †Canadaorchestina Wunderlich 2008 Canadian amber, Campanian
- †Fossilopaea Wunderlich 1988 Dominican amber, Miocene
