= House spider =

The name house spider is a generic term for 11 different spiders commonly found around human dwellings, and may refer to their common name:

- Yellow sac spider, Cheiracanthium inclusum, a common spider worldwide often found in dwellings
- Black house spider, Badumna insignis, an Australian spider also found in New Zealand
- Brown house spider, Steatoda grossa, a spider with cosmopolitan distribution
- American house spider, Parasteatoda tepidariorum, a cobweb spider
- Cellar spider, of the family Pholcidae, also known as daddy long-legs in North America
- Domestic house spider, Tegenaria domestica, also known as barn weaver in North America
- Giant house spider, Eratigena atrica (formerly Tegenaria gigantea)
- Hobo spider, Eratigena agrestis (sometimes known as aggressive house spider)
- Geometric house spider or house button spider, Latrodectus geometricus (more commonly known as the brown widow)
- Southern house spider, Kukulcania hibernalis
- Tiny house spider, Oonops domesticus

== Disambiguation gallery ==
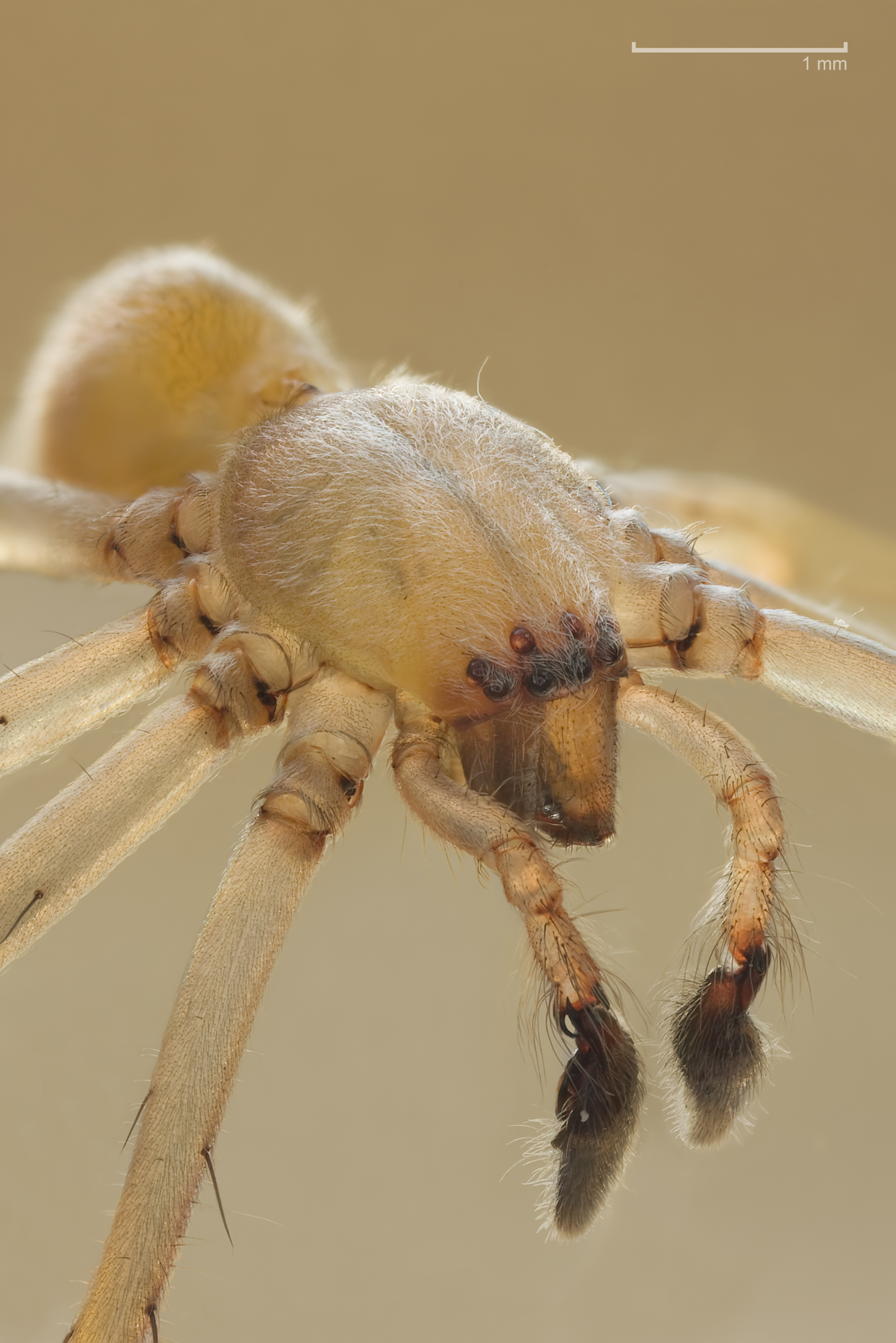
Yellow sac spider, Chiracanthium inclusum, a common house spider worldwide

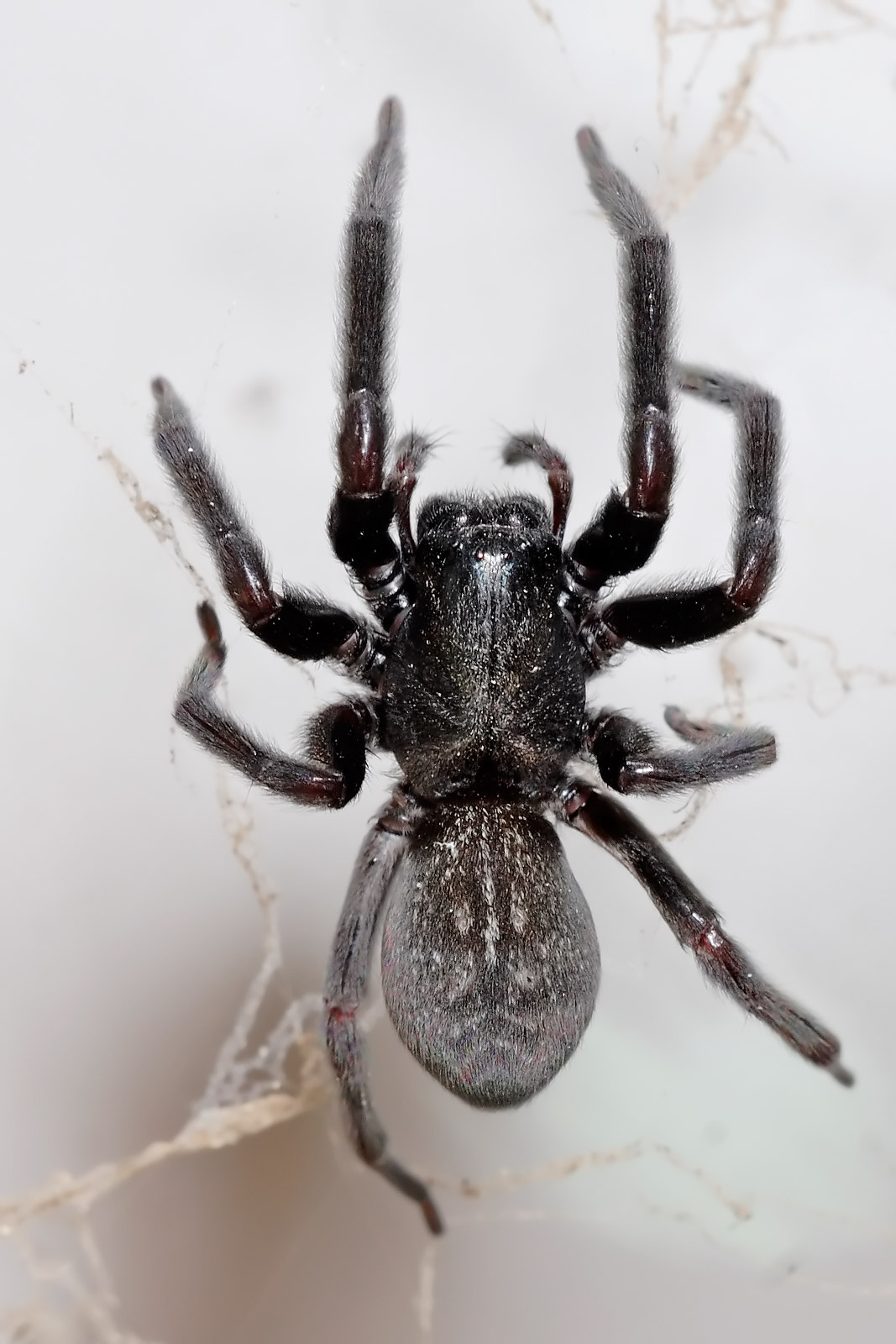
Black house spider, Badumna insignis, an Australian spider also found in New Zealand

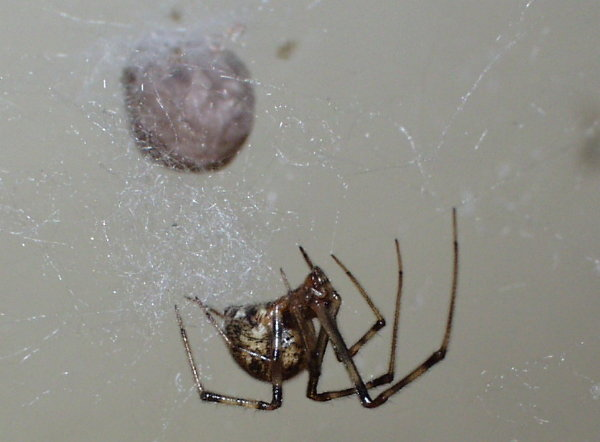
American house spider, Parasteatoda tepidariorum, a cobweb spider

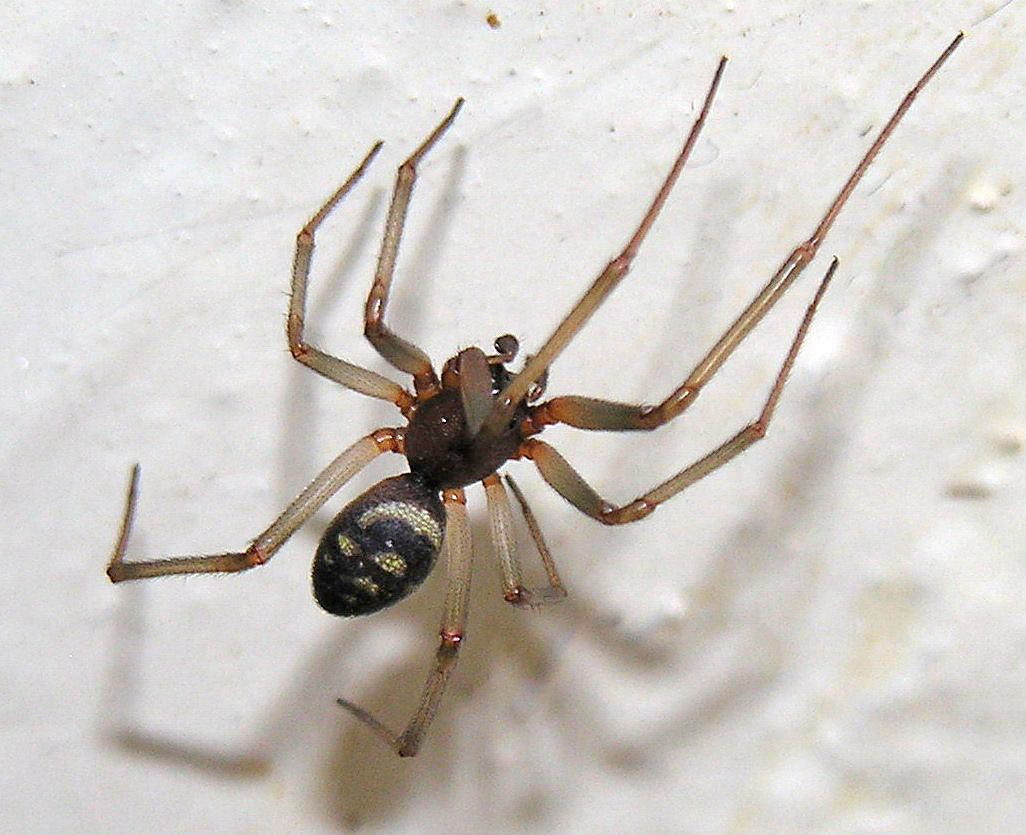
Brown house spider, Steatoda grossa, a spider with cosmopolitan distribution

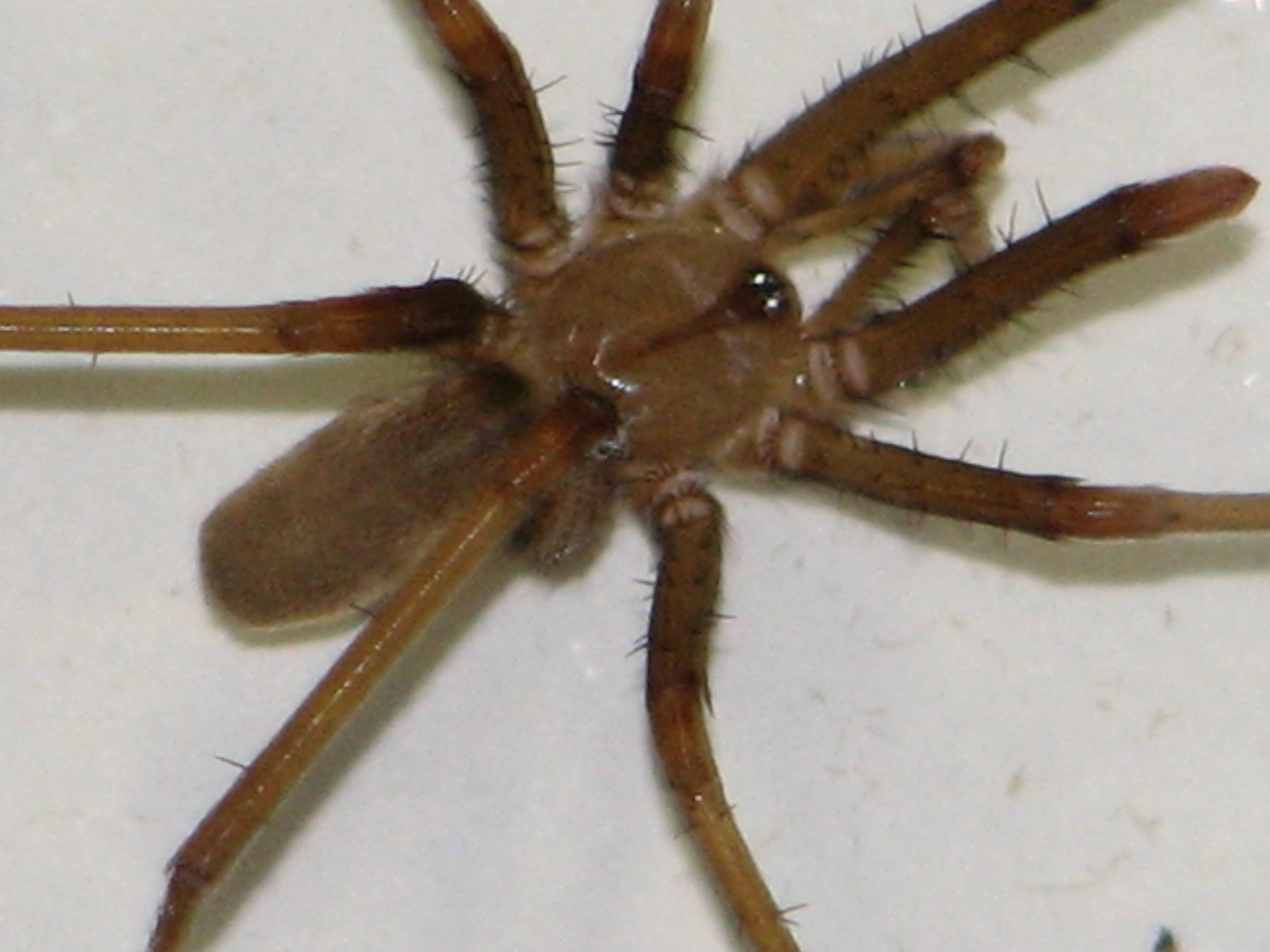
Southern house spider, Kukulcania hibernalis

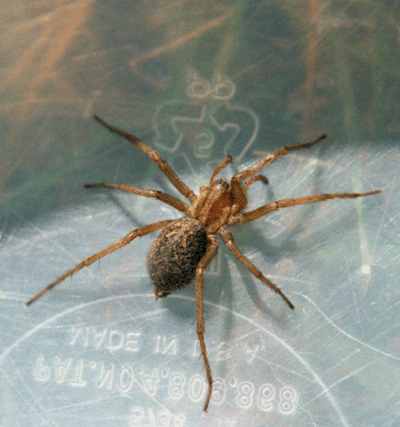
Hobo spider, Tegenaria agrestis (sometimes called the aggressive house spider)

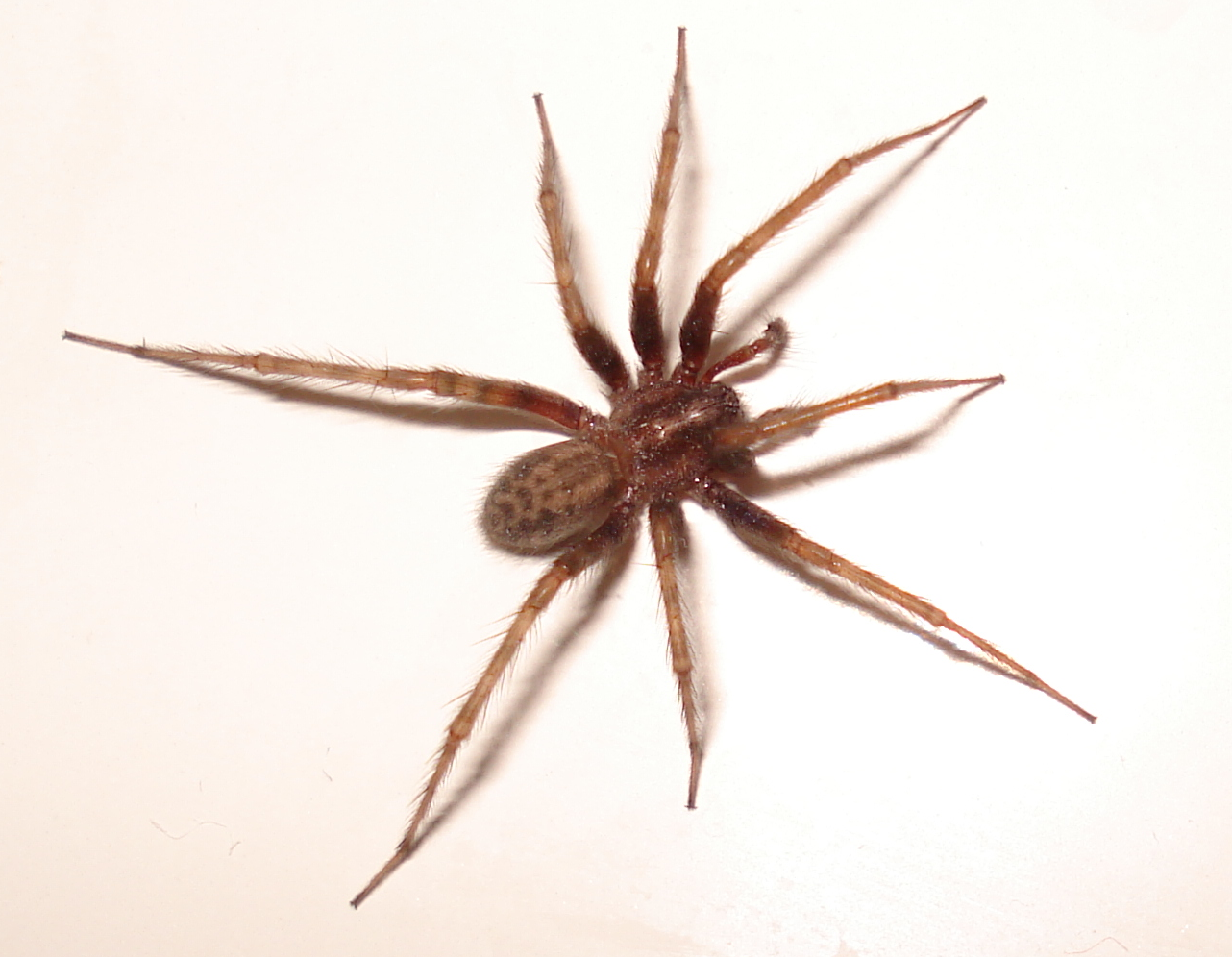
Domestic house spider, Tegenaria domestica

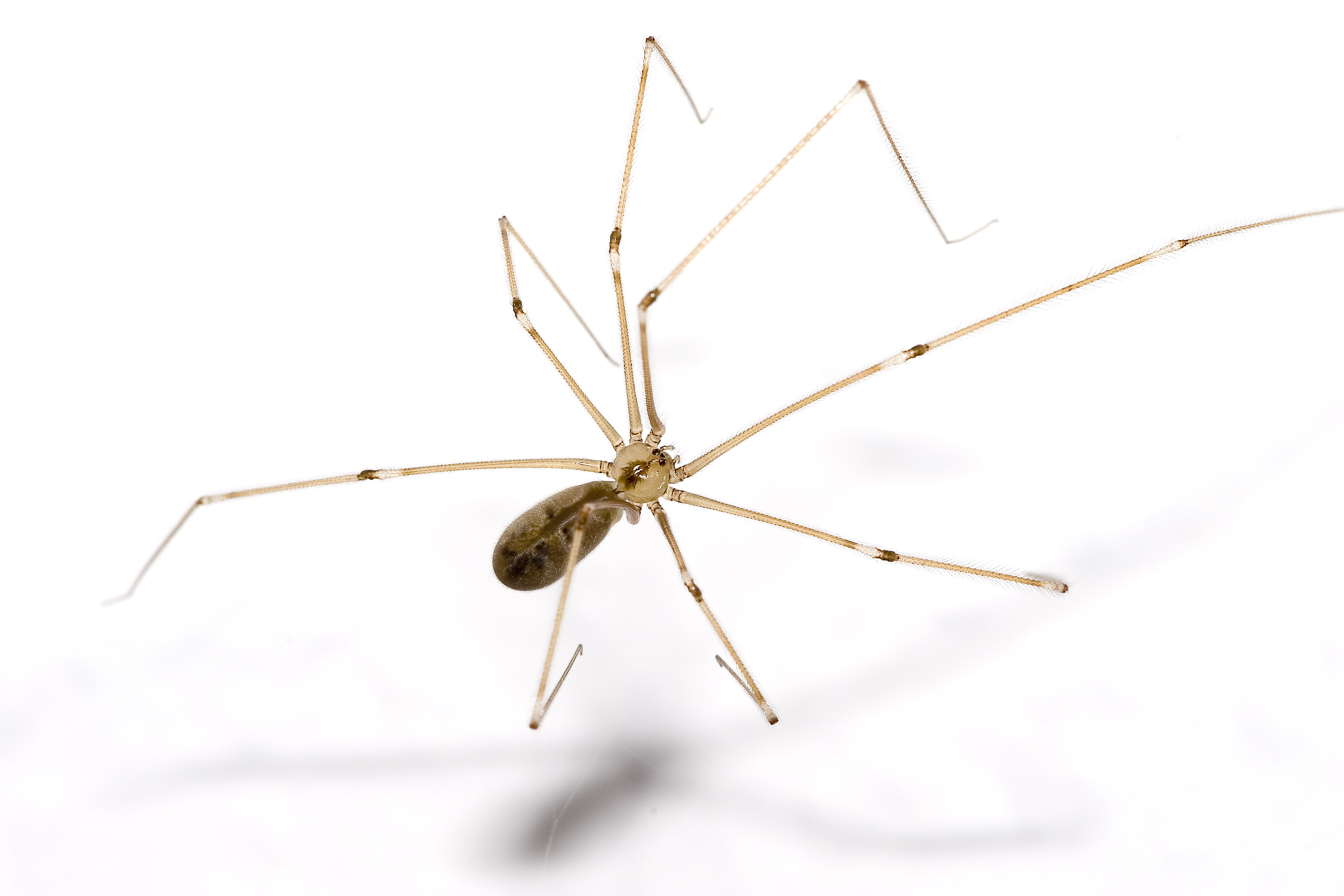
Cellar spiders, of the family Pholcidae

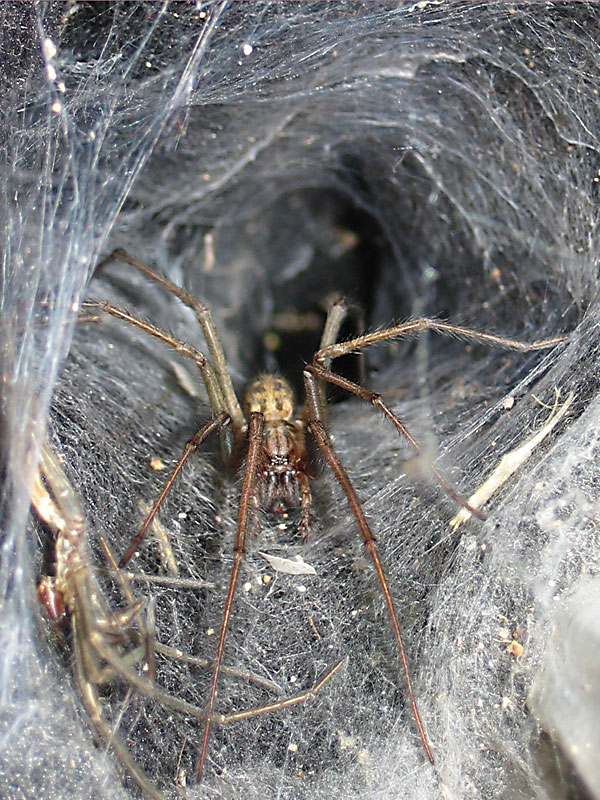
Giant house spider, Eratigena atrica (formerly Tegenaria gigantea)

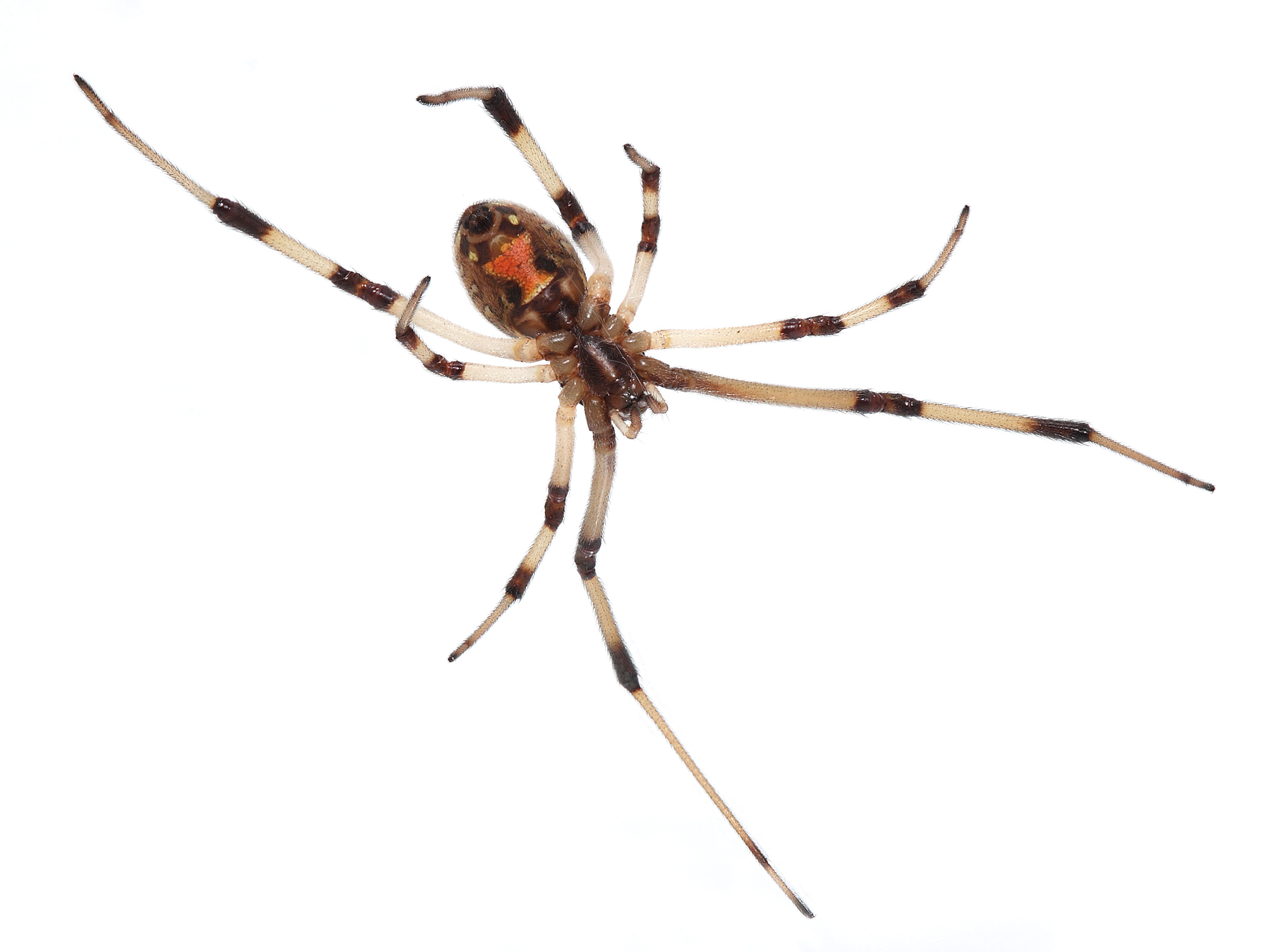
Geometric house spider, Latrodectus geometricus

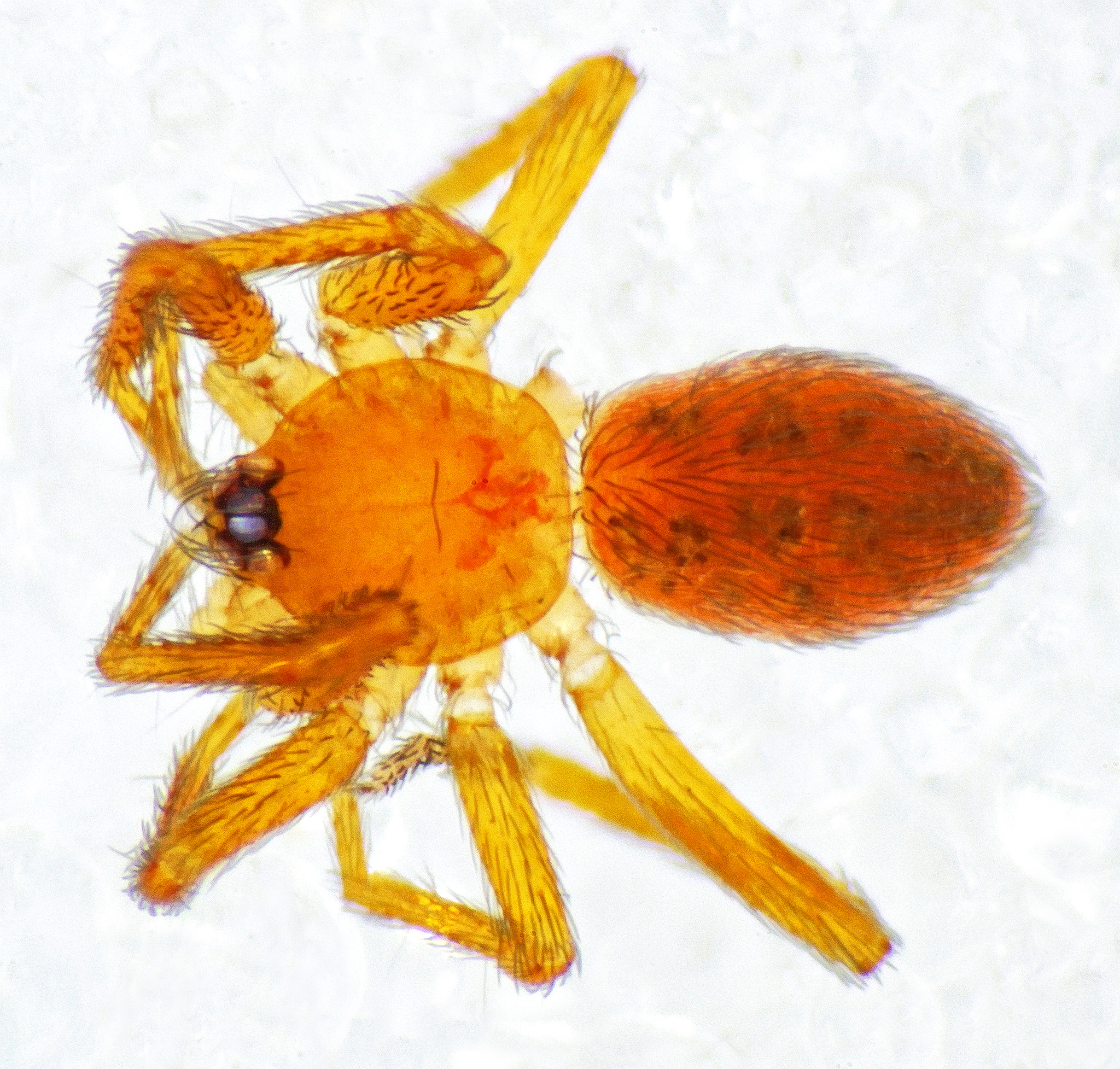
Tiny house spider, Oonops domesticus
