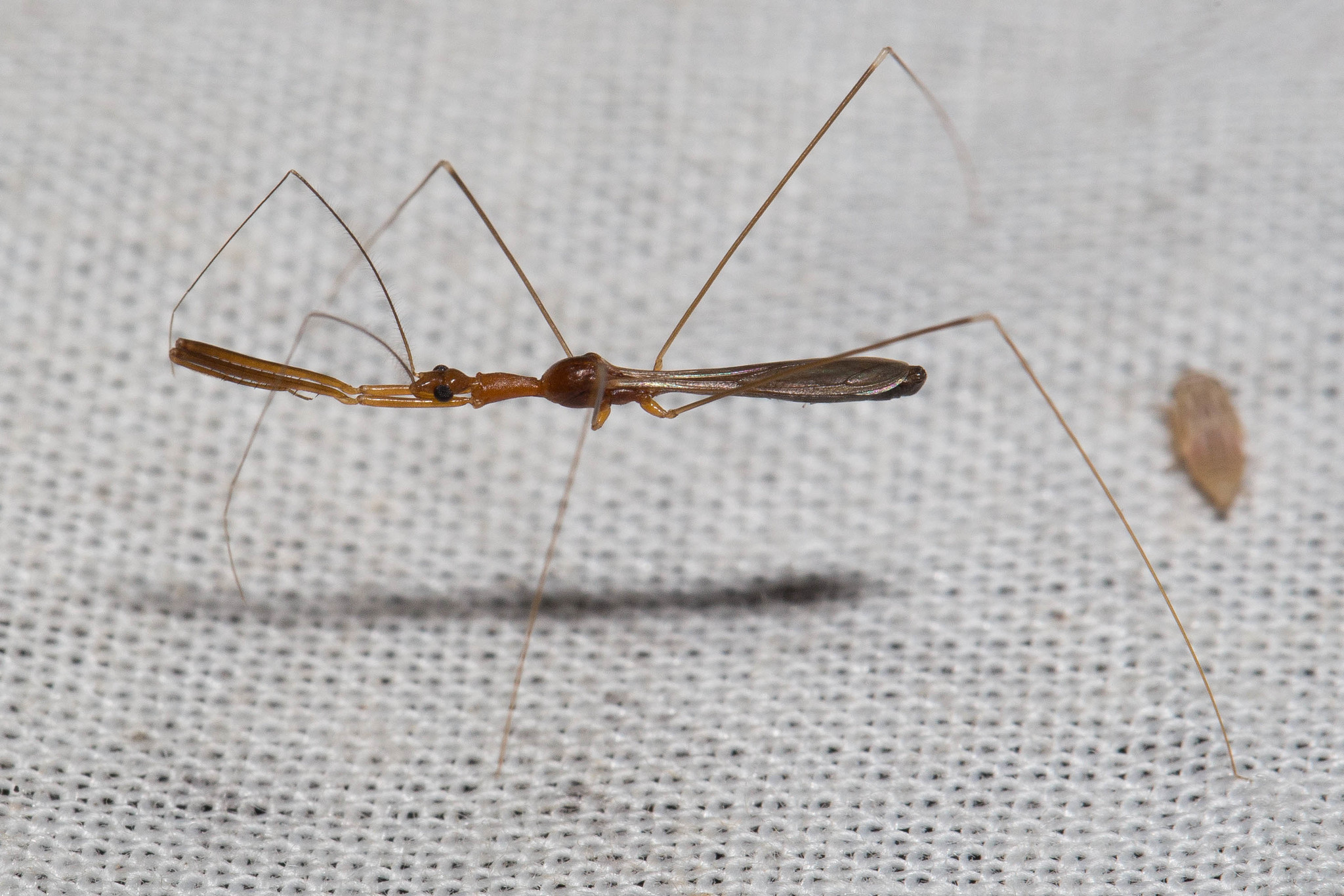

Scientific classification
- Domain: Eukaryota
- Kingdom: Animalia
- Phylum: Arthropoda
- Class: Insecta
- Order: Hemiptera
- Suborder: Heteroptera
- Family: Reduviidae
- Tribe: Emesini
- Genus: Gardena
- Species: G. elkinsi

Binomial name
- Gardena elkinsi Wygodzinsky, 1966

= Gardena elkinsi =

Species of true bug

Gardena elkinsi is a species of thread-legged bug in the family Reduviidae. It is found in Central America and North America.
