= Emesa tenerrima =

Scientific classification
- Kingdom: Animalia
- Phylum: Arthropoda
- Class: Insecta
- Order: Hemiptera
- Suborder: Heteroptera
- Family: Reduviidae
- Subfamily: Emesinae
- Tribe: Emesini
- Genus: Emesa
- Species: E. tenerrima

Binomial name
- Emesa tenerrima (Dohrn, 1860)

Species of true bug

Emesa tenerrima is a thread-legged bug from the genus Emesa. It is found in semi-evergreen forest in Puerto Rico. E. tenerrima lives in the webs of the spider Modisimus signatus which it also physically resembles.
