= Stenolemus spiniventris =

Scientific classification
- Domain: Eukaryota
- Kingdom: Animalia
- Phylum: Arthropoda
- Class: Insecta
- Order: Hemiptera
- Suborder: Heteroptera
- Family: Reduviidae
- Tribe: Emesini
- Genus: Stenolemus
- Species: S. spiniventris

Binomial name
- Stenolemus spiniventris Signoret, 1858

Species of true bug

Stenolemus spiniventris is a species of thread-legged bug in the family Reduviidae. It is found in Central America and North America.
