= Gardena (bug) =

Scientific classification
- Domain: Eukaryota
- Kingdom: Animalia
- Phylum: Arthropoda
- Class: Insecta
- Order: Hemiptera
- Suborder: Heteroptera
- Family: Reduviidae
- Tribe: Emesini
- Genus: Gardena; Dohrn, 1860

Genus of true bugs

Gardena is a genus of thread-legged bugs in the subfamily Emesinae. It is the second-largest genus in the tribe Emesini. Presently there are 46 described species.

== Partial species list ==
These 10 species belong to the genus Gardena:

- Gardena albiannulata Ishikawa, 2005^{g}
- Gardena brevicollis Stål, 1871^{g}
- Gardena cheesmanae Wygodzinsky, 1958
- Gardena elkinsi Wygodzinsky, 1966^{i c g b}
- Gardena faustina McAtee & Malloch, 1925^{g}
- Gardena insignis Horvath, 1887^{g}
- Gardena insperata P. V. Putshkov, 1988
- Gardena melinarthrum Dohrn, 1860^{i c g}
- Gardena muscicapa (Bergroth, 1906)^{g}
- Gardena poppaea McAtee and Malloch, 1925^{i c g}

Data sources: i = ITIS, c = Catalogue of Life, g = GBIF, b = Bugguide.net
