= Oonops mahnerti =

Scientific classification
- Kingdom: Animalia
- Phylum: Arthropoda
- Subphylum: Chelicerata
- Class: Arachnida
- Order: Araneae
- Infraorder: Araneomorphae
- Family: Oonopidae
- Genus: Oonops
- Species: O. mahnerti

Binomial name
- Oonops mahnerti Brignoli, 1974

Species of spider

Oonops mahnerti is a spider species found in Greece.
