= Phasmatocoris spectrum =

Scientific classification
- Domain: Eukaryota
- Kingdom: Animalia
- Phylum: Arthropoda
- Class: Insecta
- Order: Hemiptera
- Suborder: Heteroptera
- Family: Reduviidae
- Genus: Phasmatocoris
- Species: P. spectrum

Binomial name
- Phasmatocoris spectrum Breddin, 1904

Species of true bug

Phasmatocoris spectrum is a thread-legged bug species from the genus Phasmatocoris. It is found in South America, having been recorded in Brazil, Colombia, Bolivia, and Venezuela. The Colombia record was taken from a “Palma Real” (Scheelea sp. (Arecaceae)) tree in the forest interior. Phasmatocoris papei sp. nov. (Hemiptera: Heteroptera: Reduviidae: Emesinae: Emesini) is described from French Guiana based on two male specimens. Short taxonomical notes on Phasmatocoris praecellens (Bergroth, 1911) and Ph. spectrum Breddin, 1904 are provided. An updated key to the species of Phasmatocoris Breddin, 1904 is presented.
