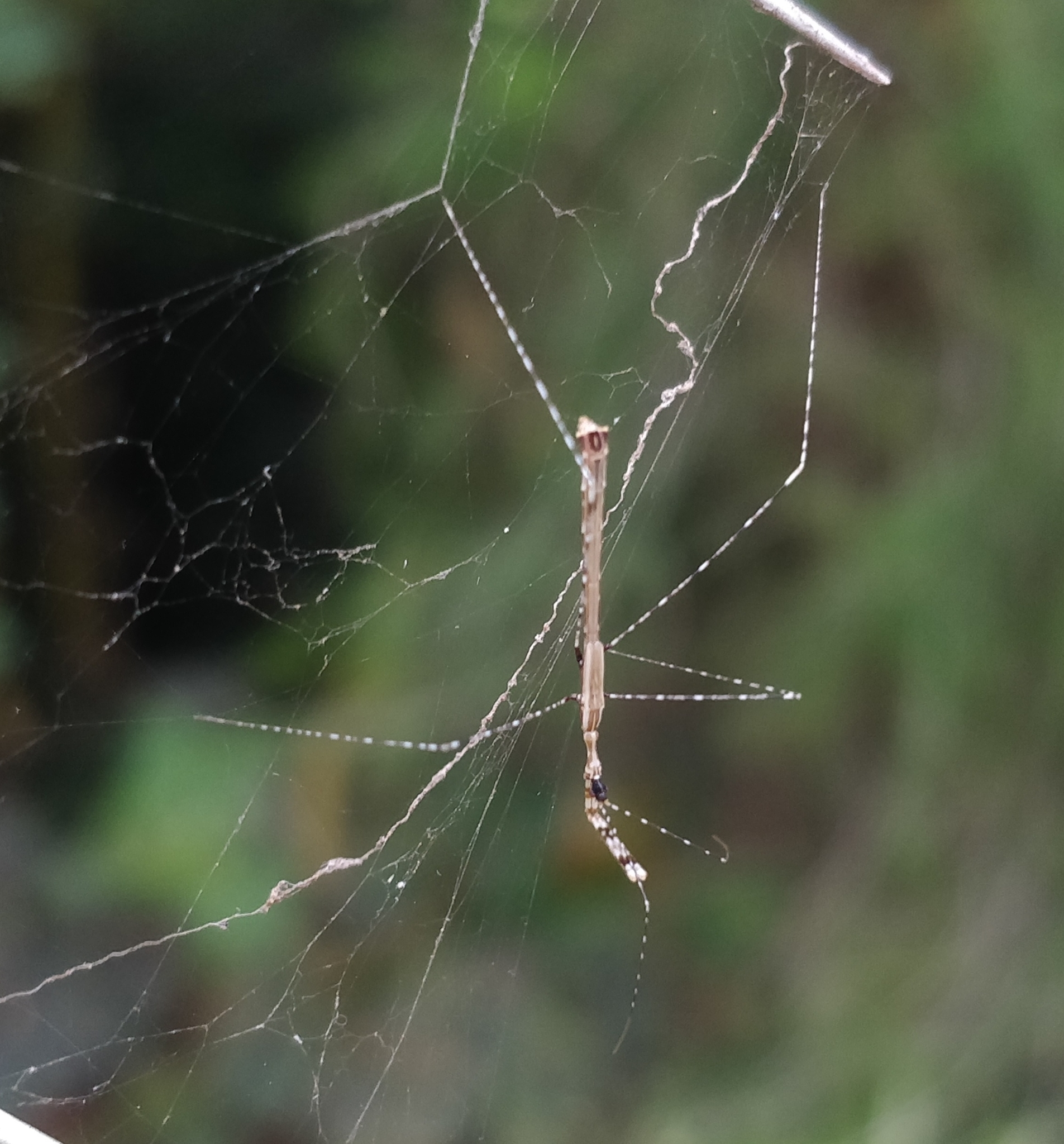
- Eugubinus, India

Scientific classification
- Domain: Eukaryota
- Kingdom: Animalia
- Phylum: Arthropoda
- Class: Insecta
- Order: Hemiptera
- Suborder: Heteroptera
- Family: Reduviidae
- Subfamily: Emesinae
- Tribe: Emesini
- Genus: Eugubinus; Distant, 1903

= Eugubinus (bug) =

Genus of true bugs

Eugubinus is a genus of thread-legged bugs in the assassin bug family Reduviidae. There are about nine described species in Eugubinus, found in Australia, southern Asia, and Africa.

== Species ==
These nine species belong to the genus Eugubinus:

- Eugubinus annulatus (Villiers, 1948) (Africa)
- Eugubinus araneus Distant, 1903 (Southern Asia)
- Eugubinus canalanus (Distant, 1914) (Australia)
- Eugubinus forsteri Wygodzinsky, 1953 (Australia)
- Eugubinus intrudans Distant, 1915 (Southern Asia)
- Eugubinus leleupi (Villiers, 1949) (Africa)
- Eugubinus papuensis Wygodzinsky, 1966 (Australia)
- Eugubinus reticolus Distant, 1915 (Southern Asia)
- Eugubinus strangulatus (Villiers, 1959) (Africa)
