= Stenolemus alikakay =

Scientific classification
- Domain: Eukaryota
- Kingdom: Animalia
- Phylum: Arthropoda
- Class: Insecta
- Order: Hemiptera
- Suborder: Heteroptera
- Family: Reduviidae
- Genus: Stenolemus
- Species: S. alikakay

Binomial name
- Stenolemus alikakay Rédei & Tsai, 2010

Species of true bug

Stenolemus alikakay is a species of assassin bug, family Reduviidae. It was first found in a spider web at Shanping Forest Ecological Science Park, Taiwan. It has later also been found on Ishigaki Island, the Ryukyu Islands, Japan.

Stenolemus alikakay has a body size of about 10 mm (0.4 in).
