= Polauchenia =

Scientific classification
- Kingdom: Animalia
- Phylum: Arthropoda
- Class: Insecta
- Order: Hemiptera
- Suborder: Heteroptera
- Family: Reduviidae
- Tribe: Emesini
- Genus: Polauchenia; McAtee & Malloch, 1925

Genus of true bugs

Polauchenia is a genus of thread-legged bug (Emesinae). Only five species have been described.

== Partial Species list ==
- Polauchenia marcapata Wygodzinsky, 1966
- Polauchenia protentor McAtee and Malloch, 1925
