= Oonops placidus =

Scientific classification
- Kingdom: Animalia
- Phylum: Arthropoda
- Subphylum: Chelicerata
- Class: Arachnida
- Order: Araneae
- Infraorder: Araneomorphae
- Family: Oonopidae
- Genus: Oonops
- Species: O. placidus

Binomial name
- Oonops placidus Dalmas, 1916

Subspecies
- Oonops placidus corsicus Dalmas, 1916 — France, Italy

Species of spider

Oonops placidus is a spider species found in France.
