= Gardena insignis =

Scientific classification
- Domain: Eukaryota
- Kingdom: Animalia
- Phylum: Arthropoda
- Class: Insecta
- Order: Hemiptera
- Suborder: Heteroptera
- Family: Reduviidae
- Genus: Gardena
- Species: G. insignis

Binomial name
- Gardena insignis Horvath, 1887

Species of true bug

Gardena insignis is a thread-legged bug species from the genus Gardena. It is found in Central Europe, including Slovenia.
