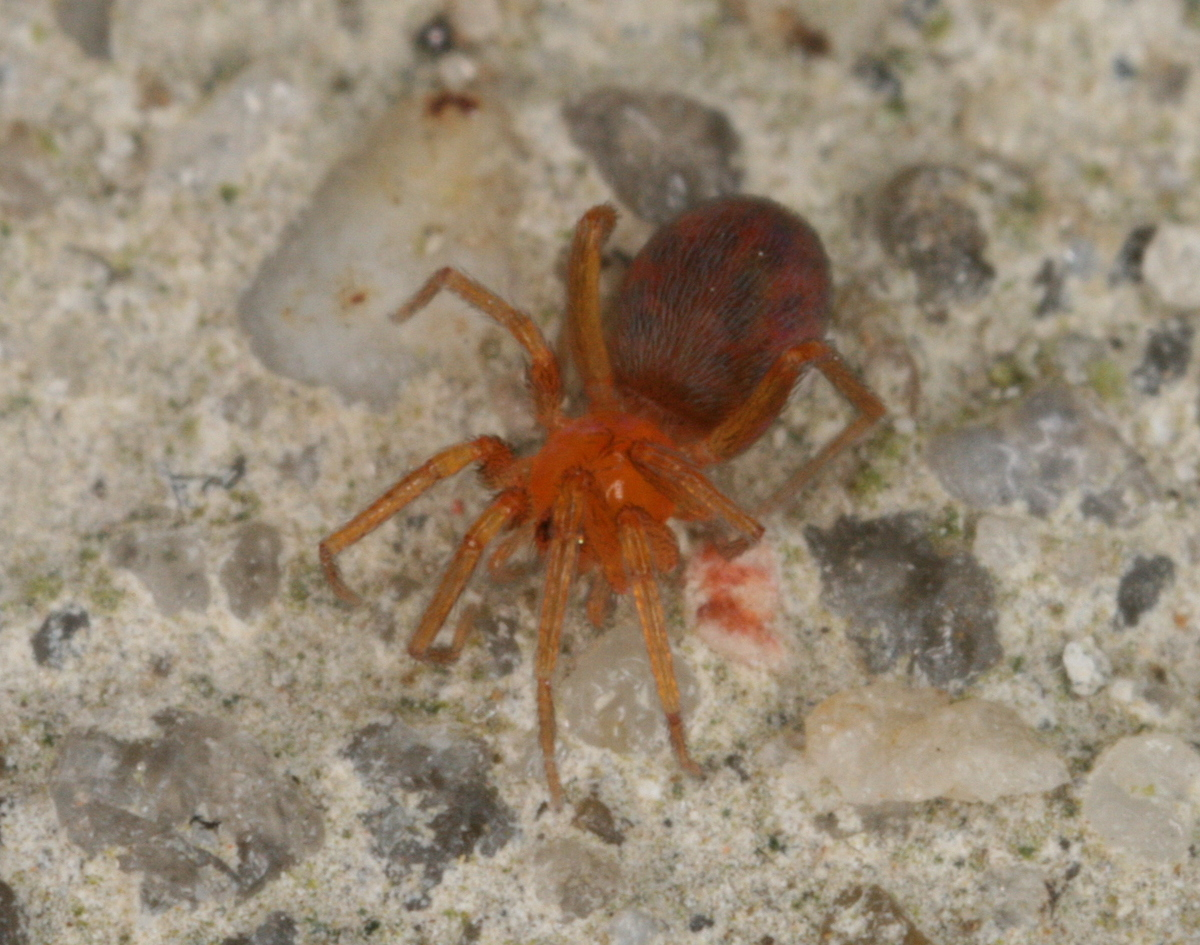
- Oonops domesticus in Denmark
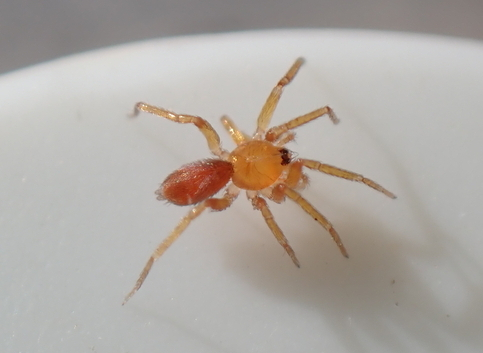
- Oonops pulcher in France

Scientific classification
- Kingdom: Animalia
- Phylum: Arthropoda
- Subphylum: Chelicerata
- Class: Arachnida
- Order: Araneae
- Infraorder: Araneomorphae
- Family: Oonopidae
- Genus: Oonops; Templeton, 1835

Species
- 49 species

= Oonops =

Genus of spiders

Oonops is a genus of spiders mostly found in America, Europe to Russia and East and North Africa.

One species, O. pulcher, is not only found in Europe and North Africa, but also on Tasmania, although no species occurs on the Australian mainland. O. triangulipes is distributed in Micronesia. O. caecus is restricted to Lesotho, and O. leai is endemic to Lord Howe Island.

== Species ==
As of October 2025, this genus includes 47 species and two subspecies:

- Oonops acanthopus Simon, 1907 – Brazil
- Oonops alticola Berland, 1914 – East Africa
- Oonops amacus Chickering, 1971 – Trinidad
- Oonops amoenus Dalmas, 1916 – France
- Oonops aristelus Chickering, 1972 – Antigua and Barbuda (Antigua)
- Oonops balanus Chickering, 1972 – Caribbean
- Oonops caecus Benoit, 1975 – Lesotho
- Oonops citrinus Berland, 1914 – East Africa
- Oonops cubanus Dumitrescu & Georgescu, 1983 – Cuba
- Oonops cuervus Gertsch & Davis, 1942 – Mexico
- Oonops domesticus Dalmas, 1916 – Europe, Georgia
- Oonops ebenecus Chickering, 1972 – Puerto Rico
- Oonops figuratus Simon, 1892 – St. Vincent, Venezuela
- Oonops gavarrensis Bosselaers, 2017 – Spain
- Oonops globimanus Simon, 1892 – St. Vincent, Venezuela
- Oonops hasselti Strand, 1906 – Scandinavia
- Oonops itascus Chickering, 1971 – Trinidad
- Oonops leai Rainbow, 1920 – Australia (Lord Howe Is.)
- Oonops leitaoni Bristowe, 1938 – Brazil
- Oonops longespinosus Denis, 1937 – Algeria
- Oonops longipes Berland, 1914 – East Africa
- Oonops loxoscelinus Simon, 1893 – Venezuela
- Oonops lubricus Dalmas, 1916 – France
- Oonops mahnerti Brignoli, 1974 – Greece
- Oonops minutus Dumitrescu & Georgescu, 1983 – Cuba
- Oonops oblucus Chickering, 1972 – Jamaica
- Oonops olitor Simon, 1911 – Algeria
- Oonops ornatus Chickering, 1971 – Panama
- Oonops persitus Chickering, 1971 – Panama
- Oonops petulans Gertsch & Davis, 1942 – Mexico
- Oonops placidus Dalmas, 1916 – France
  - O. p. corsicus Dalmas, 1916 – France, Italy
- Oonops procerus Simon, 1882 – France, Spain
- Oonops propinquus Dumitrescu & Georgescu, 1983 – Cuba
- Oonops pulcher Templeton, 1835 – Europe, North Africa, Georgia, Azerbaijan. Introduced to Tasmania (type species)
  - O. p. hispanicus Dalmas, 1916 – Spain
- Oonops pulicarius Simon, 1892 – St. Vincent, Venezuela
- Oonops reddelli Gertsch, 1977 – Mexico
- Oonops reticulatus Petrunkevitch, 1925 – Costa Rica, Panama, Puerto Rico, Trinidad
- Oonops ronoxus Chickering, 1972 – Virgin Is.
- Oonops rowlandi Gertsch, 1977 – Mexico
- Oonops sativus Chickering, 1971 – Trinidad
- Oonops sicorius Chickering, 1971 – Curaçao
- Oonops stylifer Gertsch, 1936 – United States
- Oonops tectulus Chickering, 1971 – Trinidad
- Oonops triangulipes Karsch, 1881 – Micronesia
- Oonops tubulatus Dalmas, 1916 – Portugal, Algeria
- Oonops vestus Chickering, 1971 – Trinidad
- Oonops viridans Bryant, 1942 – Puerto Rico
