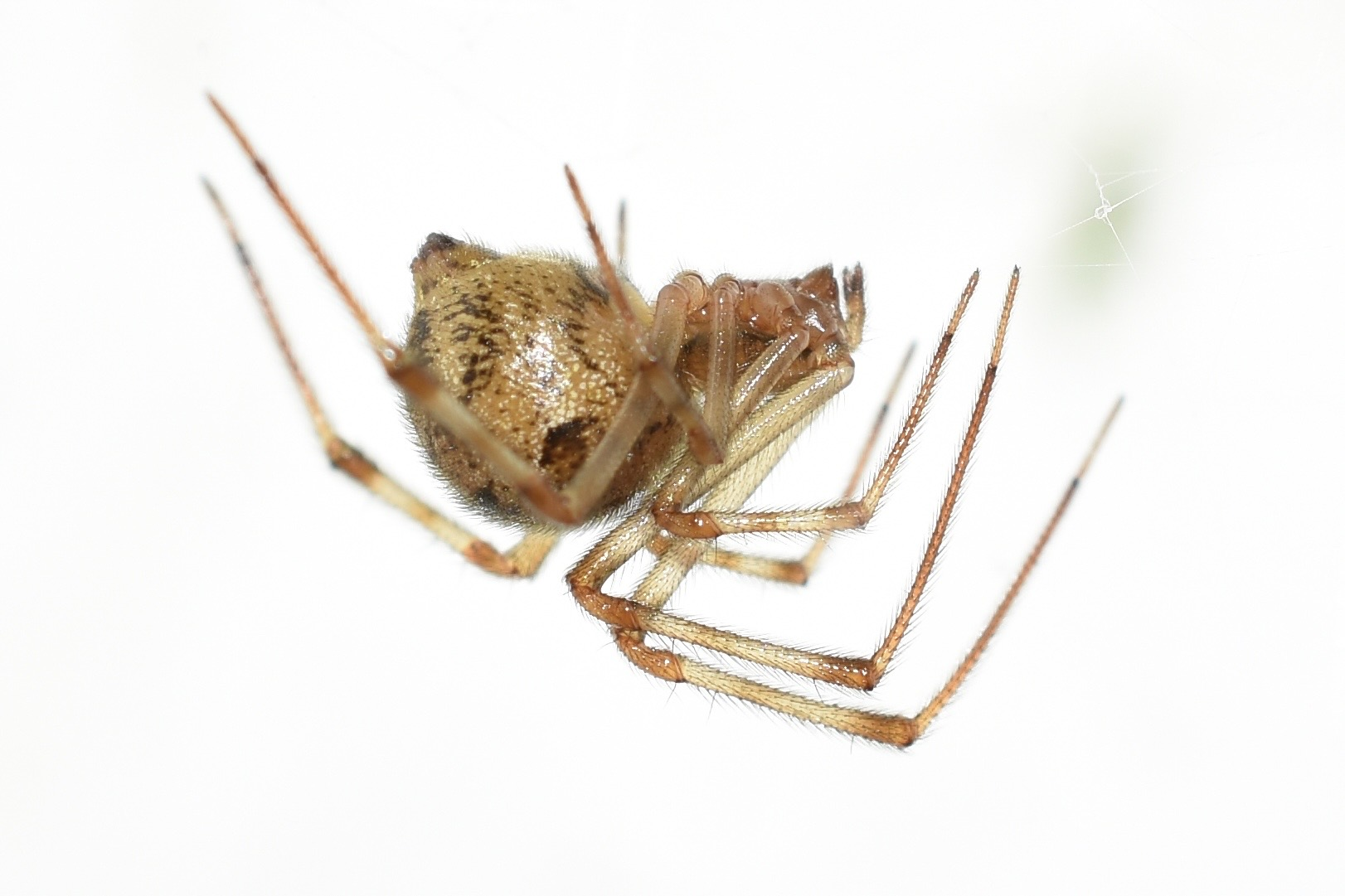
- Common house spider in Nuwara Eliya, Sri Lanka

Scientific classification
- Kingdom: Animalia
- Phylum: Arthropoda
- Subphylum: Chelicerata
- Class: Arachnida
- Order: Araneae
- Infraorder: Araneomorphae
- Family: Theridiidae
- Genus: Parasteatoda
- Species: P. tepidariorum

Binomial name
- Parasteatoda tepidariorum (C. L. Koch, 1841)

Synonyms
- Theridion pallidum Walckenaer, 1841; Theridium tepidariorum C. L. Koch, 1841; Theridion vulgare Hentz, 1850; Steatoda tepidariorum Thorell, 1856; Theridion tepidariorum Blackwall, 1864; Theridium marmoreum Holmberg, 1876; Theridium tepidatorium Keyserling, 1884; Theridion marmoreum Urquhart, 1886; Theridium varium Urquhart, 1886; Theridion sisyphoides Simon, 1914; Theridion sericum Saitō, 1933; Achaearanea tepidariorum Levi, 1955

= Parasteatoda tepidariorum =

Species of spider

Parasteatoda tepidariorum, the common house spider or American house spider, is a spider species of the genus Parasteatoda with a cosmopolitan distribution. Common house spiders are synanthropic and live in and near human dwellings. Their prey mechanism is similar to that of the other cobweb spiders: the spider follows disturbances transmitted along the web to entangle and then paralyze its prey, which usually consists of household insects and other invertebrates (often considered as pests).

== Distribution ==
Parasteatoda tepidariorum is native to Asia but has been introduced to Canada, the USA, South America, Europe, Morocco, Turkey, the Caucasus, Russia (Europe to Far East), Saint Helena, South Africa, the Seychelles, New Zealand, and Hawaii.

In South Africa, the species has been sampled from the provinces Gauteng, Eastern Cape, and Western Cape. Notable locations include Mountain Zebra National Park and Robben Island.

== Habitat and ecology ==
This species constructs three-dimensional webs in dark corners and is frequently found around buildings.

In South Africa, Parasteatoda tepidariorum inhabits areas at altitudes from 1246 to 1513 m above sea level and has been sampled from the Fynbos, Nama Karoo, and Savanna biomes.

== Description ==
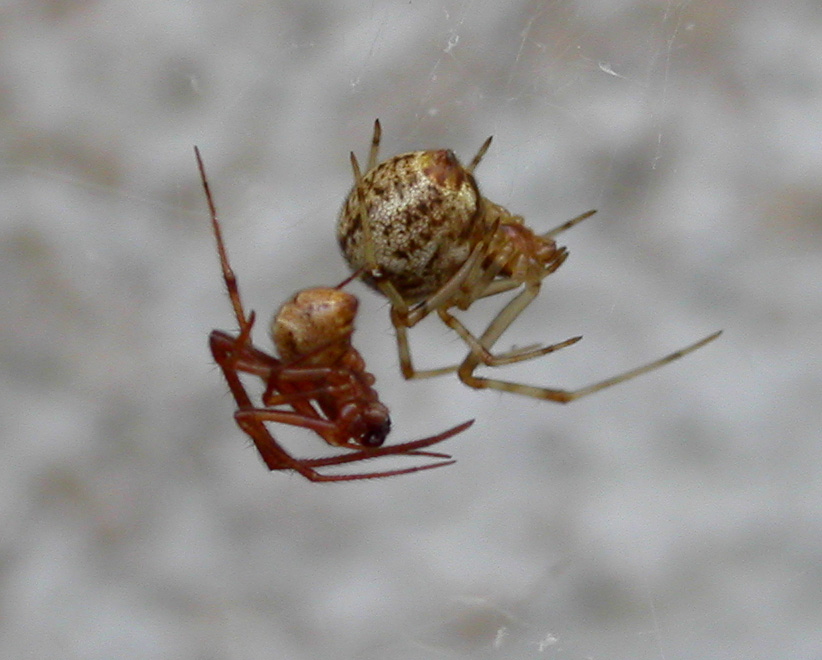
A male and female (the female is the larger of the two)

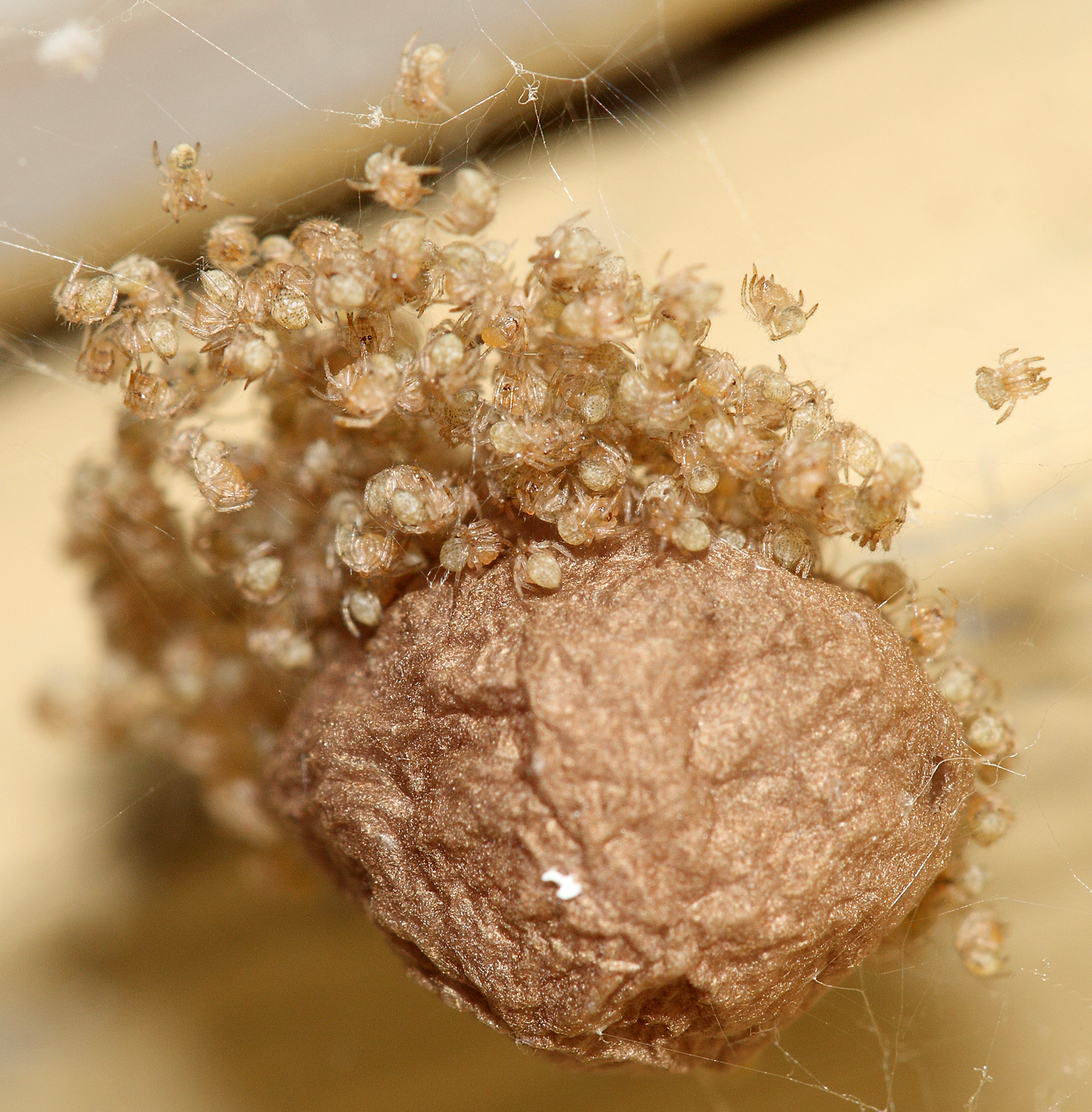
Hatched P. tepidariorum spiderlings

=== Appearance ===
Common house spiders are variable in color from tan to nearly black, frequently with patterns of differing shades on their body. Females are generally between 5 and 6 millimetres (0.20 and 0.24 in) long, and males are generally between 3.8 and 4.7 millimetres (0.15 and 0.19 in) long. They can be an inch (2.5 cm) or more across with legs outspread. The average female body mass is about 37.7 mg. P. tepidariorum is similar in body shape to widow spiders. Males have a less bulbous abdomen than females. Common house spiders' size and coloration allow the spiders to blend into the background and escape notice.

=== Life cycle ===
This species can live for more than a year after reaching maturity. Females suspend their egg sacs in their webs; the spherical egg sacs have a tan papery outer layer. Females produce clutches containing mean of 149 eggs. Each egg measures about 0.59 mm in diameter and weighs around 0.12 mg. The spiderlings remain in the mother's web for several days after coming out of the egg sac.

=== Diet and predation ===
Common house spiders usually feed on small insects and household pests. If the prey is too agile, the spider will try shooting web at it from a distance before pulling the thread toward itself. Bigger females can also attract baby skinks inside their web by leaving fly remains hanging in it. Once its food dries out, the spider usually drops it to the floor in order to free space in its web, instead of destroying and rebuilding it or changing its location.

Three spider species usually prey upon them: the pirate spiders of the genus Mimetus (Mimetidae), as well as two jumping spider species – Phidippus variegatus and Platycryptus undatus. The latter one often falls prey to its own food when it gets trapped in the tangling web after missing the jump on its target.

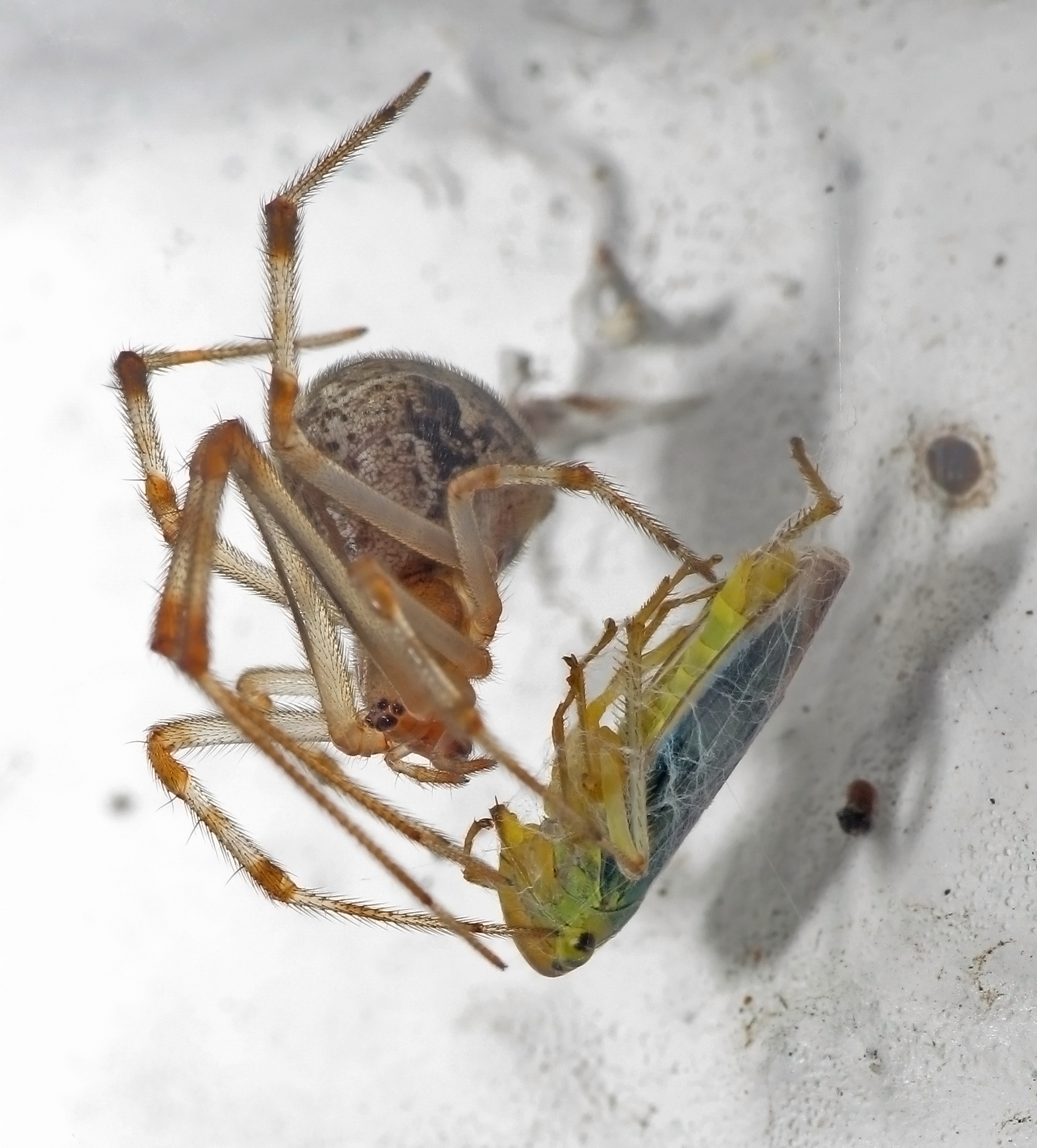
Female eating a Green Leafhopper (Cicadella viridis)

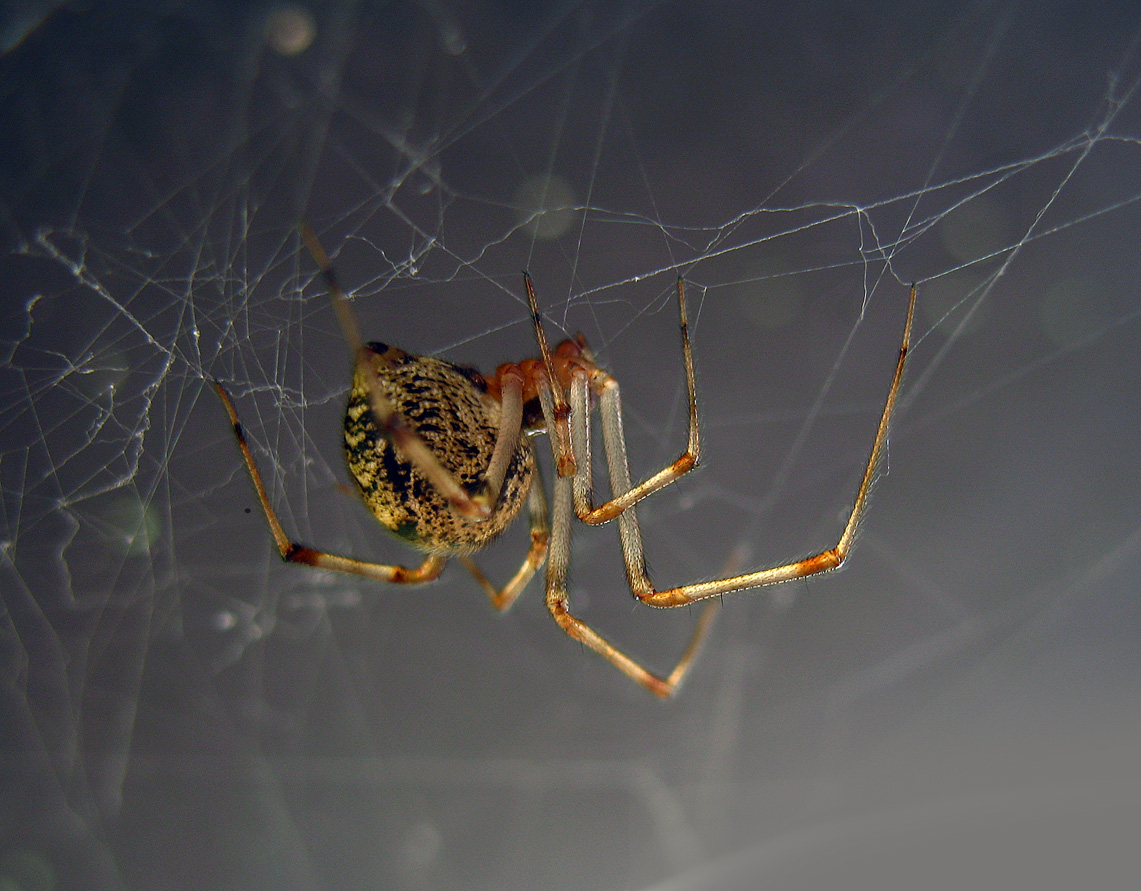
Closeup of a female P. tepidariorum

The assassin bug Stenolemus lanipes (Emesinae) apparently feeds exclusively on spiderlings of this species, but can also become prey of the adult spider.

== Behavior ==
=== Interaction with other spiders ===
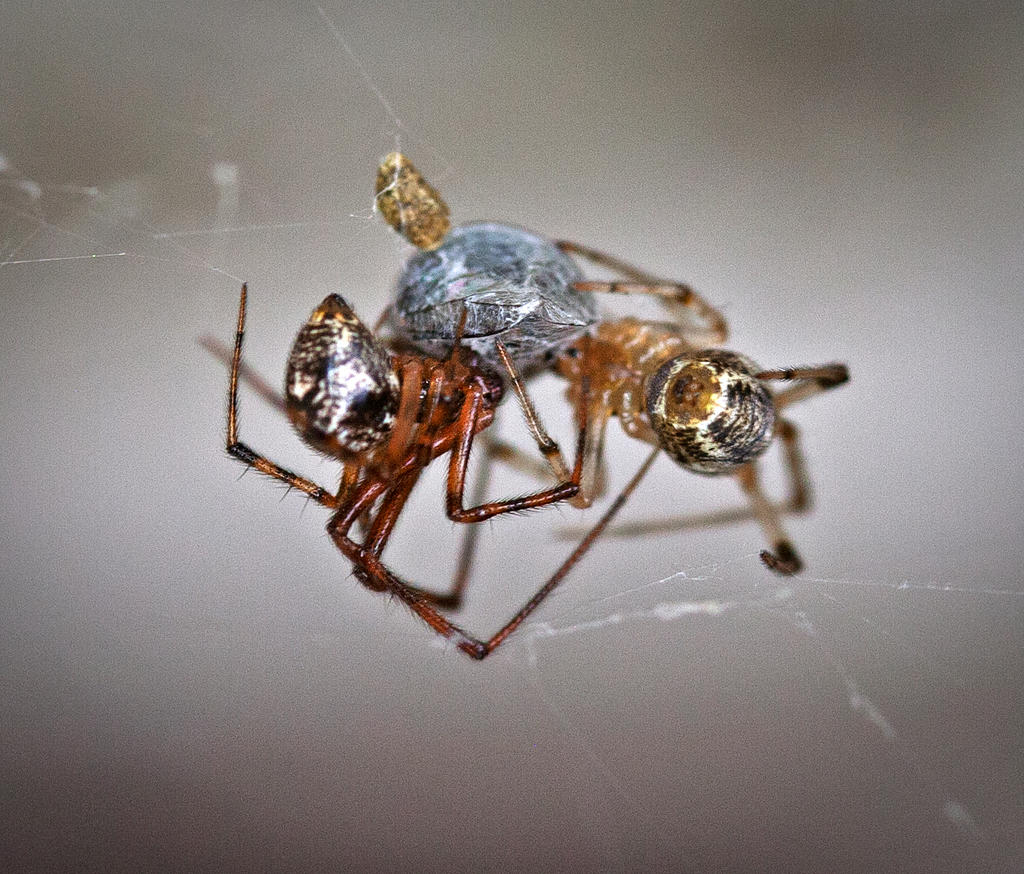
American house spider (Parasteatoda tepidariorum) male and female sharing a meal

A male and female often share the same web for long periods, and several females often build their webs in close proximity. However, females will sometimes fight when they encounter each other.

=== Interaction with humans and predators ===
As these spiders live in constant proximity to humans, they are not usually aggressive and will even let a human hand approach their web.

Common house spiders prioritize escape, and bite humans only in self-defense, when grabbed and squeezed.

Common house spiders possess poor vision and cannot detect any movement more than three to four inches away. When they detect movement (such as vibrations from a vacuum cleaner), they retreat to secure hiding place until the disruption is gone. If cornered, they will feign death as last resort.

=== Toxicity ===
Common house spiders have neurotoxic venom. However, their bites are less severe than that of other theridiids and are "not known to be dangerous to humans".

== Subspecies ==
Subspecies include P. tepidariorum australis (common gray house spider).

== See also ==
- House spider (listing other spiders known as "house spiders")
