= Polauchenia protentor =

Scientific classification
- Domain: Eukaryota
- Kingdom: Animalia
- Phylum: Arthropoda
- Class: Insecta
- Order: Hemiptera
- Suborder: Heteroptera
- Family: Reduviidae
- Genus: Polauchenia
- Species: P. protentor

Binomial name
- Polauchenia protentor McAtee & Malloch, 1925

Species of true bug

Polauchenia protentor is a species of thread-legged bug (Emesinae), recorded from Panama and a Colombian tropical dry forest on the Caribbean coast.
