= Oonops procerus =

Scientific classification
- Kingdom: Animalia
- Phylum: Arthropoda
- Subphylum: Chelicerata
- Class: Arachnida
- Order: Araneae
- Infraorder: Araneomorphae
- Family: Oonopidae
- Genus: Oonops
- Species: O. procerus

Binomial name
- Oonops procerus Simon, 1882

Species of spider

Oonops procerus is a spider species found in France and Spain.
