= Oonops amoenus =

Scientific classification
- Kingdom: Animalia
- Phylum: Arthropoda
- Subphylum: Chelicerata
- Class: Arachnida
- Order: Araneae
- Infraorder: Araneomorphae
- Family: Oonopidae
- Genus: Oonops
- Species: O. amoenus

Binomial name
- Oonops amoenus Dalmas, 1916

Species of spider

Oonops amoenus is a spider species found in France.
