= Chinemesa =

Scientific classification
- Kingdom: Animalia
- Phylum: Arthropoda
- Clade: Pancrustacea
- Class: Insecta
- Order: Hemiptera
- Suborder: Heteroptera
- Family: Reduviidae
- Tribe: Emesini
- Genus: Chinemesa; Wygodzinsky, 1966

Genus of true bugs

Chinemesa is a genus of thread-legged assassin bugs earlier thought to be endemic to Borneo until other species were found in southern China.Three species were described by Wygodzinsky who erected the genus in 1966.

== Species list ==
- Chinemesa feminata Wygodzinsky, 1966
- Chinemesa murudiana Wygodzinsky, 1966
- Chinemesa poiana Wygodzinsky, 1966
- Chinemesa uniannulata Redei, 2007
- Chinemesa ornata Chen, Li & Cai, 2026
- Chinemesa pulchella Chen, Li & Cai, 2026
- Chinemesa weilingfengi Chen, Li & Cai, 2026
