= Stenolemoides =

Scientific classification
- Kingdom: Animalia
- Phylum: Arthropoda
- Clade: Pancrustacea
- Class: Insecta
- Order: Hemiptera
- Suborder: Heteroptera
- Family: Reduviidae
- Subfamily: Emesinae
- Tribe: Emesini
- Genus: Stenolemoides; McAtee & Malloch, 1925

Genus of true bugs

Stenolemoides is a genus of thread-legged bugs in the family Reduviidae. There are at least three described species in Stenolemoides.

== Species ==
These three species belong to the genus Stenolemoides:

- Stenolemoides arizonensis (Banks, 1909)
- Stenolemoides brasiliensis Wygodzinsky, 1947
- Stenolemoides oliveirai Wygodzinsky, 1966
