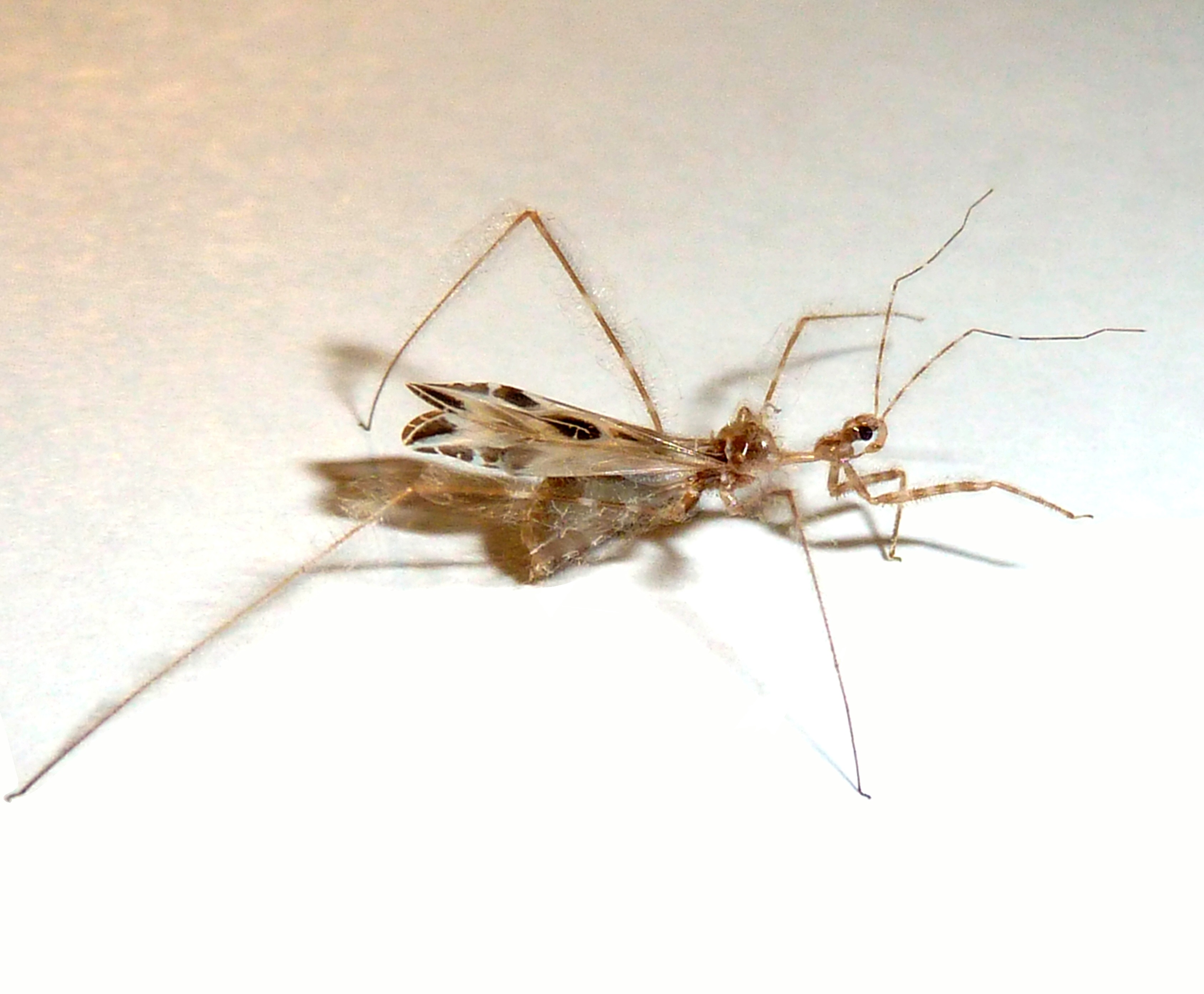

Scientific classification
- Domain: Eukaryota
- Kingdom: Animalia
- Phylum: Arthropoda
- Class: Insecta
- Order: Hemiptera
- Suborder: Heteroptera
- Family: Reduviidae
- Tribe: Emesini
- Genus: Stenolemus; Signoret, 1858

= Stenolemus =

Genus of true bugs

Stenolemus is a genus of thread-legged bug (Emesinae). Species of this genus are noted for preying on spiders.

== Species ==
There are many species in the genus Stenolemus, including:

- Stenolemus alikakay Redei & Tsai, 2010^{g}
- Stenolemus annulatus^{g}
- Stenolemus atkinsoni Distant, 1903
- Stenolemus bituberus Stål, 1874
- Stenolemus crassirostris Stål, 1871^{g}
- Stenolemus edwardsii
- Stenolemus fraterculus Wygodzinsky, 1956^{g}
- Stenolemus giraffa
- Stenolemus greeni
- Stenolemus griveaudi Villiers, 1970^{g}
- Stenolemus hirtipes
- Stenolemus lanipes Wygodzinsky, 1949^{i c g b}
- Stenolemus lenti Espínola & Silva, 1963
- Stenolemus longicornis (Blatchley, 1925)^{i c g}
- Stenolemus novaki Horváth, 1888^{g}
- Stenolemus pallidipennis McAtee and Malloch, 1925^{i c g}
- Stenolemus schwarzii Bergroth, 1916^{i c g b}
- Stenolemus spiniventris Signoret, 1858^{i c g b}
- Stenolemus susainathani Wygodzinsky, 1966

Data sources: i = ITIS, c = Catalogue of Life, g = GBIF, b = Bugguide.net
