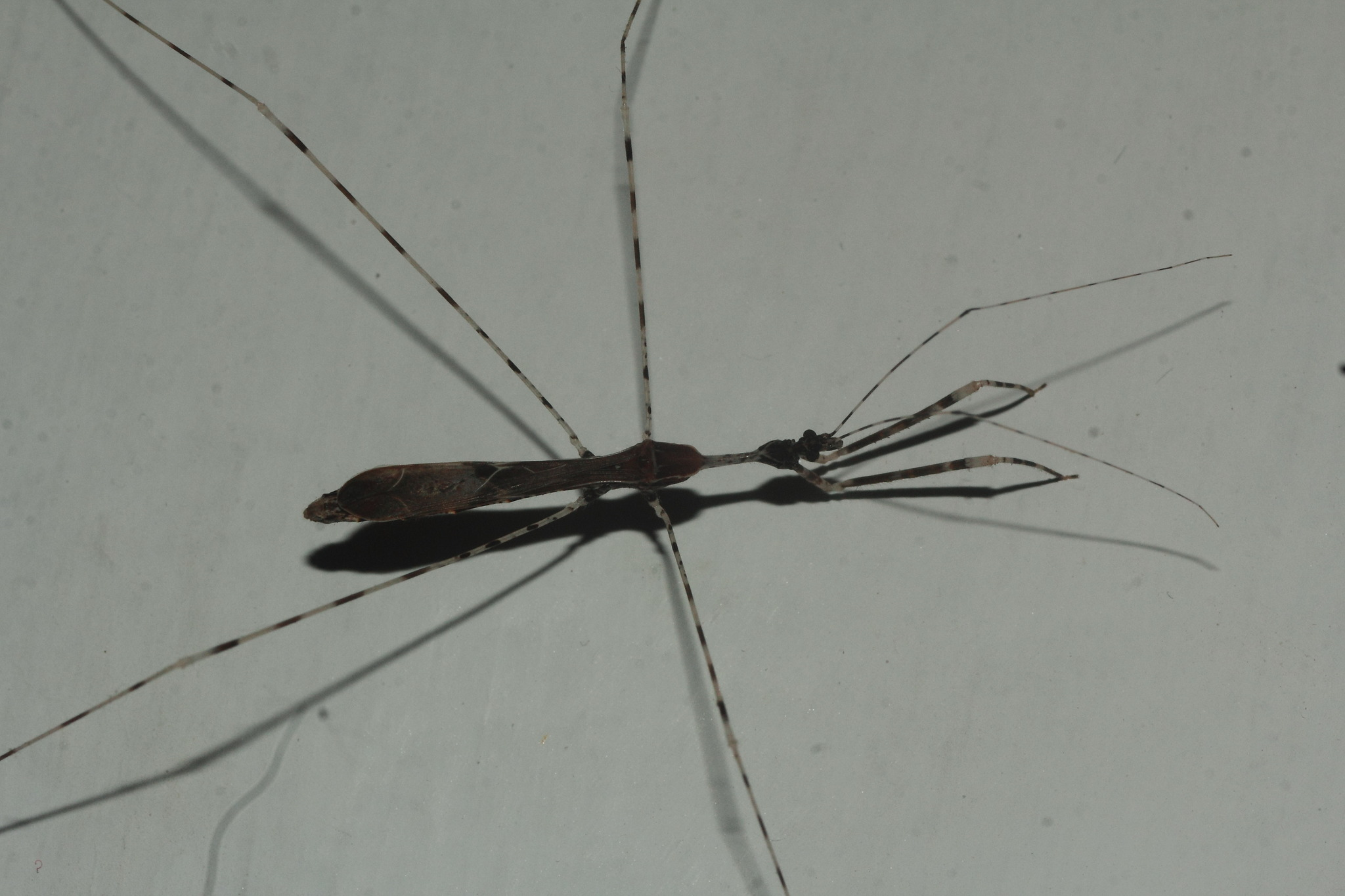
- Emesa annulata, México

Scientific classification
- Kingdom: Animalia
- Phylum: Arthropoda
- Class: Insecta
- Order: Hemiptera
- Suborder: Heteroptera
- Family: Reduviidae
- Subfamily: Emesinae
- Tribe: Emesini
- Genus: Emesa; Fabricius, 1803

Synonyms
- Emasa Léthierry & Severin, 1896

= Emesa (bug) =

Genus of true bugs

Emesa is a genus of thread-legged bugs in the family Reduviidae. There are about seven described species in Emesa, found in the Americas.

== Species ==
These seven species belong to the genus Emesa:

- Emesa annulata (Dohrn, 1860)
- Emesa corsicensis Scott, 1874
- Emesa mantis (Fabricius, 1794)
- Emesa mourei Wygodzinsky, 1946
- Emesa spec (Dohrn, 1860) Dohrn, 1860
- Emesa tenerrima (Dohrn, 1860)
- Emesa wahlbergi Stål, 1855
