= Oonops hasselti =

Scientific classification
- Kingdom: Animalia
- Phylum: Arthropoda
- Subphylum: Chelicerata
- Class: Arachnida
- Order: Araneae
- Infraorder: Araneomorphae
- Family: Oonopidae
- Genus: Oonops
- Species: O. hasselti

Binomial name
- Oonops hasselti Strand, 1906

Species of spider

Oonops hasselti is a spider species found in Scandinavia.
