= Stenolemus lanipes =

Scientific classification
- Kingdom: Animalia
- Phylum: Arthropoda
- Class: Insecta
- Order: Hemiptera
- Suborder: Heteroptera
- Family: Reduviidae
- Genus: Stenolemus
- Species: S. lanipes

Binomial name
- Stenolemus lanipes Wygodzinsky, 1949

Species of true bug

Stenolemus lanipes is a species of thread-legged bug (Emesinae).

This species feeds on spiders, especially spiderlings of Parasteatoda tepidariorum. Stenolemus lanipes will not feed upon other insects (such as Drosophila) placed upon a web, even to the point of starvation.
