= Gardena insperata =

Scientific classification
- Domain: Eukaryota
- Kingdom: Animalia
- Phylum: Arthropoda
- Class: Insecta
- Order: Hemiptera
- Suborder: Heteroptera
- Family: Reduviidae
- Genus: Gardena
- Species: G. insperata

Binomial name
- Gardena insperata Putshkov, 1988

Species of true bug

Gardena insperata is a thread-legged bug species from the genus Gardena. It is found in Tajikistan and Afghanistan.
