= Oonops tubulatus =

Scientific classification
- Kingdom: Animalia
- Phylum: Arthropoda
- Subphylum: Chelicerata
- Class: Arachnida
- Order: Araneae
- Infraorder: Araneomorphae
- Family: Oonopidae
- Genus: Oonops
- Species: O. tubulatus

Binomial name
- Oonops tubulatus Dalmas, 1916

Species of spider

Oonops tubulatus is a spider species found in Portugal and Algeria.
