= Stenolemus bituberus =

Scientific classification
- Kingdom: Animalia
- Phylum: Arthropoda
- Clade: Pancrustacea
- Class: Insecta
- Order: Hemiptera
- Suborder: Heteroptera
- Family: Reduviidae
- Genus: Stenolemus
- Species: S. bituberus

Binomial name
- Stenolemus bituberus Stål, 1874

Species of true bug

Stenolemus bituberus is a species of thread-legged insect (Emesinae) found across much of Australia. This species spends nearly its entire life (moulting, feeding, mating) in spider webs. It preys upon a variety of spiders, including webs and nests of spiders of Achaearanea, Badumna, Pholcus, and Stiphidion, and the families Salticidae and Uloboridae. This species is found in a broader diversity of spider webs than any other species in Stenolemus.

== Behavior ==
Stenolemus bituberus has two attack methods: stalking and luring. Stalking involves the slow approach of S. bituberus to a prey, followed by a period of tapping the prey with antennae (usually for an extended period of 3 minutes), and then suddenly stabbing the spider with its rostrum, or beak. "Luring" involves plucking of the strands of the spider web by S. bituberus. The prey comes over to investigate and S. bituberus again taps with antennae before stabbing with the rostrum.
