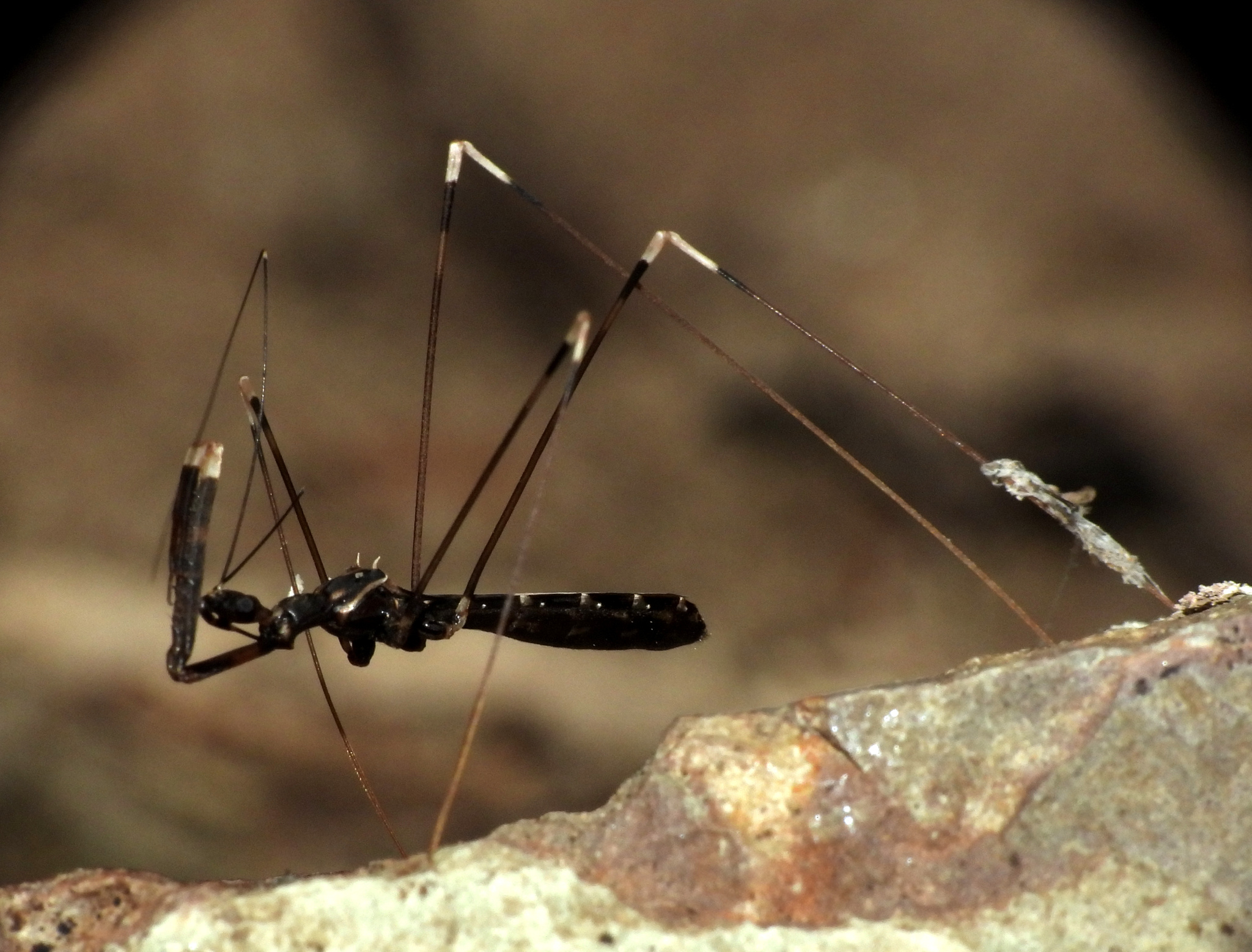

Scientific classification
- Kingdom: Animalia
- Phylum: Arthropoda
- Clade: Pancrustacea
- Class: Insecta
- Order: Hemiptera
- Suborder: Heteroptera
- Family: Reduviidae
- Tribe: Emesini
- Genus: Phasmatocoris; Breddin, 1904

= Phasmatocoris =

Genus of true bugs

Phasmatocoris is a little-known genus of thread-legged bug (Emesinae). Fourteen species have been described, including 3 from Colombia.

== Selected species ==
- Phasmatocoris labyrinthicus Pape, 2013
- Phasmatocoris magdalenae Wygodzinsky
- Phasmatocoris moraballi Wygodzinsky
- Phasmatocoris spectrum Breddin, 1904
- Phasmatocoris sturmi Wygodzinsky
- Phasmatocoris usingeri Wygodzinsky, 1966
- Phasmatocoris xavieri Gil-Santana 2007
