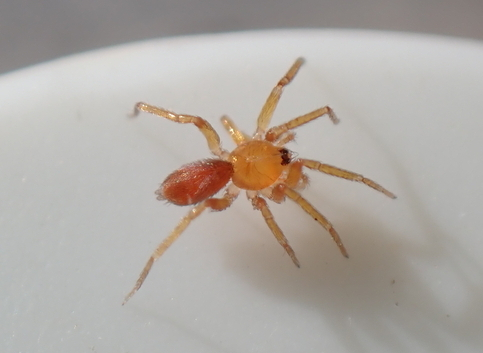
- Oonops pulcher in France
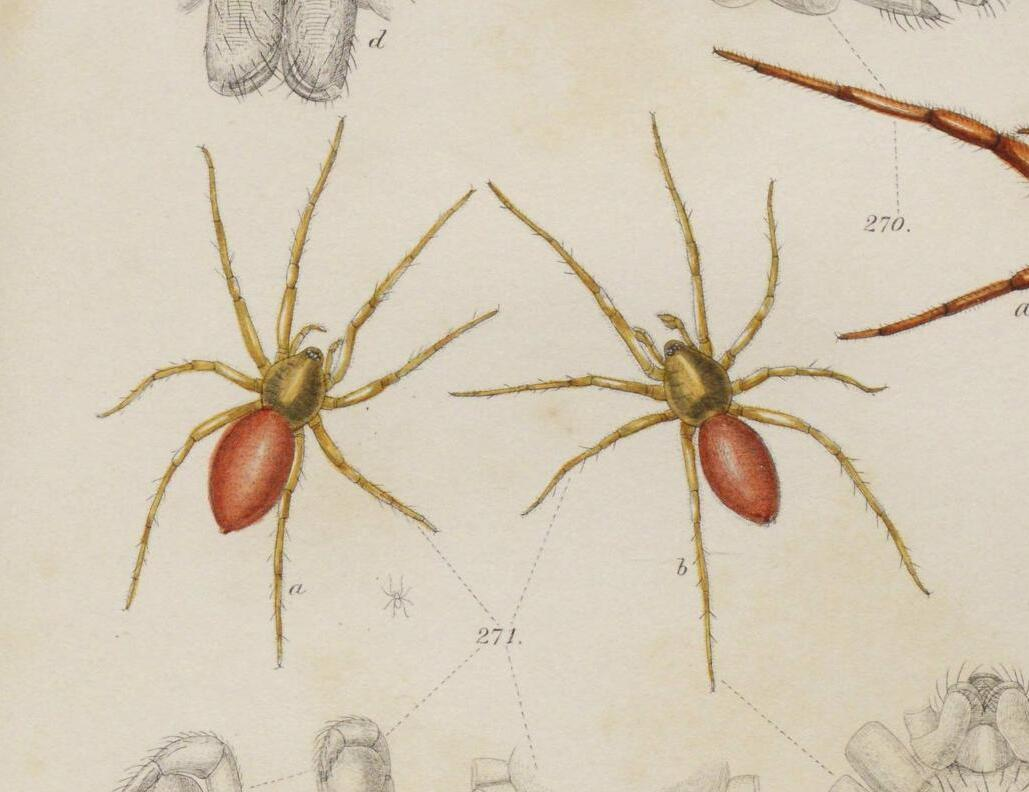

Scientific classification
- Kingdom: Animalia
- Phylum: Arthropoda
- Subphylum: Chelicerata
- Class: Arachnida
- Order: Araneae
- Infraorder: Araneomorphae
- Family: Oonopidae
- Genus: Oonops
- Species: O. pulcher

Binomial name
- Oonops pulcher Templeton, 1835
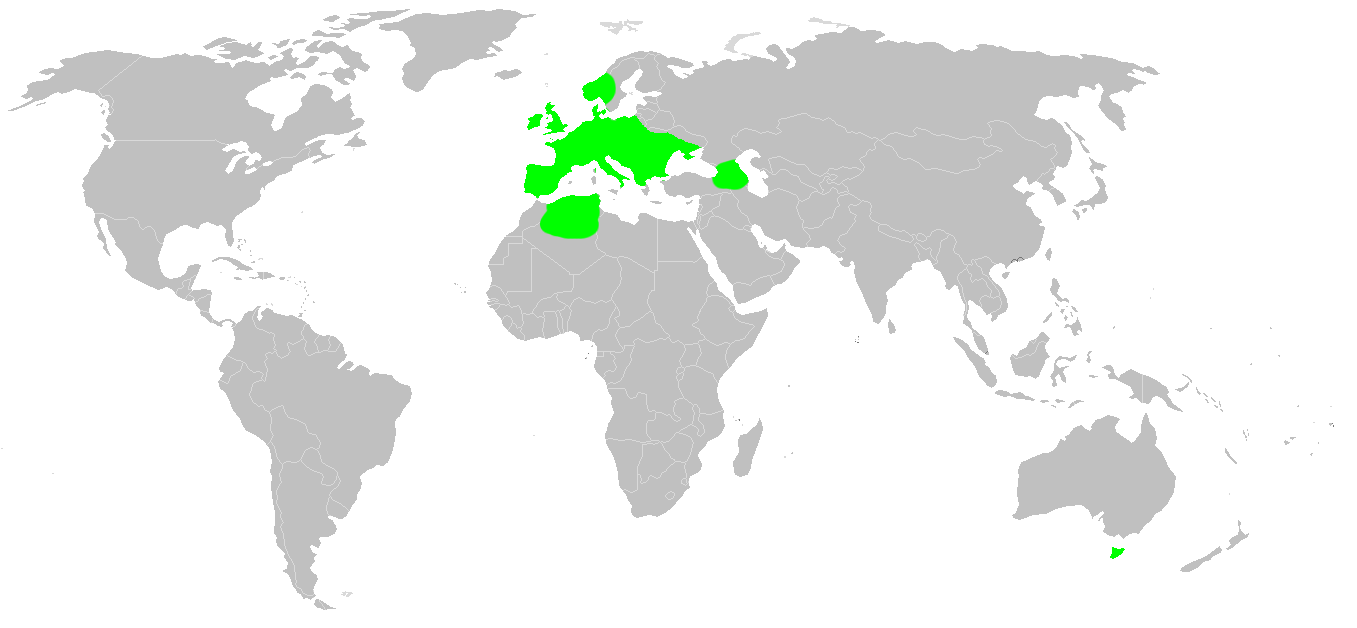

= Oonops pulcher =

Species of spider

Oonops pulcher is a tiny spider (males about 1½ mm, females 2 mm). Its six eyes are located closely together, giving the impression of only one eye. The spider is of a bleak light red, with a reddish to whitish abdomen, and found out of doors in bird nests, under stones and under tree bark, also in webs of Amaurobius and Coelotes (two spider genera from the family Amaurobiidae). Only two eggs are laid into a flat eggsac.

When moving it keeps its two front legs stretched forward as it moves very slowly for a few steps before accelerating.

It is very similar to the closely related O. domesticus, but has four tibial spine pairs instead of five. O. domesticus is only found in buildings.

Oonops pulcher has been identified from Europe to Ukraine, North Africa, and Tasmania, where it was introduced by man.

The subspecies Oonops pulcher hispanicus (Dalmas, 1916) is found in Spain.

== Name ==
The species name pulcher is Latin for "beautiful", referring to the oval eyes.
