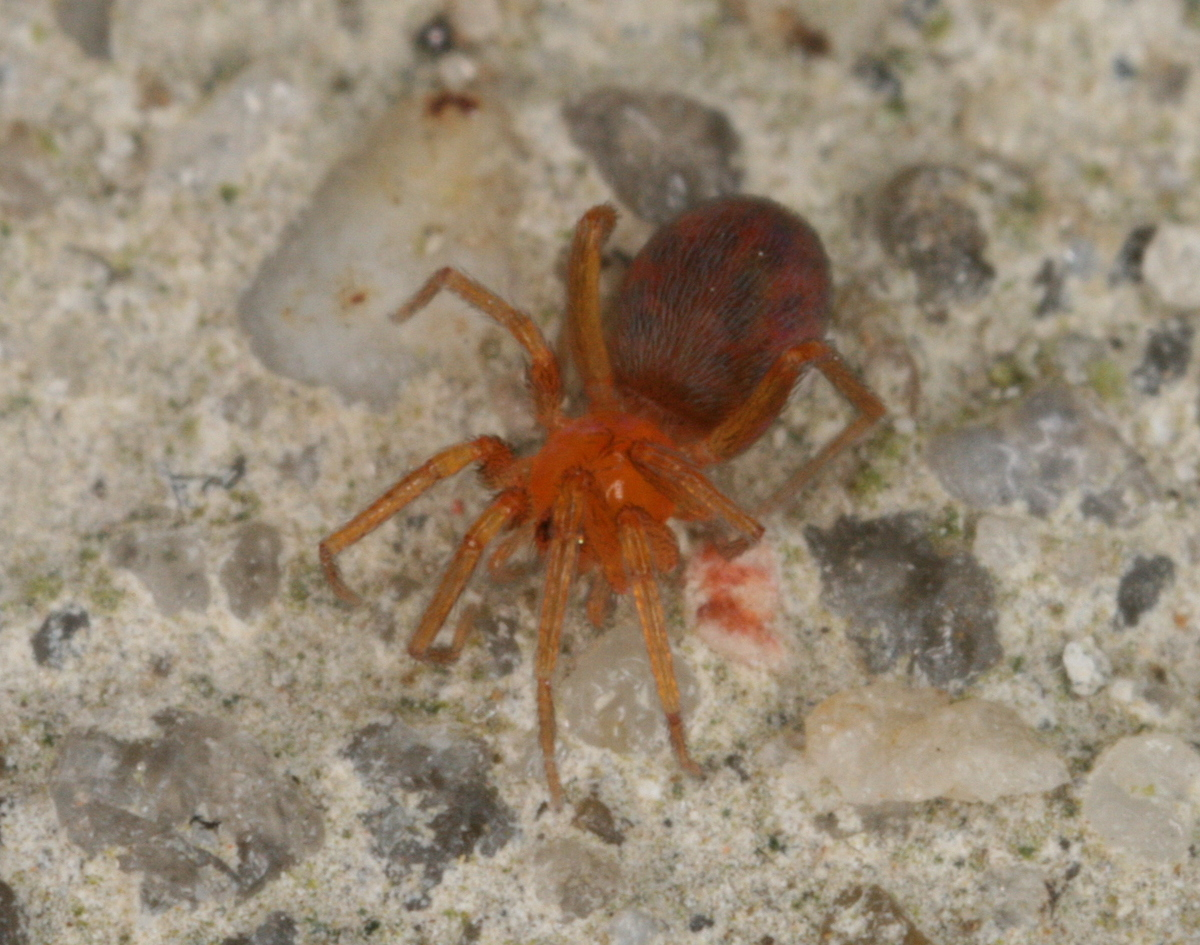
- O. domesticus in Denmark
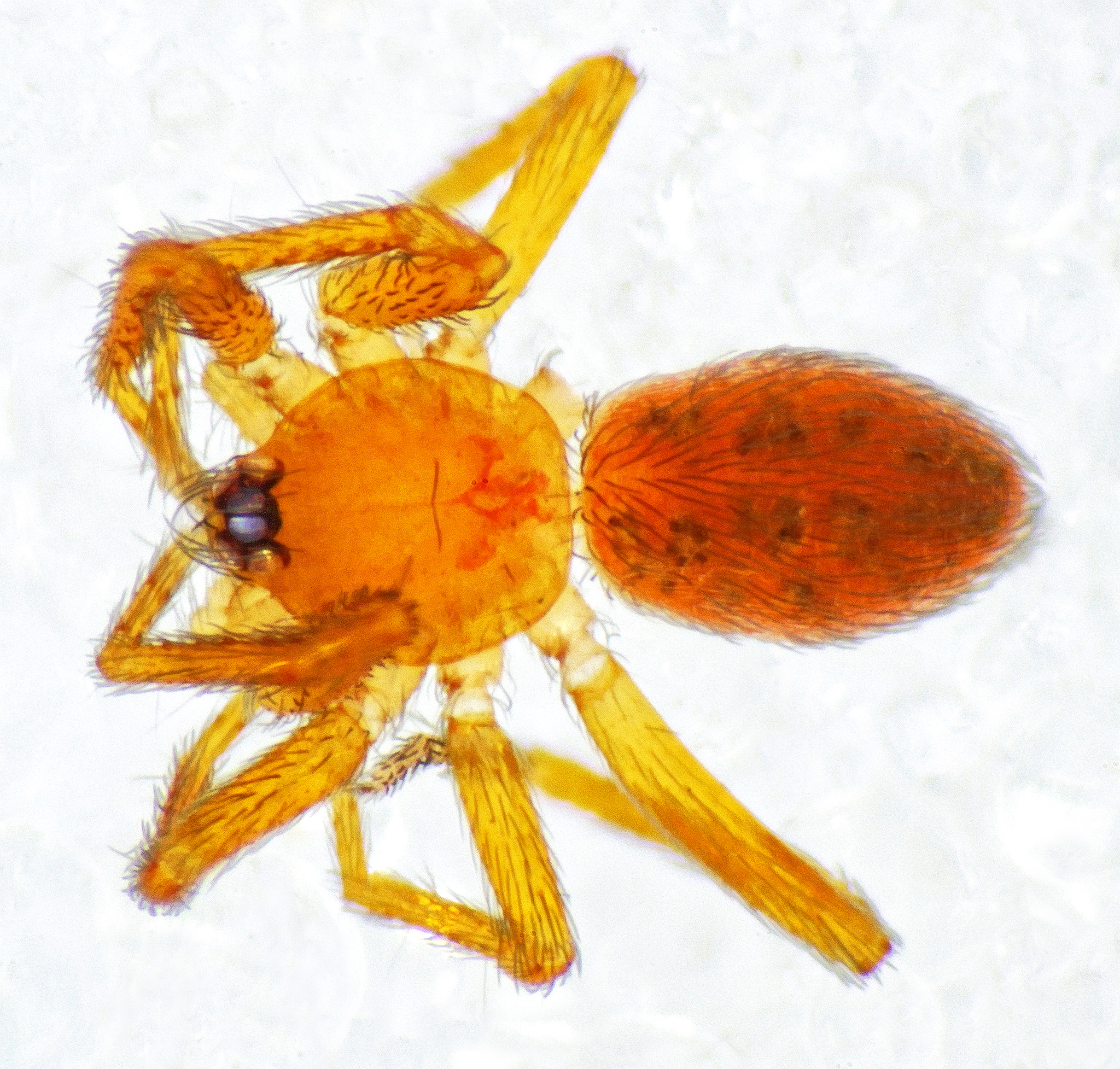
- Oonops domesticus in England

Scientific classification
- Kingdom: Animalia
- Phylum: Arthropoda
- Subphylum: Chelicerata
- Class: Arachnida
- Order: Araneae
- Infraorder: Araneomorphae
- Family: Oonopidae
- Genus: Oonops
- Species: O. domesticus

Binomial name
- Oonops domesticus Dalmas, 1916
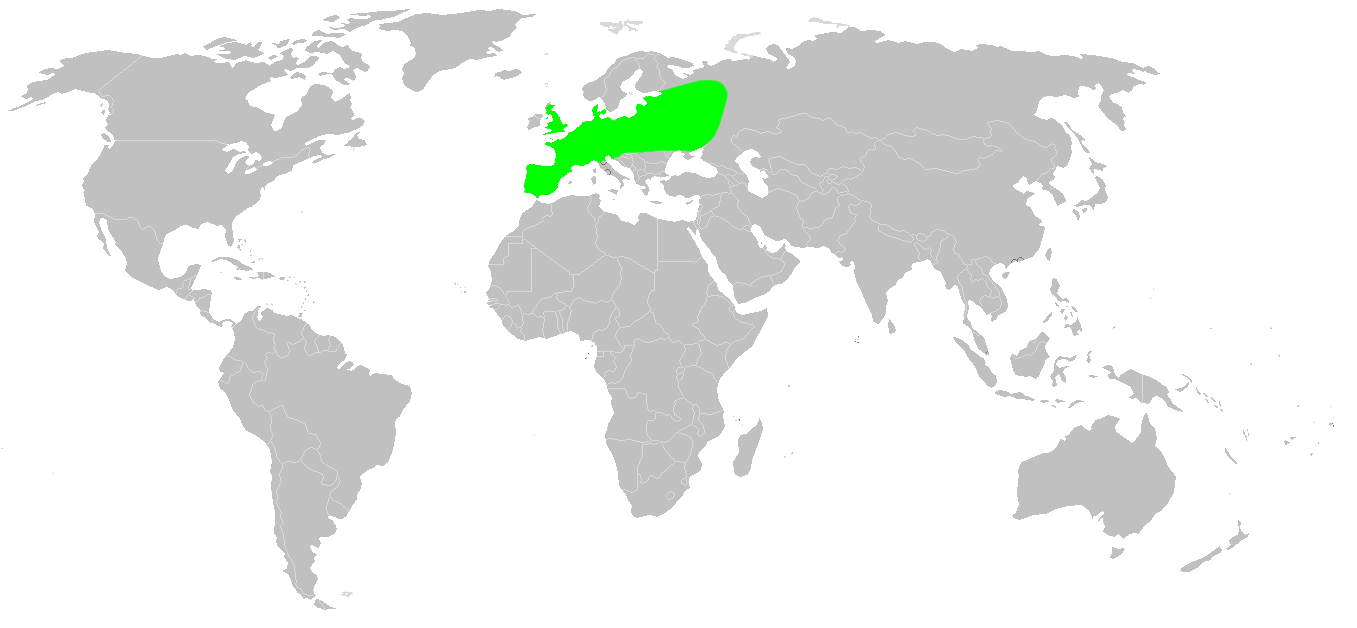

= Oonops domesticus =

Species of spider

Oonops domesticus is a tiny spider (males about 1.5 mm, females 2 mm) from Western Europe to Russia. It is a bleak light red, with a reddish to whitish abdomen. It is found only in buildings, where it builds a retreat in corners and between old paper. It hunts at night, probably with booklice as their common prey. Its translucent flat egg sacs contain only two eggs.

It is very similar to the closely related O. pulcher, but has five tibial spine pairs instead of four. O. pulcher is found outdoors.

== Name ==
The species name domesticus is Latin for "home".
