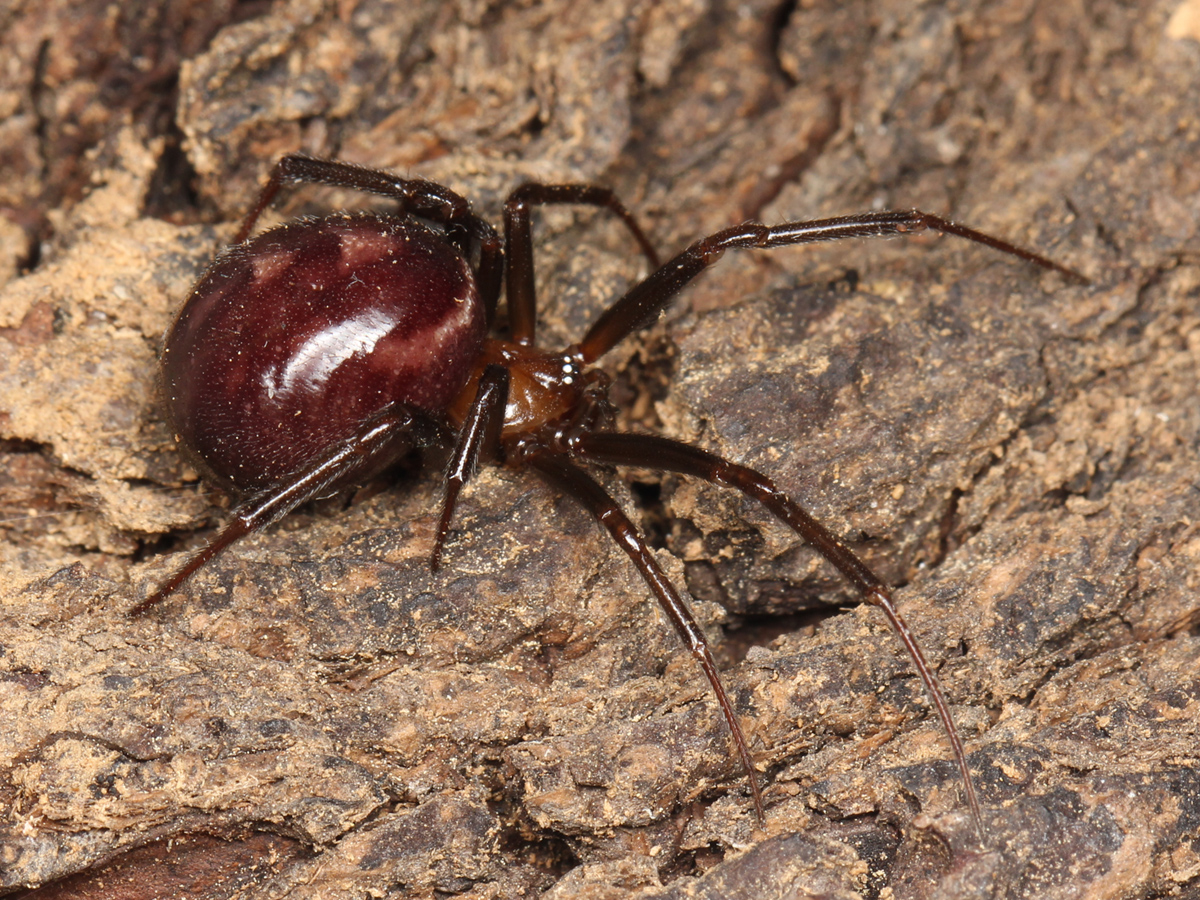
- Female
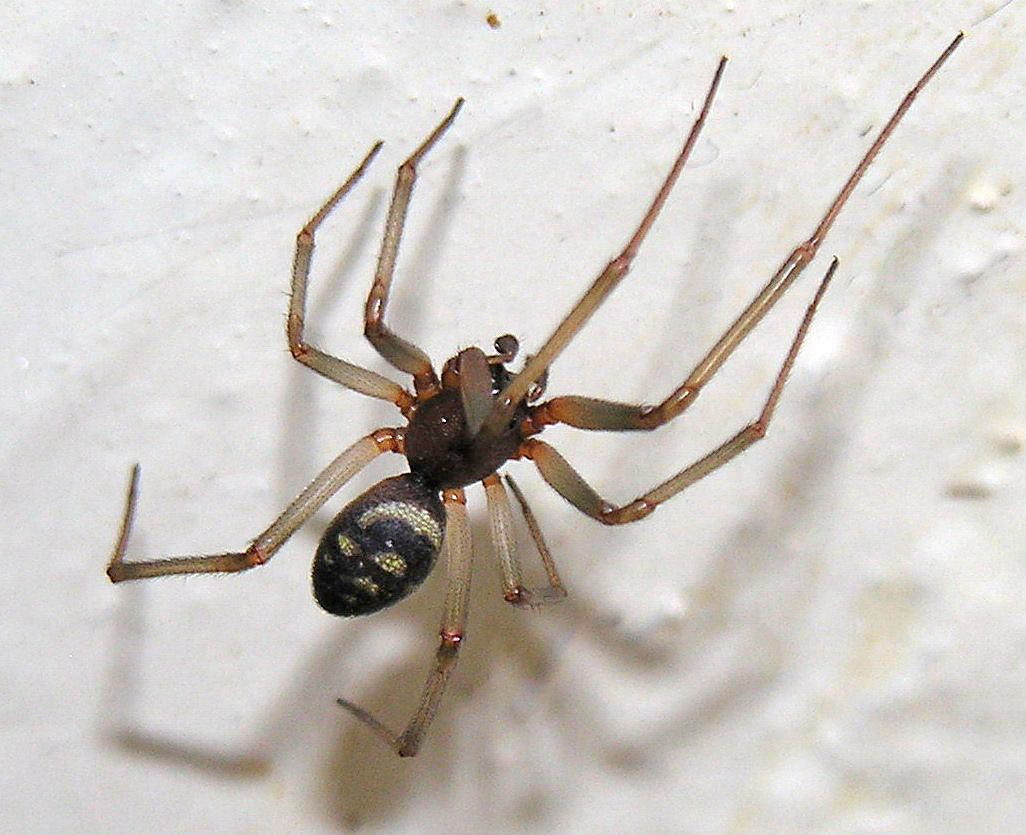
- Male

Scientific classification
- Kingdom: Animalia
- Phylum: Arthropoda
- Subphylum: Chelicerata
- Class: Arachnida
- Order: Araneae
- Infraorder: Araneomorphae
- Family: Theridiidae
- Genus: Steatoda
- Species: S. grossa

Binomial name
- Steatoda grossa (C. L. Koch, 1838)

Synonyms
- List of synonyms: Aranea nocturna Schrank, 1781; Theridion pulchellum Lucas, 1838; Theridium grossum C. L. Koch, 1838; Theridion versutum Blackwall, 1846; Eucharia zonata Ohlert, 1867; Theridion coeliferum L. Koch, 1867; Theridium grossa Blackwall, 1867; Theridium nicoluccii Canestrini & Pavesi, 1868; Steatoda versuta Thorell, 1870; Theridium coeliferum L. Koch, 1872; Steatoda pulchella Thorell, 1875; Theridium nitidum Holmberg, 1876; Theridium domesticum Holmberg, 1876; Lithyphantes grossus Pavesi, 1878; Steatoda pusulosa Keyserling, 1878; Teutana grossa Simon, 1881; Teutana nitida Keyserling, 1884; Teutana zonata Keyserling, 1884; Theridion sericum Urquhart, 1886; Asagena zonata F. O. Pickard-Cambridge, 1902; Theridion domesticum Fedotov, 1912; Steatoda punctilineata Mello-Leitão, 1939; Teutana modesta Bryant, 1948; Steatoda modesta Levi, 1962; Steatoda serica Roberts, 1995; Achaearanea tepidariorum Roberts, 1995

= Steatoda grossa =

Species of spider

Steatoda grossa, commonly known as the cupboard spider, the dark comb-footed spider, the brown house spider (in Australia), or the false widow or false black widow (though several other species are known by these names), is a common species of spider in the genus Steatoda.

As two of this spider's common names indicate, the spider superficially resembles, and is frequently confused for, the black widow and other venomous spiders in the genus Latrodectus.

== Distribution and habitat ==
S. grossa is a cosmopolitan species. It is native to Europe and much of temperate Asia. It has been introduced to North and South America, Macaronesia, Africa, New Zealand and Hawaii.

In South Africa, the species has been sampled from the Grassland, Fynbos, Nama Karoo, and Savanna biomes.

== Life style ==
Steatoda grossa constructs three-dimensional webs in dark places.

As is common with other members of the family Theridiidae, S. grossa constructs a cobweb, i.e. an irregular tangle of sticky silken fibers. As with other web weavers, these spiders have very poor eyesight and depend mostly on vibrations reaching them through their webs to orient themselves to prey or warn them of larger animals that could pose a danger. They are not aggressive, and most injuries to humans are due to defensive bites delivered when a spider gets unintentionally squeezed or pinched. It is possible that some bites may result when a spider mistakes a finger thrust into its web for its normal prey, but ordinarily intrusion by any large creature will cause these spiders to flee.

== Venom ==
The bite of S. grossa is minor in humans without any long-lasting effects. Symptoms of bites include blistering at the site of the bite and pain. A few cases with fever, nausea, sweating, and/or a general malaise lasting for several days. Latrodectus antivenom was shown to be effective in treating bites from Steatoda grossa after it was mistakenly administered to a S. grossa bite victim who was erroneously believed to have been bitten by the far more dangerous redback.

== Related species ==
A related species, commonly found in North America, is Steatoda borealis. This spider is similar to S. grossa in shape, but slightly smaller, and is generally found in colder climates. This spider can be identified by colored markings on the dorsal side of its abdomen rather than on the ventral side.

== Description ==
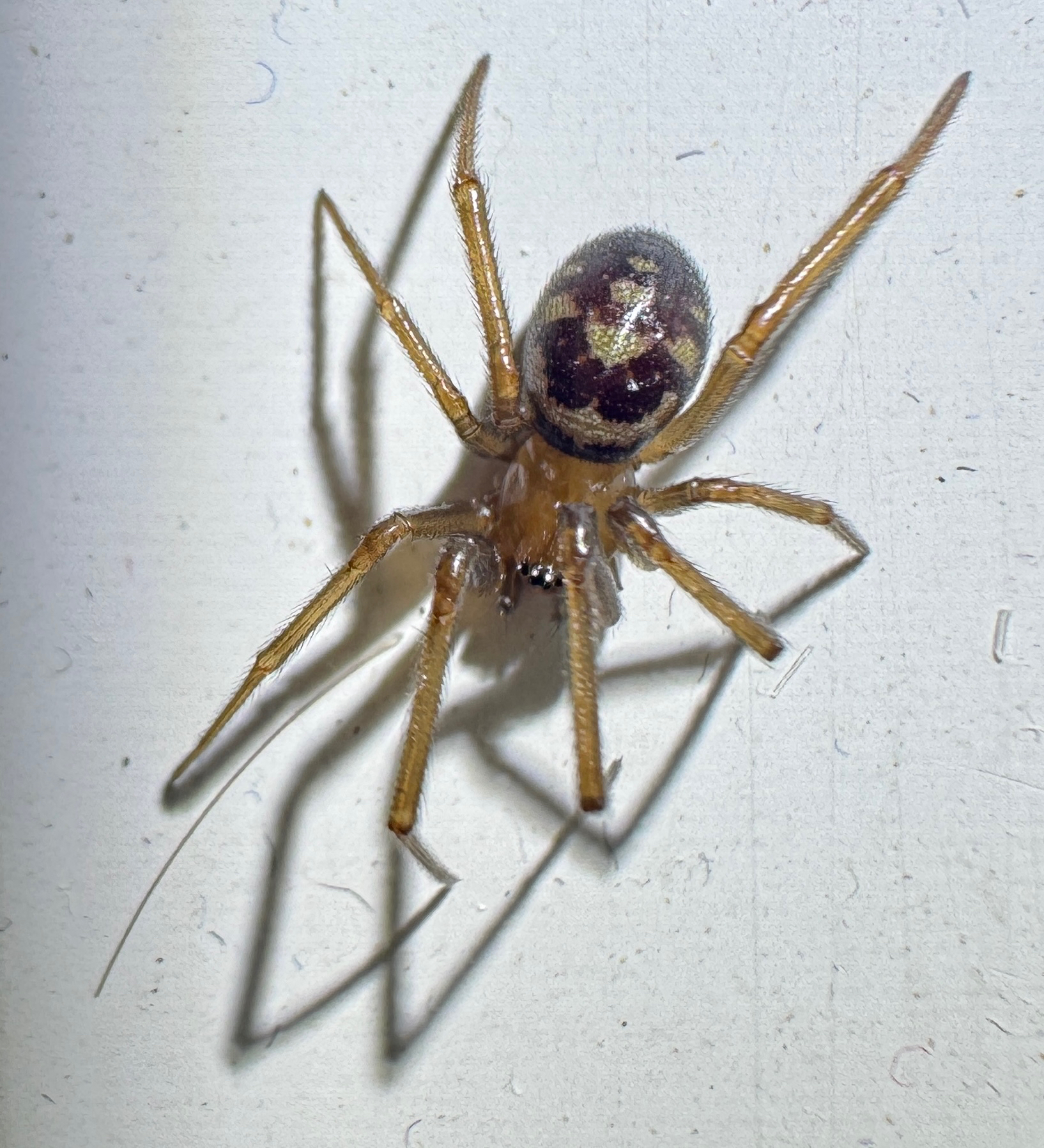
female

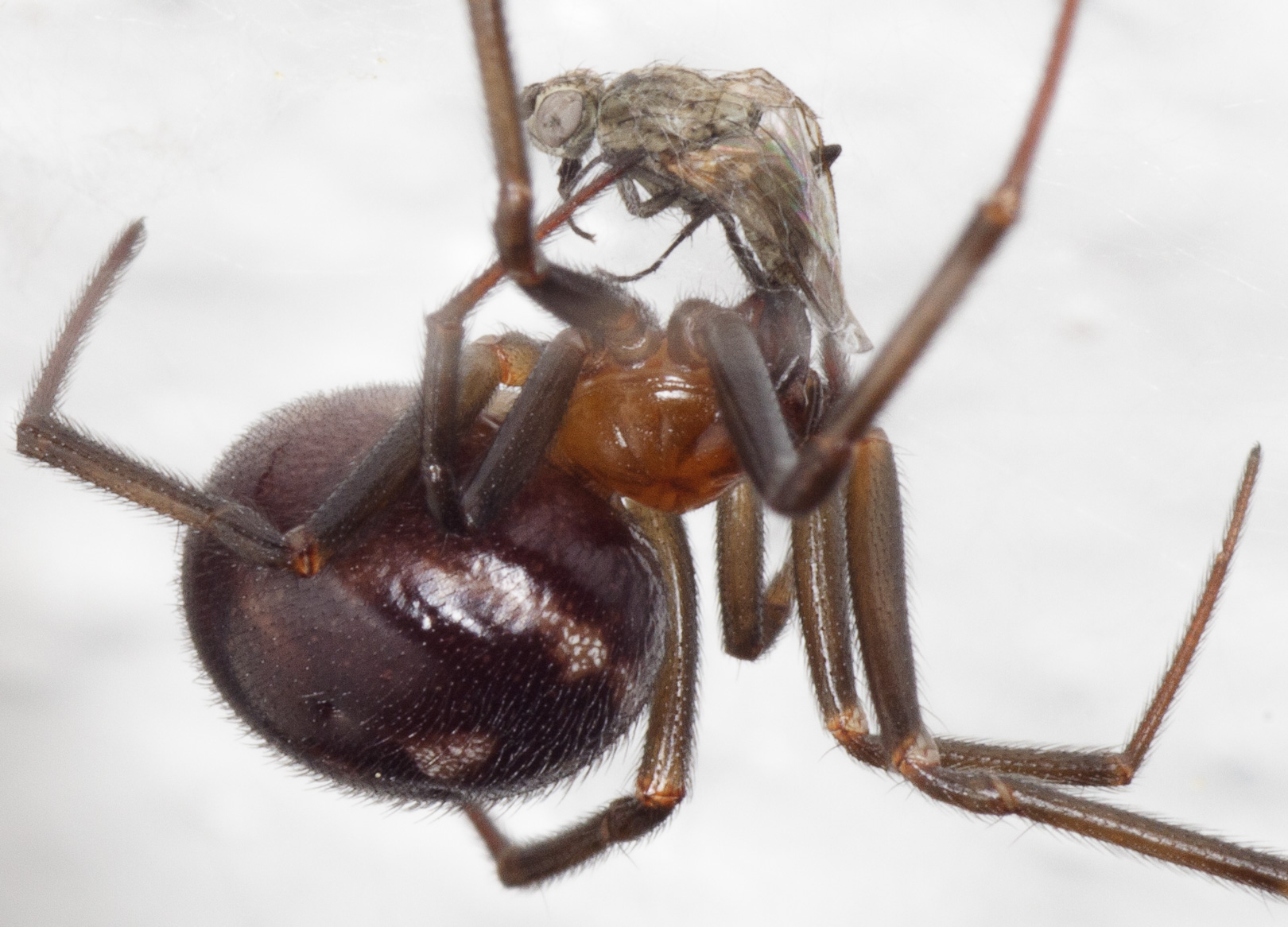
female with fly

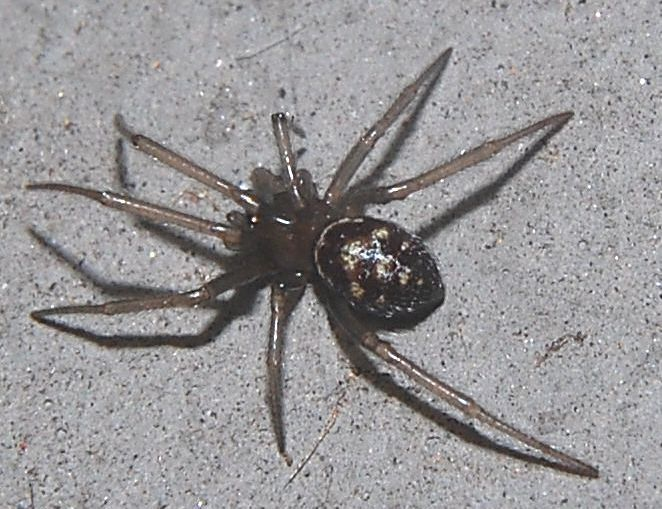
juvenile

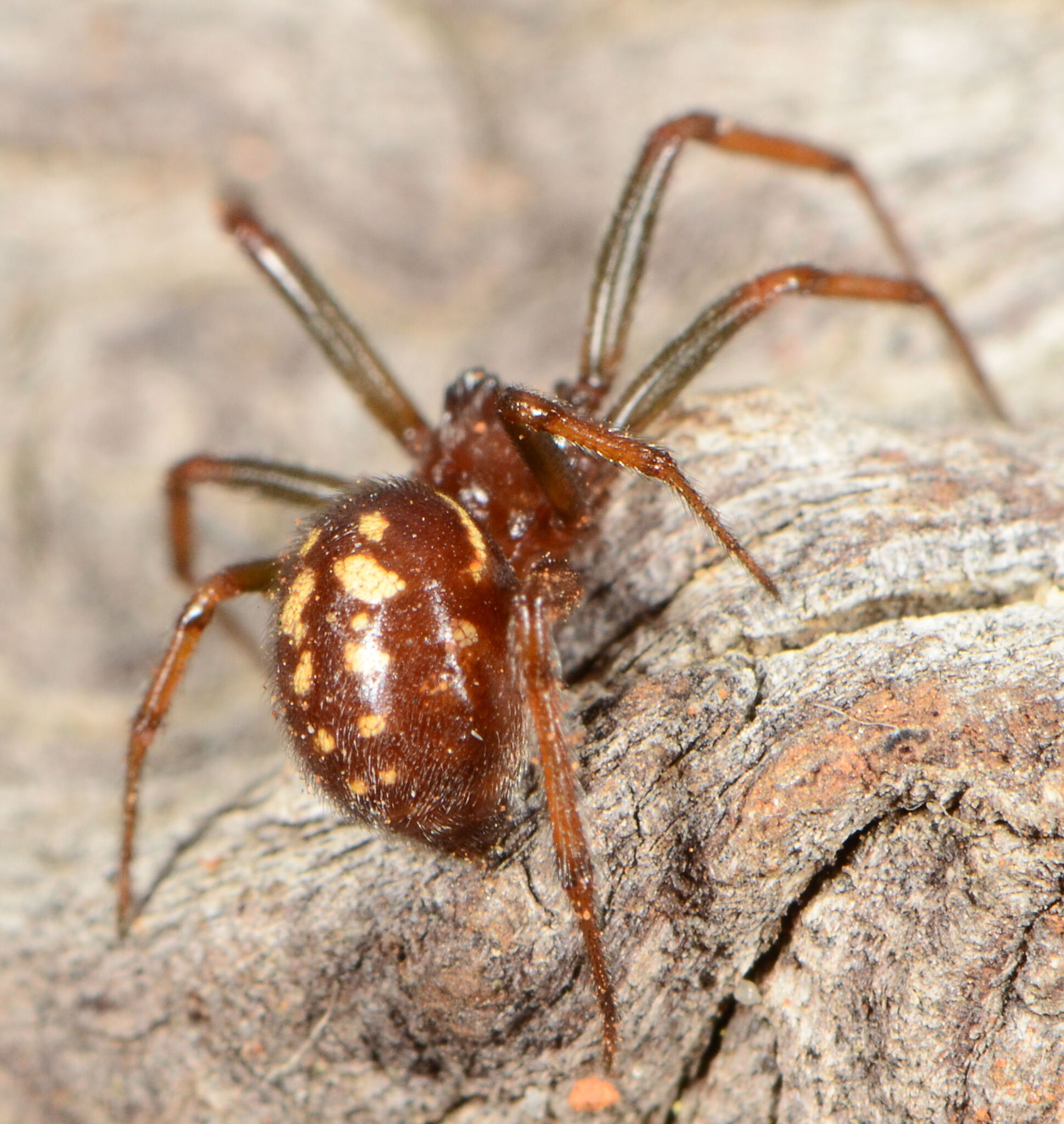
juvenile female

Like black widows, the female S. grossa is 6-10.5 mm in length and dark colored with a round, bulbous abdomen. Typical coloration ranges from purplish brown to black, with light-colored markings. Unlike black widows, redbacks, and other Latrodectus species, S. grossa does not have a bright red hourglass pattern or any other bright, distinctive markings. Like many spiders, the male is sometimes smaller but can many times be nearly as long as the females. It measures 4.1-10.0 mm in length and is thinner than the female. The two sexes are colored similarly; however, the sexually mature male almost always has lighter, more reddish-coloured legs than the female. S. grossa spiders may shed up to six times (instars) before reaching maturity. According to Charles Hogue (Insects of the Los Angeles Basin, 1993), it reportedly preys on black widows. They can go several months without feeding, provided they have access to water. A well-fed female can lay three or more egg sacs each year. Each egg sac typically contains between 40-100 eggs. The mother can often be observed watching her eggs for hours, even days, at a time once the eggs start changing color and grow close to hatching. At normal household temp/humidity, an egg will usually hatch within a month of being laid. The spiderlings are independent from time of hatch.

Female S. grossa spiders can live up to six years; the typical lifespan for the male is 1-1.5 years. Males often die shortly after mating.

== In popular culture ==
Steatoda grossa was selected by director Sam Raimi to represent the radioactive spider whose bite transforms Peter Parker in the 2002 movie Spider-Man. The spider used for filming was painted with red and blue makeup.
