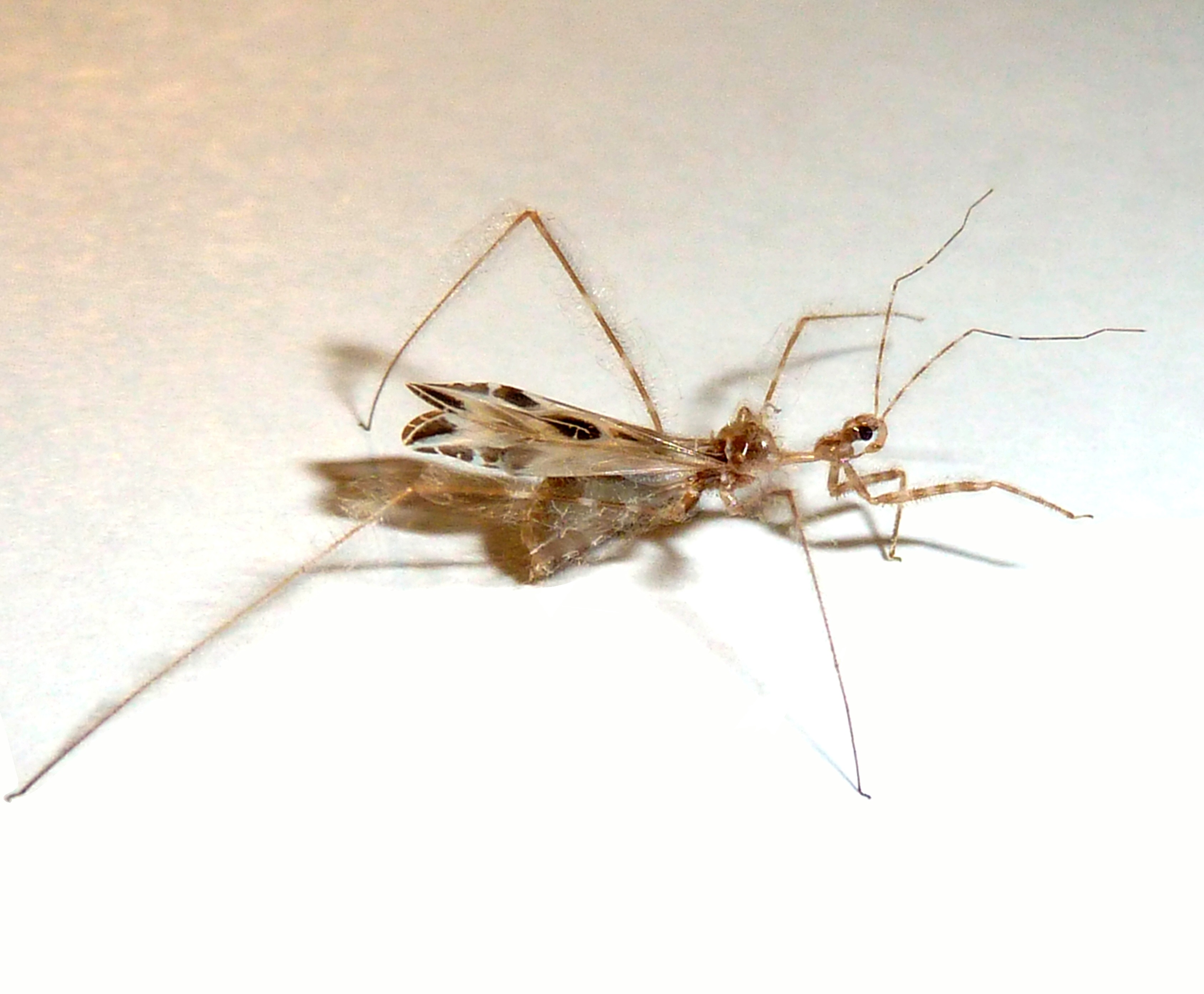
- Stenolemus sp.

Scientific classification
- Domain: Eukaryota
- Kingdom: Animalia
- Phylum: Arthropoda
- Class: Insecta
- Order: Hemiptera
- Suborder: Heteroptera
- Family: Reduviidae
- Subfamily: Emesinae
- Tribe: Emesini; Amyot and Serville, 1843

= Emesini =

Tribe of true bugs

The Emesini is a tribe of thread-legged bugs.

== Partial list of genera ==
- Chinemesa
- Emesa
- Eugubinus
- Gardena
- Myiophanes
- Phasmatocoris
- Polauchenia
- Stenolemus
- Stenolemoides
