= Nadine Dupérré =

Canadian arachnologist

Nadine Dupérré is a Canadian arachnologist and scientific illustrator. She is a known for her scientific illustrations and has been involved in numerous taxonomic revisions of spiders.

== Biography ==
Nadine Dupérré was born and raised in Montreal, Quebec. She completed her undergraduate studies in biology at the Université of Montréal in biology. After graduation she worked on beetle biodiversity and ecology in Québec boreal forests with Dr. Pierre Paquin. During this work, they also collected over 25,000 spiders, and in 1999, they took the spider identification class from Fred Coyle and Bill Shear in North Carolina to aid in spider identification. In 2003, Paquin and Dupérré published Guide d’identification des Araignées du Québec, a comprehensive guide to identify all spider species in Quebec.

Dupérré worked as a free-lance arachnologist and illustrator for more than 10 years, completing contracts for government agencies and researchers. She was the principal illustrator for Spiders of North America: An identification manual, published in 2005, as a guide to all spider families and genera in North America. Dupérré was responsible for over 2000 original taxonomic illustrations. In 2008, she began working at the American Museum of Natural History, where she was served as an assistant to Norman I. Platnick and participated in the Oonopid Spider Planetary Biodiversity Inventory (PBI) project. Currently, Dupérré is a researcher at the Arachnida and Myriapoda Research Center of the Leibniz Institute for the Analysis of Biodiversity Change (LIB) in Hamburg, Germany.

In 2025, she was featured in The Museum Makers exhibition at LIB.

== Selected taxa described ==
List of selected taxa described
  - Agyneta hedini Paquin & Dupérré, 2009
  - Australoonops haddadi Platnick & Dupérré, 2010
  - Australoonops skaife Platnick & Dupérré, 2010
  - Backobourkia Framenau, Dupérré, Blackledge & Vink, 2010
  - Brignolia ankhu Platnick, Dupérré, Ott & Kranz-Baltensperger, 2011
  - Brignolia assam Platnick, Dupérré, Ott & Kranz-Baltensperger, 2011
  - Brignolia bengal Platnick, Dupérré, Ott & Kranz-Baltensperger, 2011
  - Brignolia cardamom Platnick, Dupérré, Ott & Kranz-Baltensperger, 2011
  - Brignolia chumphae Platnick, Dupérré, Ott & Kranz-Baltensperger, 2011
  - Brignolia cobre Platnick, Dupérré, Ott & Kranz-Baltensperger, 2011
  - Brignolia dasysterna Platnick, Dupérré, Ott & Kranz-Baltensperger, 2011
  - Brignolia diablo Platnick, Dupérré, Ott & Kranz-Baltensperger, 2011
  - Brignolia elongata Platnick, Dupérré, Ott & Kranz-Baltensperger, 2011
  - Brignolia gading Platnick, Dupérré, Ott & Kranz-Baltensperger, 2011
  - Brignolia jog Platnick, Dupérré, Ott & Kranz-Baltensperger, 2011
  - Brignolia kaikatty Platnick, Dupérré, Ott & Kranz-Baltensperger, 2011
  - Brignolia kapit Platnick, Dupérré, Ott & Kranz-Baltensperger, 2011
  - Brignolia karnataka Platnick, Dupérré, Ott & Kranz-Baltensperger, 2011
  - Brignolia kodaik Platnick, Dupérré, Ott & Kranz-Baltensperger, 2011
  - Brignolia kumily Platnick, Dupérré, Ott & Kranz-Baltensperger, 2011
  - Brignolia mapha Platnick, Dupérré, Ott & Kranz-Baltensperger, 2011
  - Brignolia nilgiri Platnick, Dupérré, Ott & Kranz-Baltensperger, 2011
  - Brignolia palawan Platnick, Dupérré, Ott & Kranz-Baltensperger, 2011
  - Brignolia ratnapura Platnick, Dupérré, Ott & Kranz-Baltensperger, 2011
  - Brignolia rothorum Platnick, Dupérré, Ott & Kranz-Baltensperger, 2011
  - Brignolia schwendingeri Platnick, Dupérré, Ott & Kranz-Baltensperger, 2011
  - Brignolia sinharaja Platnick, Dupérré, Ott & Kranz-Baltensperger, 2011
  - Brignolia sukna Platnick, Dupérré, Ott & Kranz-Baltensperger, 2011
  - Brignolia suthep Platnick, Dupérré, Ott & Kranz-Baltensperger, 2011
  - Brignolia valparai Platnick, Dupérré, Ott & Kranz-Baltensperger, 2011
  - Ceratinella playa Cokendolpher, Torrence, Smith & Dupérré, 2007
  - Costarina Platnick & Dupérré, 2011
  - Cubanops Sánchez-Ruiz, Platnick & Dupérré, 2010
  - Cubanops alayoni Sánchez-Ruiz, Platnick & Dupérré, 2010
  - Cubanops andersoni Sánchez-Ruiz, Platnick & Dupérré, 2010
  - Cubanops armasi Sánchez-Ruiz, Platnick & Dupérré, 2010
  - Cubanops bimini Sánchez-Ruiz, Platnick & Dupérré, 2010
  - Cubanops granpiedra Sánchez-Ruiz, Platnick & Dupérré, 2010
  - Cubanops juragua Sánchez-Ruiz, Platnick & Dupérré, 2010
  - Cubanops terueli Sánchez-Ruiz, Platnick & Dupérré, 2010
  - Cubanops tortuguilla Sánchez-Ruiz, Platnick & Dupérré, 2010
  - Cubanops vega Sánchez-Ruiz, Platnick & Dupérré, 2010
  - Escaphiella Platnick & Dupérré, 2009
  - Escaphiella acapulco Platnick & Dupérré, 2009
  - Escaphiella aratau Platnick & Dupérré, 2009
  - Escaphiella bahia Platnick & Dupérré, 2009
  - Escaphiella betin Platnick & Dupérré, 2009
  - Escaphiella blumenau Platnick & Dupérré, 2009
  - Escaphiella bolivar Platnick & Dupérré, 2009
  - Escaphiella cachimbo Platnick & Dupérré, 2009
  - Escaphiella catemaco Platnick & Dupérré, 2009
  - Escaphiella chiapa Platnick & Dupérré, 2009
  - Escaphiella cidades Platnick & Dupérré, 2009
  - Escaphiella colima Platnick & Dupérré, 2009
  - Escaphiella cristobal Platnick & Dupérré, 2009
  - Escaphiella exlineae Platnick & Dupérré, 2009
  - Escaphiella gigantea Platnick & Dupérré, 2009
  - Escaphiella hesperoides Platnick & Dupérré, 2009
  - Escaphiella isabela Platnick & Dupérré, 2009
  - Escaphiella maculosa Platnick & Dupérré, 2009
  - Escaphiella magna Platnick & Dupérré, 2009
  - Escaphiella morro Platnick & Dupérré, 2009
  - Escaphiella nayarit Platnick & Dupérré, 2009
  - Escaphiella nye Platnick & Dupérré, 2009
  - Escaphiella ocoa Platnick & Dupérré, 2009
  - Escaphiella olivacea Platnick & Dupérré, 2009
  - Escaphiella peckorum Platnick & Dupérré, 2009
  - Escaphiella pocone Platnick & Dupérré, 2009
  - Escaphiella ramirezi Platnick & Dupérré, 2009
  - Escaphiella tayrona Platnick & Dupérré, 2009
  - Escaphiella tonila Platnick & Dupérré, 2009
  - Escaphiella viquezi Platnick & Dupérré, 2009
  - Frederickus Paquin, Dupérré, Buckle & Crawford, 2008
  - Heteroonops andros Platnick & Dupérré, 2009
  - Heteroonops castelloides Platnick & Dupérré, 2009
  - Heteroonops croix Platnick & Dupérré, 2009
  - Heteroonops iviei Platnick & Dupérré, 2009
  - Heteroonops macaque Platnick & Dupérré, 2009
  - Heteroonops murphyorum Platnick & Dupérré, 2009
  - Heteroonops saba Platnick & Dupérré, 2009
  - Heteroonops spinigata Platnick & Dupérré, 2009
  - Heteroonops toro Platnick & Dupérré, 2009
  - Heteroonops vega Platnick & Dupérré, 2009
  - Longoonops Platnick & Dupérré, 2010
  - Longoonops bicolor Platnick & Dupérré, 2010
  - Longoonops chickeringi Platnick & Dupérré, 2010
  - Longoonops gorda Platnick & Dupérré, 2010
  - Meioneta sheffordiana (Dupérré & Paquin, 2007)
  - Mysmena quebecana Lopardo & Dupérré, 2008
  - Niarchos Platnick & Dupérré, 2010
  - Niarchos baehrae Platnick & Dupérré, 2010
  - Niarchos barragani Platnick & Dupérré, 2010
  - Niarchos bonaldoi Platnick & Dupérré, 2010
  - Niarchos cotopaxi Platnick & Dupérré, 2010
  - Niarchos elicioi Platnick & Dupérré, 2010
  - Niarchos facundoi Platnick & Dupérré, 2010
  - Niarchos florezi Platnick & Dupérré, 2010
  - Niarchos foreroi Platnick & Dupérré, 2010
  - Niarchos grismadoi Platnick & Dupérré, 2010
  - Niarchos keili Platnick & Dupérré, 2010
  - Niarchos ligiae Platnick & Dupérré, 2010
  - Niarchos loja Platnick & Dupérré, 2010
  - Niarchos matiasi Platnick & Dupérré, 2010
  - Niarchos michaliki Platnick & Dupérré, 2010
  - Niarchos palenque Platnick & Dupérré, 2010
  - Niarchos ramirezi Platnick & Dupérré, 2010
  - Niarchos rheimsae Platnick & Dupérré, 2010
  - Niarchos santosi Platnick & Dupérré, 2010
  - Niarchos scutatus Platnick & Dupérré, 2010
  - Niarchos tapiai Platnick & Dupérré, 2010
  - Niarchos vegai Platnick & Dupérré, 2010
  - Niarchos wygodzinskyi Platnick & Dupérré, 2010
  - Scaphidysderina Platnick & Dupérré, 2011
  - Scaphidysderina andersoni Platnick & Dupérré, 2011
  - Scaphidysderina baerti Platnick & Dupérré, 2011
  - Scaphidysderina cajamarca Platnick & Dupérré, 2011
  - Scaphidysderina cotopaxi Platnick & Dupérré, 2011
  - Scaphidysderina hormigai Platnick & Dupérré, 2011
  - Scaphidysderina iguaque Platnick & Dupérré, 2011
  - Scaphidysderina loja Platnick & Dupérré, 2011
  - Scaphidysderina manu Platnick & Dupérré, 2011
  - Scaphidysderina molleturo Platnick & Dupérré, 2011
  - Scaphidysderina napo Platnick & Dupérré, 2011
  - Scaphidysderina pagoreni Platnick & Dupérré, 2011
  - Scaphidysderina palenque Platnick & Dupérré, 2011
  - Scaphidysderina pinocchio Platnick & Dupérré, 2011
  - Scaphidysderina scutata Platnick & Dupérré, 2011
  - Scaphidysderina tandapi Platnick & Dupérré, 2011
  - Scaphidysderina tapiai Platnick & Dupérré, 2011
  - Scaphidysderina tayos Platnick & Dupérré, 2011
  - Scaphiella almirante Platnick & Dupérré, 2010
  - Scaphiella altamira Platnick & Dupérré, 2010
  - Scaphiella antonio Platnick & Dupérré, 2010
  - Scaphiella arima Platnick & Dupérré, 2010
  - Scaphiella ayacucho Platnick & Dupérré, 2010
  - Scaphiella bocas Platnick & Dupérré, 2010
  - Scaphiella bonda Platnick & Dupérré, 2010
  - Scaphiella bopal Platnick & Dupérré, 2010
  - Scaphiella buck Platnick & Dupérré, 2010
  - Scaphiella campeche Platnick & Dupérré, 2010
  - Scaphiella capim Platnick & Dupérré, 2010
  - Scaphiella cata Platnick & Dupérré, 2010
  - Scaphiella cayo Platnick & Dupérré, 2010
  - Scaphiella ceiba Platnick & Dupérré, 2010
  - Scaphiella chone Platnick & Dupérré, 2010
  - Scaphiella cocona Platnick & Dupérré, 2010
  - Scaphiella etang Platnick & Dupérré, 2010
  - Scaphiella gracia Platnick & Dupérré, 2010
  - Scaphiella guatopo Platnick & Dupérré, 2010
  - Scaphiella guiria Platnick & Dupérré, 2010
  - Scaphiella hitoy Platnick & Dupérré, 2010
  - Scaphiella hone Platnick & Dupérré, 2010
  - Scaphiella icabaru Platnick & Dupérré, 2010
  - Scaphiella incha Platnick & Dupérré, 2010
  - Scaphiella irmaos Platnick & Dupérré, 2010
  - Scaphiella kartabo Platnick & Dupérré, 2010
  - Scaphiella lancetilla Platnick & Dupérré, 2010
  - Scaphiella longkey Platnick & Dupérré, 2010
  - Scaphiella manaus Platnick & Dupérré, 2010
  - Scaphiella meta Platnick & Dupérré, 2010
  - Scaphiella mico Platnick & Dupérré, 2010
  - Scaphiella miranda Platnick & Dupérré, 2010
  - Scaphiella muralla Platnick & Dupérré, 2010
  - Scaphiella murici Platnick & Dupérré, 2010
  - Scaphiella napo Platnick & Dupérré, 2010
  - Scaphiella osa Platnick & Dupérré, 2010
  - Scaphiella pago Platnick & Dupérré, 2010
  - Scaphiella palenque Platnick & Dupérré, 2010
  - Scaphiella palmillas Platnick & Dupérré, 2010
  - Scaphiella penna Platnick & Dupérré, 2010
  - Scaphiella pich Platnick & Dupérré, 2010
  - Scaphiella saba Platnick & Dupérré, 2010
  - Scaphiella tena Platnick & Dupérré, 2010
  - Scaphiella tigre Platnick & Dupérré, 2010
  - Scaphiella tuxtla Platnick & Dupérré, 2010
  - Scaphiella valencia Platnick & Dupérré, 2010
  - Scaphiella vicencio Platnick & Dupérré, 2010
  - Scaphiella virgen Platnick & Dupérré, 2010
  - Scaphiella vito Platnick & Dupérré, 2010
  - Scaphios Platnick & Dupérré, 2010
  - Scaphios cayambe Platnick & Dupérré, 2010
  - Scaphios jatun Platnick & Dupérré, 2010
  - Scaphios napo Platnick & Dupérré, 2010
  - Scaphios orellana Platnick & Dupérré, 2010
  - Scaphios planada Platnick & Dupérré, 2010
  - Scaphios puyo Platnick & Dupérré, 2010
  - Scaphios wagra Platnick & Dupérré, 2010
  - Scaphios yanayacu Platnick & Dupérré, 2010
  - Tapinotorquis Dupérré & Paquin, 2007
  - Tapinotorquis yamaskensis Dupérré & Paquin, 2007

== Selected works ==
Dupérré, N., & Tapia, E. (2023). Discovery of a new eye pattern in Araneoid spiders, with the description of two new species of Testudinaria from the Ecuadorian Amazon (Araneae: Araneidae). Annales de la Société Entomologique de France |series=Nouvelle Série, 59(5), 337–362. https://doi.org/10.1080/00379271.2023.2244455

Dupérré, N. (2022). Araneae (spiders) of South America: a synopsis of current knowledge. New Zealand Journal of Zoology, 50(1), 3–117. https://doi.org/10.1080/03014223.2021.2022722

Dupérré, N. & Tapia, E. (2015) Descriptions of four kleptoparasitic spiders of the genus Mysmenopsis (Araneae, Mysmenidae) and their potential host spider species in the genus Linothele (Araneae, Dipluridae) from Ecuador. Zootaxa, 3972 (3), 343–368. https://doi.org/10.11646/zootaxa.3972.3.3

Dupérré, N. (2015) Descriptions of twelve new species of ochyroceratids (Araneae, Ochyroceratidae) from mainland Ecuador. Zootaxa, 3956 (4), 451–475. https://doi.org/10.11646/zootaxa.3956.4.1

Dupérré, N. (2013) Taxonomic revision of the spider genera Agyneta and Tennesseellum (Araneae, Linyphiidae) of North America north of Mexico with a study of the embolic division within Micronetinae sensu Saaristo & Tanasevitch 1996. Zootaxa, 3674 (1), 1–189. https://doi.org/10.11646/zootaxa.3674.1.1

=== As illustrator ===
Paquin, Pierre, 1965– & Vink, C. J. (Cornelis Jacob) & Dupérré, N. (Nadine). (2010). Spiders of New Zealand : annotated family key & species list / Pierre Paquin, Cor J. Vink and Nadine Dupérré ; illustrations by Nadine Dupérré. Lincoln, N.Z. : Manaaki Whenua Press

Dondale, C. D. (2006). Two new species of wolf spiders in the Pardosa modica group (Araneae, Lycosidae) from North America. Journal of Arachnology, 34(3), 506–511.

Ubick, D., Paquin, P., Cushing, P. E., & Roth, V. (Eds.). (2005). Spiders of North America: An identification manual. American Arachnological Society. 377 pp.

Hedin, M., & Dellinger, B. (2005). Description of a new species and previously unknown males of Nesticus(Araneae: Nesticidae) from caves in Eastern North America, with comments on species rarity. Journal of Arachnology, 33(1), 1–10.

Bond, J. E. (2004). The Californian euctenizine spider genus Apomastus: The relationship between molecular and morphological taxonomy (Araneae: Mygalomorphae: Cyrtaucheniidae). Invertebrate Systematics, 18, 361–376.
