= Brignolia nigripalpis =

Scientific classification
- Kingdom: Animalia
- Phylum: Arthropoda
- Subphylum: Chelicerata
- Class: Arachnida
- Order: Araneae
- Infraorder: Araneomorphae
- Family: Oonopidae
- Genus: Brignolia
- Species: B. nigripalpis

Binomial name
- Brignolia nigripalpis (Simon, 1893)

Synonyms
- Gamasomorpha nigripalpis Simon, 1893

Species of spider

Brignolia nigripalpis is a species of spiders of the genus Brignolia. It is native to India and Sri Lanka.
