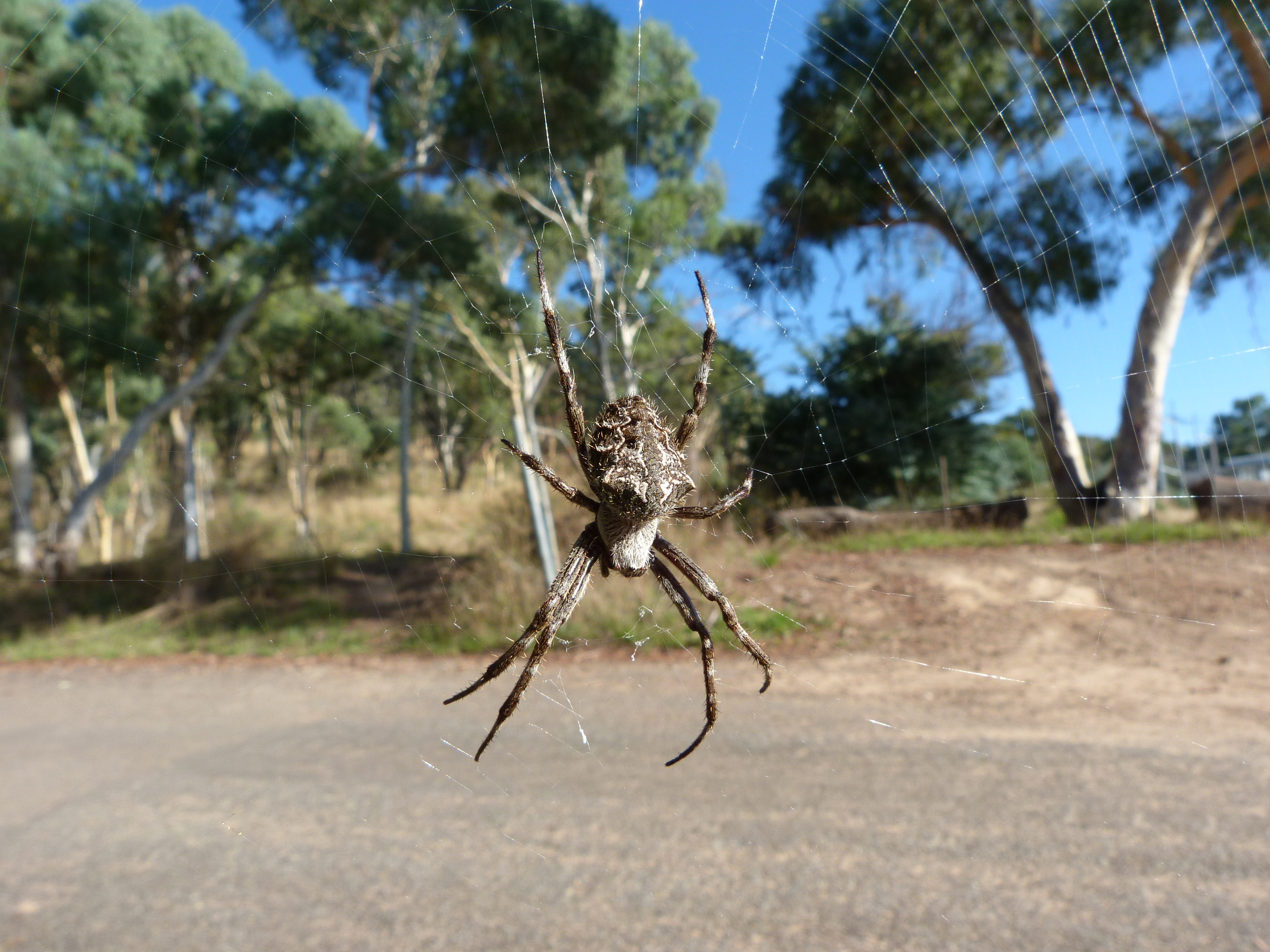

Scientific classification
- Kingdom: Animalia
- Phylum: Arthropoda
- Subphylum: Chelicerata
- Class: Arachnida
- Order: Araneae
- Infraorder: Araneomorphae
- Family: Araneidae
- Genus: Backobourkia; Framenau, Dupérré, Blackledge & Vink, 2010

Type species
- B. heroine (L. Koch, 1871)

Species
- B. brouni (Urquhart, 1885) – Australia, New Zealand; B. collina (Keyserling, 1886) – Australia; B. heroine (L. Koch, 1871) – Australia (mainland, Norfolk Is.), New Caledonia, possibly New Zealand; B. thyridota (Thorell, 1870) – Australia

= Backobourkia =

Genus of spiders

Backobourkia is a genus of South Pacific orb-weaver spiders first described by Volker Framenau, Nadine Dupérré, Todd Blackledge & Cor Vink in 2010. It is a common Australian spider, closely related to Eriophora and placed in the "coxal hook clade" of the Araneinae subfamily of Araneidae. Females are generally the same size among all species, but males are much smaller, suggesting male dwarfism throughout the genus. The genus name is a play on the well-known Australian idiom, "Back of Bourke", meaning very remote and beyond the limits of civilization.

== Species ==
As of November 2026 it contains only four species: B. brouni, B. collina, B. heroine, and B. thyridota B. heroine is more common in western Australia, while B. brouni is more common in eastern Australia. B. heroine is found on New Caledonia and possibly also in New Zealand.
