= Escaphiella hespera =

Scientific classification
- Kingdom: Animalia
- Phylum: Arthropoda
- Subphylum: Chelicerata
- Class: Arachnida
- Order: Araneae
- Infraorder: Araneomorphae
- Family: Oonopidae
- Genus: Escaphiella
- Species: E. hespera

Binomial name
- Escaphiella hespera (Chamberlin, 1924)

Species of spider

Escaphiella hespera is a species of goblin spider in the family Oonopidae. It is found in the United States and Mexico.
