= Brignolia ambigua =

Scientific classification
- Kingdom: Animalia
- Phylum: Arthropoda
- Subphylum: Chelicerata
- Class: Arachnida
- Order: Araneae
- Infraorder: Araneomorphae
- Family: Oonopidae
- Genus: Brignolia
- Species: B. ambigua

Binomial name
- Brignolia ambigua (Simon, 1893)

Synonyms
- Opopaea ambigua Simon, 1893

Species of spider

Brignolia ambigua, is a species of spider of the genus Brignolia. It is endemic to Sri Lanka.
