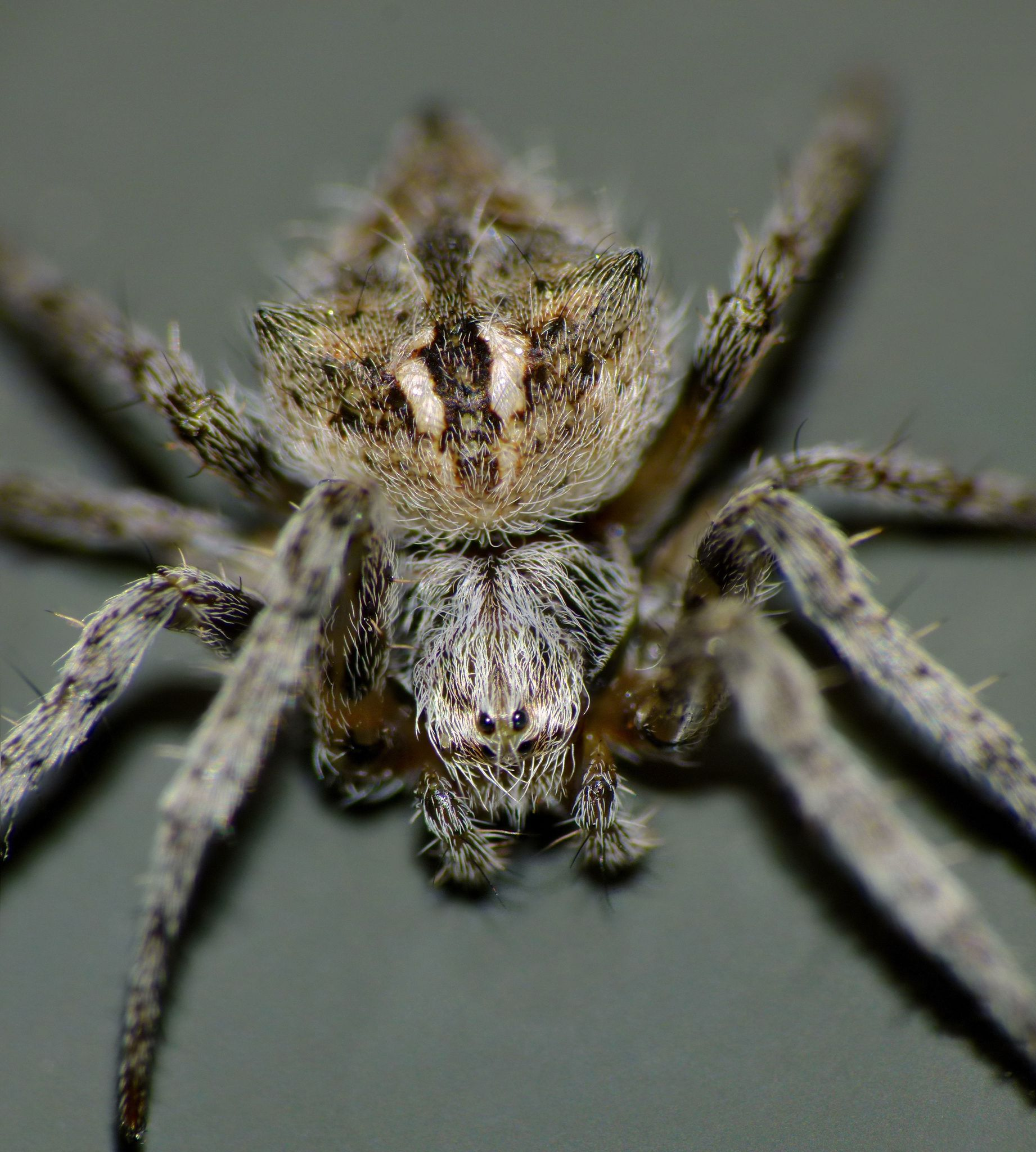

Conservation status
- Not Threatened (NZ TCS)

Scientific classification
- Domain: Eukaryota
- Kingdom: Animalia
- Phylum: Arthropoda
- Subphylum: Chelicerata
- Class: Arachnida
- Order: Araneae
- Infraorder: Araneomorphae
- Family: Araneidae
- Genus: Backobourkia
- Species: B. brouni

Binomial name
- Backobourkia brouni (Urquhart, 1885)

Synonyms
- Backobourkia brounii (Urquhart, 1885); Epeira brounii; Epeira brounii indistincta; Araneus brouni; Araneus heroine; Eriophora heroine

= Backobourkia brouni =

Species of Arachnida

Backobourkia brouni,, or Broun's marbled orb-weaver, also often referred to by its synonym Backobourkia brounii, is a spider native to Australia and New Zealand.

== Taxonomy ==
This species was described as Epeira brounii in 1885 by Arthur Urquhart from male and female specimens collected in the northern section of the North Island. It was most recently revised in 2010.

== Description ==
The male is recorded at 8.77mm whereas the female is 12.95mm.

== Distribution ==
This species is native to New Zealand and Australia.

== Conservation status ==
Under the New Zealand Threat Classification System, this species is listed as "Not Threatened" with the qualifier of "Secure Overseas".
