= Brignolia trichinalis =

Scientific classification
- Kingdom: Animalia
- Phylum: Arthropoda
- Subphylum: Chelicerata
- Class: Arachnida
- Order: Araneae
- Infraorder: Araneomorphae
- Family: Oonopidae
- Genus: Brignolia
- Species: B. trichinalis

Binomial name
- Brignolia trichinalis (Benoit, 1979)

Species of spider

Brignolia trichinalis, is a species of spider of the genus Brignolia. It is found on Mauritius, Seychelles, and possibly Sri Lanka.
