= Brignolia =

Scientific classification
- Kingdom: Animalia
- Phylum: Arthropoda
- Subphylum: Chelicerata
- Class: Arachnida
- Order: Araneae
- Infraorder: Araneomorphae
- Family: Oonopidae
- Genus: Brignolia; Dumitrescu & Georgescu, 1983

Type species
- Brignolia parumpunctata (Simon, 1893)

Species
- See text

Diversity
- 31 species

Genus of spiders

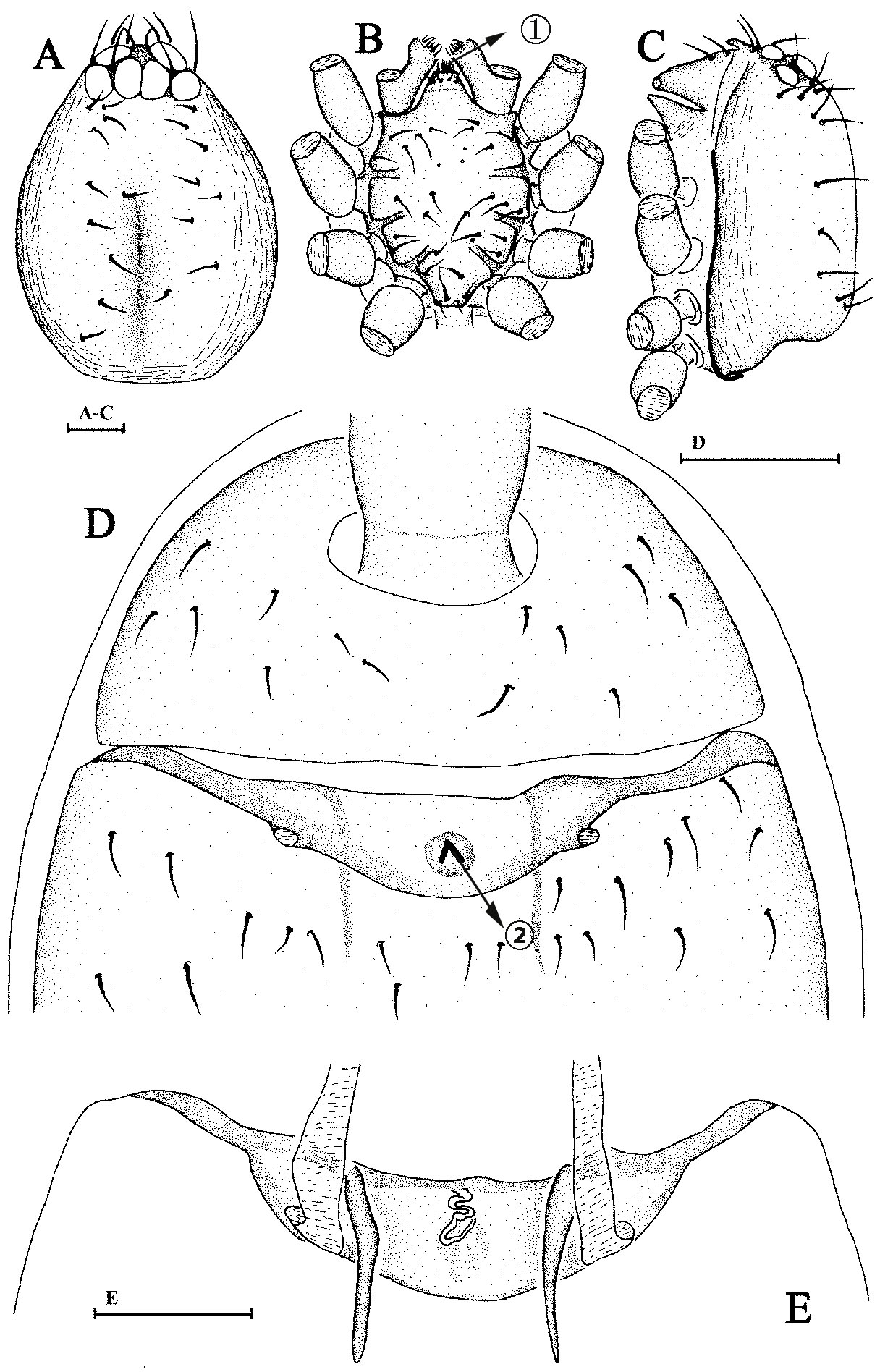
Brignolia parumpunctata (Simon, 1893). A. Carapace of male, dorsal view; B. Same, ventral view; C. Same, lateral view, arrow ① points at membranous tips; D. Ventral scutum of female, ventral view, arrow ② points at V-shaped ridge; E. Genital area of female, dorsal view. Scale bars: 0.1 mm.

Brignolia is a genus of goblin spiders in the family Oonopidae, containing 31 accepted species.

== Species ==
- Brignolia ambigua (Simon, 1893) — Sri Lanka
- Brignolia ankhu Platnick et al., 2011 — Nepal
- Brignolia assam Platnick et al., 2011 — India, Nepal
- Brignolia bengal Platnick et al., 2011 — India
- Brignolia bowleri (Saaristo, 2002) — Seychelles
- Brignolia cardamom Platnick et al., 2011 — India
- Brignolia chumphae Platnick et al., 2011 — Thailand
- Brignolia cobre Platnick et al., 2011 — USA, West Indies
- Brignolia dasysterna Platnick et al., 2011 — USA
- Brignolia diablo Platnick et al., 2011 — Thailand
- Brignolia elongata Platnick et al., 2011 — Borneo
- Brignolia gading Platnick et al., 2011 — Borneo
- Brignolia jog Platnick et al., 2011 — India
- Brignolia kaikatty Platnick et al., 2011 — India
- Brignolia kapit Platnick et al., 2011 — Borneo
- Brignolia karnataka Platnick et al., 2011 — India
- Brignolia kodaik Platnick et al., 2011 — India
- Brignolia kumily Platnick et al., 2011 — India
- Brignolia mapha Platnick et al., 2011 — Thailand
- Brignolia nigripalpis (Simon, 1893) — India, Sri Lanka
- Brignolia nilgiri Platnick et al., 2011 — India
- Brignolia palawan Platnick et al., 2011 — Philippines
- Brignolia parumpunctata (Simon, 1893) — Pantropical
- Brignolia ratnapura Platnick et al., 2011 — Sri Lanka
- Brignolia rothorum Platnick et al., 2011 — India
- Brignolia schwendingeri Platnick et al., 2011 — Vietnam
- Brignolia sinharaja Platnick et al., 2011 — Sri Lanka
- Brignolia sukna Platnick et al., 2011 — Nepal
- Brignolia suthep Platnick et al., 2011 — Thailand
- Brignolia trichinalis (Benoit, 1979) — Mauritius, Seychelles, possibly Sri Lanka
- Brignolia valparai Platnick et al., 2011 — India
