= Frederickus coylei =

Scientific classification
- Domain: Eukaryota
- Kingdom: Animalia
- Phylum: Arthropoda
- Subphylum: Chelicerata
- Class: Arachnida
- Order: Araneae
- Infraorder: Araneomorphae
- Family: Linyphiidae
- Genus: Frederickus
- Species: F. coylei

Binomial name
- Frederickus coylei Paquin et al., 2008

Species of spider

Frederickus coylei is a species of dwarf spider in the family Linyphiidae. It is found in the United States and Canada.
