= Escaphiella =

Scientific classification
- Domain: Eukaryota
- Kingdom: Animalia
- Phylum: Arthropoda
- Subphylum: Chelicerata
- Class: Arachnida
- Order: Araneae
- Infraorder: Araneomorphae
- Family: Oonopidae
- Genus: Escaphiella; Dupérré

Type species
- Escaphiella hespera

Species
- 36, see text

Genus of spiders

Escaphiella is a genus of spiders in the family Oonopidae. It was first described in 2009 by Platnick & Dupérré. As of 2017, it contains 36 species found in the Americas.

== Species ==
Escaphiella comprises the following species:

- Escaphiella acapulco Platnick & Dupérré, 2009
- Escaphiella aratau Platnick & Dupérré, 2009
- Escaphiella argentina (Birabén, 1954)
- Escaphiella bahia Platnick & Dupérré, 2009
- Escaphiella betin Platnick & Dupérré, 2009
- Escaphiella blumenau Platnick & Dupérré, 2009
- Escaphiella bolivar Platnick & Dupérré, 2009
- Escaphiella cachimbo Platnick & Dupérré, 2009
- Escaphiella catemaco Platnick & Dupérré, 2009
- Escaphiella chiapa Platnick & Dupérré, 2009
- Escaphiella cidades Platnick & Dupérré, 2009
- Escaphiella colima Platnick & Dupérré, 2009
- Escaphiella cristobal Platnick & Dupérré, 2009
- Escaphiella exlineae Platnick & Dupérré, 2009
- Escaphiella gertschi (Chickering, 1951)
- Escaphiella gigantea Platnick & Dupérré, 2009
- Escaphiella hespera (Chamberlin, 1924)
- Escaphiella hesperoides Platnick & Dupérré, 2009
- Escaphiella iguala (Gertsch & Davis, 1942)
- Escaphiella isabela Platnick & Dupérré, 2009
- Escaphiella itys (Simon, 1893)
- Escaphiella litoris (Chamberlin, 1924)
- Escaphiella maculosa Platnick & Dupérré, 2009
- Escaphiella magna Platnick & Dupérré, 2009
- Escaphiella morro Platnick & Dupérré, 2009
- Escaphiella nayarit Platnick & Dupérré, 2009
- Escaphiella nye Platnick & Dupérré, 2009
- Escaphiella ocoa Platnick & Dupérré, 2009
- Escaphiella olivacea Platnick & Dupérré, 2009
- Escaphiella peckorum Platnick & Dupérré, 2009
- Escaphiella pocone Platnick & Dupérré, 2009
- Escaphiella ramirezi Platnick & Dupérré, 2009
- Escaphiella schmidti (Reimoser, 1939)
- Escaphiella tayrona Platnick & Dupérré, 2009
- Escaphiella tonila Platnick & Dupérré, 2009
- Escaphiella viquezi Platnick & Dupérré, 2009
