= Brignolia ratnapura =

Scientific classification
- Kingdom: Animalia
- Phylum: Arthropoda
- Subphylum: Chelicerata
- Class: Arachnida
- Order: Araneae
- Infraorder: Araneomorphae
- Family: Oonopidae
- Genus: Brignolia
- Species: B. ratnapura

Binomial name
- Brignolia ratnapura Platnick et al., 2011

Species of spider

Brignolia ratnapura, is a species of spider of the genus Brignolia. It is endemic to Sri Lanka.
