= Frederickus =

Genus of spiders

{{Automatic taxobox | name = | image = | image_caption = | image2 = | image2_caption = | taxon = Frederickus | authority = Paquin, Dupérré, Buckle & Crawford, 2008 | type_species = F. coylei | type_species_authority = Paquin, Dupérré, Buckle & Crawford, 2008 | subdivision_ranks = Species | subdivision = {{Specieslist

   |F. coylei|Paquin, Dupérré, Buckle & Crawford, 2008 – USA, Canada
   |F. wilburi|([[Herbert Walter Levi|Levi]] & [[Herbert Walter Levi|Levi]], 1955) – USA, Canada
 }}

}}

Frederickus is a genus of North American dwarf spiders that was first described by P. Paquin in 2008. As of May 2019 it contains only two species, both found in Canada and the United States: F. coylei and F. wilburi.
