= Ischnothyreus bipartitus =

Scientific classification
- Kingdom: Animalia
- Phylum: Arthropoda
- Subphylum: Chelicerata
- Class: Arachnida
- Order: Araneae
- Infraorder: Araneomorphae
- Family: Oonopidae
- Genus: Ischnothyreus
- Species: I. bipartitus

Binomial name
- Ischnothyreus bipartitus Simon, 1893

Species of spider

Ischnothyreus bipartitus, is a species of spider of the genus Ischnothyreus. It is endemic to Sri Lanka.
