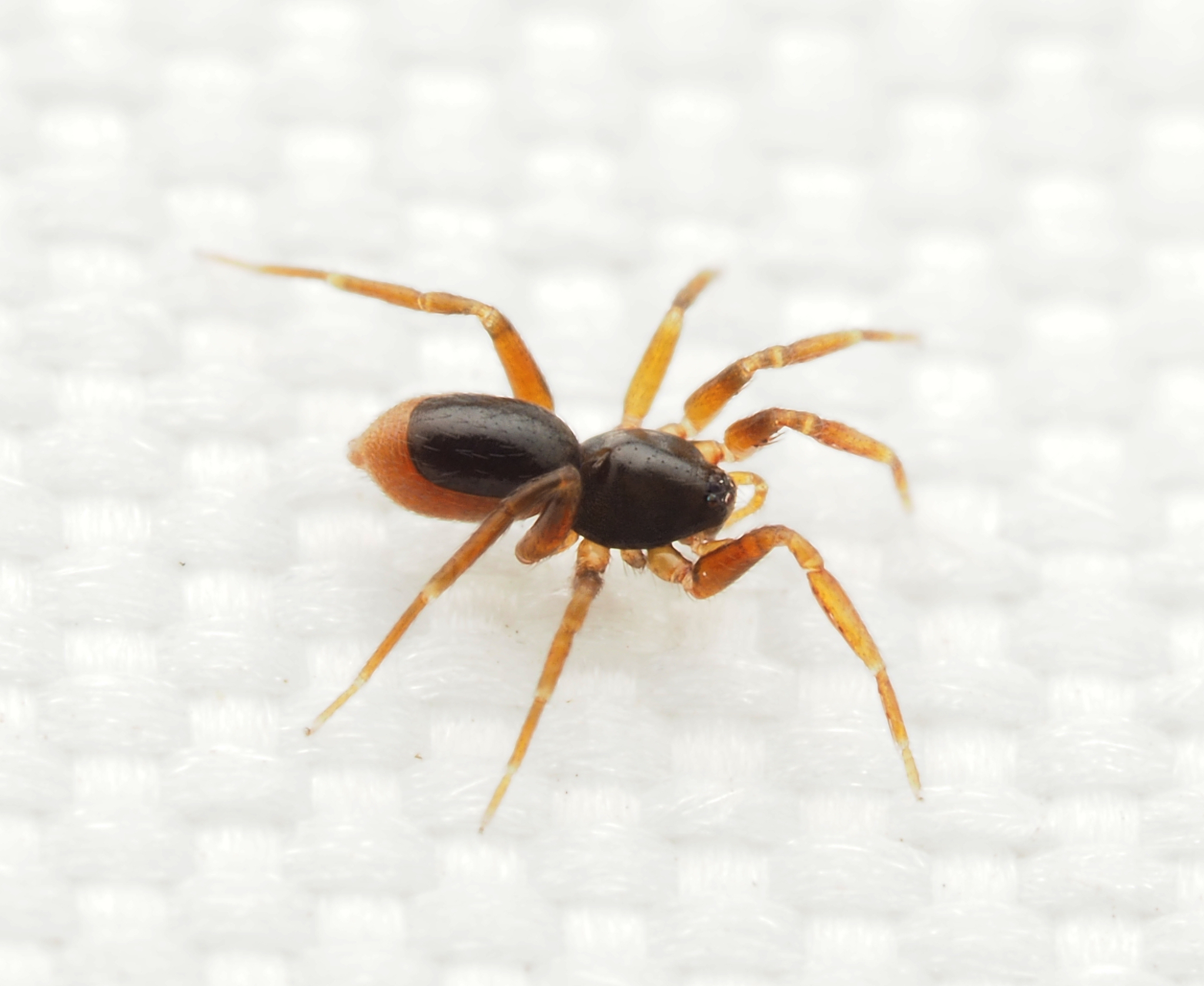
- Ischnothyreus hamatus

Scientific classification
- Kingdom: Animalia
- Phylum: Arthropoda
- Subphylum: Chelicerata
- Class: Arachnida
- Order: Araneae
- Infraorder: Araneomorphae
- Family: Oonopidae
- Genus: Ischnothyreus; Simon, 1893

Type species
- Ischnothyreus peltifer Simon, 1892

Species
- 126 species

Synonyms
- Ischnothyrella Saaristo, 2001; Ischnaspis Simon, 1892

= Ischnothyreus =

Genus of spiders

Ischnothyreus is a genus of oonopid spiders generally between 1.25 (smallest male) and 2.25 mm (largest female) long. They have six eyes; in at least the species I. peltifer and I. omus, the males have a curious knob or hook at the base of the fang.

Eye pattern of I. browni

Hooks on fangs of I. peltifer

== Species ==
As of August 2023 it contains 126 species:

- Ischnothyreus aculeatus (Simon, 1893) — Philippines
- Ischnothyreus an Tong & Li, 2016 — Singapore
- Ischnothyreus arcus Edward & Harvey, 2014 — Queensland
- Ischnothyreus ascifer Richard, 2016 — Sumatra
- Ischnothyreus auritus Tong & Li, 2013 — China
- Ischnothyreus baltenspergerae Richard, 2016 — Java
- Ischnothyreus balu Kranz-Baltensperger, 2011 — Borneo
- Ischnothyreus barratus Edward & Harvey, 2014 — Queensland
- Ischnothyreus barus Kranz-Baltensperger, 2011 — Borneo
- Ischnothyreus bauri Richard, 2016 — Java
- Ischnothyreus bifidus Edward & Harvey, 2014 — Queensland
- Ischnothyreus binorbis Edward & Harvey, 2014 — Queensland
- Ischnothyreus bipartitus Simon, 1893 — Sri Lanka
- Ischnothyreus boonjee Edward & Harvey, 2014 — Queensland
- Ischnothyreus browni Chickering, 1968 — Costa Rica
- Ischnothyreus brunneus Tong & Li, 2016 — Singapore
- Ischnothyreus bualveus Edward & Harvey, 2014 — Queensland
- Ischnothyreus bupariorbis Edward & Harvey, 2014 — Queensland
- Ischnothyreus campanaceus Tong & Li, 2013 — China
- Ischnothyreus caoqii Tong, Bian & Li, 2023 — China
- Ischnothyreus chippy Ranasinghe & Benjamin, 2018 — Sri Lanka
- Ischnothyreus collingwoodi Edward & Harvey, 2014 — Queensland
- Ischnothyreus comicus Edward & Harvey, 2014 — Queensland
- Ischnothyreus concavus Richard, 2016 — Sumatra
- Ischnothyreus corniculatum Edward & Harvey, 2014 — Queensland
- Ischnothyreus cornuatus Edward & Harvey, 2014 — Queensland
- Ischnothyreus corollacous Tong & Li, 2013 — Laos
- Ischnothyreus crenulatus Edward & Harvey, 2014 — Queensland
- Ischnothyreus cristiformis Tong & Li, 2021 — China
- Ischnothyreus culleni Edward & Harvey, 2014 — Queensland
- Ischnothyreus dactylinus Tong & Li, 2016 — Singapore
- Ischnothyreus danum Kranz-Baltensperger, 2011 — Borneo
- Ischnothyreus darwini Edward & Harvey, 2014 — Northern Territory
- Ischnothyreus deccanensis Tikader & Malhotra, 1974 — India
- Ischnothyreus deelemanae Kranz-Baltensperger, 2011 — Borneo
- Ischnothyreus digitus Edward & Harvey, 2014 — Queensland
- Ischnothyreus eacham Edward & Harvey, 2014 — Queensland
- Ischnothyreus elvis Kranz-Baltensperger, 2011 — Borneo
- Ischnothyreus eungella Edward & Harvey, 2014 — Queensland
- Ischnothyreus falcatus Tong & Li, 2013 — China
- Ischnothyreus falcifer Kranz-Baltensperger, 2011 — Borneo
- Ischnothyreus flabellifer Kranz-Baltensperger, 2011 — Borneo
- Ischnothyreus flagellichelis Xu, 1989 — China
- Ischnothyreus flippi Kranz-Baltensperger, 2011 — Borneo
- Ischnothyreus florence Edward & Harvey, 2014 — Northern Territory
- Ischnothyreus florifer Kranz-Baltensperger, 2011 — Borneo
- Ischnothyreus fobor Kranz-Baltensperger, 2011 — Borneo
- Ischnothyreus gigeri Richard, 2016 — Java
- Ischnothyreus habeggeri Richard, 2016 — Sumatra
- Ischnothyreus hamatus Edward & Harvey, 2014 — Queensland
- Ischnothyreus hanae Tong & Li, 2013 — China
- Ischnothyreus haymozi Richard, 2016 — Sumatra
- Ischnothyreus hooki Kranz-Baltensperger, 2011 — Borneo
- Ischnothyreus hoplophorus Edward & Harvey, 2014 — Queensland
- Ischnothyreus hponkanrazi Tong & Li, 2020 — Myanmar
- Ischnothyreus jianglangi Tong & Li, 2020 — Myanmar
- Ischnothyreus jivani Benoit, 1979 — Seychelles
- Ischnothyreus jojo Kranz-Baltensperger, 2011 — Borneo
- Ischnothyreus julianneae Edward & Harvey, 2014 — Queensland
- Ischnothyreus kalimantan Kranz-Baltensperger, 2011 — Borneo
- Ischnothyreus kentigensis Tong & Li, 2014 — Taiwan
- Ischnothyreus ker Edward & Harvey, 2014 — Queensland
- Ischnothyreus khamis Saaristo & van Harten, 2006 — Yemen
- Ischnothyreus lanutoo Marples, 1955 — Samoa
- Ischnothyreus ligulatus Richard, 2016 — Java
- Ischnothyreus linzhiensis Hu, 2001 — China
- Ischnothyreus lucidus Richard, 2016 — Sumatra
- Ischnothyreus lymphaseus Simon, 1893 — Sri Lanka
- Ischnothyreus mangun Tong & Li, 2021 — China
- Ischnothyreus marggii Richard, 2016 — Sumatra
- Ischnothyreus matang Kranz-Baltensperger, 2011 — Borneo
- Ischnothyreus meidamon Edward & Harvey, 2014 — Queensland
- Ischnothyreus mengyang Tong & Li, 2021 — China
- Ischnothyreus metok Tong, Bian & Li, 2023 — China
- Ischnothyreus meukyawwa Tong & Li, 2020 — Myanmar
- Ischnothyreus microphthalmus Richard, 2016 — Sumatra
- Ischnothyreus montiethi Edward & Harvey, 2014 — Queensland
- Ischnothyreus mulumi Kranz-Baltensperger, 2011 — Borneo
- Ischnothyreus namo Kranz-Baltensperger, 2012 — Malaysia
- Ischnothyreus narutomii (Nakatsudi, 1942) — China, Taiwan, Japan
- Ischnothyreus nentwigorum Richard, 2016 — Java
- Ischnothyreus nourlangie Edward & Harvey, 2014 — Northern Territory
- Ischnothyreus obscurus Richard, 2016 — Sumatra
- Ischnothyreus ogatai Suzuki, Hidaka & Tatsuta, 2023 — Ryukyu Islands
- Ischnothyreus ovinus Edward & Harvey, 2014 — Queensland
- Ischnothyreus pacificus Roewer, 1963 — Micronesia
- Ischnothyreus peltifer (Simon, 1892) — Tropical Asia. Introduced to North, Central, and South America, Great Britain, Switzerland, Gabon, Seychelles, Madagascar, and Hawaii
- Ischnothyreus piricius Edward & Harvey, 2014 — Queensland
- Ischnothyreus poculum Tong & Li, 2016 — Singapore
- Ischnothyreus pome Tong, Bian & Li, 2023 — China
- Ischnothyreus pterodactyl Edward & Harvey, 2014 — Queensland
- Ischnothyreus puruntatamerii Edward & Harvey, 2014 — Northern Territory
- Ischnothyreus putao Tong & Li, 2020 — Myanmar
- Ischnothyreus qianlongae Tong & Li, 2008 — China
- Ischnothyreus qidaoban Tong & Li, 2021 — China
- Ischnothyreus qiuxing Tong & Li, 2020 — Myanmar, China
- Ischnothyreus raveni Edward & Harvey, 2014 — Queensland
- Ischnothyreus rex Kranz-Baltensperger, 2011 — Borneo
- Ischnothyreus rixi Edward & Harvey, 2014 — Queensland
- Ischnothyreus ruyuanensis Tong, 2023 — China
- Ischnothyreus serapi Kranz-Baltensperger, 2011 — Borneo
- Ischnothyreus serpentinum Saaristo, 2001 — Seychelles, Madagascar, Java
- Ischnothyreus shillongensis Tikader, 1968 — India, Bhutan
- Ischnothyreus sigridae Richard, 2016 — Java
- Ischnothyreus sijiae Tong & Li, 2021 — China
- Ischnothyreus spineus Tong & Li, 2012 — China
- Ischnothyreus stauntoni Edward & Harvey, 2014 — Queensland
- Ischnothyreus subaculeatus Roewer, 1938 — Moluccas
- Ischnothyreus tadetu Tong & Li, 2013 — Laos
- Ischnothyreus tadfane Tong & Li, 2013 — Laos
- Ischnothyreus taunggyi Tong & Li, 2020 — Myanmar
- Ischnothyreus tectorius Tong & Li, 2016 — Singapore
- Ischnothyreus tekek Kranz-Baltensperger, 2012 — Malaysia
- Ischnothyreus tergeminus Liu, Xu & Henrard, 2019 — China
- Ischnothyreus tioman Kranz-Baltensperger, 2012 — Malaysia
- Ischnothyreus tragicus Edward & Harvey, 2014 — Queensland
- Ischnothyreus tumidus Edward & Harvey, 2014 — Queensland
- Ischnothyreus ujungkulon Richard, 2016 — Java
- Ischnothyreus velox Jackson, 1908 — Tropical Asia. Introduced to North, Central, South America, Brazil, Great Britain, Netherlands, Germany, Egypt, Seychelles, Madagascar, Hawaii
- Ischnothyreus xiaolongha Tong & Li, 2021 — China
- Ischnothyreus xui Tong & Li, 2013 — China
- Ischnothyreus yuanyeae Tong & Li, 2013 — China
- Ischnothyreus yueluensis Yin & Wang, 1984 — China
- Ischnothyreus yunlong Tong & Li, 2021 — China
- Ischnothyreus zhigangi Tong & Li, 2020 — Myanmar
- Ischnothyreus zhoujiayan Tong & Li, 2018 — China
