= Xestaspis paulina =

Scientific classification
- Kingdom: Animalia
- Phylum: Arthropoda
- Subphylum: Chelicerata
- Class: Arachnida
- Order: Araneae
- Infraorder: Araneomorphae
- Family: Oonopidae
- Genus: Xestaspis
- Species: X. paulina

Binomial name
- Xestaspis paulina Eichenberger, 2012

Species of spider

Xestaspis paulina is a species of spider of the genus Xestaspis. It is endemic to Sri Lanka.
