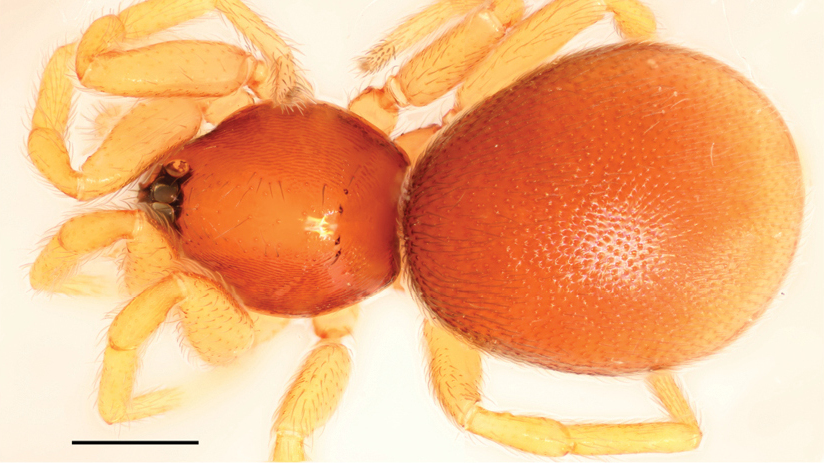
- X. shoushanensis, female

Scientific classification
- Kingdom: Animalia
- Phylum: Arthropoda
- Subphylum: Chelicerata
- Class: Arachnida
- Order: Araneae
- Infraorder: Araneomorphae
- Family: Oonopidae
- Genus: Xestaspis; Simon, 1884

Type species
- X. loricata (L. Koch, 1873)

Species
- 19, see text

= Xestaspis =

Genus of spiders

Xestaspis is a genus of goblin spiders that was first described by Eugène Louis Simon in 1884.

== Species ==
X. shoushanensis

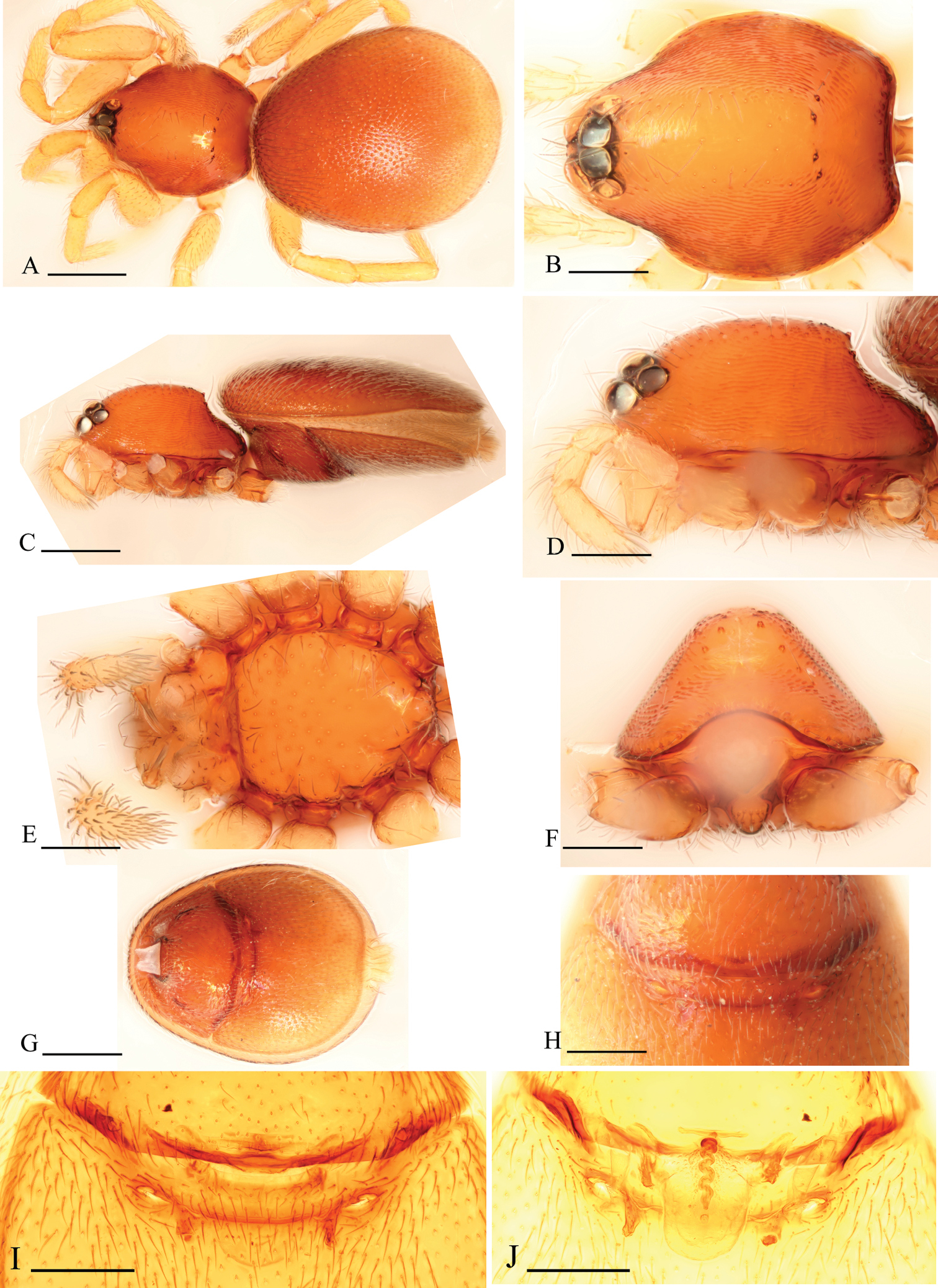
female

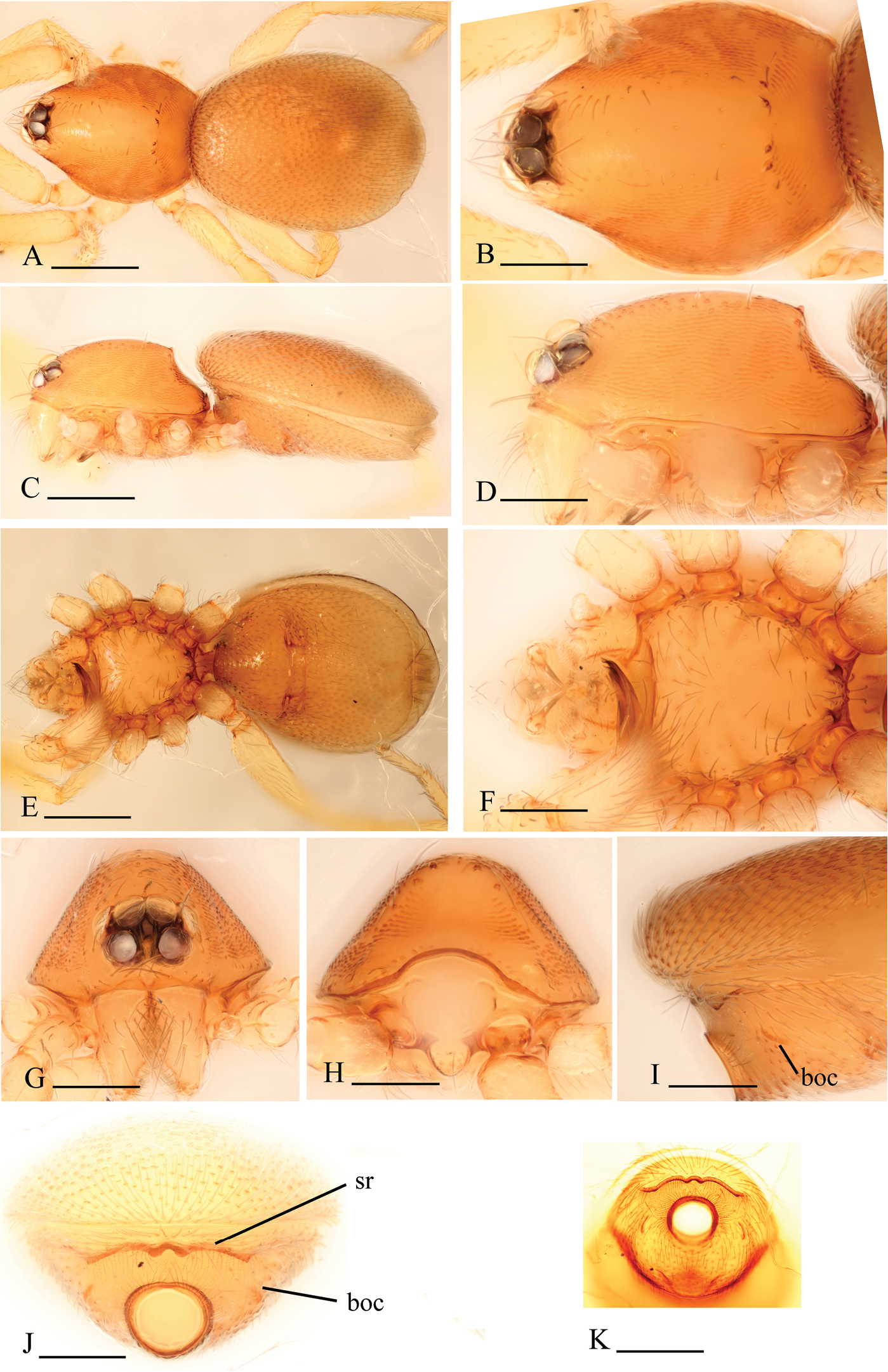
male

As of January 2021 it contains 19 species, found in Asia, Africa, Oceania, Yemen, and Sri Lanka:

- Xestaspis biflocci Eichenberger, 2012 — Thailand
- Xestaspis kandy Eichenberger, 2012 — Sri Lanka
- Xestaspis linnaei Ott & Harvey, 2008 — Australia (Western Australia)
- Xestaspis loricata (L. Koch, 1873) (type) — China, Taiwan, Laos, Australia, Micronesia, French Polynesia
- Xestaspis nitida Simon, 1884 — Algeria, Yemen
- Xestaspis nuwaraeliya Ranasinghe & Benjamin, 2016 — Sri Lanka
- Xestaspis padaviya Ranasinghe & Benjamin, 2016 — Sri Lanka
- Xestaspis parmata (Thorell, 1890) — Myanmar, Indonesia (Sumatra, Java, Lombok). Introduced to USA to Panama, Caribbean, Venezuela, Brazil, Madeira, Equatorial Guinea (Bioko), São Tomé and Príncipe, St. Helena, Mauritius, Seychelles, Yemen
- Xestaspis paulina Eichenberger, 2012 — Sri Lanka
- Xestaspis pophami Ranasinghe & Benjamin, 2016 — Sri Lanka
- Xestaspis recurva Strand, 1906 — Ethiopia
- Xestaspis rostrata Tong & Li, 2009 — China
- Xestaspis semengoh Eichenberger, 2012 — Borneo
- Xestaspis sertata Simon, 1907 — Equatorial Guinea (Bioko)
- Xestaspis shoushanensis Tong & Li, 2014 — Taiwan
- Xestaspis sis Saaristo & van Harten, 2006 — Yemen
- Xestaspis sublaevis Simon, 1893 — Sri Lanka
- Xestaspis tumidula Simon, 1893 — Sierra Leone
- Xestaspis yemeni Saaristo & van Harten, 2006 — Yemen
