= Oonopinus angustatus =

Scientific classification
- Kingdom: Animalia
- Phylum: Arthropoda
- Subphylum: Chelicerata
- Class: Arachnida
- Order: Araneae
- Infraorder: Araneomorphae
- Family: Oonopidae
- Genus: Oonopinus
- Species: O. angustatus

Binomial name
- Oonopinus angustatus (Simon, 1882)

Species of spider

Oonopinus angustatus is a spider species found in Spain, France, Corsica and Algeria.

It is the type species of the genus Oonopinus.
