= Oonopinus ionicus =

Scientific classification
- Kingdom: Animalia
- Phylum: Arthropoda
- Subphylum: Chelicerata
- Class: Arachnida
- Order: Araneae
- Infraorder: Araneomorphae
- Family: Oonopidae
- Genus: Oonopinus
- Species: O. ionicus

Binomial name
- Oonopinus ionicus Brignoli, 1979

Species of spider

Oonopinus ionicus is a spider species found in Greece.
