= Oonopinus =

Scientific classification
- Kingdom: Animalia
- Phylum: Arthropoda
- Subphylum: Chelicerata
- Class: Arachnida
- Order: Araneae
- Infraorder: Araneomorphae
- Family: Oonopidae
- Genus: Oonopinus; Simon, 1893

Species
- See text

Genus of spiders

Oonopinus is a spider genus in the family Oonopidae.

== Species ==
- Oonopinus angustatus (Simon, 1882) — Spain, France, Corsica, Algeria
- Oonopinus argentinus Birabén, 1955 — Argentina
- Oonopinus aurantiacus Simon, 1893 — Venezuela
- Oonopinus bistriatus Simon, 1907 — Sierra Leone
- Oonopinus centralis Gertsch, 1941 — Panama
- Oonopinus corneus Tong & Li, 2008 — China
- Oonopinus ionicus Brignoli, 1979 — Greece
- Oonopinus kilikus Suman, 1965 — Seychelles, Hawaii
- Oonopinus modestus Chickering, 1951 — Panama
- Oonopinus oceanicus Marples, 1955 — Samoa, Niue
- Oonopinus pilulus Suman, 1965 — China, Hawaii
- Oonopinus pretiosus Bryant, 1942 — Virgin Islands
- Oonopinus pruvotae Berland, 1929 — New Caledonia
