= Coxapopha =

Scientific classification
- Kingdom: Animalia
- Phylum: Arthropoda
- Subphylum: Chelicerata
- Class: Arachnida
- Order: Araneae
- Infraorder: Araneomorphae
- Family: Oonopidae
- Genus: Coxapopha; Platnick

Species
- Coxapopha bare Ott & Brescovit, 2004; Coxapopha caeca (Birabén, 1954); Coxapopha carinata Ott & Brescovit, 2004; Coxapopha diblemma Platnick, 2000; Coxapopha yuyapichis Ott & Brescovit, 2004

Genus of spiders

Coxapopha is a genus of spiders in the family Oonopidae. It was first described in 2000 by Platnick. As of 2016, it contains 5 species.
