= Coxapopha carinata =

Scientific classification
- Kingdom: Animalia
- Phylum: Arthropoda
- Subphylum: Chelicerata
- Class: Arachnida
- Order: Araneae
- Infraorder: Araneomorphae
- Family: Oonopidae
- Genus: Coxapopha
- Species: C. carinata

Binomial name
- Coxapopha carinata Ott & Brescovit, 2004

Species of spider

Coxapopha carinata is a species of araneomorphae spider of the family Oonopidae.

== Distribution ==
The species is endemic to the state of Amazonas in Brazil. It is found in Manaus.

== Description ==
The male holotype measures 2.0 mm.

== Publications ==
- Ott & Brescovit, 2004 : "Three new species of the haplogyne spider genus Coxapopha Platnick from the Amazon region (Araneae, Oonopidae)". Revista Ibérica de Aracnología, vol. 9, p. 127-135 ().
