= Leptodrassus =

Scientific classification
- Kingdom: Animalia
- Phylum: Arthropoda
- Subphylum: Chelicerata
- Class: Arachnida
- Order: Araneae
- Infraorder: Araneomorphae
- Family: Gnaphosidae
- Genus: Leptodrassus; Simon, 1878

Type species
- L. femineus (Simon, 1873)

Species
- 11, see text

Genus of spiders

Leptodrassus is a genus of ground spiders that was first described by Eugène Simon in 1878.

== Description ==
The genus Leptodrassus is characterized by small, pale-colored gnaphosids measuring 2-6 mm in body length. Spiders in this genus have markedly enlarged anterior median eyes borne on a common, black patch, with eyes densely grouped around the anterior median eyes. The anterior lateral eyes touch both the anterior median eyes and posterior lateral eyes.

The chelicerae have two promarginal and 0-2 retromarginal teeth. The labium is wider than long, and the fovea is indistinct or absent. Males lack a dorsal scutum on the opisthosoma.

== Species ==
As of September 2025, this genus includes 11 species:

- Leptodrassus albidus Simon, 1914 – Azores, Canary Islands, Spain, Greece, Turkey, Israel
- Leptodrassus bergensis Tucker, 1923 – South Africa
- Leptodrassus croaticus Dalmas, 1919 – Croatia
- Leptodrassus diomedeus Caporiacco, 1951 – Italy
- Leptodrassus femineus (Simon, 1873) – Portugal, Bulgaria, Greece, Cyprus, Israel (type species)
- Leptodrassus fragilis Dalmas, 1919 – Algeria, Libya
- Leptodrassus incertus Banks, 1898 – Mexico
- Leptodrassus licentiosus Dalmas, 1919 – South Africa
- Leptodrassus punicus Dalmas, 1919 – Tunisia
- Leptodrassus strandi Caporiacco, 1947 – Ethiopia
- Leptodrassus tropicus Dalmas, 1919 – Sierra Leone
