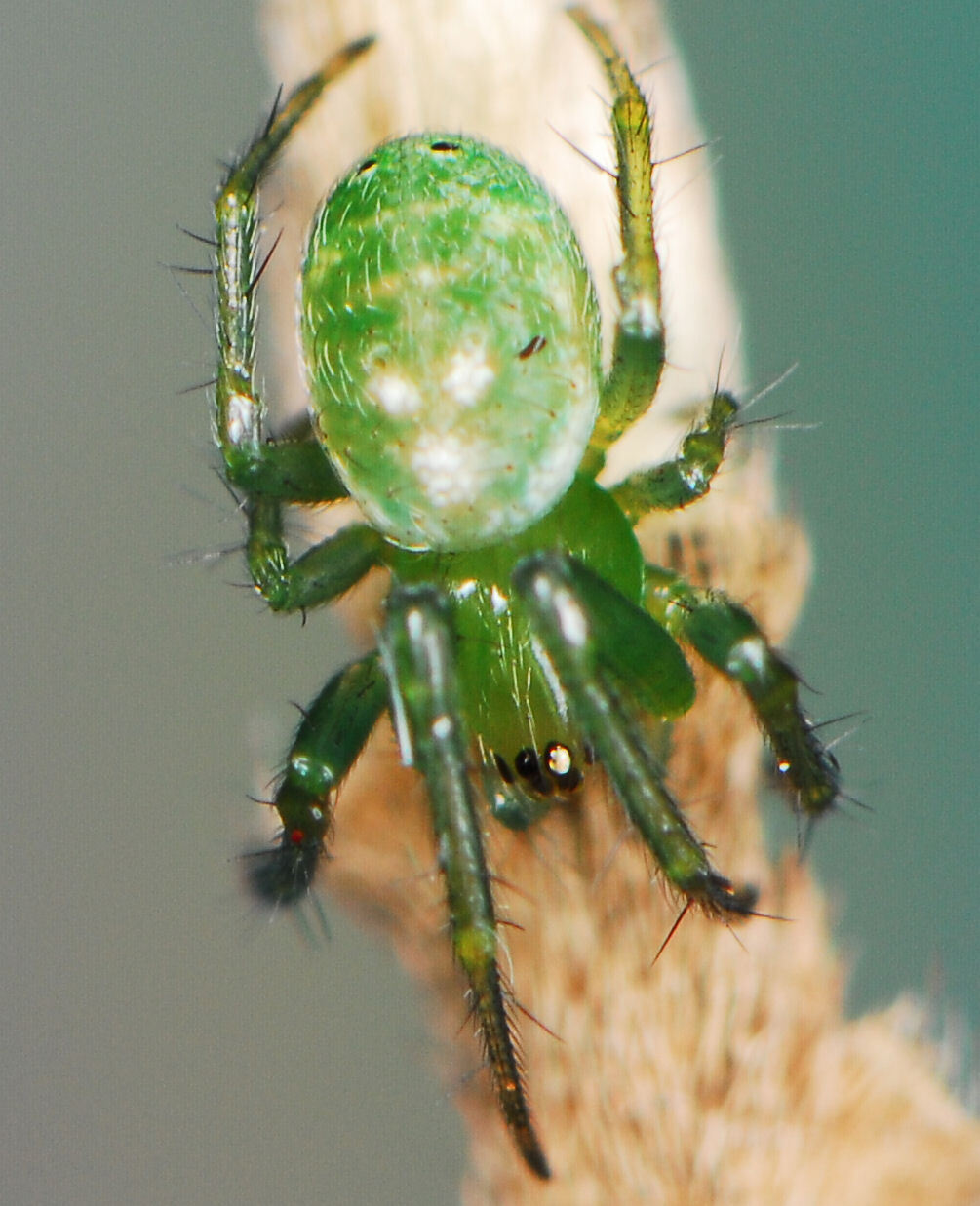
- Female P. seriata

Scientific classification
- Kingdom: Animalia
- Phylum: Arthropoda
- Subphylum: Chelicerata
- Class: Arachnida
- Order: Araneae
- Infraorder: Araneomorphae
- Family: Araneidae
- Genus: Prasonica; Simon, 1895

Type species
- P. albolimbata Simon, 1895

Species
- 8, see text

= Prasonica =

Genus of spiders

Prasonica is a genus of orb-weaver spiders first described by Eugène Simon in 1895.

== Species ==
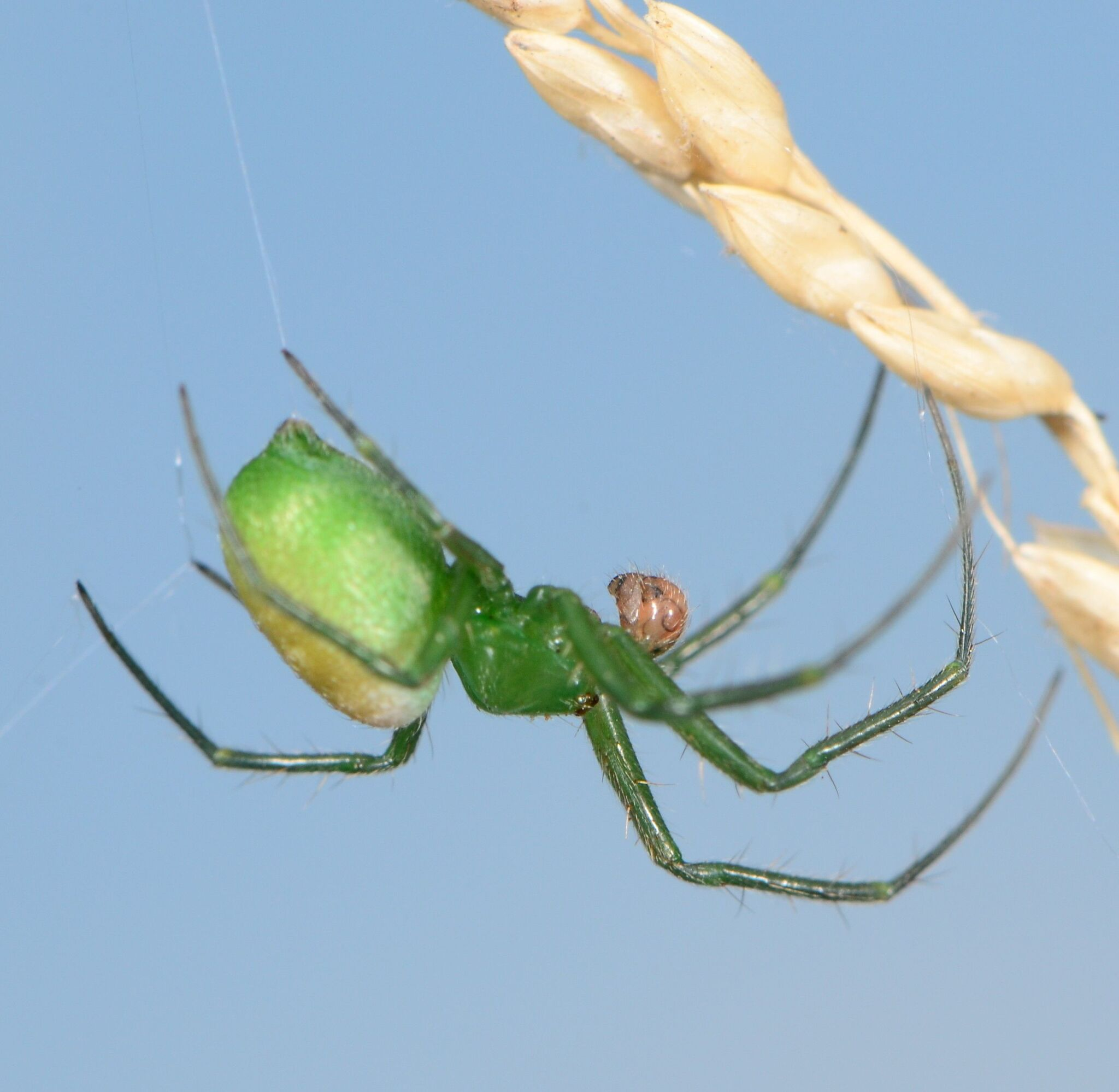
juvenile male P. albolimbata

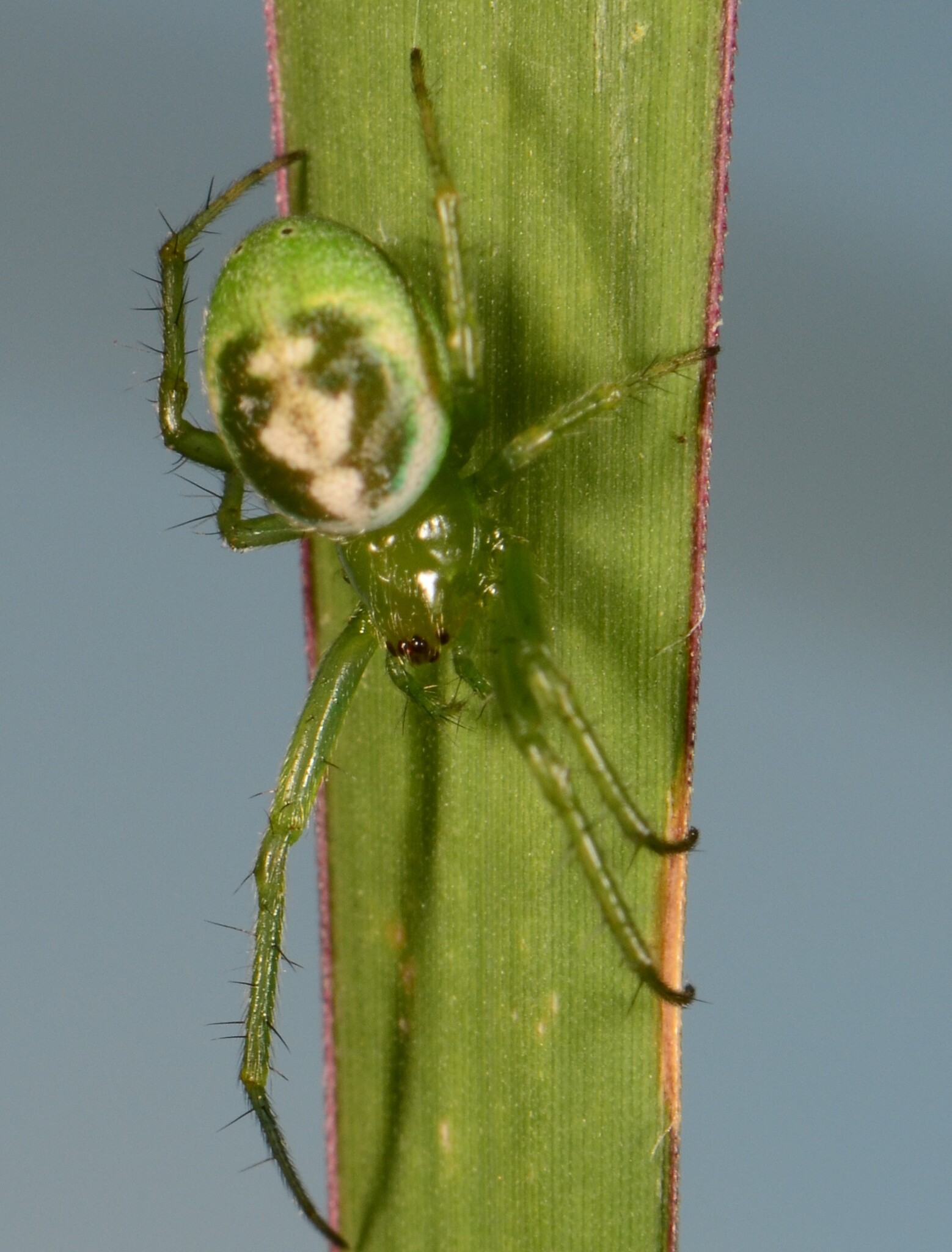
female P. nigrotaeniata

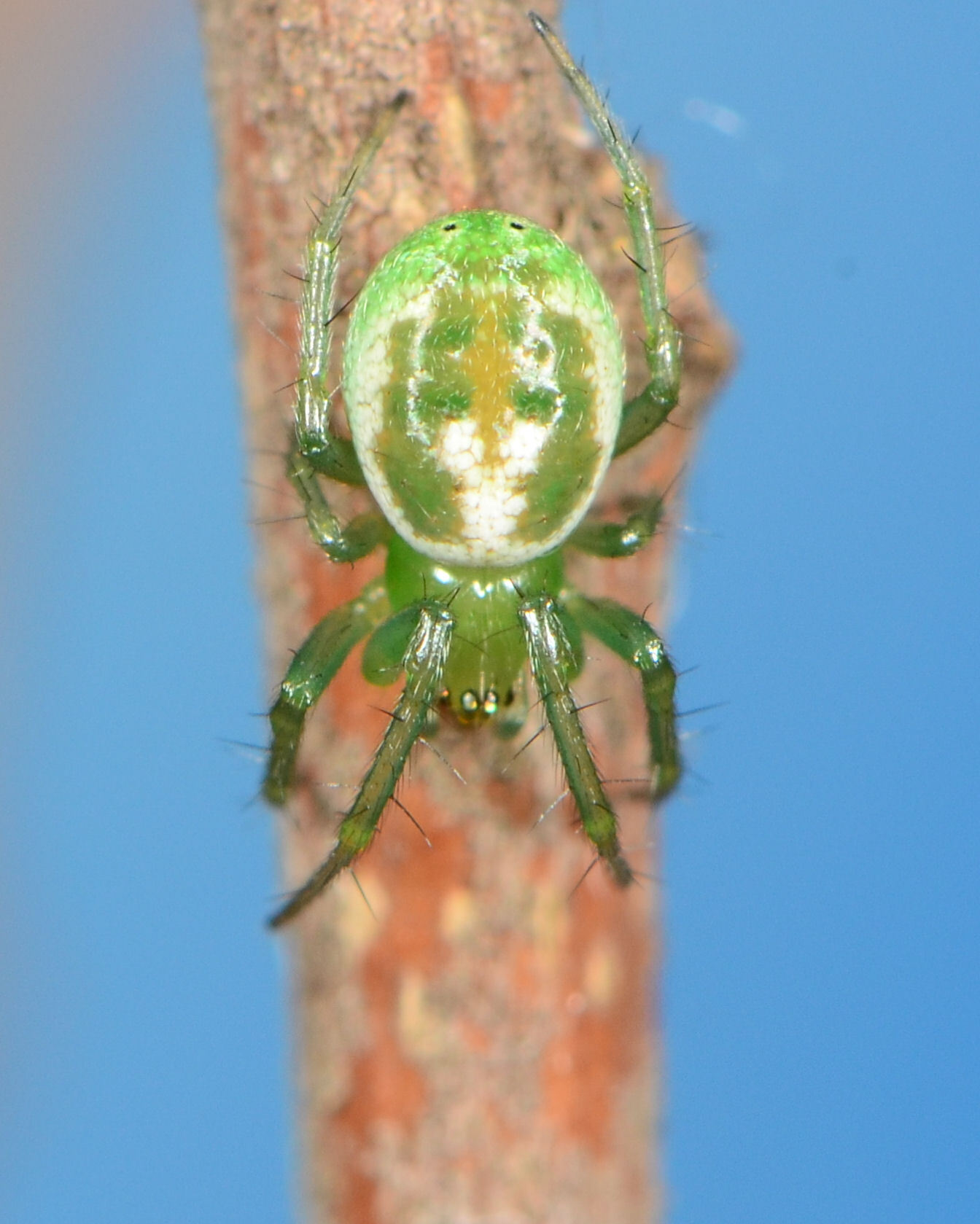
female P. seriata

As of September 2025, this genus includes eight species:

- Prasonica albolimbata Simon, 1895 – DR Congo, South Africa, Madagascar, Yemen (type species)
- Prasonica anarillea Roberts, 1983 – Seychelles (Aldabra)
- Prasonica hamata Thorell, 1899 – Cameroon
- Prasonica insolens (Simon, 1909) – India, Vietnam, Java
- Prasonica nigrotaeniata (Simon, 1909) – West, Central, East Africa, South Africa
- Prasonica opaciceps (Simon, 1897) – New Guinea
- Prasonica plagiata (Dalmas, 1917) – New Zealand
- Prasonica seriata Simon, 1895 – Africa, Madagascar, Seychelles
