= Matachia similis =

Conservation status
- Data Deficit (NZ TCS)

Scientific classification
- Kingdom: Animalia
- Phylum: Arthropoda
- Subphylum: Chelicerata
- Class: Arachnida
- Order: Araneae
- Infraorder: Araneomorphae
- Family: Desidae
- Genus: Matachia
- Species: M. similis

Binomial name
- Matachia similis Forster, 1970

Species of spider

Matachia similis is a species of Desidae spider that is endemic to New Zealand.

== Taxonomy ==
This species was described by Ray Forster in 1970 from male and female specimens.

== Description ==
The male is recorded at 6.41mm in length whereas the female is 8.16mm. The abdomen is patterned dorsally.

== Distribution ==
This species is only known from Cuvier Island and Northland, New Zealand.

== Conservation status ==
Under the New Zealand Threat Classification System, this species is listed as "Data Deficient" with the qualifiers of "Data Poor: Size" and "Data Poor: Trend".
