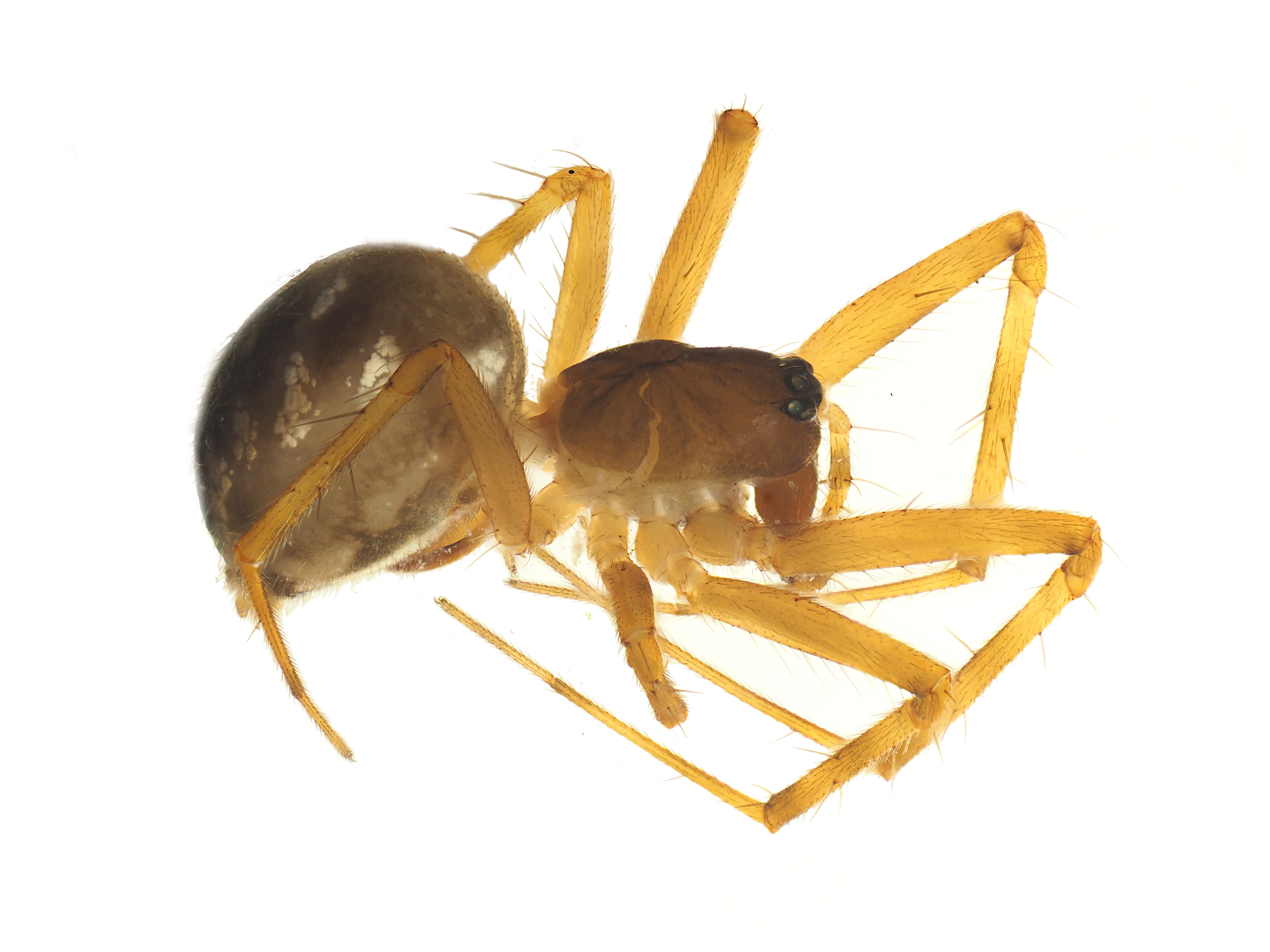

Conservation status
- Not Threatened (NZ TCS)

Scientific classification
- Kingdom: Animalia
- Phylum: Arthropoda
- Subphylum: Chelicerata
- Class: Arachnida
- Order: Araneae
- Infraorder: Araneomorphae
- Family: Linyphiidae
- Genus: Laperousea
- Species: L. blattifera

Binomial name
- Laperousea blattifera (Urquhart, 1887)

Synonyms
- Linyphia blattifer; Linyphia cupidinea; Laperousea arenaria; Laperousea occidentalis; Stylophora blattifera; Bathyphantes blattifera; Prolinyphia cupidinea

= Laperousea blattifera =

Species of spider

Laperousea blattifera is a species of sheet weaver spider found in New Zealand and Australia.

== Taxonomy ==
This species was described as Linyphia blattifer in 1887 by Arthur Urquhart from female specimens. It was most recently revised in 1988. The holotype is stored in Canterbury Museum.

== Description ==
The female is recorded at 2.2-3.1mm in length whereas the male is 2.55-3.1mm. This species has a yellow to brown carapace and legs. The abdomen is variable in colouration and markings.

== Distribution ==
This species is widespread throughout New Zealand.

== Conservation status ==
Under the New Zealand Threat Classification System, this species is listed as "Not Threatened" with the qualifier of "Secure Overseas".
