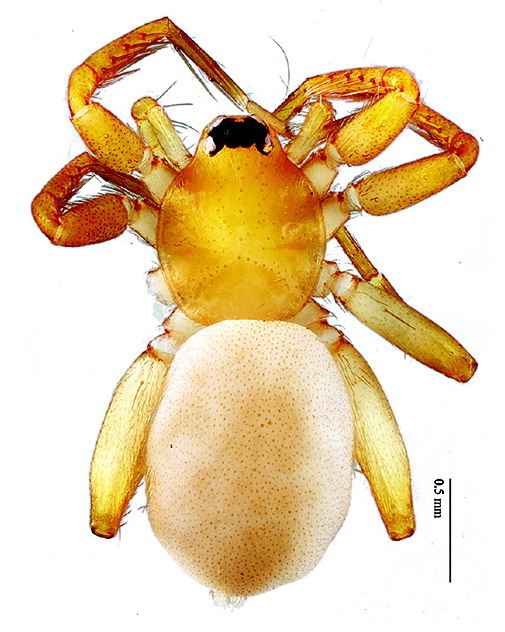
- Heteroonops jurassicus

Scientific classification
- Domain: Eukaryota
- Kingdom: Animalia
- Phylum: Arthropoda
- Subphylum: Chelicerata
- Class: Arachnida
- Order: Araneae
- Infraorder: Araneomorphae
- Family: Oonopidae
- Genus: Heteroonops; Dalmas

Type species
- Heteroonops spinimanus

Species
- 25, see text

= Heteroonops =

Heteroonops Temporal range: Neogene–present

Genus of spiders

Heteroonops is a genus of spiders in the family Oonopidae. It was first described in 1916 by Dalmas. As of July 2021, it contains about 25 species.

== Species ==
As of July 2021, the World Spider Catalog accepts the following species:

- Heteroonops andros Platnick & Dupérré, 2009 – Bahamas
- Heteroonops aylinalegreae Dupérré, 2020 – Dominican Republic
- Heteroonops carlosviquezi Dupérré, 2020 – Dominican Republic
- Heteroonops castelloides Platnick & Dupérré, 2009 – Dominican Republic
- Heteroonops castellus (Chickering, 1971) – Puerto Rico, US Virgin Islands
- Heteroonops colombi Dumitrescu & Georgescu, 1983 – Cuba
- Heteroonops constanza Dupérré, 2020 – Dominican Republic
- Heteroonops croix Platnick & Dupérré, 2009 – US Virgin Islands
- Heteroonops gabrielsantosi Dupérré, 2020 – Dominican Republic
- Heteroonops iviei Platnick & Dupérré, 2009 – Dominican Republic
- Heteroonops jurassicus Dupérré, 2020 – Dominican Republic
- Heteroonops macaque Platnick & Dupérré, 2009 – Dominican Republic
- Heteroonops murphyorum Platnick & Dupérré, 2009 – Costa Rica
- Heteroonops renebarbai Dupérré, 2020 – Dominican Republic
- Heteroonops saba Platnick & Dupérré, 2009 – Caribbean Netherlands (Saba), Montserrat
- Heteroonops scapula Dupérré, 2020 – Dominican Republic
- Heteroonops singulus (Gertsch & Davis, 1942) – Mexico
- Heteroonops solanllycarreroae Dupérré, 2020 – Dominican Republic
- Heteroonops spinigata Platnick & Dupérré, 2009 – Jamaica
- Heteroonops spinimanus (Simon, 1892) (type species) – North to South America, Caribbean; introduced to Macaronesia, Netherlands, Germany, Czechia, Seychelles, Madagascar, Australia, Pacific Islands
- Heteroonops toro Platnick & Dupérré, 2009 – Puerto Rico
- Heteroonops validus (Bryant, 1948) – Dominican Republic
- Heteroonops vega Platnick & Dupérré, 2009 – Dominican Republic
- Heteroonops verruca Dupérré, 2020 – Dominican Republic
- Heteroonops yuma Dupérré, 2020 – Dominican Republic
