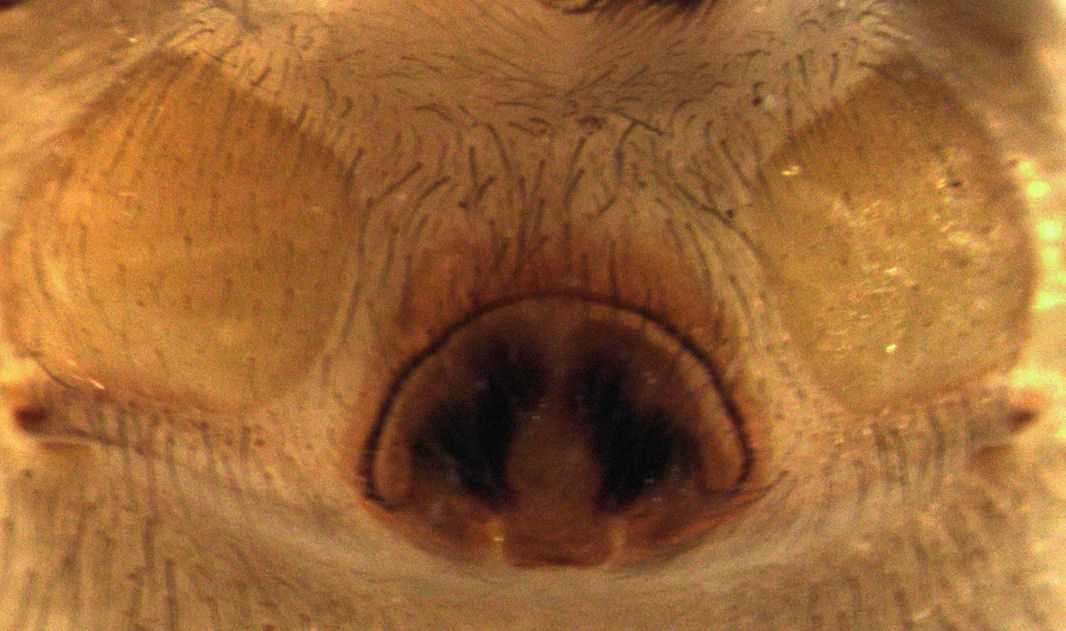
- Hypodrassodes maoricus

Scientific classification
- Kingdom: Animalia
- Phylum: Arthropoda
- Subphylum: Chelicerata
- Class: Arachnida
- Order: Araneae
- Infraorder: Araneomorphae
- Family: Gnaphosidae
- Genus: Hypodrassodes; Dalmas, 1919

Type species
- H. maoricus (Dalmas, 1917)

Species
- 11, see text

= Hypodrassodes =

Genus of spiders

Hypodrassodes is a genus of South Pacific ground spiders that was first described by R. de Dalmas in 1919.

== Species ==
As of May 2019 it contains eleven species:

- Hypodrassodes apicus Forster, 1979 – New Zealand
- Hypodrassodes asbolodes (Rainbow & Pulleine, 1920) – Australia (Lord Howe Is.)
- Hypodrassodes canacus Berland, 1924 – New Caledonia
- Hypodrassodes cockerelli Berland, 1932 – New Caledonia
- Hypodrassodes courti Forster, 1979 – New Zealand
- Hypodrassodes crassus Forster, 1979 – New Zealand
- Hypodrassodes dalmasi Forster, 1979 – New Zealand
- Hypodrassodes ignambensis Berland, 1924 – New Caledonia
- Hypodrassodes insulanus Forster, 1979 – New Zealand
- Hypodrassodes isopus Forster, 1979 – New Zealand
- Hypodrassodes maoricus (Dalmas, 1917) (type) – New Zealand
