= Minosiella =

Scientific classification
- Domain: Eukaryota
- Kingdom: Animalia
- Phylum: Arthropoda
- Subphylum: Chelicerata
- Class: Arachnida
- Order: Araneae
- Infraorder: Araneomorphae
- Family: Gnaphosidae
- Genus: Minosiella; Dalmas, 1921

Type species
- M. mediocris Dalmas, 1921

Species
- 7, see text

Genus of spiders

Minosiella is a genus of ground spiders that was first described by R. de Dalmas in 1921.

== Species ==
As of December 2021 it contains seven species:

- Minosiella apolakia Chatzaki, 2019 – Greece (Rhodes, Karpathos)
- Minosiella intermedia Denis, 1958 – Central Asia, Afghanistan, Iran
- Minosiella mediocris Dalmas, 1921 (type) – Tunisia, Algeria, Egypt, Israel
- Minosiella pallida (L. Koch, 1875) – Egypt, Somalia, Yemen
- Minosiella perimensis Dalmas, 1921 – Yemen
- Minosiella pharia Dalmas, 1921 – Libya, Egypt, Israel
- Minosiella spinigera (Simon, 1882) – Yemen
