= Hypodrassodes insulanus =

Conservation status
- Naturally Uncommon (NZ TCS)

Scientific classification
- Kingdom: Animalia
- Phylum: Arthropoda
- Subphylum: Chelicerata
- Class: Arachnida
- Order: Araneae
- Infraorder: Araneomorphae
- Family: Gnaphosidae
- Genus: Hypodrassodes
- Species: H. insulanus

Binomial name
- Hypodrassodes insulanus Forster, 1979

Species of spider

Hypodrassodes insulanus is a species of ground spider that is endemic to New Zealand.

== Taxonomy ==
This species was described by Ray Forster in 1979 from female specimens. The holotype is stored in the New Zealand Arthropod Collection under registration number NZAC03014964.

== Description ==
The female is recorded at 8.5mm in length.

== Distribution ==
This species is only known from Three Kings Islands, New Zealand.

== Conservation status ==
Under the New Zealand Threat Classification System, this species is listed as "Naturally Uncommon" with the qualifiers of "Range Restricted".
