= Minosia =

Scientific classification
- Kingdom: Animalia
- Phylum: Arthropoda
- Subphylum: Chelicerata
- Class: Arachnida
- Order: Araneae
- Infraorder: Araneomorphae
- Family: Gnaphosidae
- Genus: Minosia; Dalmas, 1921

Type species
- M. spinosissima (Simon, 1878)

Species
- 13, see text

Synonyms
- Crosbyellum Strand, 1934

Genus of spiders

Minosia is a genus of ground spiders that was first described by R. de Dalmas in 1921.

== Species ==
As of May 2019 it contains thirteen species and one subspecies:

- Minosia assimilis Caporiacco, 1941 – Ethiopia, Uganda
- Minosia berlandi Lessert, 1929 – Congo
- Minosia bicalcarata (Simon, 1882) – Yemen
- Minosia clypeolaria (Simon, 1907) – Guinea-Bissau
- Minosia eburneensis Jézéquel, 1965 – Ivory Coast
- Minosia irrugata (Simon, 1907) – Guinea-Bissau
- Minosia karakumensis (Spassky, 1939) – Turkmenistan
- Minosia lynx (Simon, 1886) – Senegal
- Minosia pharao Dalmas, 1921 – Egypt, Israel
  - Minosia p. occidentalis Dalmas, 1921 – Algeria
- Minosia santschii Dalmas, 1921 – Tunisia, Libya
- Minosia senegaliensis Dalmas, 1921 – Senegal
- Minosia simeonica Levy, 1995 – Israel, Iran
- Minosia spinosissima (Simon, 1878) (type) – Spain, France, Israel
