= Raymond Comte de Dalmas =

Raymond de Dalmas (5 February 1862 - 4 February 1930) was a French voyager, arachnologist, and ornithologist.

== Life ==
He was raised in Croatia. During his youth he visited many parts of Europe, Algeria and Iceland. He was only 21 years old when in 1882 he undertook a westward journey around the world.

On September 5, 1882, he left with a friend doctor of Glasgow and arrived in New York on September 14. He traveled across the continent via the Niagara Falls, Chicago, Cheyenne, the Rockies, Ogden, Salt Lake, the Sierra Nevada and San Francisco, where he embarked an American liner Le Gaëlic whose crew was entirely Chinese and arrived on October 19 in Yokohama.

Both entered Tokyo where Dalmas obtained from Governor Tricou the authorization to explore the interior mountains. He then hired a pulled rickshaw that led him to Uruwa, Kumagaya and Takasaki. He climbed Mount Asama to observe Mount Fuji before returning to Komoro and reaching the Shimosuwa thermal station at Lake Suwa. He then crossed the provinces of Mino and Omi and joined Lake Biwa and via a small steam train reached Otsu.

He then visited Kyoto before traveling to Osaka and Kobe. After a three-month stay, he embarked on January 20, 1883, for Hong Kong. He reached Victoria Harbour and Kowloon then fared up the Pearl River to Guangzhou.

He then stopped in Saigon, Singapore and Colombo and returned to Paris on March 6, 1883.

In April–May 1894, he made a trip to the Mediterranean and returned with an album of sixty-four photographs of Greece and Turkey preserved today at the Bibliothèque nationale de France.

== Works ==
- Les Japonais, leur pays et leur mœurs. Voyage autour du monde, préface d'Henri Duveyrier, Plon-Nourrit, 1885
- Japon et Japonais, H. Gautier, 1895
- Croisière du yacht Chazalie en Méditerranée orientale, Alcan-Lévy, 1895

== Taxa ==
=== Taxa described ===
As of February 2025, the World Spider Catalog listed one spider family with Dalmas as the author:

- Stiphidiidae Dalmas, 1917

It listed 22 spider genera, accepted or synonyms, with Dalmas as the author.

- Anzacia Dalmas, 1919
- Berlandia Dalmas, 1921
- Berlandina Dalmas, 1922
- Gohia Dalmas, 1917
- Heteroonops Dalmas, 1916
- Hypodrassodes Dalmas, 1919
- Ixeuticus Dalmas, 1917
- Laperousea Dalmas, 1917
- Matachia Dalmas, 1917
- Microdrassus Dalmas, 1919
- Minosia Dalmas, 1921
- Minosiella Dalmas, 1921
- Nemesiothele Dalmas, 1920
- Nomisia Dalmas, 1921
- Paramatachia Dalmas, 1918
- Prodida Dalmas, 1919
- Proxysticus Dalmas, 1922
- Pterotrichina Dalmas, 1921
- Scotognapha Dalmas, 1920
- Smionia Dalmas, 1920
- Stiphidiellum Dalmas, 1917
- Zimirina Dalmas, 1919

Spider species, accepted or synonyms, described by Dalmas include:

- Anoteropsis albovestita (Dalmas, 1917)
- Anoteropsis arenivaga (Dalmas, 1917)
- Anzacia gemmea (Dalmas, 1917)
- Arangina cornigera (Dalmas, 1917)
- Arangina nigella (Dalmas, 1917)
- Ariadna bellatoria Dalmas, 1917
- Asemesthes modestus Dalmas, 1921
- Asemesthes nigristernus Dalmas, 1921
- Asemesthes perdignus Dalmas, 1921
- Berlandina atlantica (Dalmas, 1921)
- Berlandina deserticola (Dalmas, 1921)
- Berlandina meruana (Dalmas, 1921)
- Berlandina punica (Dalmas, 1921)
- Brachythele varrialei (Dalmas, 1920)
- Cambridgea annulata Dalmas, 1917
- Camillina europaea Dalmas, 1922
- Cozyptila nigristernum (Dalmas, 1922)
- Evarcha nigricans (Dalmas, 1920)
- Habrocestum algericum Dalmas, 1920
- Habrocestum graecum Dalmas, 1920
- Habrocestum ibericum Dalmas, 1920
- Habrocestum lepidum Dalmas, 1920
- Habrocestum nigristernum Dalmas, 1920
- Habrocestum simoni Dalmas, 1920
- Harpactocrates intermedius Dalmas, 1915
- Hemicloea alacris Dalmas, 1917
- Hemicloea celerrima Dalmas, 1917
- Hemicloea tasmani Dalmas, 1917
- Holoplatys senilis Dalmas, 1917
- Hypodrassodes maoricus (Dalmas, 1917)
- Laperousea arenaria Dalmas, 1917
- Laperousea occidentalis Dalmas, 1917
- Lathys simplicior (Dalmas, 1916)
- Leptodrassex algericus (Dalmas, 1919)
- Leptodrassex simoni (Dalmas, 1919)
- Leptodrassus croaticus Dalmas, 1919
- Leptodrassus fragilis Dalmas, 1919
- Leptodrassus licentiosus Dalmas, 1919
- Leptodrassus punicus Dalmas, 1919
- Leptodrassus tropicus Dalmas, 1919
- Leptopilos pupa (Dalmas, 1919)
- Matachia ramulicola Dalmas, 1917
- Minosia pharao Dalmas, 1921
- Minosia santschii Dalmas, 1921
- Minosia senegaliensis Dalmas, 1921
- Minosiella mediocris Dalmas, 1921
- Minosiella perimensis Dalmas, 1921
- Minosiella pharia Dalmas, 1921
- Nomisia australis Dalmas, 1921
- Nomisia castanea Dalmas, 1921
- Nomisia fagei Dalmas, 1921
- Nomisia fortis Dalmas, 1921
- Nomisia mauretanica Dalmas, 1921
- Nomisia notia Dalmas, 1921
- Nomisia orientalis Dalmas, 1921
- Nomisia perpusilla Dalmas, 1921
- Nomisia soror Dalmas, 1921
- Nomisia tingitana Dalmas, 1921
- Nomisia transvaalica Dalmas, 1921
- Oonops amoenus Dalmas, 1916
- Oonops domesticus Dalmas, 1916
- Oonops lubricus Dalmas, 1916
- Oonops placidus Dalmas, 1916
- Oonops rusticulus Dalmas, 1916
- Oonops tubulatus Dalmas, 1916
- Orchestina algerica Dalmas, 1916
- Orchestina arabica Dalmas, 1916
- Orchestina longipes Dalmas, 1922
- Orchestina paupercula Dalmas, 1916
- Orchestina pilifera Dalmas, 1916
- Orchestina setosa Dalmas, 1916
- Orchestina simoni Dalmas, 1916
- Paramatachia decorata Dalmas, 1918
- Phonognatha pallida (Dalmas, 1917)
- Plexippoides gestroi (Dalmas, 1920)
- Prasonica plagiata (Dalmas, 1917)
- Prodidomus djibutensis Dalmas, 1919
- Prodidomus geniculosus Dalmas, 1919
- Prodidomus hispanicus Dalmas, 1919
- Prodidomus longiventris (Dalmas, 1919)
- Prodidomus robustus Dalmas, 1919
- Prodidomus rodolphianus Dalmas, 1919
- Prodidomus simoni Dalmas, 1919
- Prodidomus tigrinus Dalmas, 1919
- Pterotricha aegyptiaca Dalmas, 1921
- Pterotricha algerica Dalmas, 1921
- Pterotricha djibutensis Dalmas, 1921
- Pterotricha fanatica Dalmas, 1921
- Pterotricha insolita Dalmas, 1921
- Pterotricha isiaca Dalmas, 1921
- Pterotricha lesserti Dalmas, 1921
- Pterotricha punctifera Dalmas, 1921
- Pterotricha simoni Dalmas, 1921
- Pterotricha somaliensis Dalmas, 1921
- Pterotricha syriaca Dalmas, 1921
- Pterotricha vicina Dalmas, 1921
- Pterotrichina elegans Dalmas, 1921
- Scotognapha atomaria Dalmas, 1920
- Scotognapha gravieri Dalmas, 1920
- Setaphis algerica (Dalmas, 1922)
- Smionia capensis Dalmas, 1920
- Talanites santschii Dalmas, 1918
- Tegenaria tyrrhenica Dalmas, 1922
- Tetragnatha nigricans Dalmas, 1917
- Trite urvillei (Dalmas, 1917)
- Xysticus doriai (Dalmas, 1922)
- Zelotes funereus (Dalmas, 1921)
- Zelotes insulanus Dalmas, 1922
- Zimirina deserticola Dalmas, 1919
- Zimirina transvaalica Dalmas, 1919
- Zimiris guianensis Dalmas, 1919

=== Taxa named in his honour ===
1. Dalmasula
2. Camponotus dalmasi
3. Hypodrassodes dalmasi
4. Misumenops dalmasi
5. Mogrus dalmasi
6. Myrmelachista dalmasi
7. Neolana dalmasi
8. Orchestina dalmasi
9. Prodidomus dalmasi
10. Pterotricha dalmasi
11. Sertularia dalmasi
12. Thomisus dalmasi
13. Walckenaeria dalmasi
14. Xanthodaphne dalmasi
15. Zoroides dalmasi
16. Tangara lavinia dalmasi
