= Hypodrassodes apicus =

Conservation status
- Not Threatened (NZ TCS)

Scientific classification
- Kingdom: Animalia
- Phylum: Arthropoda
- Subphylum: Chelicerata
- Class: Arachnida
- Order: Araneae
- Infraorder: Araneomorphae
- Family: Gnaphosidae
- Genus: Hypodrassodes
- Species: H. apicus

Binomial name
- Hypodrassodes apicus Forster, 1979

Species of spider

Hypodrassodes apicus is a species of ground spider that is endemic to New Zealand.

== Taxonomy ==
This species was described by Ray Forster in 1979 from a female specimen. The holotype is stored in Otago Museum.

== Description ==
The female is recorded at 7.3mm in length.

== Distribution ==
This species is only known from Cape Reinga, New Zealand.

== Conservation status ==
Under the New Zealand Threat Classification System, this species is listed as "Not Threatened".
