= Leptodrassus licentiosus =

Scientific classification
- Kingdom: Animalia
- Phylum: Arthropoda
- Subphylum: Chelicerata
- Class: Arachnida
- Order: Araneae
- Infraorder: Araneomorphae
- Family: Gnaphosidae
- Genus: Leptodrassus
- Species: L. licentiosus

Binomial name
- Leptodrassus licentiosus Comte de Dalmas, 1919

Species of spider

Leptodrassus licentiosus is a species of spider in the family Gnaphosidae. It is endemic to South Africa.

== Distribution ==
Leptodrassus licentiosus has a very restricted distribution in South Africa's Western Cape province, with a very small range. The species is known only from the type locality at Cape Town at an altitude of 7 m above sea level.

== Habitat and ecology ==
The species inhabits the Fynbos biome and is a free-living ground dweller.

== Conservation ==
Leptodrassus licentiosus is listed as Data Deficient due to insufficient information for a proper conservation assessment. The species has a very small range, and too little is known about the location, habitat and threats for an assessment to be made. More sampling is needed to collect males and determine the species' actual range and conservation status.

== Taxonomy ==
The species was described by Dalmas in 1919 and has not been revised since. The taxonomic placement remains uncertain as only the female is known, and the male is required for proper taxonomic assessment.
