= Zimirina =

Scientific classification
- Kingdom: Animalia
- Phylum: Arthropoda
- Subphylum: Chelicerata
- Class: Arachnida
- Order: Araneae
- Infraorder: Araneomorphae
- Family: Prodidomidae
- Genus: Zimirina; Dalmas, 1919

Type species
- Z. penicillata (Simon, 1893)

Species
- 15, see text

Genus of spiders

Zimirina is a genus of long-spinneret ground spiders that was first described by R. de Dalmas in 1919. It was transferred to the ground spiders in 2018, but was returned to Prodidominae in 2022.

== Species ==
As of August 2022 it contains fifteen species, found in Africa, Portugal, Italy, Spain, and on Saint Helena:

- Zimirina brevipes Pérez & Blasco, 1986 – Spain, Italy (Sardinia)
- Zimirina cineris Cooke, 1964 – Canary Is.
- Zimirina deserticola Dalmas, 1919 – Algeria
- Zimirina gomerae (Schmidt, 1981) – Canary Is.
- Zimirina grancanariensis Wunderlich, 1992 – Canary Is.
- Zimirina hirsuta Cooke, 1964 – Canary Is.
- Zimirina lepida (Blackwall, 1859) – Madeira
- Zimirina moyaensis Wunderlich, 1992 – Canary Is.
- Zimirina nabavii Wunderlich, 2011 – Canary Is.
- Zimirina penicillata (Simon, 1893) (type) – Algeria
- Zimirina relegata Cooke, 1977 – St. Helena
- Zimirina spinicymbia Wunderlich, 1992 – Canary Is.
- Zimirina tenuidens Denis, 1956 – Morocco
- Zimirina transvaalica Dalmas, 1919 – South Africa
- Zimirina vastitatis Cooke, 1964 – Libya, Egypt
