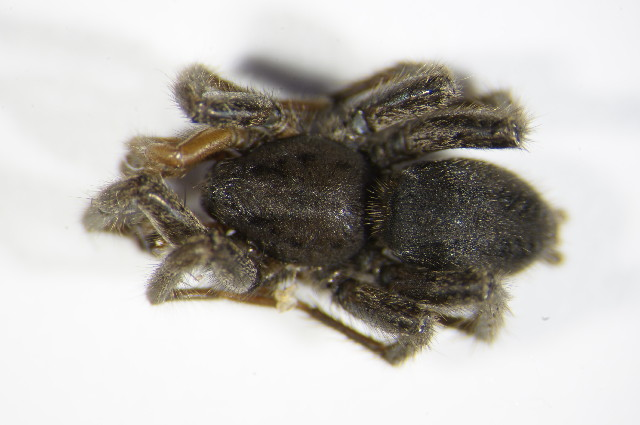
- B. cinerea

Scientific classification
- Kingdom: Animalia
- Phylum: Arthropoda
- Subphylum: Chelicerata
- Class: Arachnida
- Order: Araneae
- Infraorder: Araneomorphae
- Family: Gnaphosidae
- Genus: Berlandina; Dalmas, 1922

Type species
- B. plumalis (O. Pickard-Cambridge, 1872)

Species
- 43, see text

= Berlandina =

Genus of spiders

Berlandina is a genus of ground spiders that was first described by Raymond de Dalmas in 1922.

== Species ==
As of May 2026 it contains 43 species:

- Berlandina afghana Denis, 1958 – Iran, Afghanistan, Pakistan
- Berlandina apscheronica Dunin, 1984 – Russia (Europe), Azerbaijan, Kazakhstan
- Berlandina artaxerxes Zamani et al., 2021 – Iran
- Berlandina asbenica Denis, 1955 – Niger
- Berlandina avishur Levy, 2009 – Israel
- Berlandina caspica Ponomarev, 1979 – Russia (Europe to Central Asia), Caucasus, Iran, Central Asia, Mongolia
- Berlandina charitonovi Ponomarev, 1979 – Russia (Europe, Caucasus), Azerbaijan, Kazakhstan
- Berlandina cinerea (Menge, 1872) – Europe, Russia (Europe to South Siberia), Iran, Kazakhstan
- Berlandina corcyraea (O. Pickard-Cambridge, 1874) – Albania, Greece (incl. Corfu)
- Berlandina denisi Roewer, 1961 – Afghanistan
- Berlandina deserticola (Dalmas, 1921) – Algeria, Libya
- Berlandina drassodea (Caporiacco, 1934) – Karakorum
- Berlandina hui Song, Zhu & Zhang, 2004 – China
- Berlandina ilika Fomichev & Marusik, 2019 – Kazakhstan
- Berlandina izzatullaevi Shodmonov & Fomichev, 2025 – Uzbekistan
- Berlandina jabborovi Shodmonov & Fomichev, 2025 – Uzbekistan
- Berlandina khalimovi Shodmonov & Fomichev, 2025 – Uzbekistan
- Berlandina kolosvaryi Caporiacco, 1947 – East Africa
- Berlandina koponeni Marusik, Fomichev & Omelko, 2014 – Mongolia, China
- Berlandina litvinovi Fomichev & Marusik, 2017 – Mongolia
- Berlandina meruana (Dalmas, 1921) – East Africa
- Berlandina mesopotamica Al-Khazali, 2020 – Iran
- Berlandina mishenini Marusik, Fomichev & Omelko, 2014 – Mongolia
- Berlandina nabozhenkoi Ponomarev & Tsvetkov, 2006 – Russia (Europe)
- Berlandina nakonechnyi Marusik, Fomichev & Omelko, 2014 – Mongolia
- Berlandina nenilini Ponomarev & Tsvetkov, 2006 – Kazakhstan
- Berlandina nigromaculata (Blackwall, 1865) – Cape Verde Is.
- Berlandina nubivaga (Simon, 1878) – Alps (France, Italy, Switzerland), Macedonia, Bulgaria
- Berlandina obscurata Caporiacco, 1947 – East Africa
- Berlandina ovtsharenkoi Marusik, Fomichev & Omelko, 2014 – Mongolia
- Berlandina piephoi Schmidt, 1994 – Cape Verde Is.
- Berlandina plumalis (O. Pickard-Cambridge, 1872) (type) – West Africa, Mediterranean to Central Asia, Iran
- Berlandina potanini Schenkel, 1963 – Russia (South Siberia), Mongolia, China
- Berlandina propinqua Roewer, 1961 – Afghanistan
- Berlandina pulchra (Nosek, 1905) – Turkey
- Berlandina punica (Dalmas, 1921) – Algeria, Tunisia, Libya
- Berlandina saraevi Ponomarev, 2008 – Kazakhstan
- Berlandina schenkeli Marusik & Logunov, 1995 – Russia (South Siberia)
- Berlandina shnitnikovi (Spassky, 1934) – Kazakhstan
- Berlandina shumskyi Kovblyuk, 2003 – Ukraine
- Berlandina spasskyi Ponomarev, 1979 – Russia (Europe), Kazakhstan, Mongolia, China
- Berlandina ubsunurica Marusik & Logunov, 1995 – Russia (South Siberia), Mongolia
- Berlandina venatrix (O. Pickard-Cambridge, 1874) – Libya, Egypt
- Berlandina yakovlevi Marusik, Fomichev & Omelko, 2014 – Mongolia
