= Leptodrassus bergensis =

Scientific classification
- Kingdom: Animalia
- Phylum: Arthropoda
- Subphylum: Chelicerata
- Class: Arachnida
- Order: Araneae
- Infraorder: Araneomorphae
- Family: Gnaphosidae
- Genus: Leptodrassus
- Species: L. bergensis

Binomial name
- Leptodrassus bergensis Tucker, 1923

Species of spider

Leptodrassus bergensis is a species of spider in the family Gnaphosidae. It is endemic to South Africa.

== Distribution ==
Leptodrassus bergensis has a very restricted distribution in South Africa's Western Cape province. The species is known only from the type locality at Matroosberg, Ceres, at an altitude of 980 m above sea level.

== Habitat and ecology ==
The species inhabits the Fynbos biome and is a free-living ground dweller. Only three specimens were collected in 1917, and no additional specimens have been recorded since the original description.

== Conservation ==
Leptodrassus bergensis is listed as Data Deficient due to insufficient information for a proper conservation assessment. More sampling is needed to collect males and determine the species' actual range and conservation status.

== Taxonomy ==
The species was described by Tucker in 1923 and has not been revised since. The taxonomic placement remains uncertain as only the female is known, and the male is required for proper taxonomic assessment.
