= Pterotrichina =

Scientific classification
- Domain: Eukaryota
- Kingdom: Animalia
- Phylum: Arthropoda
- Subphylum: Chelicerata
- Class: Arachnida
- Order: Araneae
- Infraorder: Araneomorphae
- Family: Gnaphosidae
- Genus: Pterotrichina; Dalmas, 1921

Type species
- P. elegans Dalmas, 1921

Species
- P. elegans Dalmas, 1921 – Algeria, Tunisia; P. nova Caporiacco, 1934 – Karakorum

Genus of spiders

Pterotrichina is a genus of ground spiders that was first described by R. de Dalmas in 1921. As of May 2019 it contains only two species: P. elegans and P. nova.
