= Hypodrassodes isopus =

Conservation status
- Not Threatened (NZ TCS)

Scientific classification
- Kingdom: Animalia
- Phylum: Arthropoda
- Subphylum: Chelicerata
- Class: Arachnida
- Order: Araneae
- Infraorder: Araneomorphae
- Family: Gnaphosidae
- Genus: Hypodrassodes
- Species: H. isopus

Binomial name
- Hypodrassodes isopus Forster, 1979

Species of spider

Hypodrassodes isopus is a species of ground spider that is endemic to New Zealand.

== Taxonomy ==
This species was described by Ray Forster in 1979 from a male specimen. The holotype is stored in Te Papa Museum under registration number AS.000056.

== Description ==
The male is recorded at 8mm in length.

== Distribution ==
This species is only known from Waikaremoana, New Zealand.

== Conservation status ==
Under the New Zealand Threat Classification System, this species is listed as "Not Threatened" with the qualifiers of "Data Poor: Size", "Data Poor: Trend" and "Biologically Sparse".
