= Matachia livor =

Conservation status
- Not Threatened (NZ TCS)

Scientific classification
- Domain: Eukaryota
- Kingdom: Animalia
- Phylum: Arthropoda
- Subphylum: Chelicerata
- Class: Arachnida
- Order: Araneae
- Infraorder: Araneomorphae
- Family: Desidae
- Genus: Matachia
- Species: M. livor

Binomial name
- Matachia livor (Urquhart, 1893)

Synonyms
- Tegenaria livoris; Urquhartia livoris; Matachia ramulicola; Matachia livoris

Species of spider

Matachia livor is a species of Desidae spider that is endemic to New Zealand.

== Taxonomy ==
This species was first described by Arthur Urquhart in 1893 from a male specimen. It has undergone numerous revisions. The holotype is stored in Canterbury Museum.

== Description ==
The male is recorded at 7.66mm in length whereas the female is 7.20mm. The abdomen has a prominent chevron pattern dorsally.

== Distribution ==
This species is widespread throughout the North Island of New Zealand.

== Conservation status ==
Under the New Zealand Threat Classification System, this species is listed as "Not Threatened".
