= Prodida =

Scientific classification
- Kingdom: Animalia
- Phylum: Arthropoda
- Subphylum: Chelicerata
- Class: Arachnida
- Order: Araneae
- Infraorder: Araneomorphae
- Family: Prodidomidae
- Genus: Prodida; Dalmas, 1919

Type species
- P. longiventris Dalmas, 1919

Species
- P. longiventris Dalmas, 1919 – Philippines; P. stella Saaristo, 2002 – Seychelles

Genus of spiders

Prodida is a genus of ground spiders that was first described by R. de Dalmas in 1919. As of June 2019 it contains only two species, found only on the Seychelles and in the Philippines: P. longiventris and P. stella.
