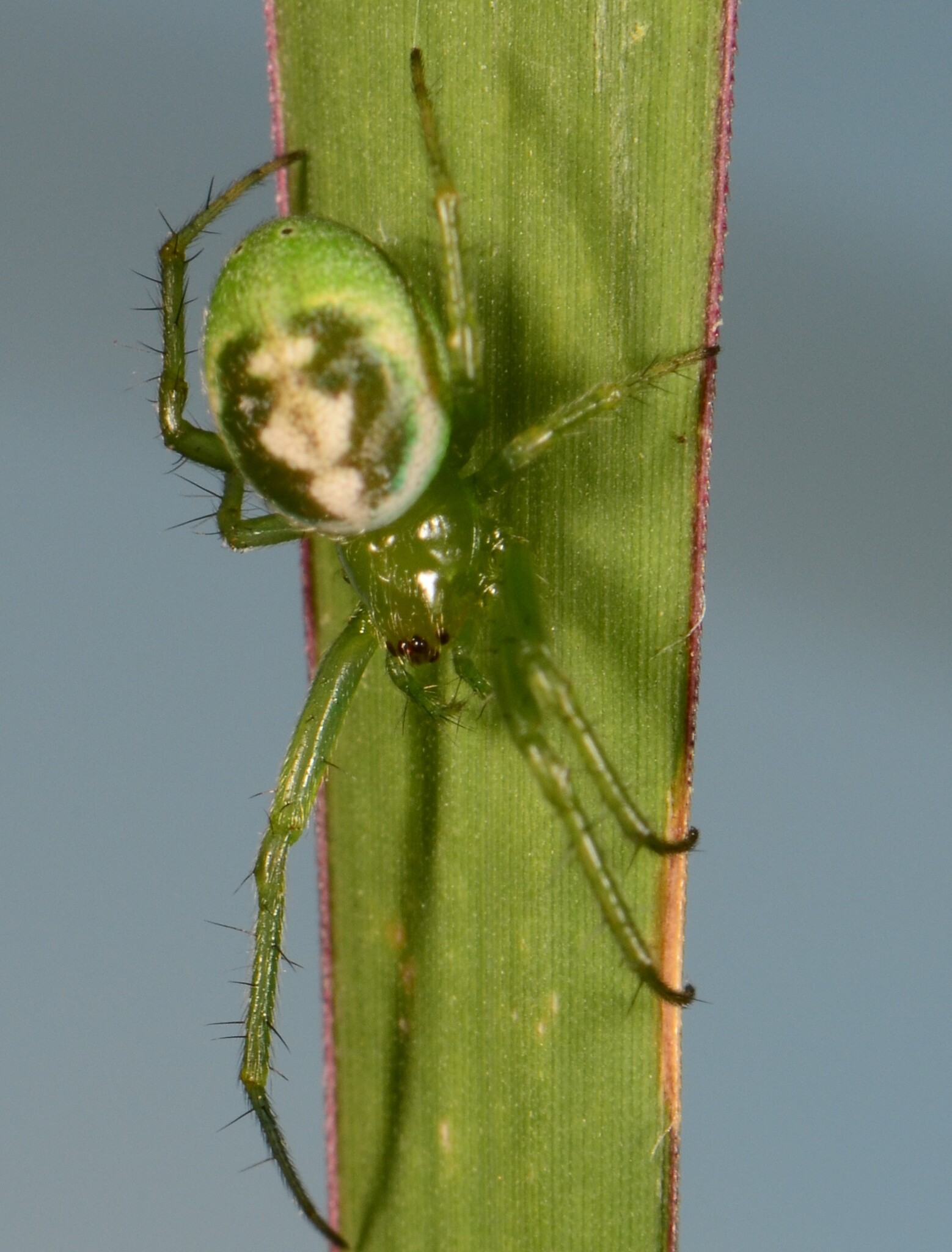
- Female
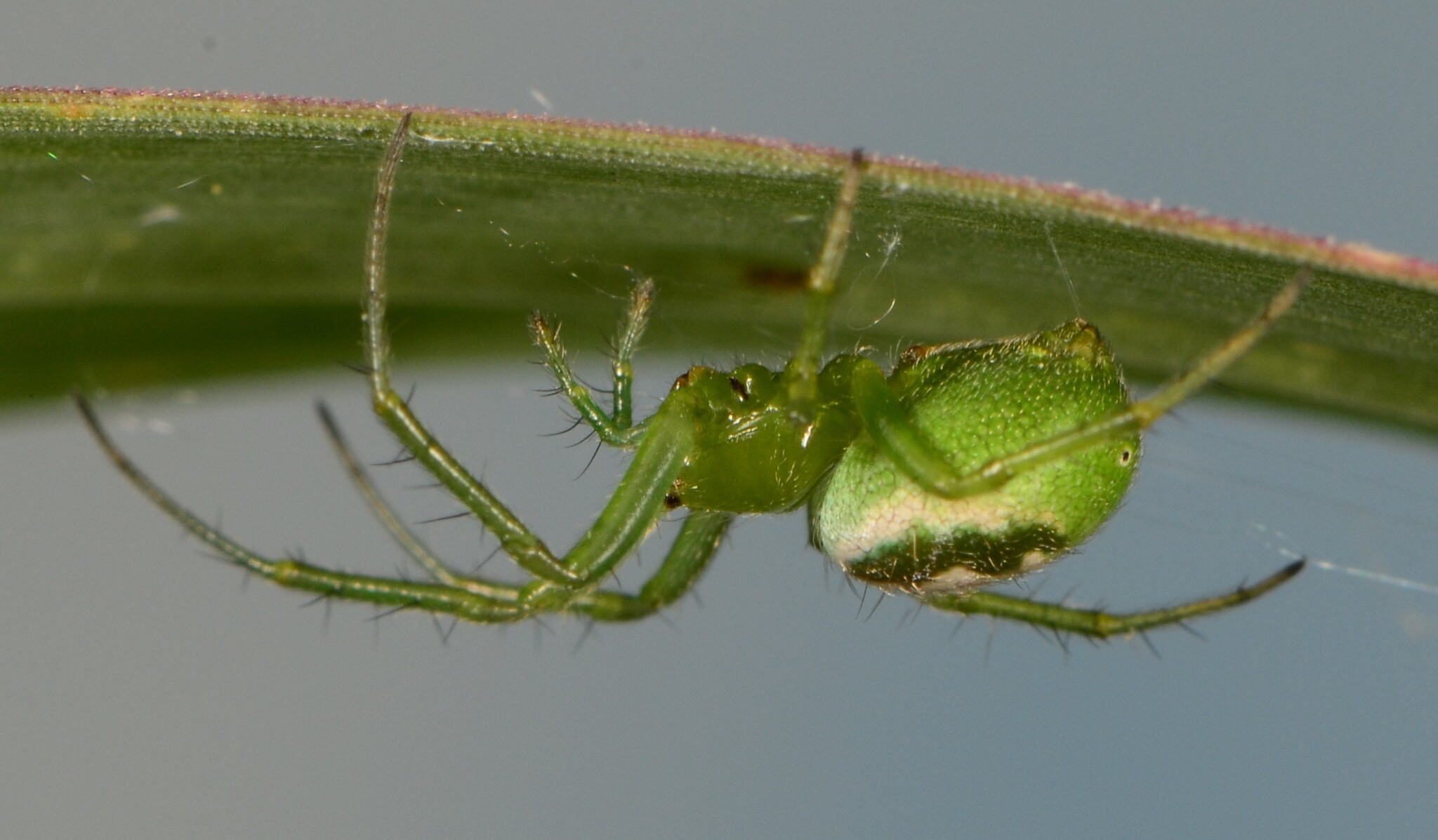
- Female

Scientific classification
- Kingdom: Animalia
- Phylum: Arthropoda
- Subphylum: Chelicerata
- Class: Arachnida
- Order: Araneae
- Infraorder: Araneomorphae
- Family: Araneidae
- Genus: Prasonica
- Species: P. nigrotaeniata

Binomial name
- Prasonica nigrotaeniata (Simon, 1909)

Synonyms
- Mangora nigrotaeniata Simon, 1909; Mangora spillmanni Lessert, 1933; Zilla spillmanni (Caporiacco, 1947)

= Prasonica nigrotaeniata =

Species of spider

Prasonica nigrotaeniata is an African species of spider in the family Araneidae.

== Distribution ==
Prasonica nigrotaeniata has a wide distribution throughout West, Central, and East Africa, as well as South Africa. In South Africa, it has been recorded from four provinces: Gauteng, KwaZulu-Natal, Limpopo, and Mpumalanga.

== Habitat and ecology ==
The species inhabits altitudes ranging from 526 to 1,444 m above sea level and has been sampled from the Grassland and Savanna biomes. Prasonica nigrotaeniata constructs orb webs in low vegetation. When not active, the spider weaves a silk retreat below a leaf.

== Description ==
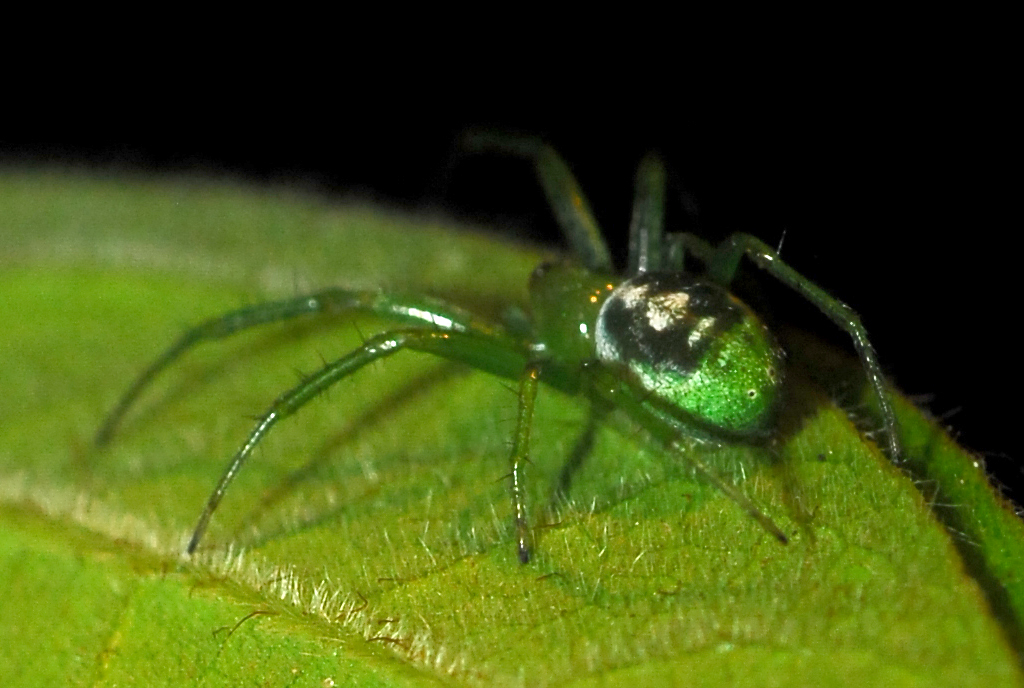
female

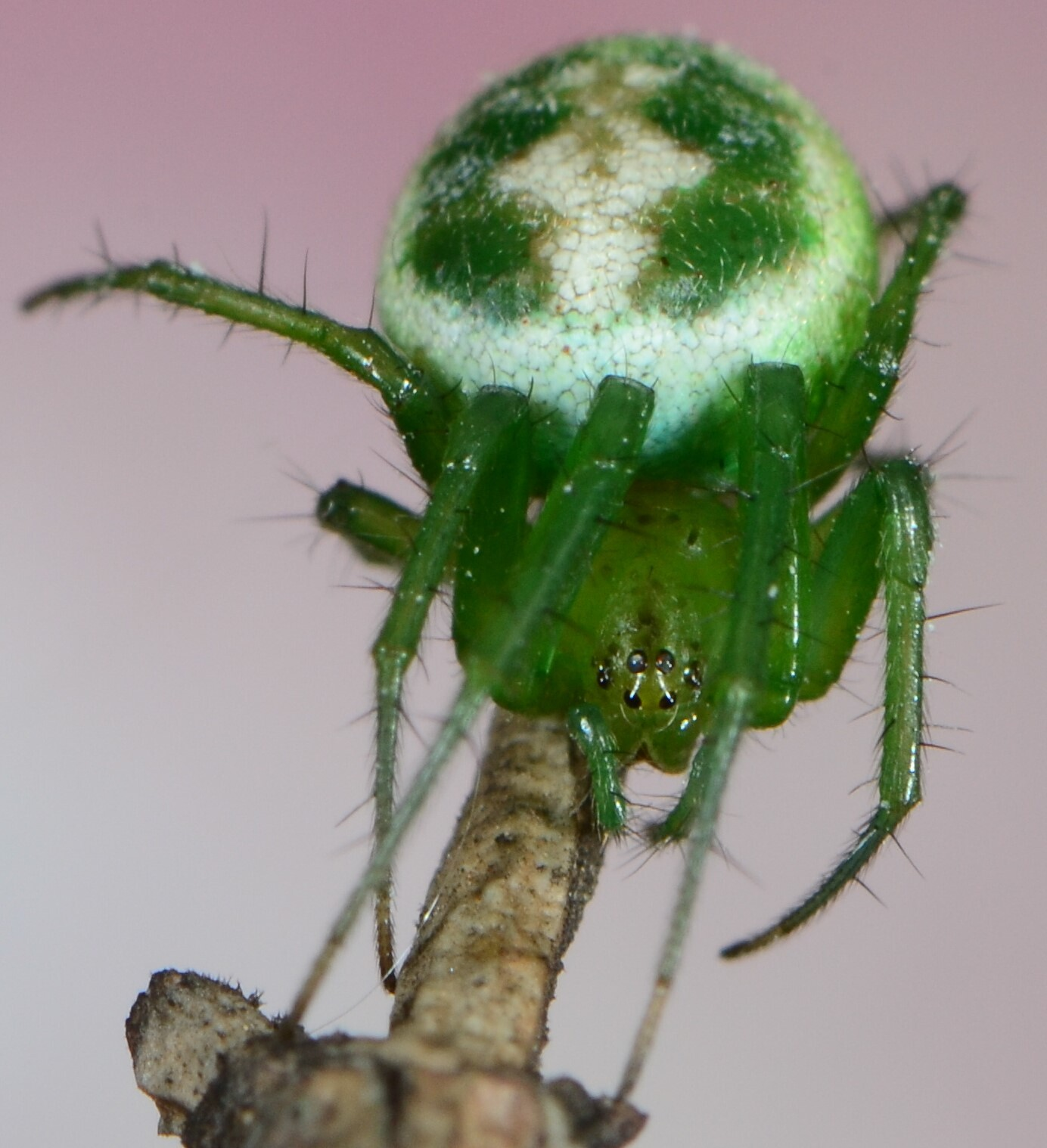
female

== Conservation ==
Prasonica nigrotaeniata is listed as Least Concern by the South African National Biodiversity Institute due to its wide geographical range throughout Africa. The species is protected in the Pretoria National Botanical Garden.

== Taxonomy ==
The species was originally described by Eugène Simon in 1909 as Mangora nigrotaeniata from Kenya. It was later revised by Grasshoff in 1971, who transferred it to the genus Prasonica and synonymized Mangora spillmanni and Zilla spillmanni with this species. The species is known only from females.
