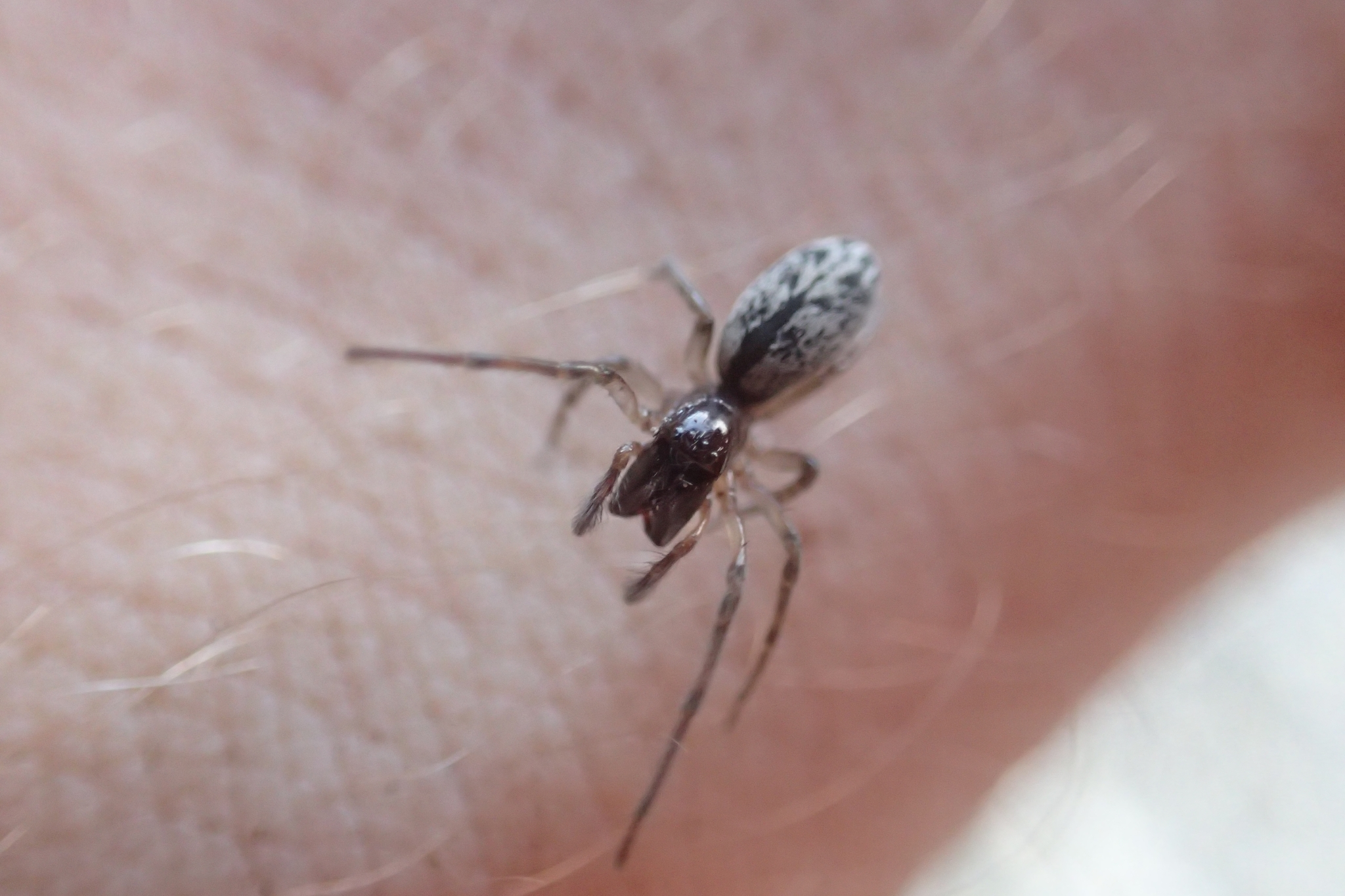
- Matachia spp. found in the Hen and Chicken Islands, New Zealand

Scientific classification
- Kingdom: Animalia
- Phylum: Arthropoda
- Subphylum: Chelicerata
- Class: Arachnida
- Order: Araneae
- Infraorder: Araneomorphae
- Family: Desidae
- Genus: Matachia; Dalmas, 1917

Type species
- M. ramulicola Dalmas, 1917

Species
- 5, see text

Synonyms
- Urquhartia Bryant, 1933

= Matachia =

Genus of spiders

Matachia is a genus of South Pacific intertidal spiders that was first described by R. de Dalmas in 1917. Originally placed with the Psechridae, it was moved to the intertidal spiders in 1970.

== Species ==
As of May 2019 it contains five species, all found in New Zealand:

- Matachia australis Forster, 1970 – New Zealand
- Matachia livor (Urquhart, 1893) – New Zealand
- Matachia marplesi Forster, 1970 – New Zealand
- Matachia ramulicola Dalmas, 1917 (type) – New Zealand
- Matachia similis Forster, 1970 – New Zealand
