= Scotognapha =

Scientific classification
- Kingdom: Animalia
- Phylum: Arthropoda
- Subphylum: Chelicerata
- Class: Arachnida
- Order: Araneae
- Infraorder: Araneomorphae
- Family: Gnaphosidae
- Genus: Scotognapha; Dalmas, 1920

Type species
- S. convexa (Simon, 1883)

Species
- 14, see text

Genus of spiders

Scotognapha is a genus of European ground spiders that was first described by R. de Dalmas in 1920.

== Species ==
As of May 2019 it contains fourteen species, all from the Canary Islands and the Savage Islands:

- Scotognapha arcuata Wunderlich, 2011 – Canary Is.
- Scotognapha atomaria Dalmas, 1920 – Canary Is.
- Scotognapha brunnea Schmidt, 1980 – Canary Is.
- Scotognapha canaricola (Strand, 1911) – Canary Is.
- Scotognapha convexa (Simon, 1883) (type) – Canary Is.
- Scotognapha costacalma Platnick, Ovtsharenko & Murphy, 2001 – Canary Is.
- Scotognapha galletas Platnick, Ovtsharenko & Murphy, 2001 – Canary Is.
- Scotognapha haria Platnick, Ovtsharenko & Murphy, 2001 – Canary Is.
- Scotognapha juangrandica Platnick, Ovtsharenko & Murphy, 2001 – Canary Is.
- Scotognapha medano Platnick, Ovtsharenko & Murphy, 2001 – Canary Is.
- Scotognapha paivani (Blackwall, 1864) – Selvagens Is.
- Scotognapha taganana Platnick, Ovtsharenko & Murphy, 2001 – Canary Is.
- Scotognapha teideensis (Wunderlich, 1992) – Canary Is.
- Scotognapha wunderlichi Platnick, Ovtsharenko & Murphy, 2001 – Canary Is.
