= Paramatachia =

Scientific classification
- Kingdom: Animalia
- Phylum: Arthropoda
- Subphylum: Chelicerata
- Class: Arachnida
- Order: Araneae
- Infraorder: Araneomorphae
- Family: Desidae
- Genus: Paramatachia; Dalmas, 1918

Type species
- P. decorata Dalmas, 1918

Species
- 5, see text

Synonyms
- Neomatachia Hickman, 1950

Genus of spiders

Paramatachia is a genus of Australian intertidal spiders that was first described by R. de Dalmas in 1918.

== Species ==
As of May 2019 it contains five species:

- Paramatachia ashtonensis Marples, 1962 – Australia (New South Wales)
- Paramatachia cataracta Marples, 1962 – Australia (New South Wales)
- Paramatachia decorata Dalmas, 1918 (type) – Australia (Queensland)
- Paramatachia media Marples, 1962 – Australia (Victoria)
- Paramatachia tubicola (Hickman, 1950) – Australia (South Australia, Tasmania)
