= Matachia australis =

Conservation status
- Not Threatened (NZ TCS)

Scientific classification
- Kingdom: Animalia
- Phylum: Arthropoda
- Subphylum: Chelicerata
- Class: Arachnida
- Order: Araneae
- Infraorder: Araneomorphae
- Family: Desidae
- Genus: Matachia
- Species: M. australis

Binomial name
- Matachia australis Forster, 1970

Species of spider

Matachia australis is a species of Desidae spider that is endemic to New Zealand.

== Taxonomy ==
This species was described by Ray Forster in 1970 from male and female specimens.

== Description ==
The male is recorded at 6.8mm in length whereas the female is 7.05mm.

== Distribution ==
This species is only known from the south of the South Island of New Zealand.

== Conservation status ==
Under the New Zealand Threat Classification System, this species is listed as "Not Threatened".
