= Matachia ramulicola =

Conservation status
- Data Deficient (NZ TCS)

Scientific classification
- Domain: Eukaryota
- Kingdom: Animalia
- Phylum: Arthropoda
- Subphylum: Chelicerata
- Class: Arachnida
- Order: Araneae
- Infraorder: Araneomorphae
- Family: Desidae
- Genus: Matachia
- Species: M. ramulicola

Binomial name
- Matachia ramulicola Dalmas, 1917

Synonyms
- Matachia livoris

Species of spider

Matachia ramulicola is a species of Desidae spider that is endemic to New Zealand.

== Taxonomy ==
This species was described by Raymond Comte de Dalmas in 1917 from female specimens. It was most recently revised in 1970. The holotype is stored in the National Museum of Natural History, France.

== Description ==
The female is recorded at 9.01mm in length. The abdomen has a distinctive pattern dorsally.

== Distribution ==
This species is only known from Nelson, New Zealand.

== Conservation status ==
Under the New Zealand Threat Classification System, this species is listed as "Data Deficient" with the qualifiers of "Data Poor: Size" and "Data Poor: Trend".
