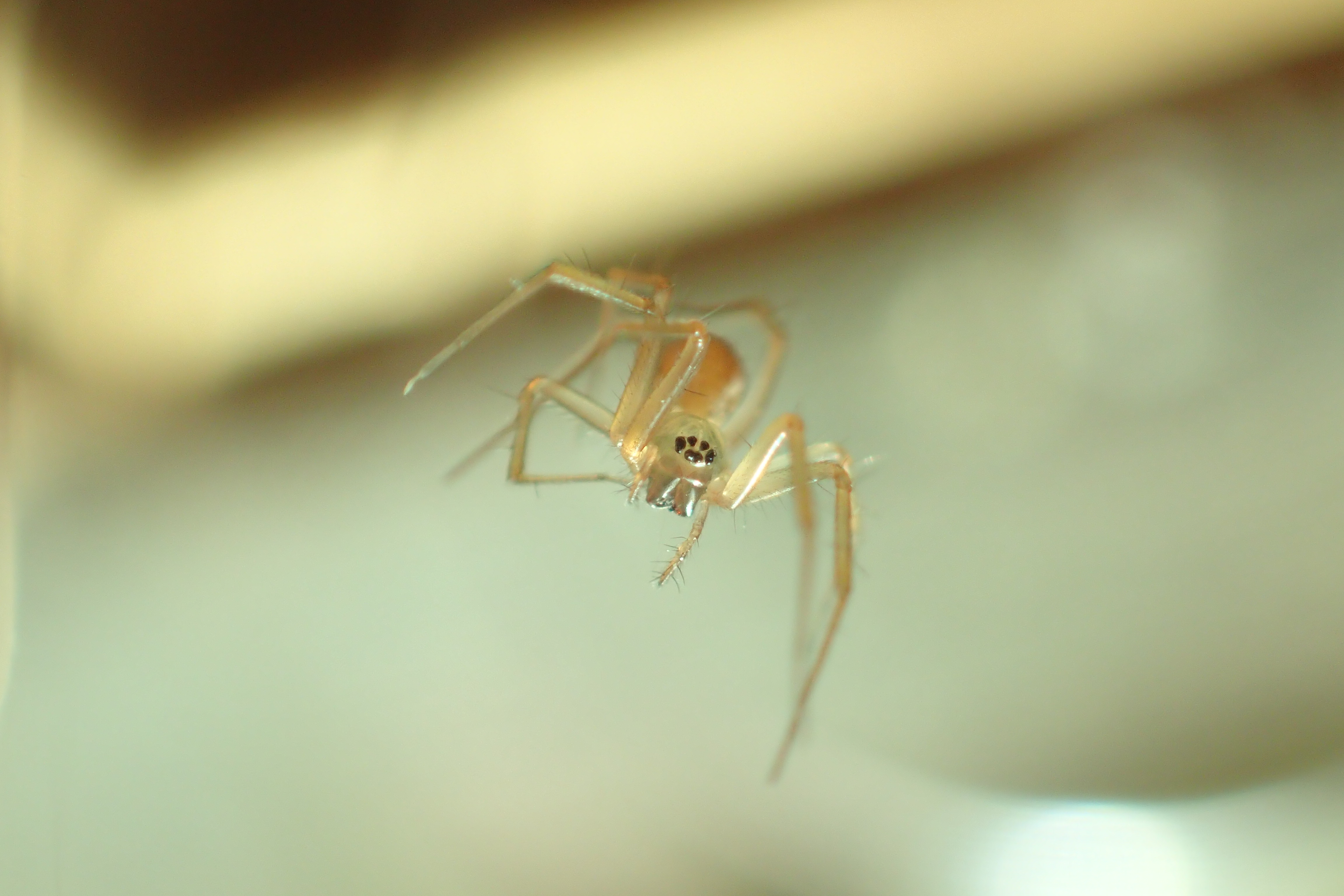
- Laperousea sp., found in Tasmania

Scientific classification
- Kingdom: Animalia
- Phylum: Arthropoda
- Subphylum: Chelicerata
- Class: Arachnida
- Order: Araneae
- Infraorder: Araneomorphae
- Family: Linyphiidae
- Genus: Laperousea; Dalmas, 1917

Type species
- L. blattifera (Urquhart, 1887)

Species
- L. blattifera (Urquhart, 1887) – Australia, New Zealand; L. quindecimpunctata (Urquhart, 1893) – Australia (Tasmania)

= Laperousea =

Genus of spiders

Laperousea is a genus of South Pacific dwarf spiders that was first described by R. de Dalmas in 1917. As of May 2019 it contains only two species, both found in Australia and New Zealand: L. blattifera and L. quindecimpunctata.
