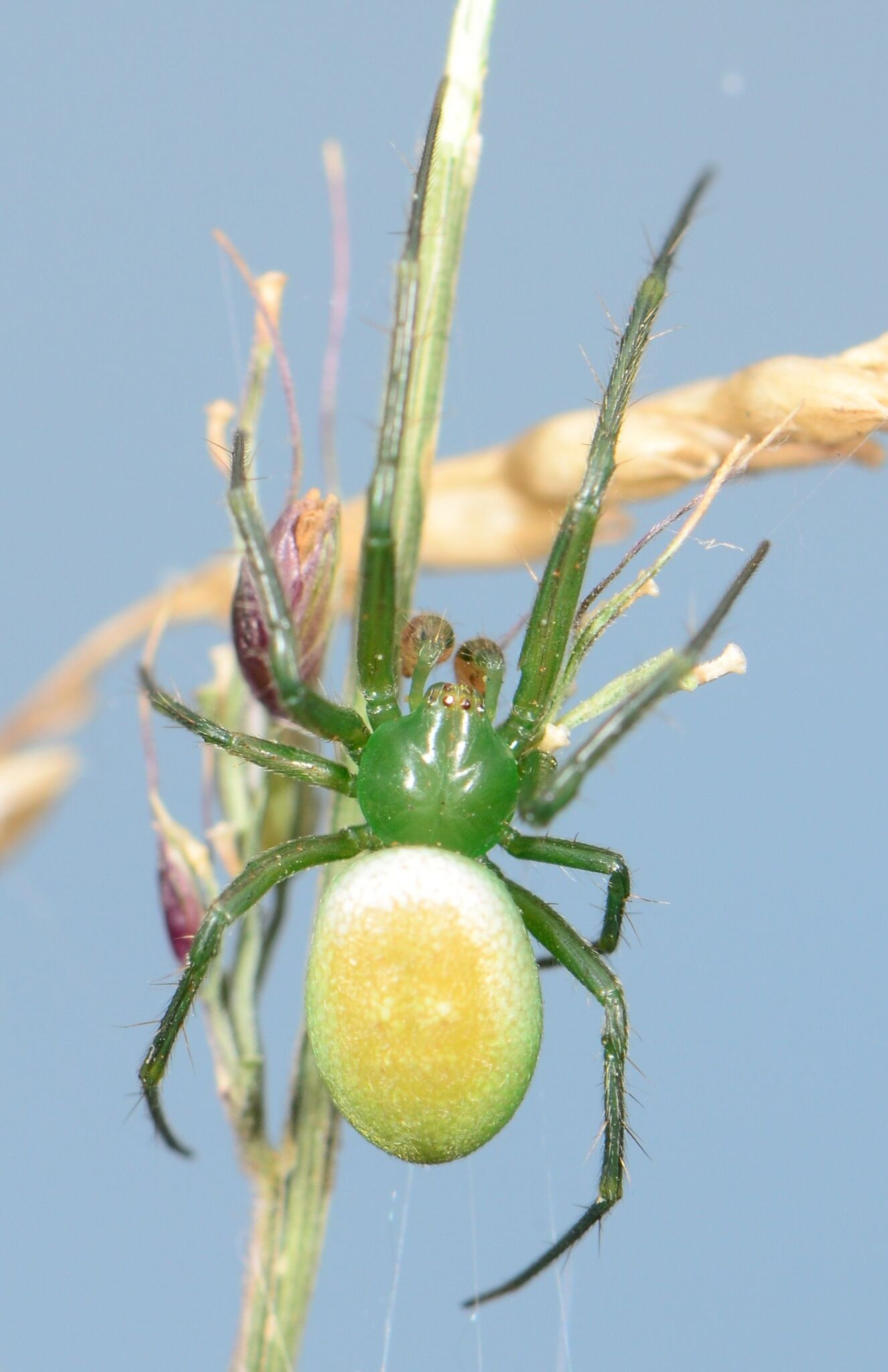
- Juvenile male
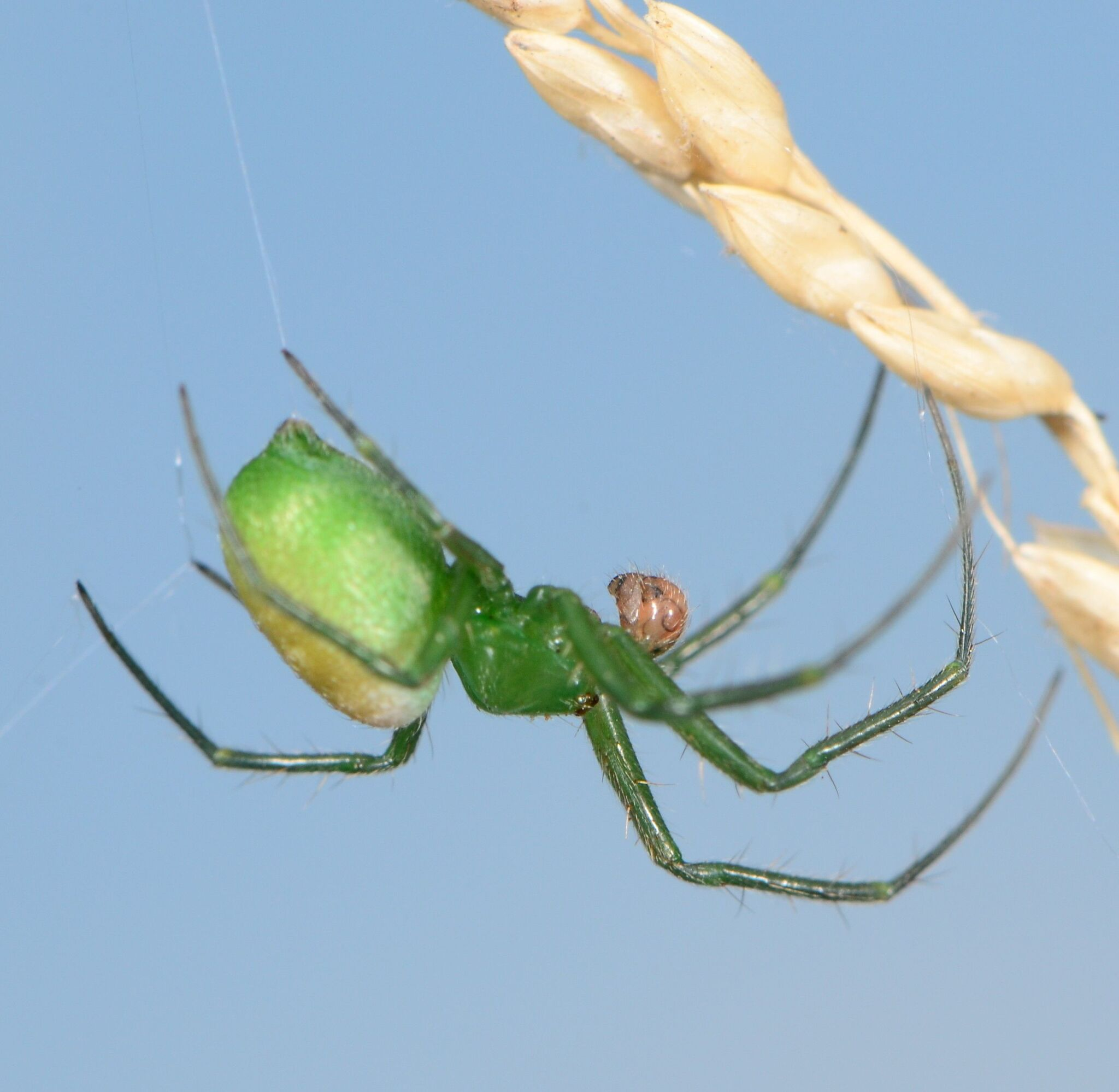
- Juvenile male

Scientific classification
- Kingdom: Animalia
- Phylum: Arthropoda
- Subphylum: Chelicerata
- Class: Arachnida
- Order: Araneae
- Infraorder: Araneomorphae
- Family: Araneidae
- Genus: Prasonica
- Species: P. albolimbata

Binomial name
- Prasonica albolimbata Simon, 1895

= Prasonica albolimbata =

Species of spider

Prasonica albolimbata is a comman African species of spider in the family Araneidae.

== Distribution ==
Prasonica albolimbata occurs in the Democratic Republic of the Congo, South Africa, Madagascar, and Yemen. In South Africa, it has been recorded from Mpumalanga at Loskopdam and Middelburg.

== Habitat and ecology ==
The species inhabits altitudes ranging from 67 to 1,451 m above sea level and has been sampled from the Savanna biome. Prasonica albolimbata constructs orb webs in low vegetation. When not active, the spider weaves a silk retreat below a leaf.

== Conservation ==
Prasonica albolimbata is listed as Least Concern by the South African National Biodiversity Institute due to its wide geographical range across multiple African countries. The species is protected in the Roodeplaatdam Nature Reserve, Makalali Nature Reserve, and Ndumo Game Reserve.

== Taxonomy ==
The species was originally described by Eugène Simon in 1895. It was later revised by Grasshoff in 1971. P. albolimbata is known only from females.
