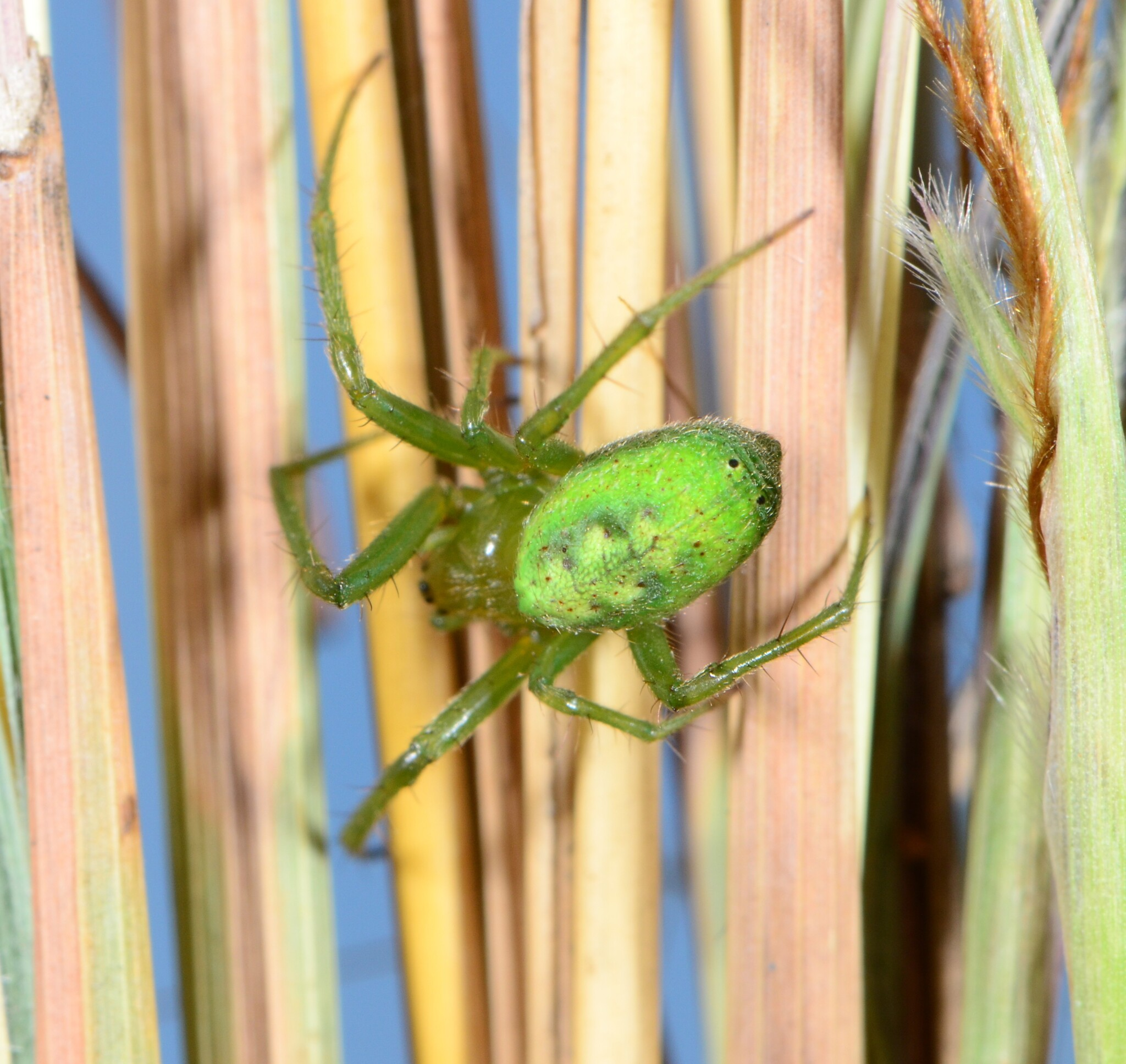
- Female

Scientific classification
- Kingdom: Animalia
- Phylum: Arthropoda
- Subphylum: Chelicerata
- Class: Arachnida
- Order: Araneae
- Infraorder: Araneomorphae
- Family: Araneidae
- Genus: Prasonica
- Species: P. seriata

Binomial name
- Prasonica seriata Simon, 1895

Synonyms
- Spilasma africana Simon, 1903

= Prasonica seriata =

African Cucumber Orb-web Spider

Species of spider

Prasonica seriata is a species of spider in the family Araneidae. It is an African endemic species commonly known as the African cucumber orb-web spider.

== Distribution ==
Prasonica seriata is widespread in Africa, Madagascar, and the Seychelles. In South Africa, it is known from seven provinces (excluding Free State and Northern Cape).

== Habitat and ecology ==
The species inhabits altitudes ranging from 7 to 1,902 m above sea level and has been sampled from the Savanna and Thicket biomes. Prasonica seriata constructs orb webs in low vegetation. When not active, the spider weaves a silk retreat below a leaf.

== Description ==
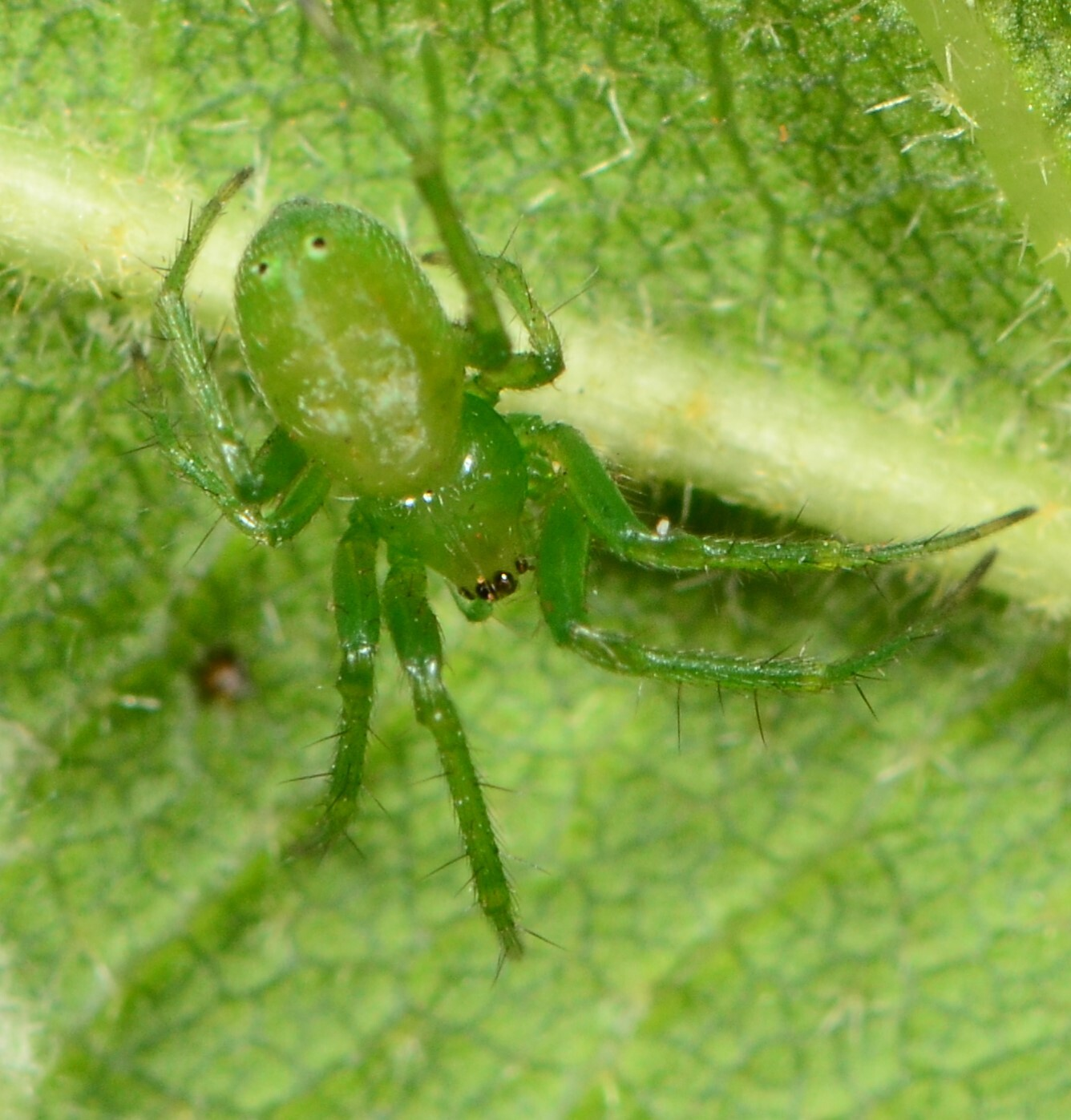
female

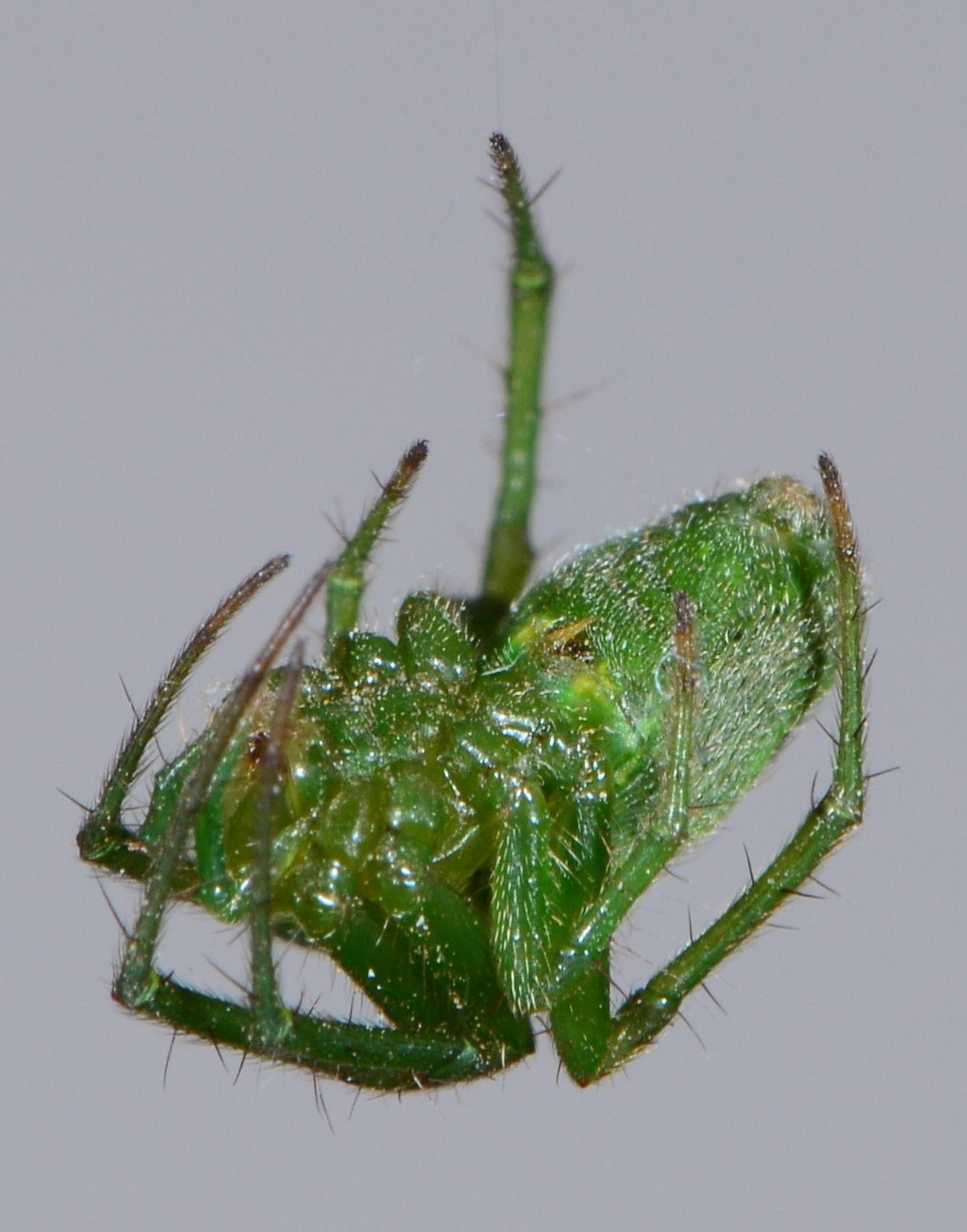
female

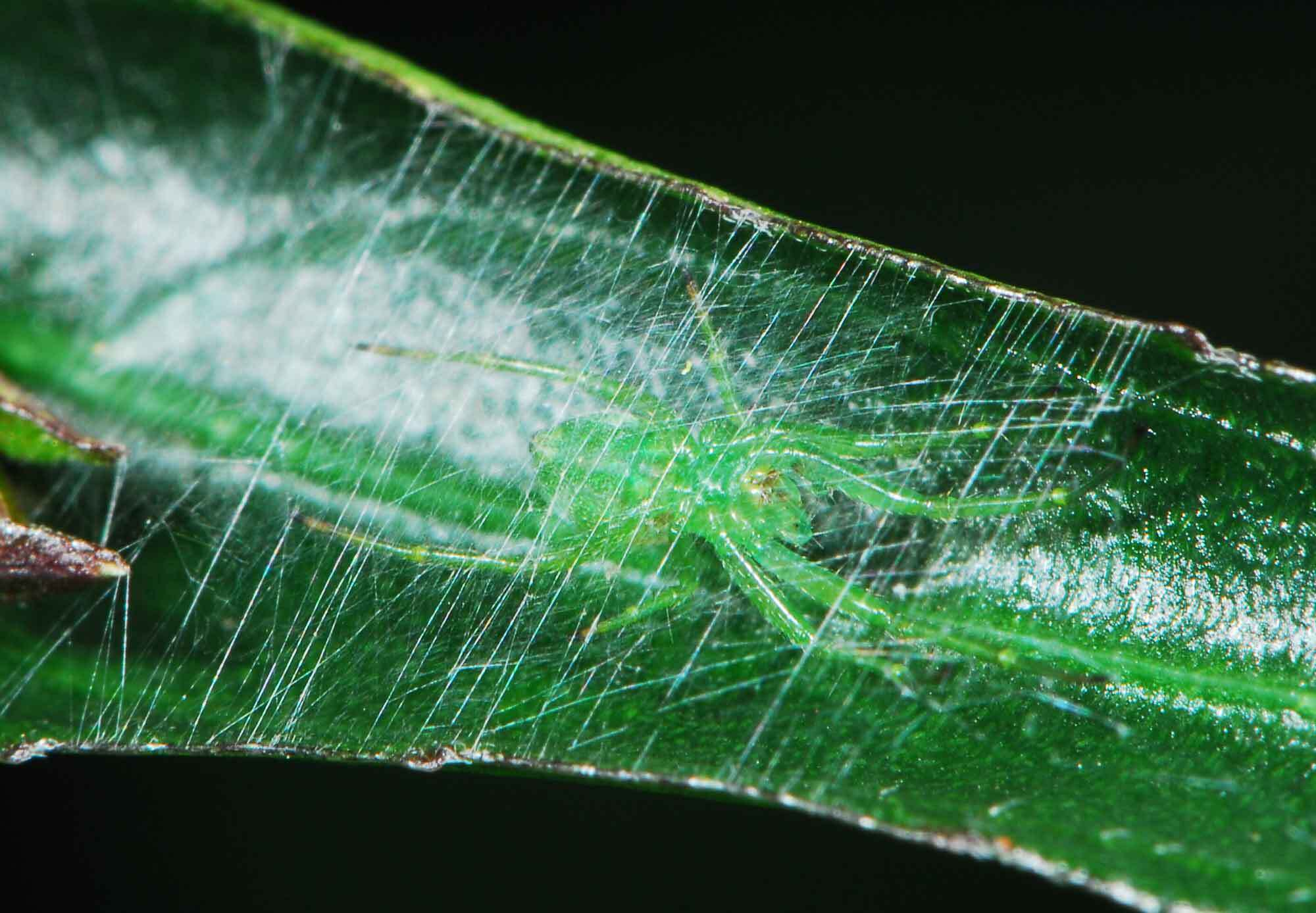
female in web

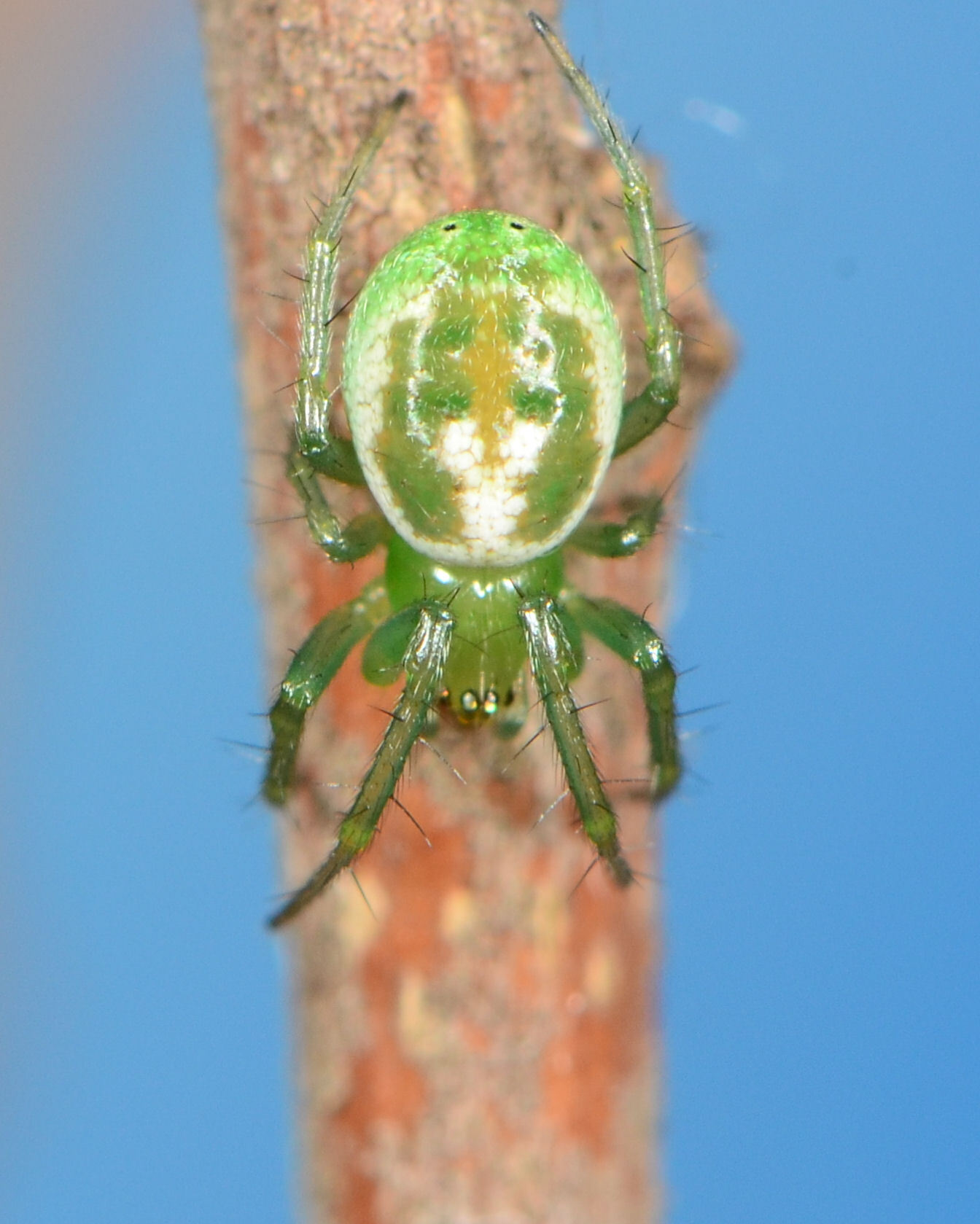
female

== Conservation ==
Prasonica seriata is listed as Least Concern by the South African National Biodiversity Institute due to its wide geographical range across Africa. The species is protected in 15 protected areas.

== Taxonomy ==
The species was originally described by Eugène Simon in 1895 from Sierra Leone. It was later revised by Grasshoff in 1971, who synonymized Spilasma africana with this species. The species is known from both sexes.
