= Prasonica plagiata =

Conservation status
- Data Deficient (NZ TCS)

Scientific classification
- Domain: Eukaryota
- Kingdom: Animalia
- Phylum: Arthropoda
- Subphylum: Chelicerata
- Class: Arachnida
- Order: Araneae
- Infraorder: Araneomorphae
- Family: Araneidae
- Genus: Prasonica
- Species: P. plagiata

Binomial name
- Prasonica plagiata (Dalmas, 1917)

Synonyms
- Lobetina plagiata

Species of spider

Prasonica plagiata is a species of Araneidae that is endemic to New Zealand.

== Taxonomy ==
This species was described as Lobetina plagiata in 1917 by Raymond Comte de Dalmas. The genus Lobetina was recognised as a synonym of Prasonica in 1971, so the species is now known by the name Prasonica plagiata.

== Description ==
The body is recorded at 5 mm (0.20 in) in length.

== Distribution ==
This species is endemic to New Zealand.

== Conservation status ==
Under the New Zealand Threat Classification System, this species is listed as "Data Deficient" with the qualifiers of "Data Poor: Size" and "Data Poor: Trend".
