= Hypodrassodes maoricus =

Conservation status
- Not Threatened (NZ TCS)

Scientific classification
- Domain: Eukaryota
- Kingdom: Animalia
- Phylum: Arthropoda
- Subphylum: Chelicerata
- Class: Arachnida
- Order: Araneae
- Infraorder: Araneomorphae
- Family: Gnaphosidae
- Genus: Hypodrassodes
- Species: H. maoricus

Binomial name
- Hypodrassodes maoricus (Dalmas, 1917)

Synonyms
- Drassodes maoricus

Species of spider

Hypodrassodes maoricus is a species of ground spider that is endemic to New Zealand.

== Taxonomy ==
This species was described as Drassodes maoricus by Raymond Comte de Dalmas in 1917 from female specimens. The holotype is stored in the National Museum of Natural History, France.

== Description ==
The female is recorded at 10.9mm in length whereas the male is 8.6mm.

== Distribution ==
This species is known from the North Island and South Island of New Zealand.

== Conservation status ==
Under the New Zealand Threat Classification System, this species is listed as "Not Threatened".
