= Pterotrichina elegans =

Scientific classification
- Domain: Eukaryota
- Kingdom: Animalia
- Phylum: Arthropoda
- Subphylum: Chelicerata
- Class: Arachnida
- Order: Araneae
- Infraorder: Araneomorphae
- Family: Gnaphosidae
- Genus: Pterotrichina
- Species: P. elegans

Binomial name
- Pterotrichina elegans Dalmas, 1921

Species of spider

Pterotrichina elegans is a species of spiders in the family Gnaphosidae. It was first described in 1921 by Dalmas. It is found in Algeria, Tunisia.
