= Hypodrassodes dalmasi =

Conservation status
- Not Threatened (NZ TCS)

Scientific classification
- Kingdom: Animalia
- Phylum: Arthropoda
- Subphylum: Chelicerata
- Class: Arachnida
- Order: Araneae
- Infraorder: Araneomorphae
- Family: Gnaphosidae
- Genus: Hypodrassodes
- Species: H. dalmasi

Binomial name
- Hypodrassodes dalmasi Forster, 1979

Species of spider

Hypodrassodes dalmasi is a species of ground spider that is endemic to New Zealand.

== Taxonomy ==
This species was described by Ray Forster in 1979 from female and male specimens. The holotype is stored in Otago Museum.

== Description ==
The female is recorded at 8.2mm in length whereas the male is 6.9mm. The colouration is typical for this genus.

== Distribution ==
This species is only known from the North Island of New Zealand.

== Conservation status ==
Under the New Zealand Threat Classification System, this species is listed as "Not Threatened".
