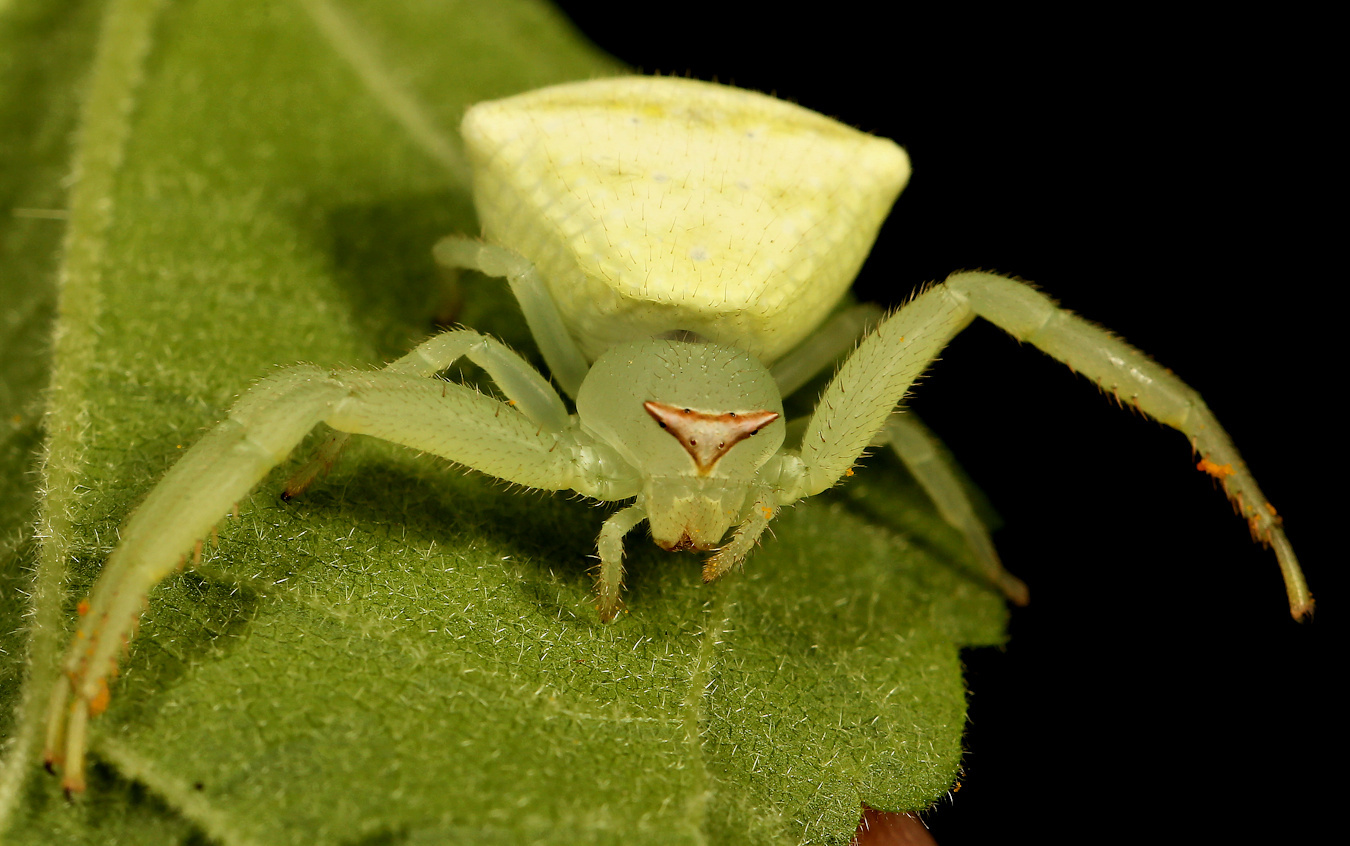
- female
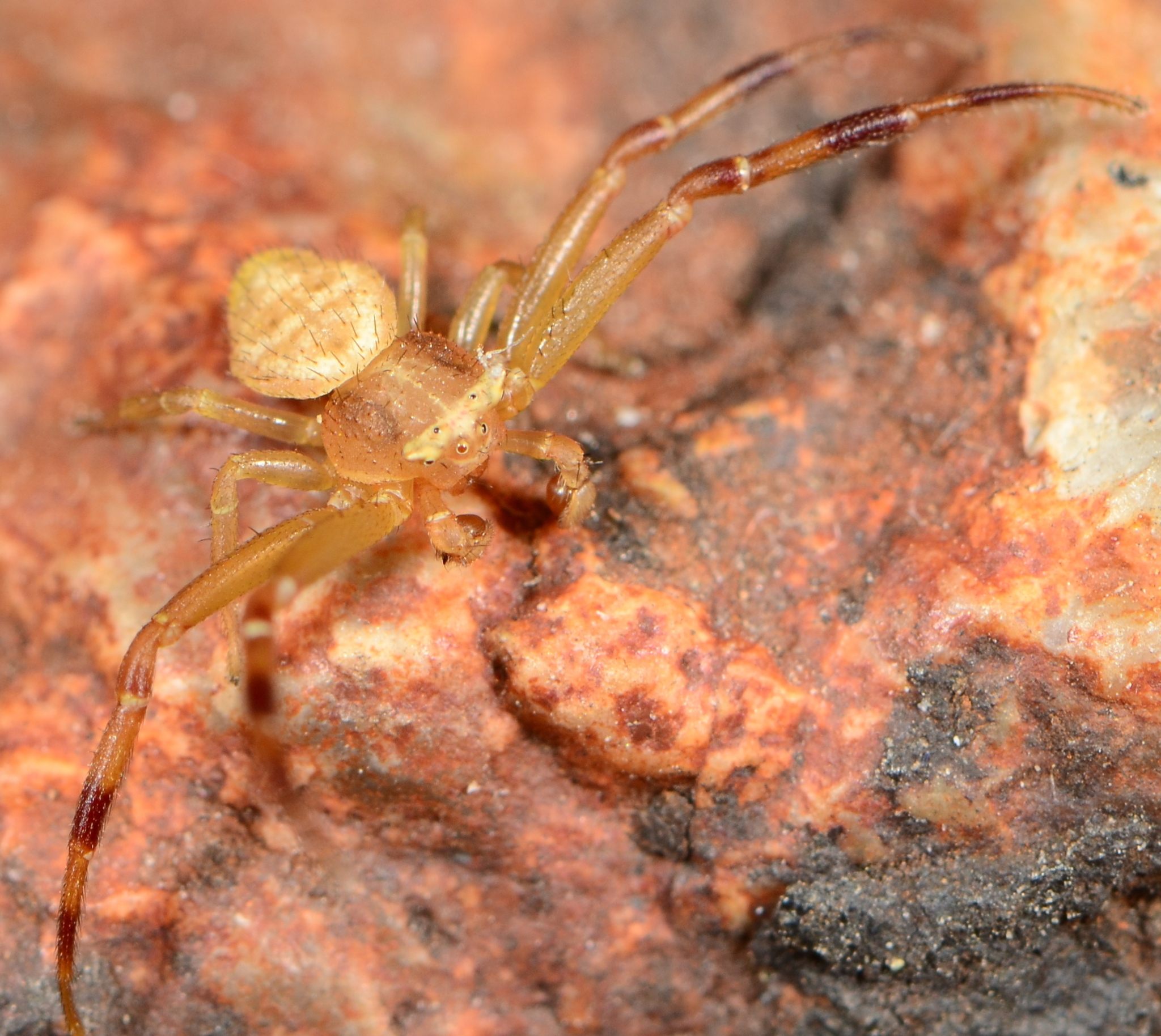
- male

Scientific classification
- Kingdom: Animalia
- Phylum: Arthropoda
- Subphylum: Chelicerata
- Class: Arachnida
- Order: Araneae
- Infraorder: Araneomorphae
- Family: Thomisidae
- Genus: Thomisus
- Species: T. dalmasi

Binomial name
- Thomisus dalmasi Lessert, 1919

Synonyms
- Thomisus dalmasoides Millot, 1942; Thomisus anthobioides Lawrence, 1942; Thomisus anthobioides mongbwalensis Comellini, 1957

= Thomisus dalmasi =

Dalmas's Thomisus crab spider

Species of crab spider

Thomisus dalmasi is a species of crab spider in the family Thomisidae. It is widely distributed across sub-Saharan Africa.

== Etymology ==
The species is named after Raymond Comte de Dalmas, a French arachnologist.

== Distribution ==
Thomisus dalmasi has been recorded from eight African countries: Guinea, Cameroon, Democratic Republic of the Congo, Rwanda, Tanzania, Malawi, Mozambique, and South Africa. In South Africa, the species is known from seven provinces and has been found in seven protected areas.

== Habitat ==
Thomisus dalmasi is found on plants across various biomes including Fynbos, forest, Indian Ocean Coastal Belt, grassland, and savanna. The species has also been recorded from agricultural crops such as lucerne and strawberries, at elevations ranging from 10 to 1,909 meters above sea level.

== Description ==
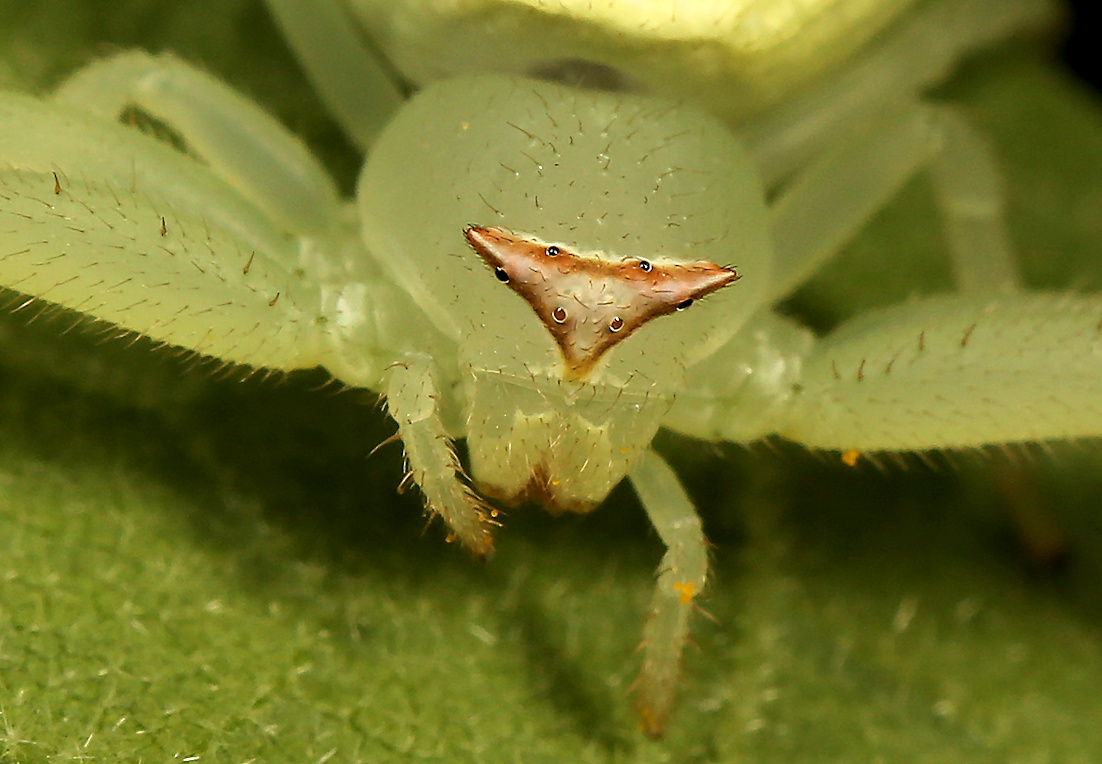
front view of female

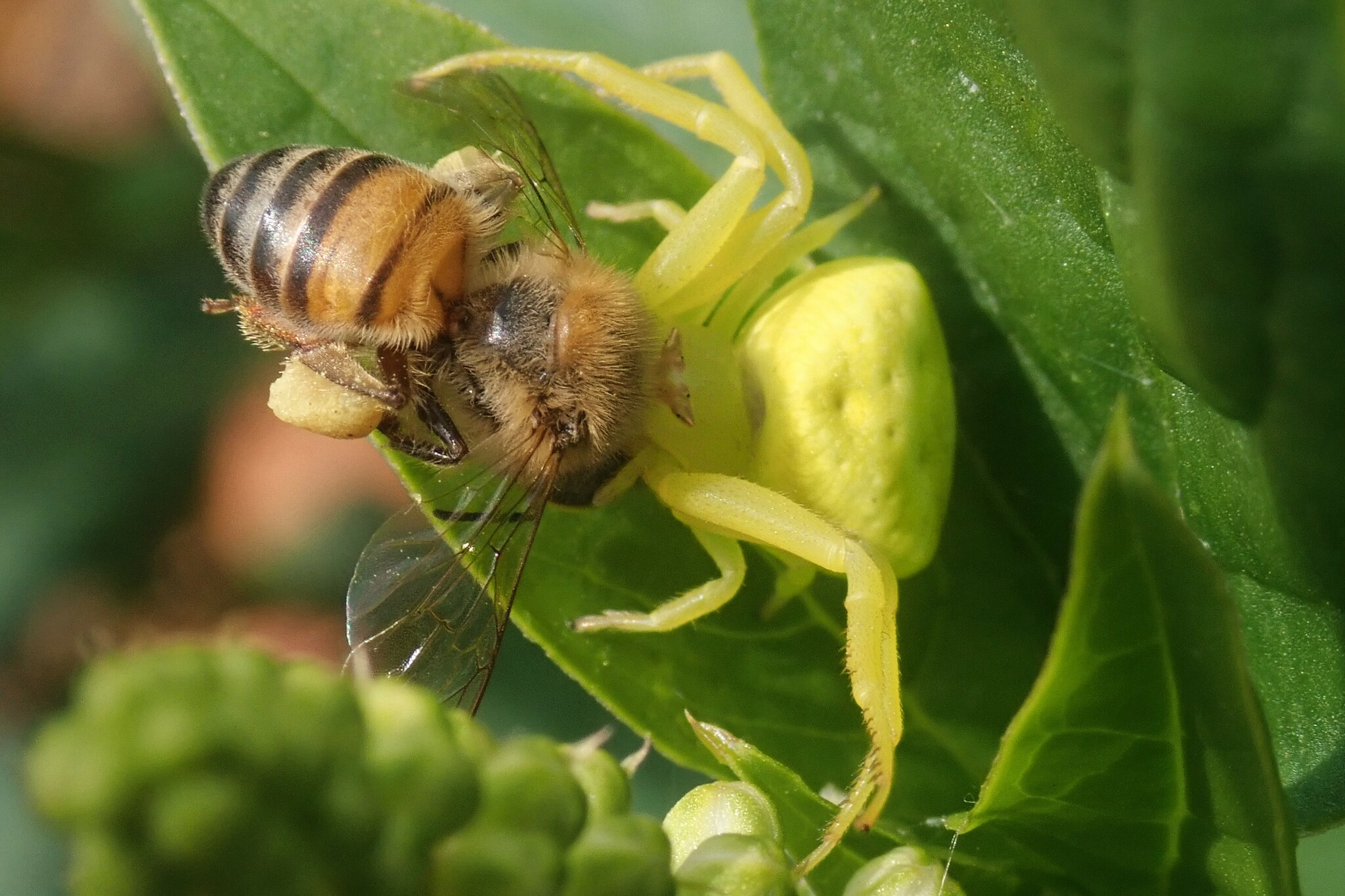
preying on bee

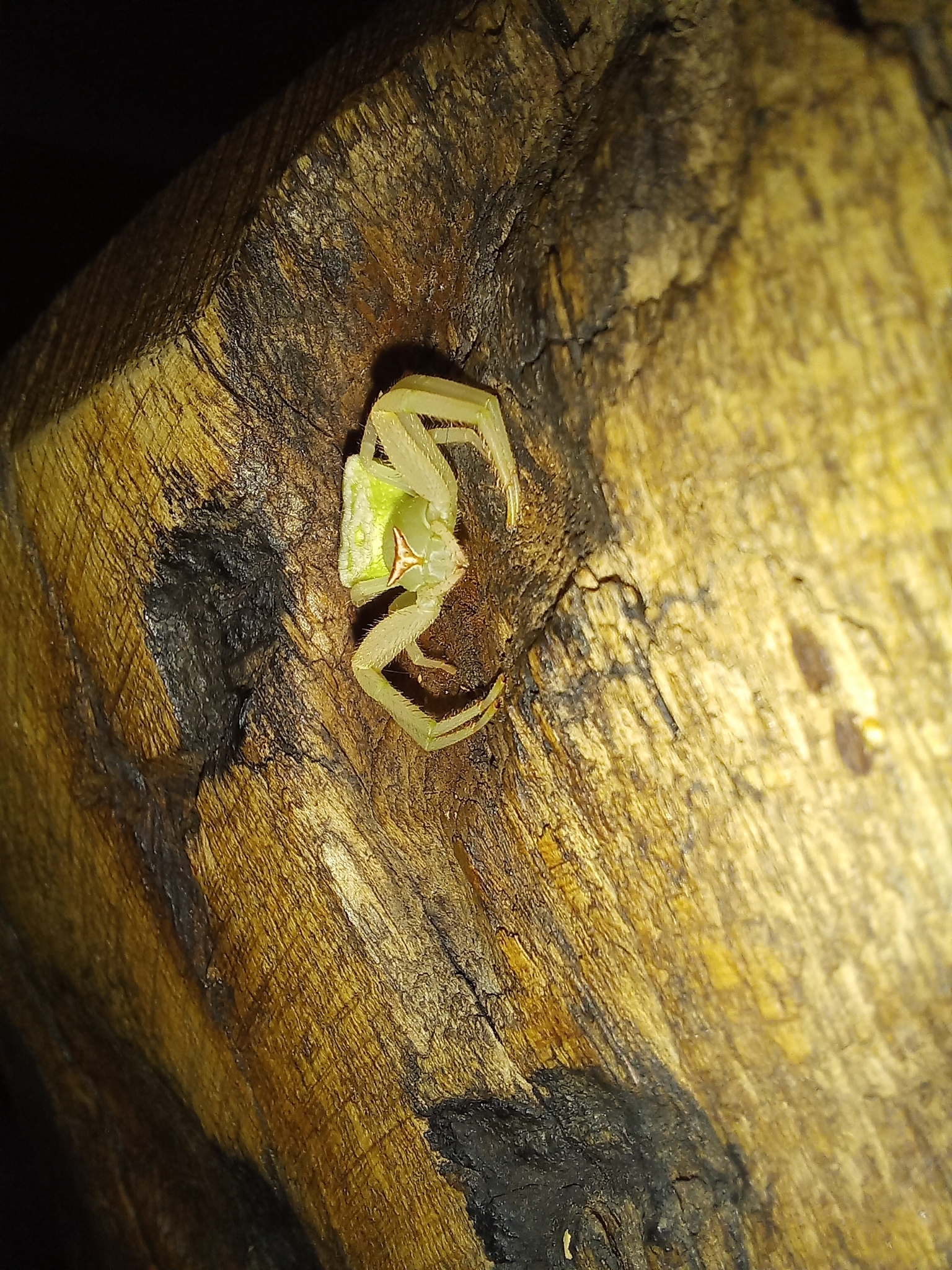
on trunk

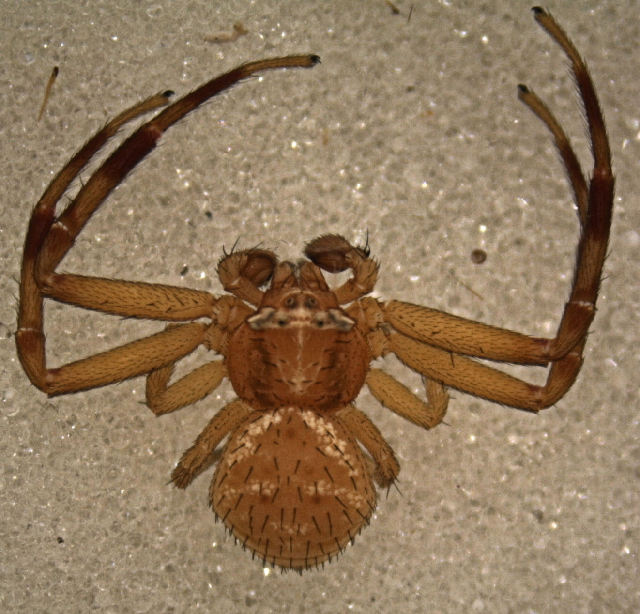
male

Thomisus dalmasi is a crab spider that exhibits the typical body plan of the family Thomisidae. Like other members of the genus Thomisus, it has a flattened cephalothorax and opisthosoma, with legs that can be held sideways in a crab-like manner.

Both males and females of the species are known, with the female typically being larger than the male, as is common in spiders. The species can be distinguished from other Thomisus species by specific characteristics of the male pedipalps and female epigyne, though detailed morphological descriptions require microscopic examination.

== Conservation status ==
Thomisus dalmasi is considered to be of Least Concern due to its wide geographical range across multiple African countries. The species has been recorded in several protected areas including Tembe Elephant Park, Lhuvhondo Nature Reserve, Verloren Vallei Nature Reserve, and Tswalu Kalahari Reserve, and no specific conservation threats have been identified.

== Taxonomy ==
The species was first described by Roger de Lessert in 1919 from specimens collected in Tanzania. Over time, several other species were described that were later found to be synonyms of T. dalmasi. In 1957, Comellini synonymized Thomisus dalmasoides with T. dalmasi. Later, Dippenaar-Schoeman (1983) conducted a comprehensive revision and synonymized Thomisus anthobioides and T. anthobioides mongbwalensis with T. dalmasi, establishing the current taxonomic understanding of the species.
