= Nomisia australis =

Scientific classification
- Kingdom: Animalia
- Phylum: Arthropoda
- Subphylum: Chelicerata
- Class: Arachnida
- Order: Araneae
- Infraorder: Araneomorphae
- Family: Gnaphosidae
- Genus: Nomisia
- Species: N. australis

Binomial name
- Nomisia australis Comte de Dalmas, 1921

Species of spider

Nomisia australis is a species of spider in the family Gnaphosidae. It is endemic to South Africa.

== Distribution ==
Nomisia australis has a very restricted distribution in South Africa's Western Cape province, with a small range. The species is known from Beaufort West and Pniel at an altitude of 741 m above sea level at the type locality.

== Habitat and ecology ==
The species is a free-living ground dweller found in the Nama Karoo biome.

== Conservation ==
Nomisia australis is listed as Data Deficient for taxonomic reasons. The species has a small range and too little is known about the location, distribution and threats for an assessment to be made. More sampling is needed to collect females and determine the species' actual range.

== Taxonomy ==
The species was described by Dalmas in 1921 from Beaufort West. It has not been revised since and is known only from the male.
