= South African Class 6E1, Series 6 =

Type of electric locomotive

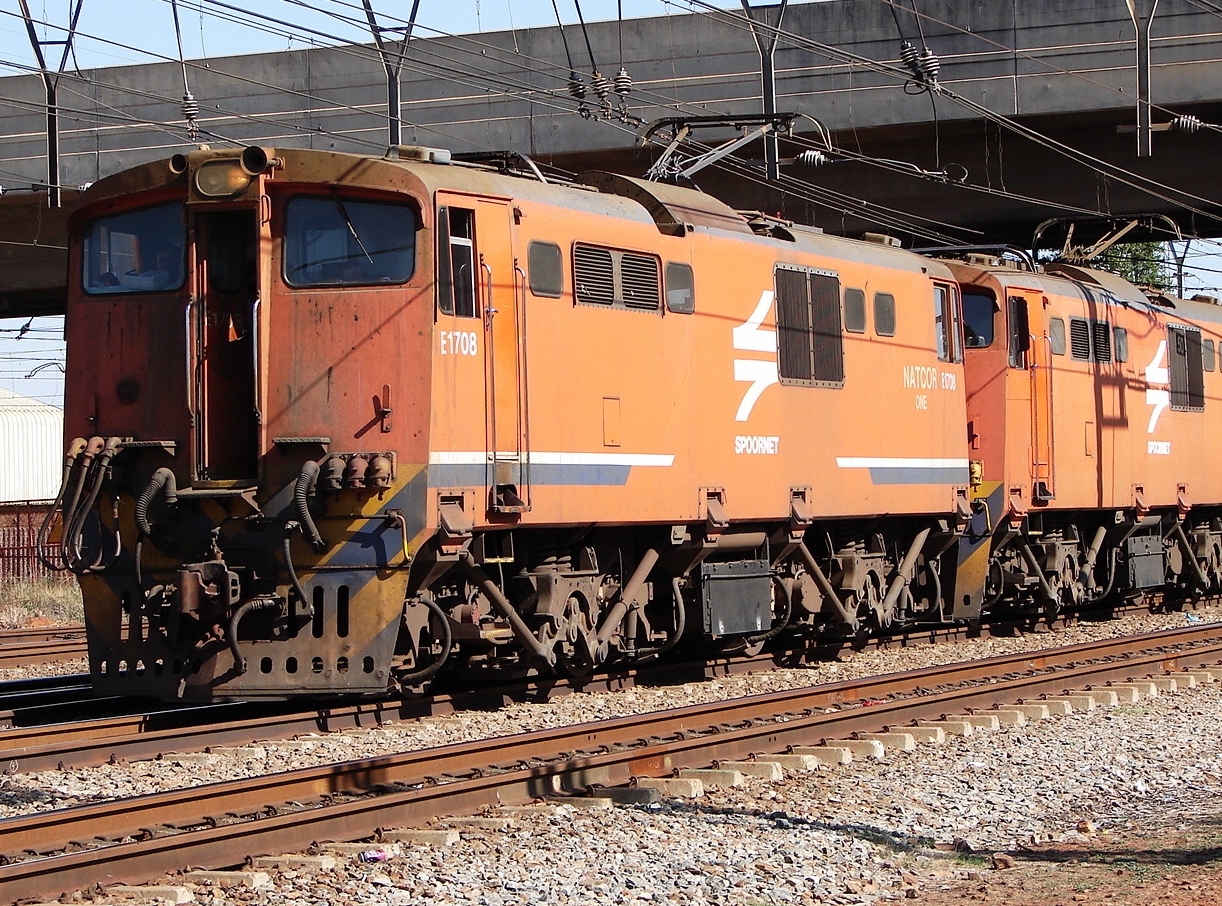
- E1708 at Kaalfontein, Gauteng in October 2009
Type and origin
- Power type: Electric
- Designer: Union Carriage & Wagon
- Builder: Union Carriage & Wagon
- Model: UCW 6E1
- Build date: 1976-1977
- Total produced: 100
- Rebuilder: Transnet Rail Engineering
- Rebuild date: 2003-2014
- Number rebuilt: 90 to Class 18E, Series 1 & 2
Specifications
- Configuration
  - AAR: B-B
  - UIC: Bo′Bo′
  - Commonwealth: Bo-Bo
- Gauge: 3 ft 6 in (1,067 mm) Cape gauge
- Wheel diameter: 1,220 mm (48.03 in)
- Wheelbase: 11,279 mm (37 ft 0 in)
  - Bogie: 3,430 mm (11 ft 3 in)
- Pivot centres: 7,849 mm (25 ft 9 in)
- Panto shoes: 6,972 mm (22 ft 10 1/2 in)
- Length
  - Over couplers: 15,494 mm (50 ft 10 in)
  - Over body: 14,631 mm (48 ft 0 in)
- Width: 2,896 mm (9 ft 6 in)
- Height
  - Pantograph: 4,089 mm (13 ft 5 in)
  - Body height: 3,937 mm (12 ft 11 in)
- Axle load: 22,226 kg (49,000 lb)
- Adhesive weight: 88,904 kg (196,000 lb)
- Loco weight: 88,904 kg (196,000 lb)
- Electric system/s: 3 kV DC catenary
- Current pickup(s): Pantographs
- Traction motors: Four AEI-283AY
  - Rating 1 hour: 623 kW (835 hp)
  - Continuous: 563 kW (755 hp)
- Gear ratio: 18:67
- Loco brake: Air & Regenerative
- Train brakes: Air & Vacuum
- Couplers: AAR knuckle
Performance figures
- Maximum speed: 113 km/h (70 mph)
- Power output
  - 1 hour: 2,492 kW (3,342 hp)
  - Continuous: 2,252 kW (3,020 hp)
- Tractive effort
  - Starting: 311 kN (70,000 lbf)
  - 1 hour: 221 kN (50,000 lbf)
  - Continuous: 193 kN (43,000 lbf) @ 40 km/h (25 mph)
Career
- Operators: South African Railways; Spoornet; Transnet Freight Rail; Passenger Rail Agency of South Africa
- Class: Class 6E1
- Number in class: 100
- Numbers: E1646-E1745
- Delivered: 1976-1977
- First run: 1976

The South African Railways Class 6E1, Series 6 of 1976 was an electric locomotive.

In 1976 and 1977, the South African Railways placed one hundred Class 6E1, Series 6 electric locomotives with a Bo-Bo wheel arrangement in mainline service.

== Manufacturer ==
The 3 kV DC Class 6E1, Series 6 electric locomotive was designed and built for the South African Railways (SAR) by Union Carriage & Wagon (UCW) in Nigel, Transvaal. The electrical equipment was supplied by GEC Traction's factories in Manchester and Sheffield UK, part of the General Electric Company (GEC).

One hundred units were delivered in 1976 and 1977, numbered in the range from E1646 to E1745. Unlike Series 1 to 5 units which were all equipped with four AEI-283AZ axle-hung traction motors, the Series 6 units were equipped with AEI-283AY traction motors. UCW did not allocate builder’s numbers to the locomotives it built for the SAR and used the SAR unit numbers for their record keeping.

== Characteristics ==
=== Orientation ===
These dual cab locomotives had a roof access ladder on one side only, just to the right of the cab access door. The roof access ladder end was marked as the no. 2 end. A corridor along the centre of the locomotive connected the cabs, which were identical apart from the fact that the handbrake was located in cab 2. A pantograph hook stick was stowed in a tube mounted below the lower edge of the locomotive body on the roof access ladder side. The locomotives had one square and two rectangular access panels along the lower half of the body on the roof access ladder side, and only one square access panel on the opposite side.

=== Series identifying features ===
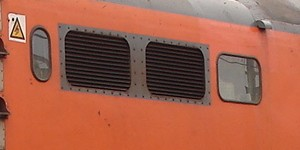
Grilles without beading on Series 5

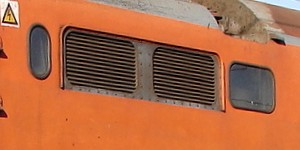
Grilles with beading on Series 6

The Class 6E1 was produced in eleven series over a period of nearly sixteen years. While some Class 6E1 series are visually indistinguishable from their predecessors or successors, some externally visible changes did occur over the years.

The Series 6 and Series 7 locomotives are visually indistinguishable from each other, but can be distinguished from all the older series models by the rainwater beading that had been added above the small grilles on the sides aft of the side doors.

== Service ==
The Class 6E1 family saw service all over both 3 kV DC mainline and branch line networks, the smaller Cape Western mainline between Cape Town and Beaufort West and the larger network which covers portions of the Northern Cape, the Free State, Natal, Gauteng, North West and Mpumalanga.

== Reclassification and rebuilding ==
=== Reclassification to Class 16E ===
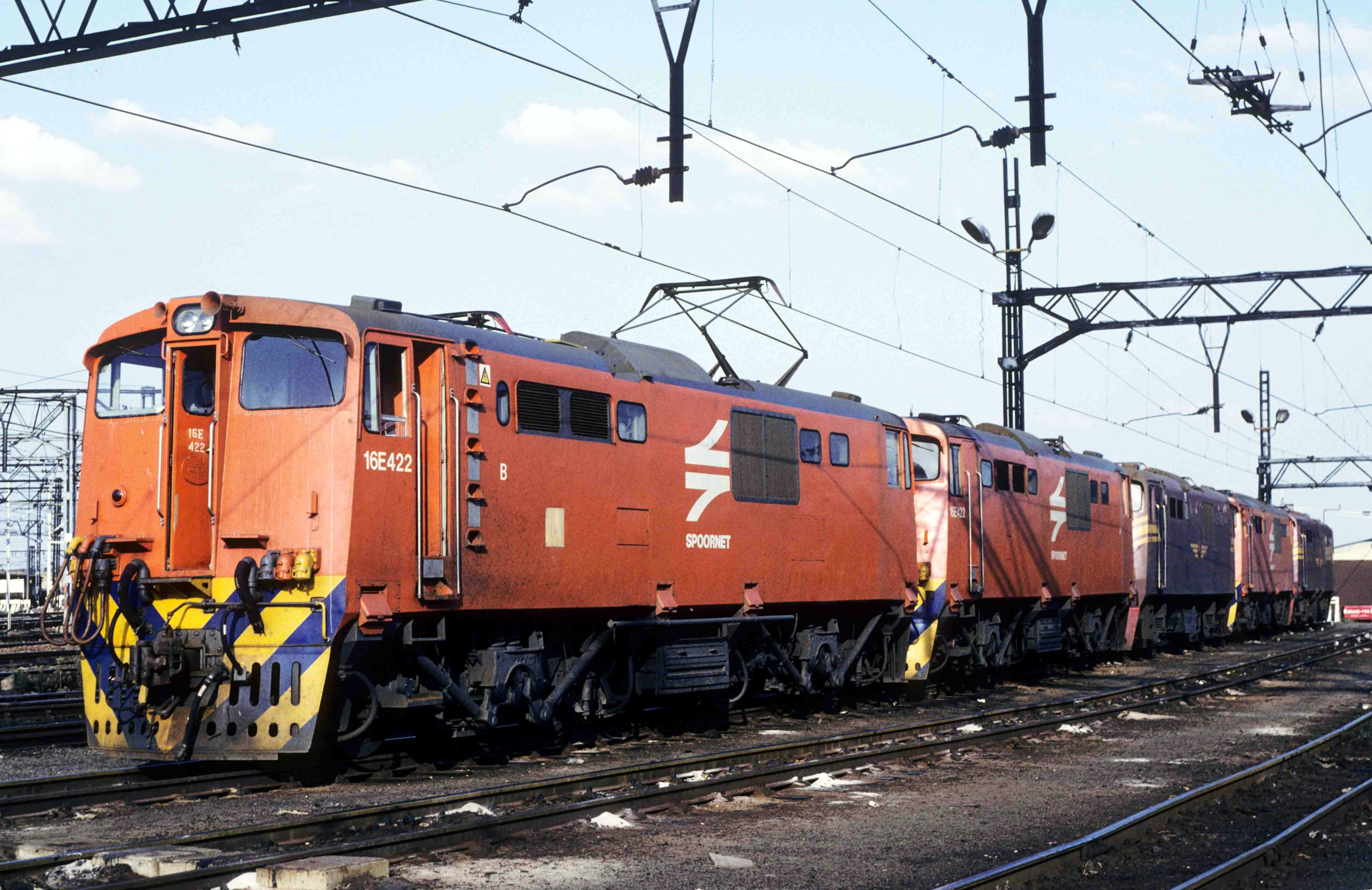
No. E1709 as Class 16E no. 16-422B, Germiston, 6 December 1991

During 1990 and 1991, Spoornet semi-permanently coupled several pairs of otherwise largely unmodified Class 6E1 units, reclassified them to Class 16E and allocated a single locomotive number to each pair, with the individual units in the pairs inscribed "A" or "B". The aim was to accomplish savings on cab maintenance by coupling the units at their no. 1 ends, abandoning the no. 1 end cabs in terms of maintenance and using only the no. 2 end cabs. Most pairs were later either disbanded with the units reverting to Class 6E1 and regaining their original numbers or rebuilt to Class 18E.

Eleven known Series 6 locomotives were part of such Class 16E pairs.

- E1653 became 16-420A.
- E1699 and E1700 became 16-425 A and B.
- E1669 and E1709 became 16-422 A and B.
- E1684 and E1701 became 16-427 A and B.
- E1718 and E1720 became 16-428 A and B.
- E1679 and E1714 became 16-429 A and B.

=== Rebuilding to Class 18E ===
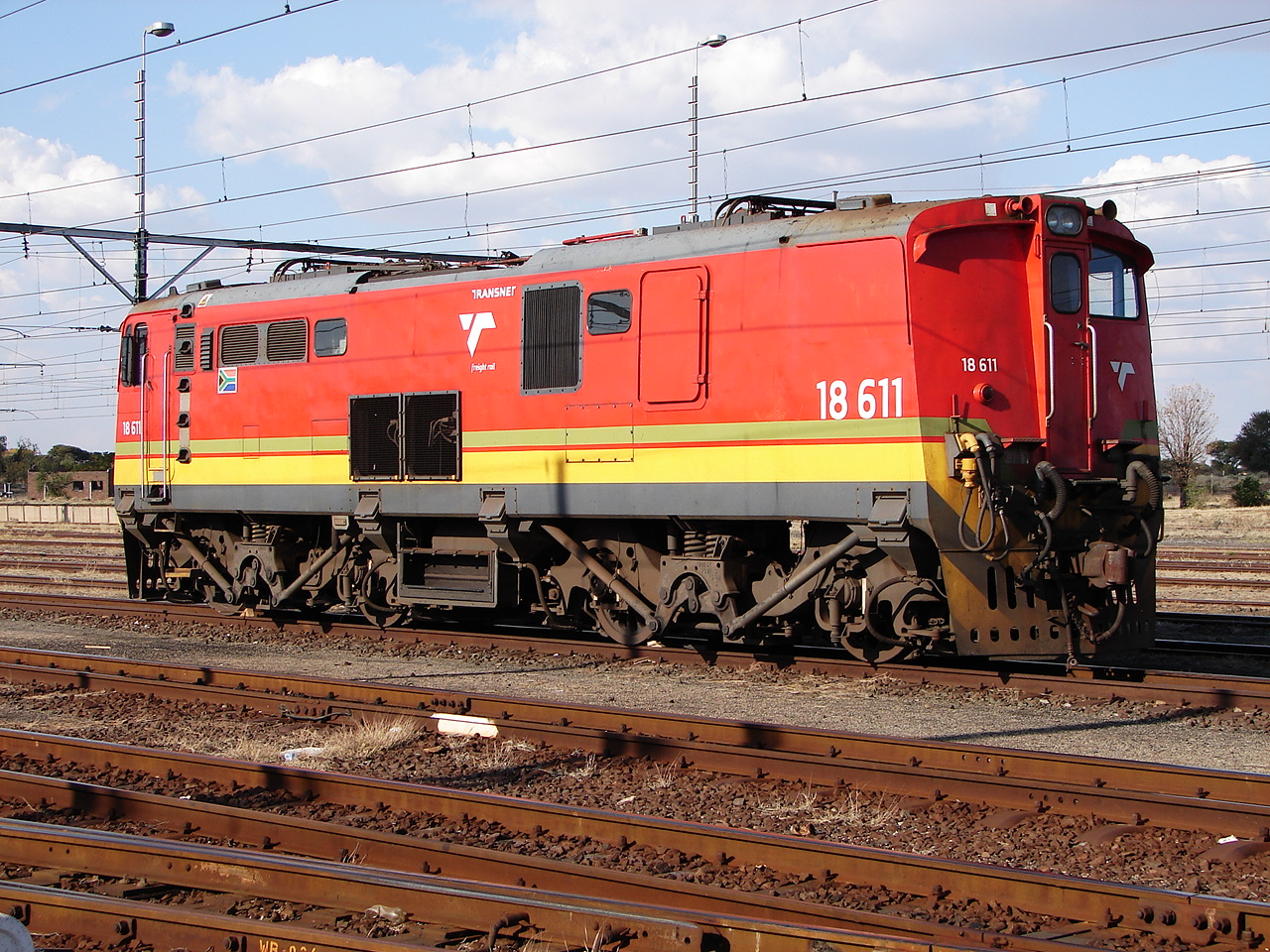
Cab 1 of Class 18E no. 18-611, ex Class 6E1 no. E1677, Warrenton, Northern Cape, 21 May 2013

Beginning in 2000, Spoornet began a project to rebuild Series 2 to 11 Class 6E1 locomotives to Class 18E, Series 1 and Series 2 at the Transnet Rail Engineering workshops at Koedoespoort. In the process the cab at the no. 1 end was stripped of all controls and the driver's front and side windows were blanked off to have a toilet installed, thereby forfeiting the locomotive's bi-directional ability.

Since the driving cab's noise level had to be below 85 decibels, cab 2 was selected as the Class 18E driving cab primarily based on its lower noise level compared to cab 1, which is closer and more exposed to the compressor's noise and vibration. Another factor was the closer proximity of cab 2 to the low voltage switch panel. The fact that the handbrake was located in cab 2 was not a deciding factor, but was considered an additional benefit.

The known Class 6E1, Series 6 units which were used in this project were rebuilt to Class 18E, Series 1 as well as Series 2 locomotives. Their numbers and renumbering details are listed in the table. This list is virtually complete with only one unknown remaining, the status of no. E1744 to 18-832 which is shown as “uncompleted” and of which the existence still need to be confirmed by sighting or photographic evidence. The Class 18E rebuilding program was terminated abruptly in late 2014 with about half a dozen units in various stages of completion on the rebuilding line. Some reports indicated that the incomplete units would be forwarded to Danskraal or Durban for completion, but it could not be confirmed that this actually took place.

Class 6E1, Series 6 units rebuilt to Class 18E as on 19 January 2015
Count	6E1 no.	Year built	18E no.	18E series	Year rebuilt	Notes
1	E1646	1976	18-142	1	2004	
2	E1647	1976	18-277	1	2006	
3	E1648	1976	18-506	1	2009	
4	E1649	1976	18-395	1	2008	
5	E1650	1976	18-504	1	2009	
6	E1651	1976	18-826	2	2014	
7	E1652	1976	18-209	1	2005	
8	E1653	1976	18-799	2	2014	c. 2014
9	E1655	1976	18-381	1	2008	
10	E1656	1976	18-190	1	2005	
11	E1660	1976	18-621	2	2010	
12	E1661	1976	18-648	2	2010	
13	E1662	1976	18-623	2	2010	
14	E1663	1976	18-667	2	2011	
15	E1664	1976	18-720	2	2012	
16	E1665	1976	18-373	1	2008	
17	E1668	1976	18-786	2	2014	c. 2014
18	E1669	1976	18-100	1	2003	ex 16-422A
19	E1670	1976	18-803	2	2014	c. 2014
20	E1671	1976	18-687	2	2011	
21	E1672	1976	18-630	2	2010	
22	E1673	1976	18-147	1	2004	
23	E1674	1976	18-632	2	2010	
24	E1675	1976	18-380	1	2008	
25	E1676	1976	18-635	2	2010	
26	E1677	1976	18-611	2	2010	
27	E1679	1976	18-349	1	2007	ex 16-429A
28	E1680	1976	18-614	2	2010	
29	E1681	1976	18-627	2	2010	
30	E1683	1976	18-351	1	2007	
31	E1684	1976	18-345	1	2007	ex 16-427A
32	E1685	1976	18-323	1	2007	
33	E1686	1976	18-104	1	2003	
34	E1687	1976	18-124	1	2004	
35	E1688	1976	18-768	2	2013	
36	E1689	1976	18-411	1	2009	
37	E1690	1976	18-297	1	2006	
38	E1691	1976	18-300	1	2006	
39	E1692	1976	18-375	1	2008	
40	E1693	1976	18-143	1	2004	
41	E1694	1976	18-287	1	2006	
42	E1695	1976	18-400	1	2008	
43	E1696	1976	18-313	1	2007	
44	E1697	1976-77	18-189	1	2005	
45	E1698	1976-77	18-372	1	2008	
46	E1699	1976-77	18-167	1	2004	ex 16-425A
47	E1700	1976-77	18-169	1	2004	ex 16-425B
48	E1701	1976-77	18-346	1	2007	ex 16-427B
49	E1702	1976-77	18-712	2	2012	
50	E1703	1976-77	18-600	2	2009	
51	E1704	1976-77	18-182	1	2005	
52	E1705	1976-77	18-386	1	2008	
53	E1706	1976-77	18-525	1	2009	
54	E1707	1976-77	18-508	1	2009	
55	E1708	1976-77	18-757	2	2013	
56	E1709	1976-77	18-503	1	2009	ex 16-422B
57	E1710	1976-77	18-144	1	2004	
58	E1711	1976-77	18-404	1	2008	PRASA
59	E1712	1976-77	18-394	1	2008	
60	E1713	1976-77	18-736	2	2013	
61	E1714	1976-77	18-350	1	2007	ex 16-429B
62	E1715	1977	18-602	2	2009	
63	E1716	1977	18-322	1	2007	
64	E1717	1977	18-628	2	2010	
65	E1718	1977	18-347	1	2007	ex 16-428A
66	E1719	1977	18-619	2	2010	
67	E1720	1977	18-348	1	2007	ex 16-428B
68	E1721	1977	18-357	1	2007	
69	E1722	1977	18-355	1	2007	
70	E1723	1977	18-644	2	2010	
71	E1724	1977	18-397	1	2008	
72	E1725	1977	18-517	1	2009	
73	E1726	1977	18-728	2	2013	
74	E1727	1977	18-622	2	2010	
75	E1728	1977	18-634	2	2010	
76	E1729	1977	18-629	2	2010	
77	E1730	1977	18-185	1	2005	
78	E1731	1977	18-519	1	2009	
79	E1732	1977	18-352	1	2007	
80	E1733	1977	18-690	2	2012	
81	E1734	1977	18-384	1	2008	
82	E1736	1977	18-645	2	2010	
83	E1737	1977	18-620	2	2010	
84	E1738	1977	18-405	1	2008	PRASA
85	E1739	1977	18-617	2	2010	
86	E1740	1977	18-388	1	2008	
87	E1741	1977	18-604	2	2009	
88	E1742	1977	18-163	1	2005	
89	E1743	1977	18-367	1	2007	
90	E1744	1977	18-832	2		Uncompleted
91	E1745	1977	18-518	1	2009	

== Liveries ==
The whole series was delivered in the SAR Gulf Red livery with signal red cowcatchers, yellow whiskers and with the number plates on the sides mounted on three-stripe yellow wings. In the 1990s many of the Series 6 units began to be repainted in the Spoornet orange livery with a yellow and blue chevron pattern on the cowcatchers. Several later received the Spoornet maroon livery. In the Passenger Rail Agency of South Africa (PRASA) era after 2008, at least three were repainted in the Shosholoza Meyl purple livery and one in the PRASA light blue livery.

== Illustration ==
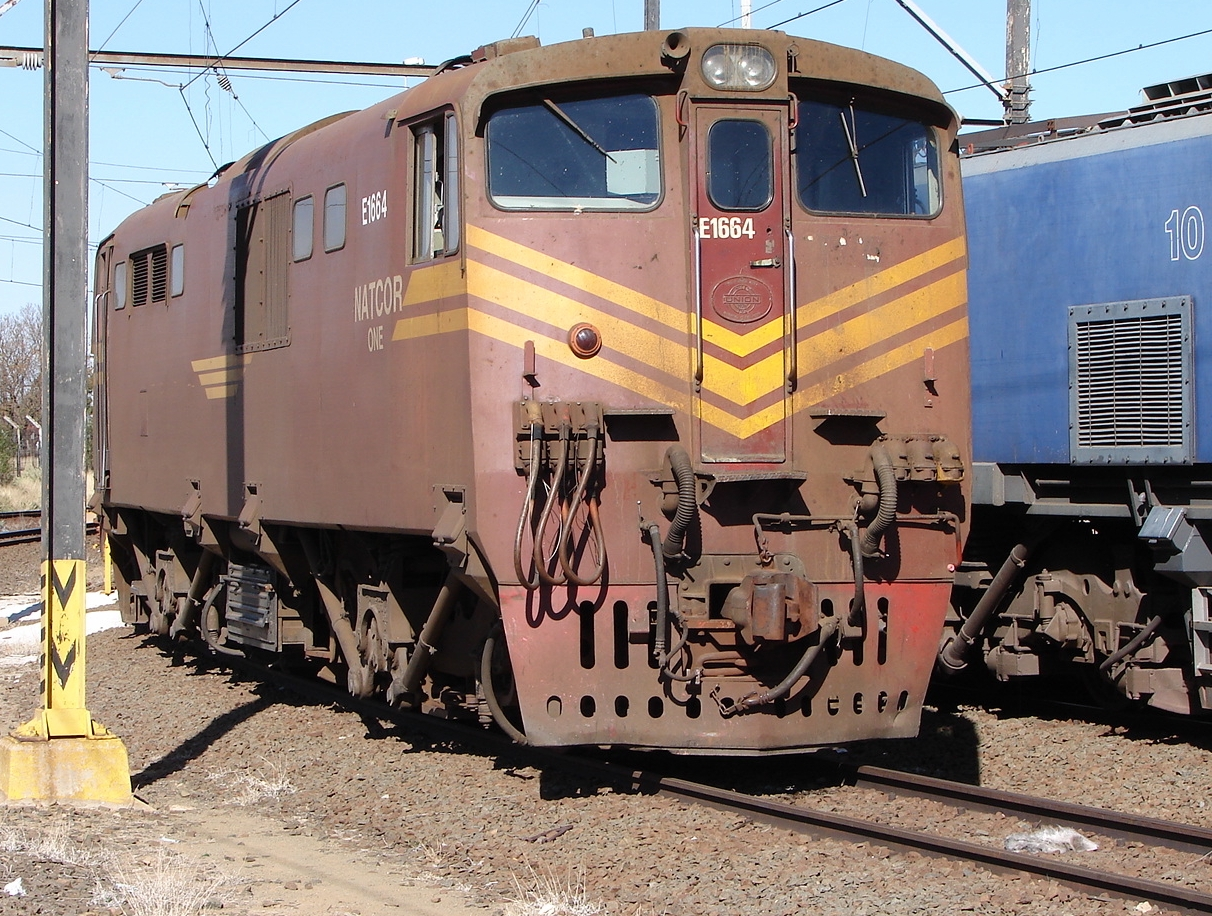
No. E1664 in SAR Gulf Red & whiskers at Beaconsfield, 17 September 2009

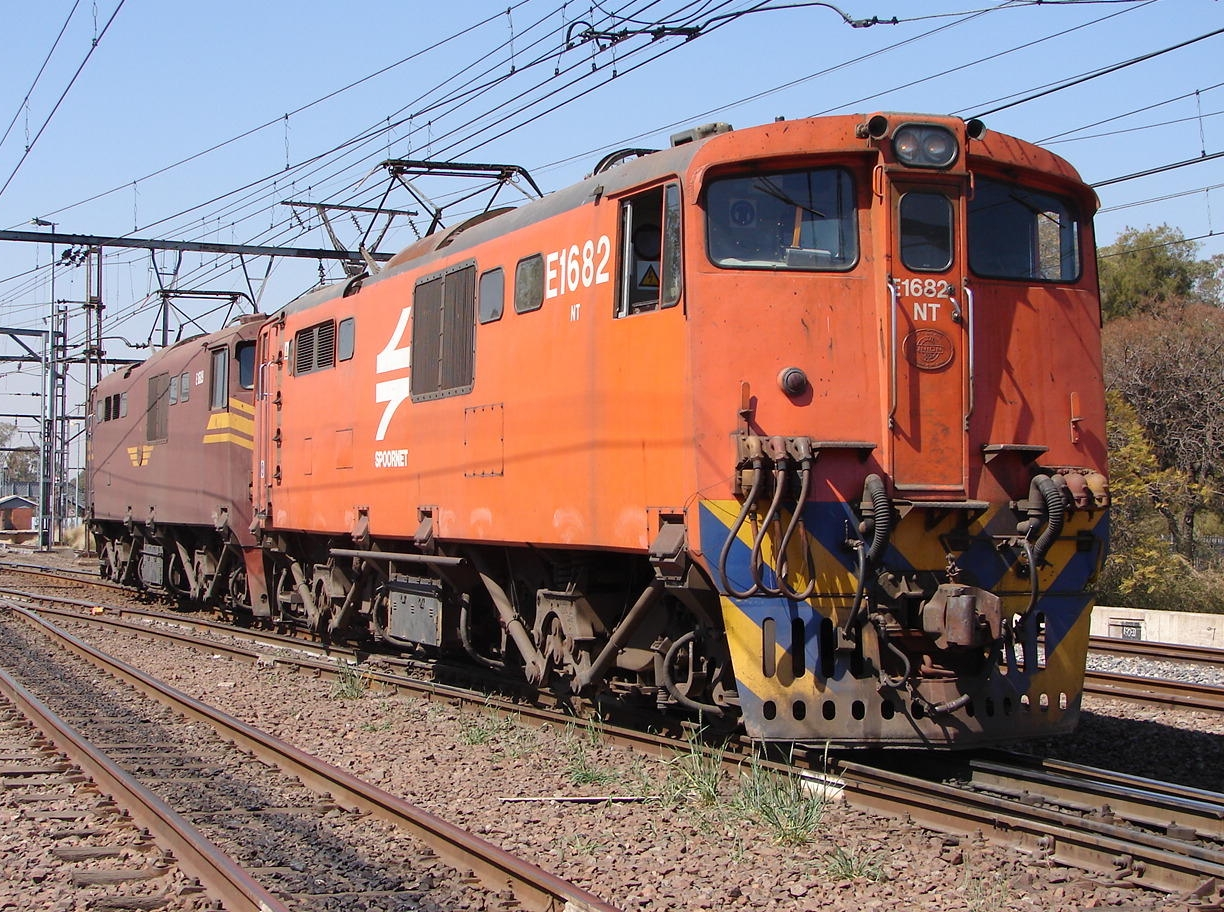
No. E1682 in Spoornet orange at Capital Park, Pretoria, 20 August 2007
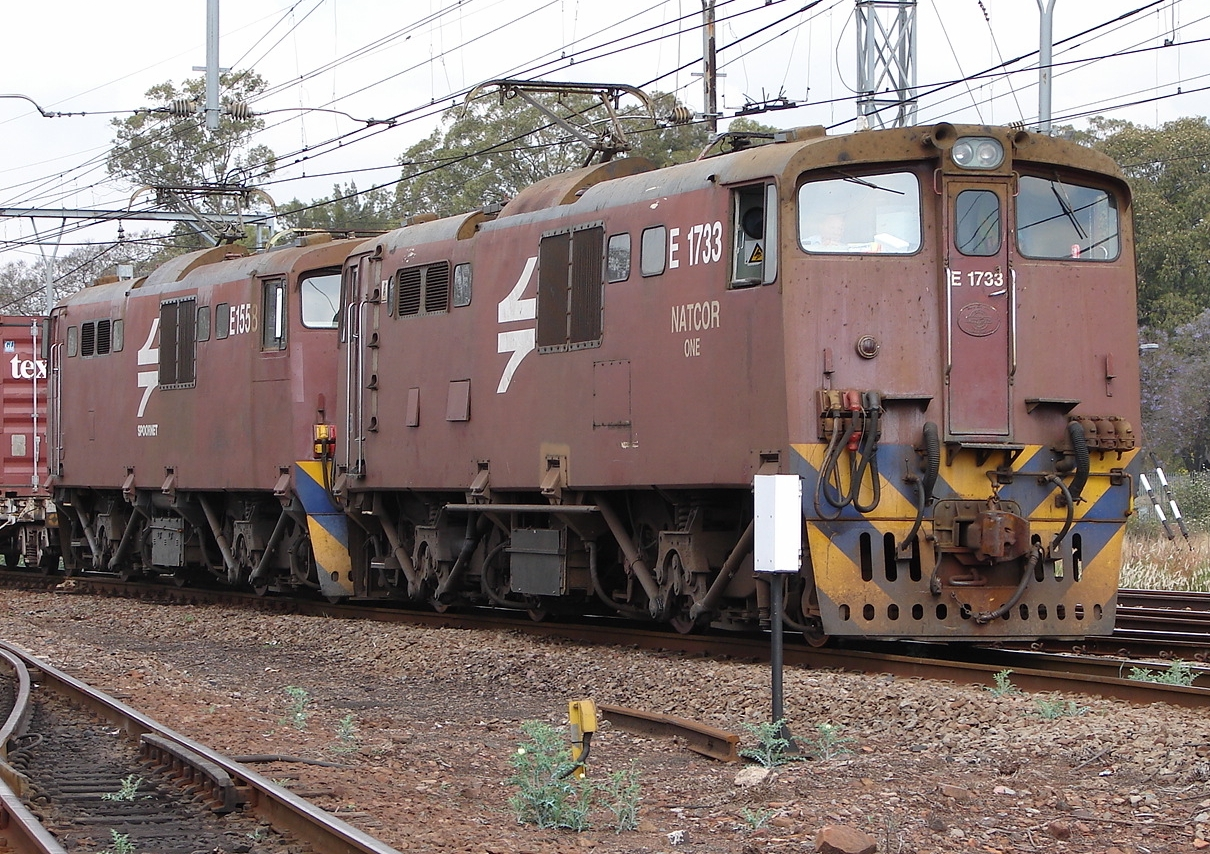
No. E1733 in Spoornet's maroon livery at Capital Park, Pretoria, 5 October 2009

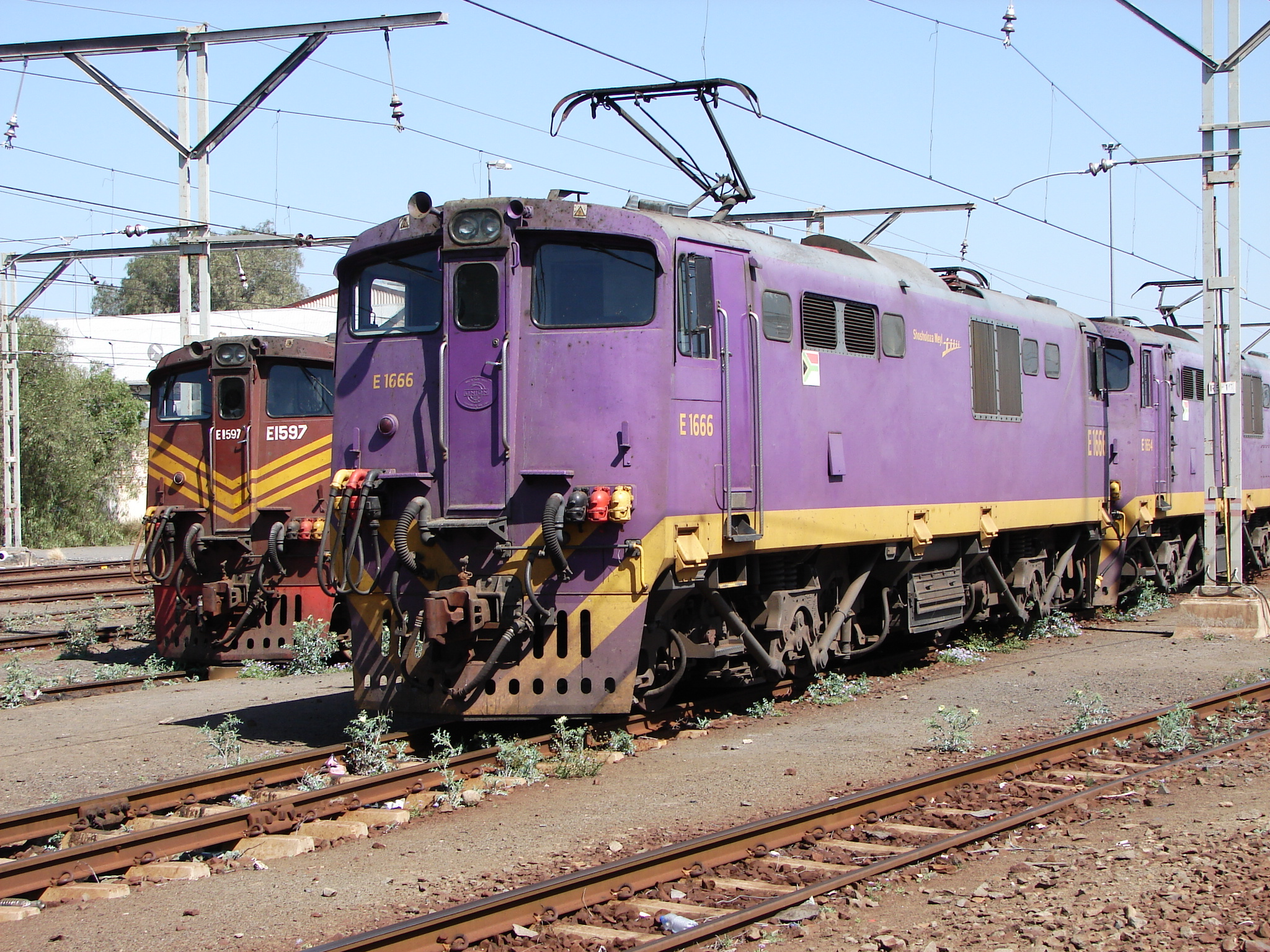
No. E1666 in PRASA's Shosholoza Meyl livery, Beaufort West, 15 September 2015

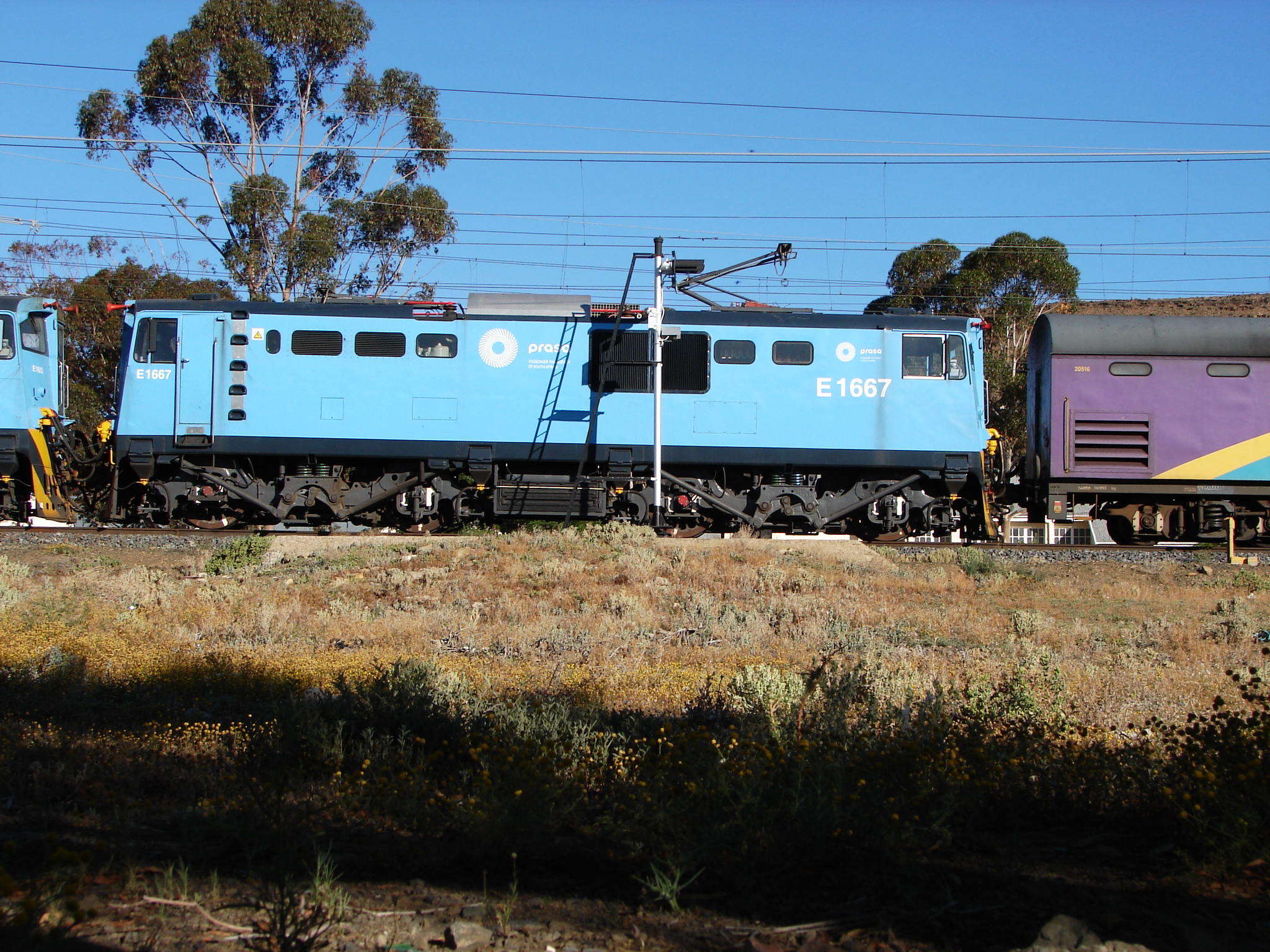
No. E1667 in PRASA's backdrop blue livery at Laingsburg, 11 October 2015
