= Fanie Louw =

South African rugby union player

- Born: Stephanus Cornelius Louw; 16 September 1909 Paarl, Cape Colony
- Died: 13 July 1940 (aged 30) Johannesburg, South Africa
- Height: 1.83 m (6 ft 0 in)
- Weight: 89 kg (196 lb)
- School: Paarl Boys' High School
- Notable relative: Boy Louw (brother)

Rugby union career
- Position: Prop
Amateur team(s)
Years	Team	Apps	(Points)
- Paarl RC
Provincial / State sides
Years	Team	Apps	(Points)
1928–33	Western Province		
1934–40	Transvaal		
International career
Years	Team	Apps	(Points)
1933–38	South Africa	12	(6)

Stephanus Cornelius "Fanie" Louw (16 September 1909 – 13 July 1940) was a South African rugby union player.

== Playing career ==
Louw was born in Paarl, received his schooling at Paarl Boys' High and in 1927 he started playing rugby at the Paarl RC. He made his provincial debut for Western Province in 1928 and played for the union until 1933, after which he moved to the Transvaal.

Louw made his debut for the Springboks in 1933 against the touring Australian team. In 1937 he toured with the Springboks to Australia and New Zealand and in 1938 he played in all three test matches against the touring team from the British Isles. He also played 18 tour matches and scored six tries for the Springboks.

Louw died on 13 July 1940 at Ellis Park, at the age of thirty, shortly after he captained Transvaal to a victory over the Western Province. He died of a heart attack caused by him being born with a malformed aorta.

=== Test history ===
No.	Opponents	Results (SA 1st)	Position	Tries	Dates	Venue
1.	Australia	17–3	Prop		8 Jul 1933	Newlands, Cape Town
2.	Australia	6–21	Flank		22 Jul 1933	Kingsmead, Durban
3.	Australia	12–3	Prop		12 Aug 1933	Ellis Park, Johannesburg
4.	Australia	11–0	Prop	1	26 Aug 1933	Crusaders Ground, Port Elizabeth
5.	Australia	4–15	Prop		2 Sep 1933	Springbok Park, Bloemfontein
6.	Australia	9–5	Prop		26 Jun 1937	Sydney Cricket Ground, Sydney
7.	New Zealand	7–13	Prop		14 Aug 1937	Athletic Park, Wellington
8.	New Zealand	13–6	Prop		4 Sep 1937	Lancaster Park, Christchurch
9.	New Zealand	17–6	Prop		25 Sep 1937	Eden Park, Auckland
10.	(United Kingdom) British Isles	26–12	Prop	1	6 Aug 1938	Ellis Park, Johannesburg
11.	(United Kingdom) British Isles	19–3	Prop		3 Sep 1938	Crusaders Ground, Port Elizabeth
12.	(United Kingdom) British Isles	16–21	Prop		10 Sep 1938	Newlands, Cape Town

== See also ==
- List of South Africa national rugby union players – Springbok no. 222
