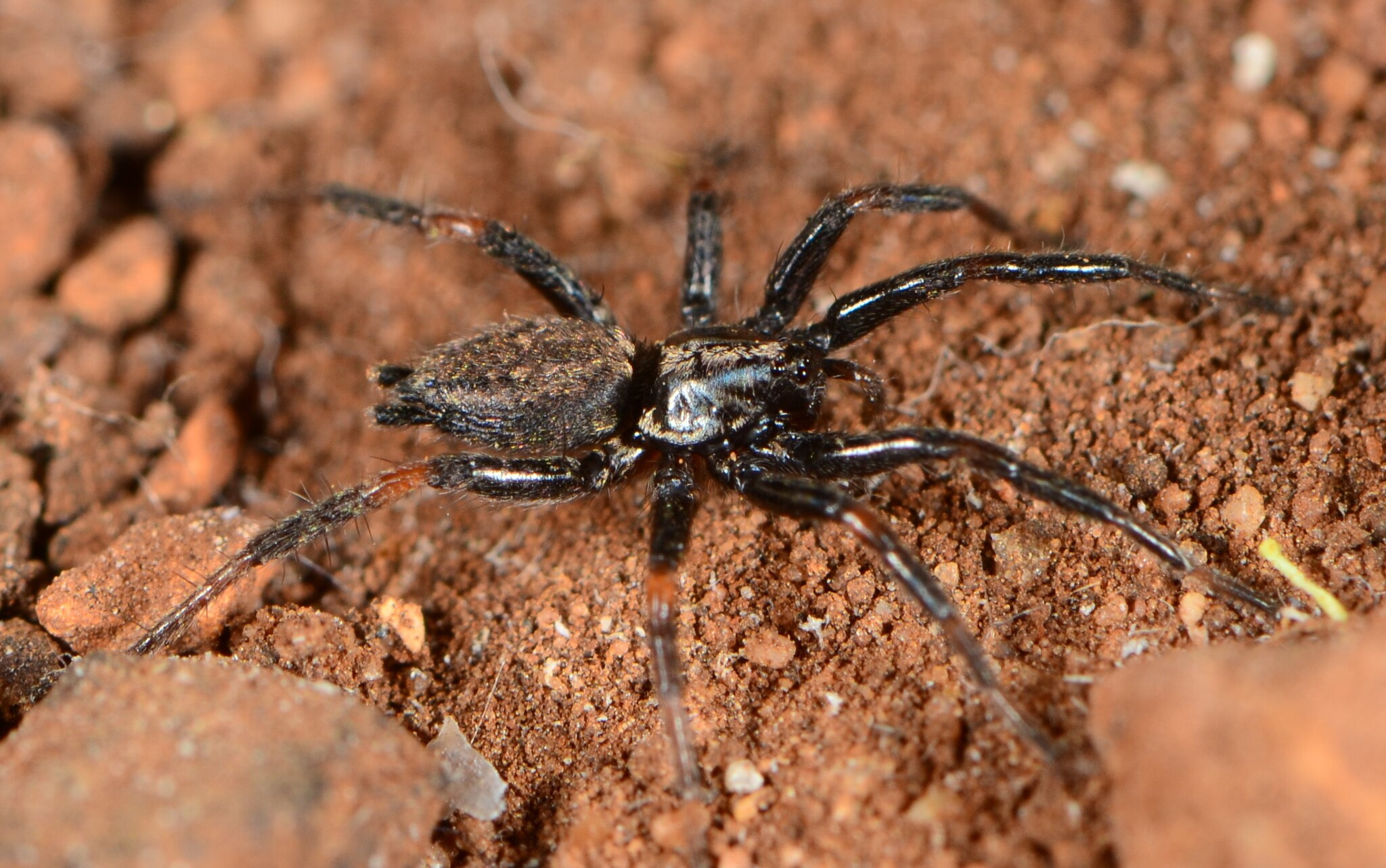
- female
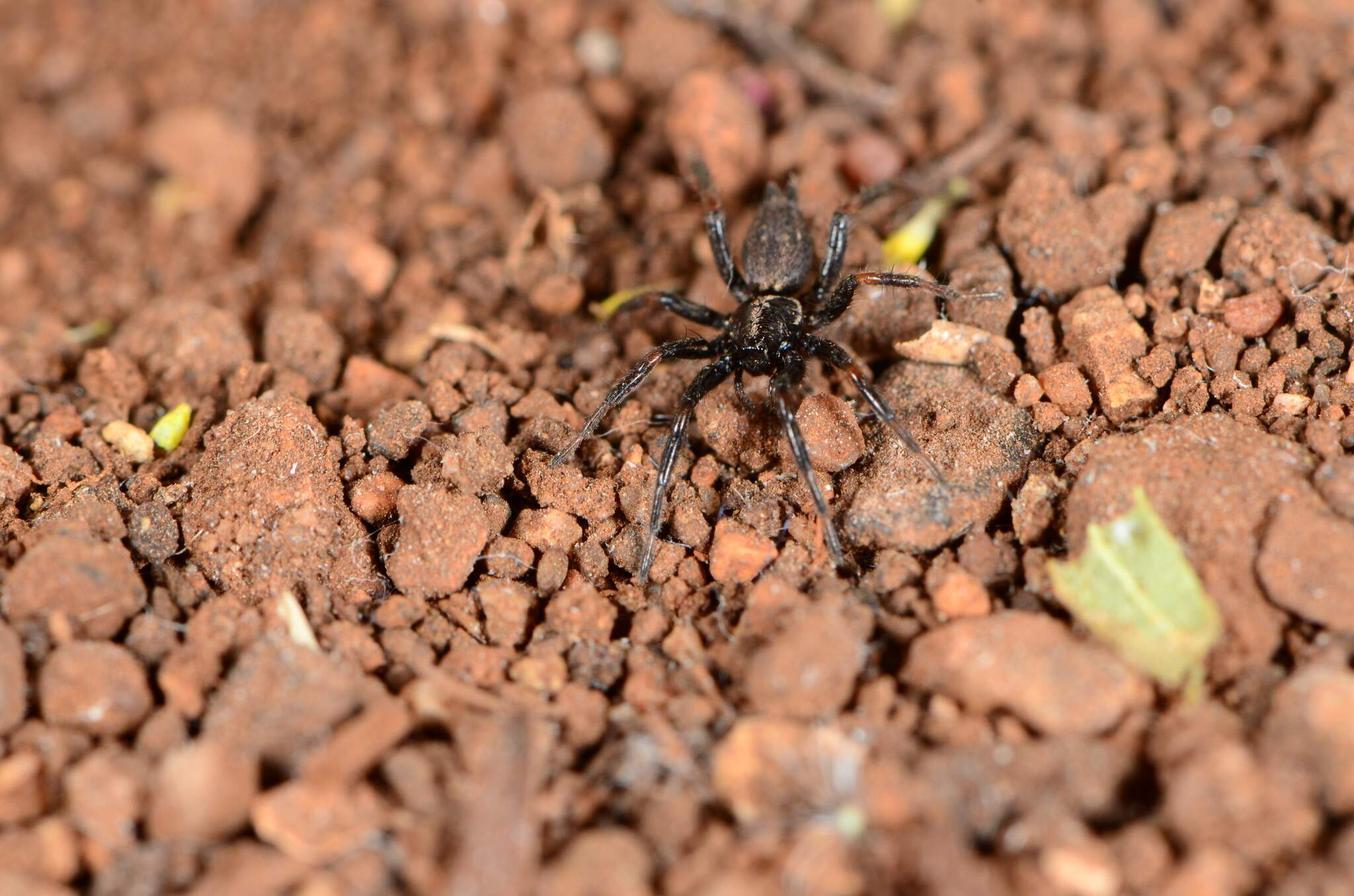
- female

Scientific classification
- Kingdom: Animalia
- Phylum: Arthropoda
- Subphylum: Chelicerata
- Class: Arachnida
- Order: Araneae
- Infraorder: Araneomorphae
- Family: Gnaphosidae
- Genus: Nomisia
- Species: N. transvaalica

Binomial name
- Nomisia transvaalica Comte de Dalmas, 1921

= Nomisia transvaalica =

Pretoria Nomisia Ground Spider

Species of spider

Nomisia transvaalica is a species of spider in the family Gnaphosidae. It is endemic to South Africa and is commonly known as the Pretoria Nomisia ground spider.

== Distribution ==
Nomisia transvaalica has a relatively wide distribution in South Africa, occurring in Gauteng and Mpumalanga provinces.

== Habitat and ecology ==
The species is a free-living ground dweller found in Grassland and Savanna biomes at altitudes ranging from 409 to 1,909 m above sea level.

== Conservation ==
Nomisia transvaalica is listed as Least Concern due to its wide geographic range across Gauteng and Mpumalanga. The species is protected in Klipriviersberg Nature Reserve, Kruger National Park, and Verloren Vallei Nature Reserve.

== Taxonomy ==
The species was described by Dalmas in 1921 from Pretoria. It has not been revised since and is known only from the female.
