= Beaufort West mine =

Uranium mine in Western Cape, South Africa

- Location within South Africa

Location
- Location: Western Cape, South Africa; 32°21′0″S 22°34′59.99″E

Production
- Products: uranium

The Beaufort West mine is a large mine located near Beaufort West in the northern part of the Western Cape, South Africa. Beaufort West represents one of the largest uranium reserves in South Africa having estimated reserves of 23 million tonnes of ore grading 0.08% uranium.
