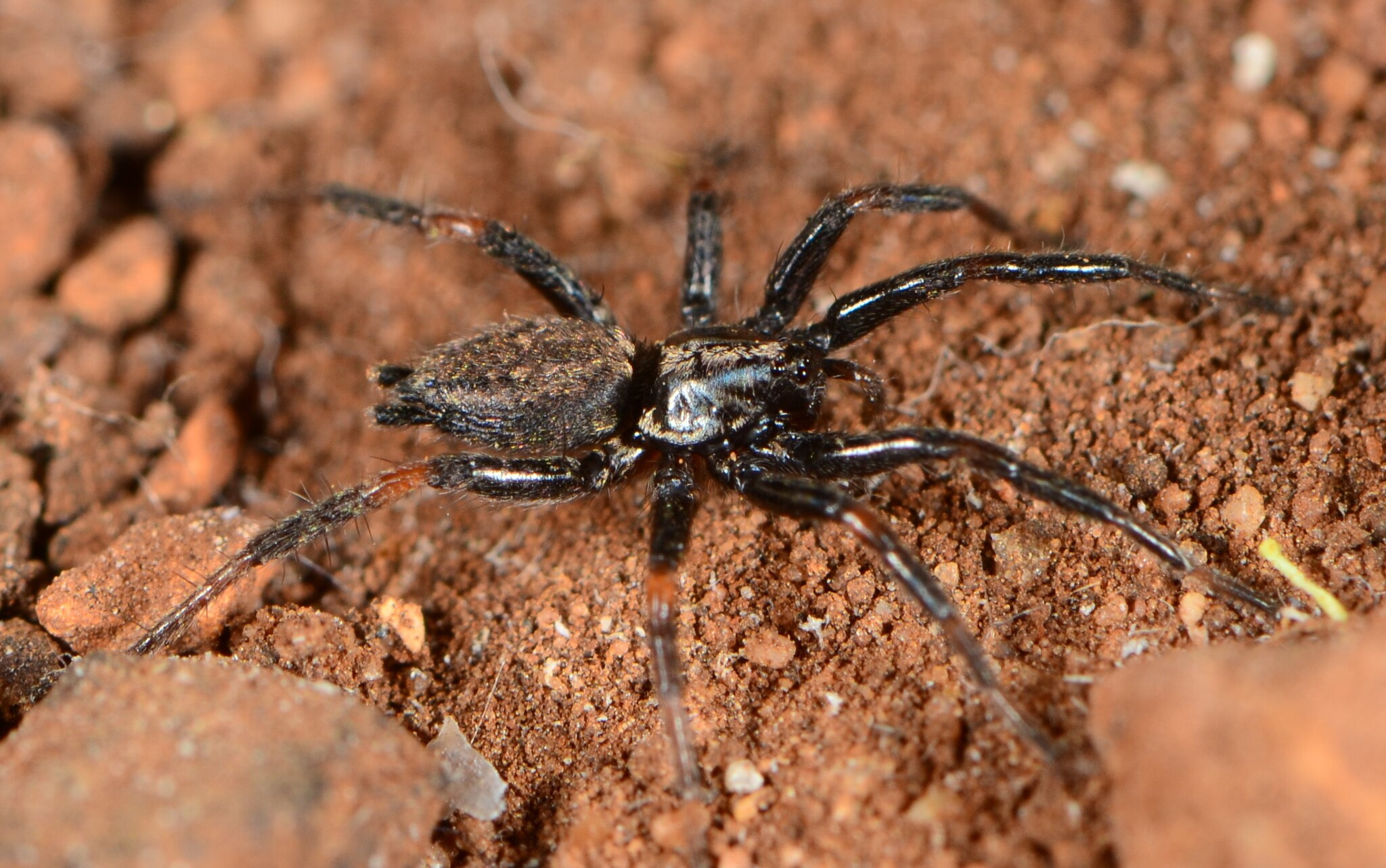
- female N. transvaalica
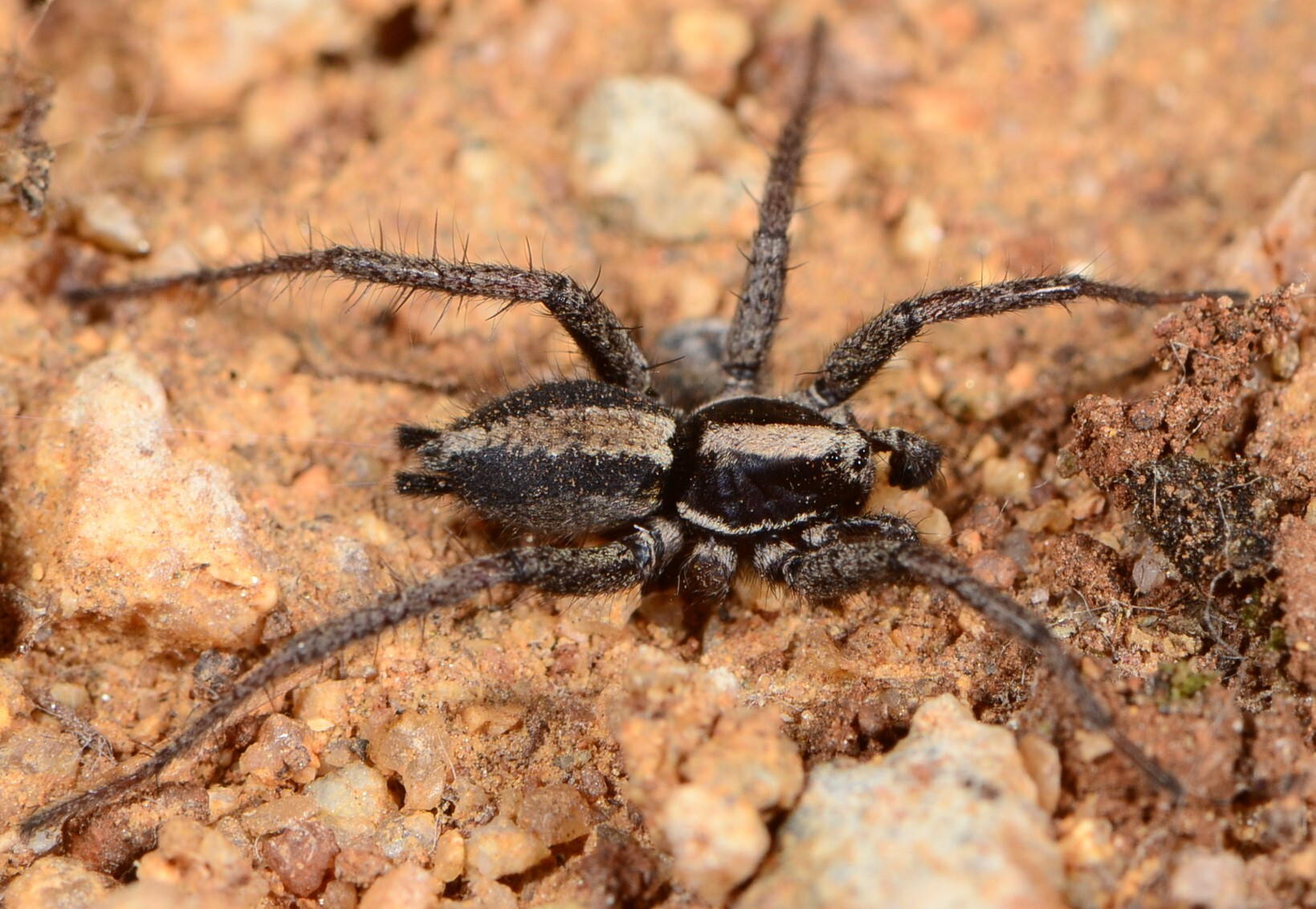
- male N. varia

Scientific classification
- Kingdom: Animalia
- Phylum: Arthropoda
- Subphylum: Chelicerata
- Class: Arachnida
- Order: Araneae
- Infraorder: Araneomorphae
- Family: Gnaphosidae
- Genus: Nomisia; Dalmas, 1921

Type species
- N. exornata (C. L. Koch, 1839)

Species
- 40, see text

= Nomisia =

Genus of spiders

Nomisia is a genus of ground spiders that was first described by R. de Dalmas in 1921.

== Species ==
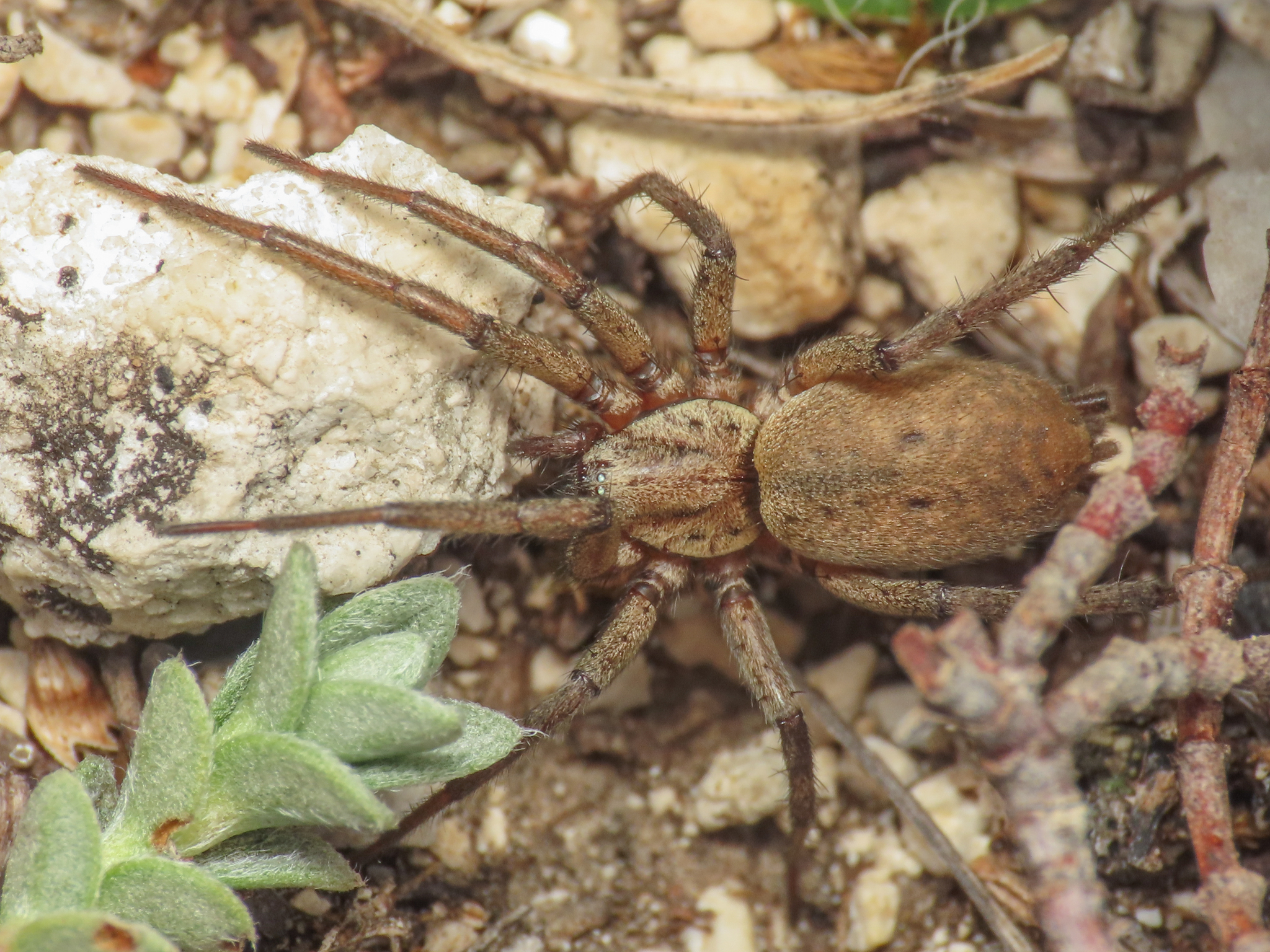
N. aussereri

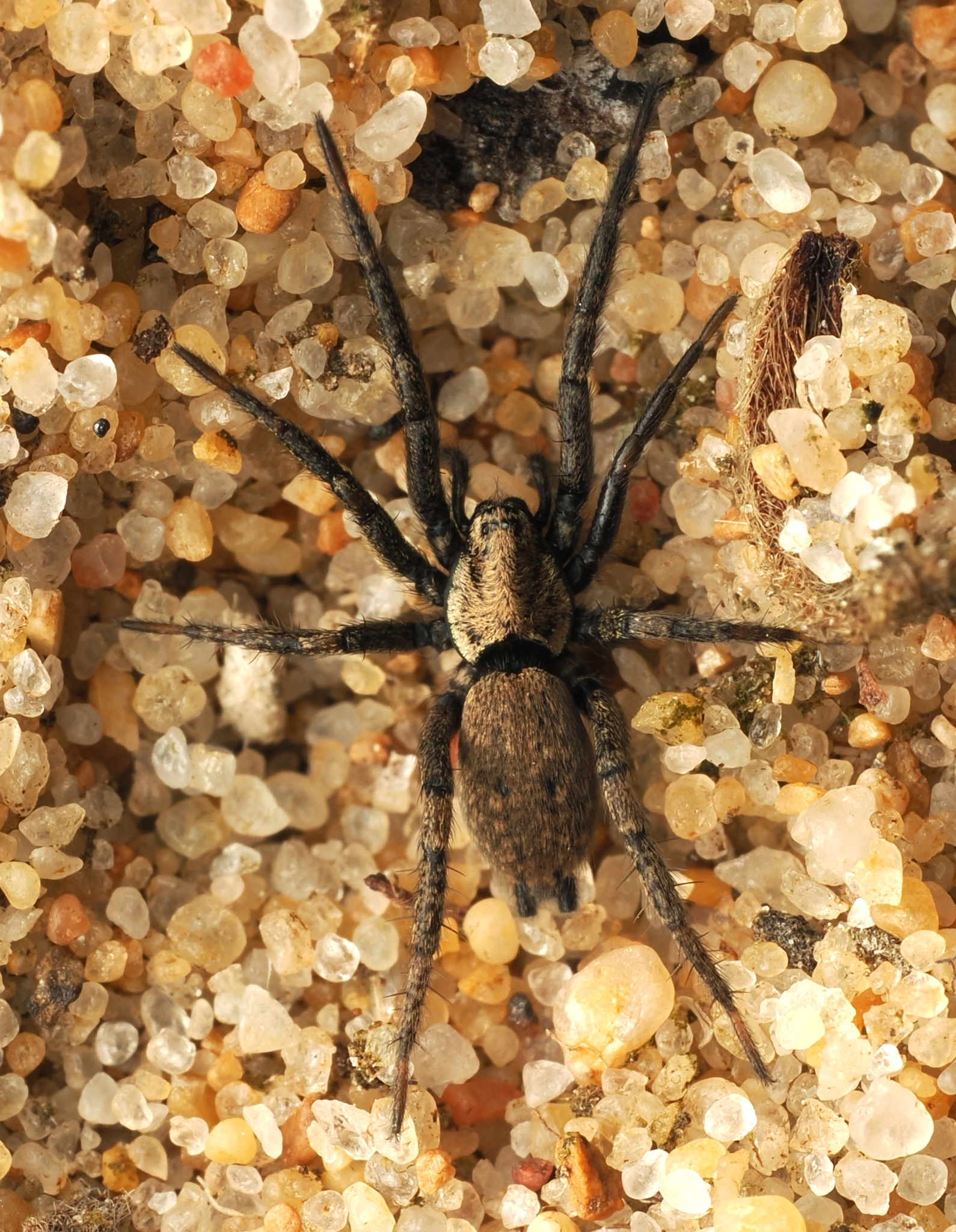
N. exornata

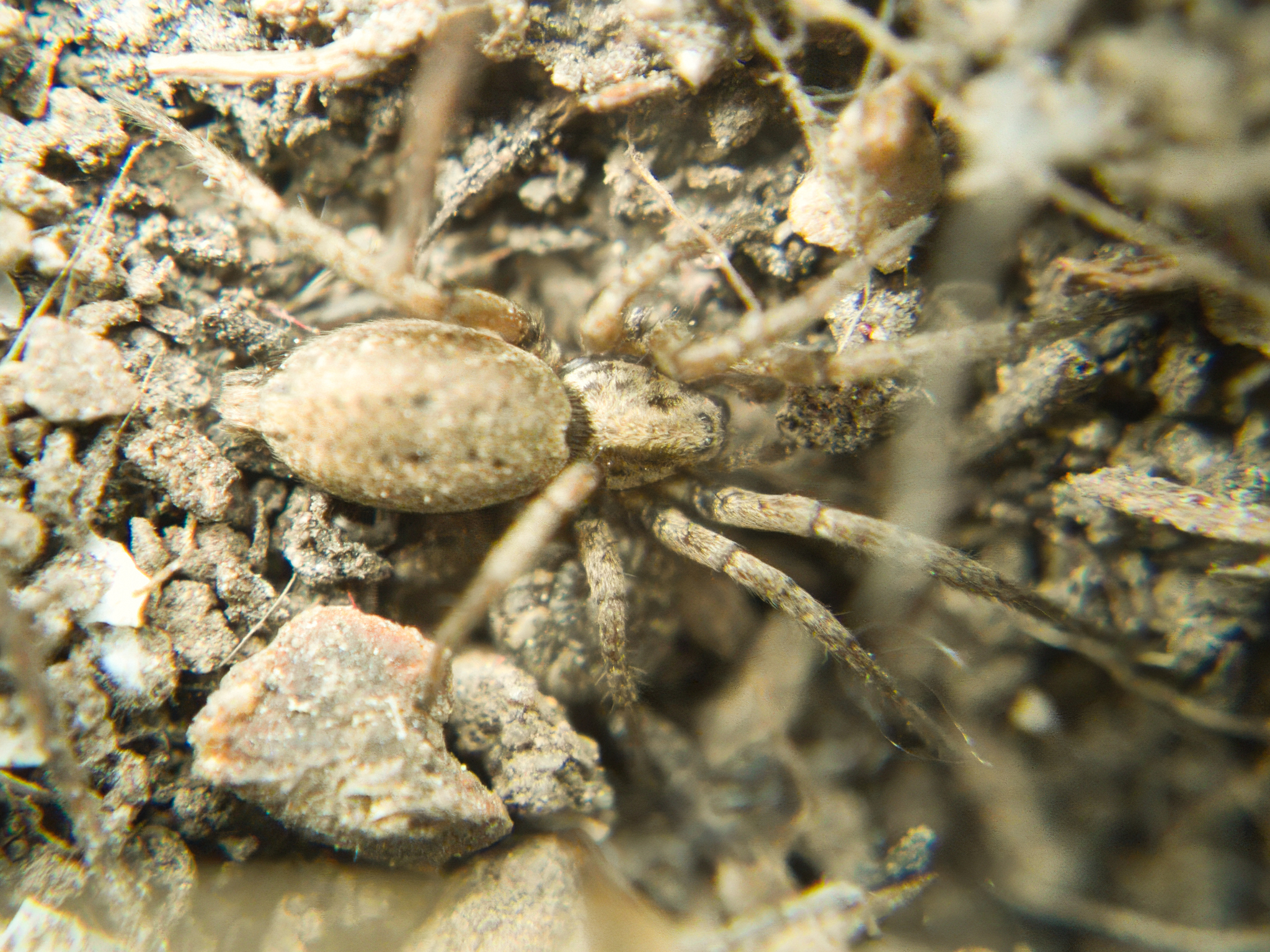
N. ripariensis

As of September 2025, this genus includes 40 species:

- Nomisia ameretatae Zamani, Chatzaki, Esyunin & Marusik, 2021 – Iran
- Nomisia amizmiz Lecigne, 2025 – Morocco
- Nomisia aussereri (L. Koch, 1872) – Mediterranean, Eastern Europe, Turkey, Middle East, Caucasus, Russia (Europe to South Siberia), Kazakhstan, Central Asia, China
- Nomisia australis Dalmas, 1921 – South Africa
- Nomisia castanea Dalmas, 1921 – Morocco, Algeria, Tunisia, Libya
- Nomisia celerrima (Simon, 1914) – Portugal, Spain, France
- Nomisia conigera (Spassky, 1941) – Turkey, Caucasus, Iran, Kazakhstan, Central Asia
- Nomisia dalmasi Lessert, 1929 – Congo
- Nomisia excerpta (O. Pickard-Cambridge, 1872) – Canary Islands, Middle East
- Nomisia exornata (C. L. Koch, 1839) – Europe, North Africa, Turkey, Caucasus, Kazakhstan, Central Asia (type species)
- Nomisia flavimana Denis, 1937 – Algeria
- Nomisia fortis Dalmas, 1921 – Canary Islands
- Nomisia frenata (Purcell, 1908) – South Africa
- Nomisia gomerensis Wunderlich, 2011 – Canary Islands
- Nomisia graciliembolus Wunderlich, 2011 – Canary Islands
- Nomisia harpax (O. Pickard-Cambridge, 1874) – India
- Nomisia kabuliana Roewer, 1961 – Afghanistan
- Nomisia levyi Chatzaki, 2010 – Kosovo, Albania, Greece
- Nomisia molendinaria (L. Koch, 1866) – Croatia, Georgia
- Nomisia monardi Lessert, 1933 – Angola
- Nomisia montenegrina Giltay, 1932 – Montenegro
- Nomisia musiva (Simon, 1889) – Canary Islands
- Nomisia negebensis Levy, 1995 – Turkey, Israel, Iran, Kazakhstan
- Nomisia notia Dalmas, 1921 – South Africa
- Nomisia orientalis Dalmas, 1921 – Greece, Turkey
- Nomisia palaestina (O. Pickard-Cambridge, 1872) – Greece, Turkey, Syria, Israel, Tajikistan
- Nomisia peloponnesiaca Chatzaki, 2010 – Albania, Greece
- Nomisia perpusilla Dalmas, 1921 – Spain
- Nomisia poecilipes Caporiacco, 1939 – Ethiopia
- Nomisia punctata (Kulczyński, 1901) – Ethiopia
- Nomisia recepta (Pavesi, 1880) – Algeria, Tunisia, Italy (mainland, Sicily), Malta, Cyprus
- Nomisia ripariensis (O. Pickard-Cambridge, 1872) – Bulgaria, Greece (incl. Crete), Turkey, Caucasus (Russia, Georgia, Azerbaijan), Syria, Lebanon, Israel, Iran
- Nomisia satulla (Simon, 1909) – Ethiopia
- Nomisia scioana (Pavesi, 1883) – Ethiopia
- Nomisia simplex (Kulczyński, 1901) – Ethiopia
- Nomisia tingitana Dalmas, 1921 – Morocco
- Nomisia transvaalica Dalmas, 1921 – South Africa
- Nomisia tubula (Tucker, 1923) – Angola, Namibia, South Africa
- Nomisia uncinata Jézéquel, 1965 – Ivory Coast
- Nomisia varia (Tucker, 1923) – Namibia, Botswana, Zimbabwe, South Africa
