= Karl Kielblock =

South African writer

- Born: 23 October 1907; Beaufort-Wes, South Africa
- Died: 26 November 1991 (aged 84)
- Occupation: Writer
- Writing career
- Language: South African

Karl Kielblock (23 October 1907 – 26 November 1991) was a South African writer.

== Biography ==
He was born on 23 October 1907 in Beaufort West and studied first at Paarl Boys' High School, then at Paarl Teachers College. In 1928 he was appointed a teacher at the Laerskool Hendrik Louw in Strand where he taught until 1967.

In 1936 his first book, Die Skat van Java, was published. After that, Kielblock wrote various novels, suspense, and youth literature. In 1970 he received the Academy's Scheepers Prize for youth literature for his book Rebel. Kielblock's suspense books consist of a series with the investigator Frans Lindenhof. His youth books also include a series with the character Lafras Cuyper.

In 1939 he married Vera Abel, from whom he had a son and a daughter. He died on 26 November 1991.

== Bibliography ==
A total of 43 titles were published by Karl Kielblock.

1. Adriaan Deneys 1947
2. Daar het 'n ster verskyn 1984
3. Die avonture van kaptein Elias Sonnenschein 1944
4. Die erfenis
5. Die helder stad 1979
6. Die lafaard 1968
7. Die raaisel in die spieël 1970
8. Die skaam man – 1959
9. Die skat van Java – 1936
10. Die swaard verteer −1950
11. Die vete – 1962
12. Nooi uit die vreemde – 1961
13. Die verlore skat – 1964
14. Die vreemdeling – 1938
15. Die wraak van Jasper le Feuvre
16. Ek, die moordenaar – 1951
17. Guillam Woudberg – 1945
18. Guillam Woudberg keer terug – 1965
19. Jasper le Feuvre
20. Lafras Cuyper en die Britse Lokval
21. Lafras Cuyper en die gravin – 1979
22. Lafras Cuyper en die Hirondelle
23. Lafras Cuyper in Frankryk
24. Lafras Cuyper in Venesië
25. Lafras Cuyper Kanonier – 1964
26. Lodewyk Alleman se soektog
27. Luitenant Lafras Cuyper
28. Mooier as die blomme – 1961
29. Moord in Arkadia
30. Moord op Allesverloren – 1948
31. Moord op Eendevlei – 1964
32. Moord op Geitjieskop −1950
33. Moord op Kroonbaai – 1961
34. Nooi uit die vreemde – 1961
35. Onder die stil waters – 1964
36. Onrus op Rusdal – 1963
37. Rebel – 1969
38. Rivier van drome
39. Skuil in die skaduwees – 1965
40. Sonia Clercq – 1960
41. Soos water op die grond – 1944
42. Vaandrig Freyn – 1966
43. Verhale uit Herodotos – 1977

== Notes ==
- "Die skat van Java" is later reissued as "Die verlore skat"
- "Die wraak van Jasper le Feuvre" is a shortened version of "Jasper le Feuvre"
- "Guillam Woudberg keer terug" is a shortened version of "Guillam Woudberg".
