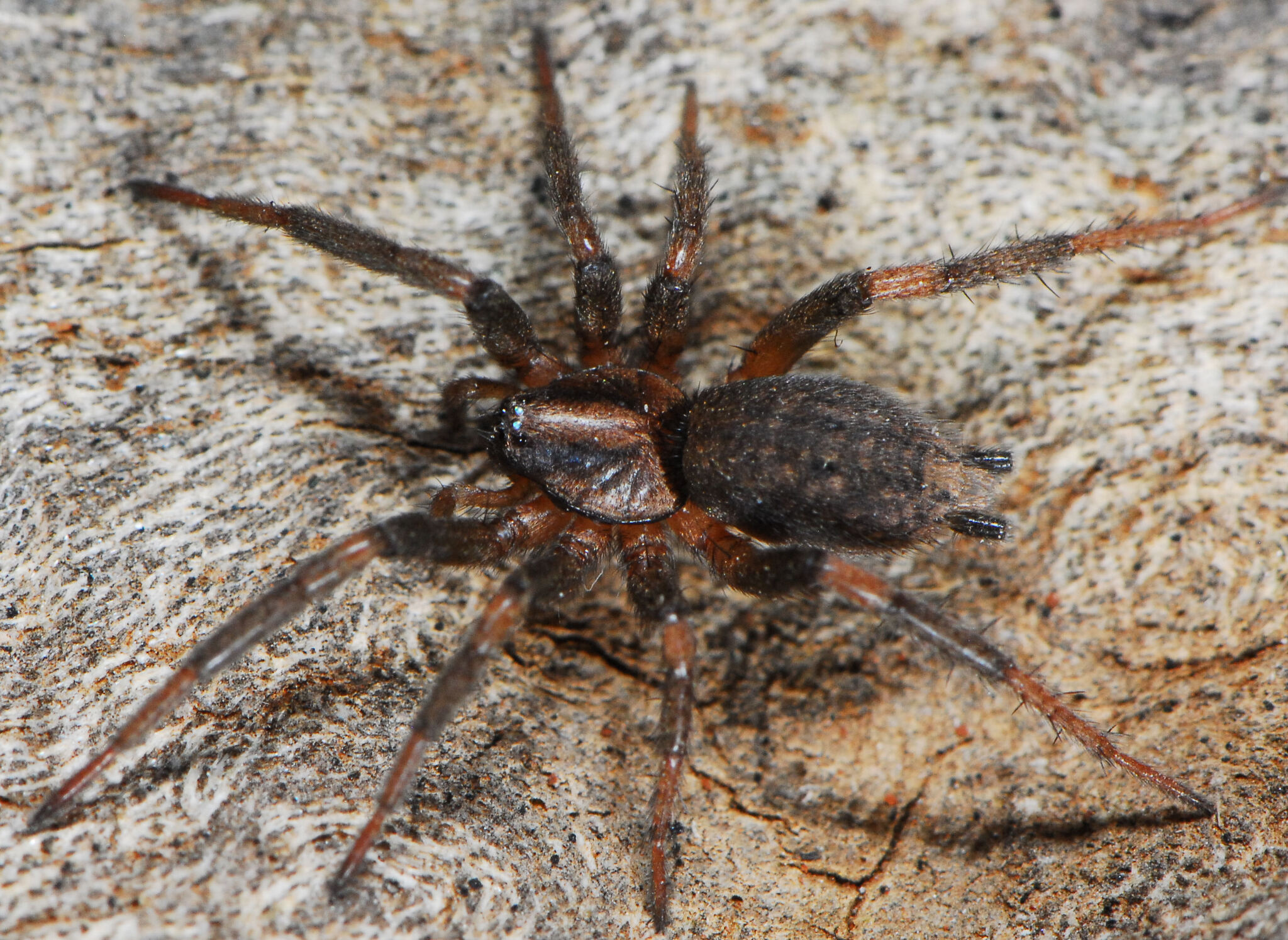
- female
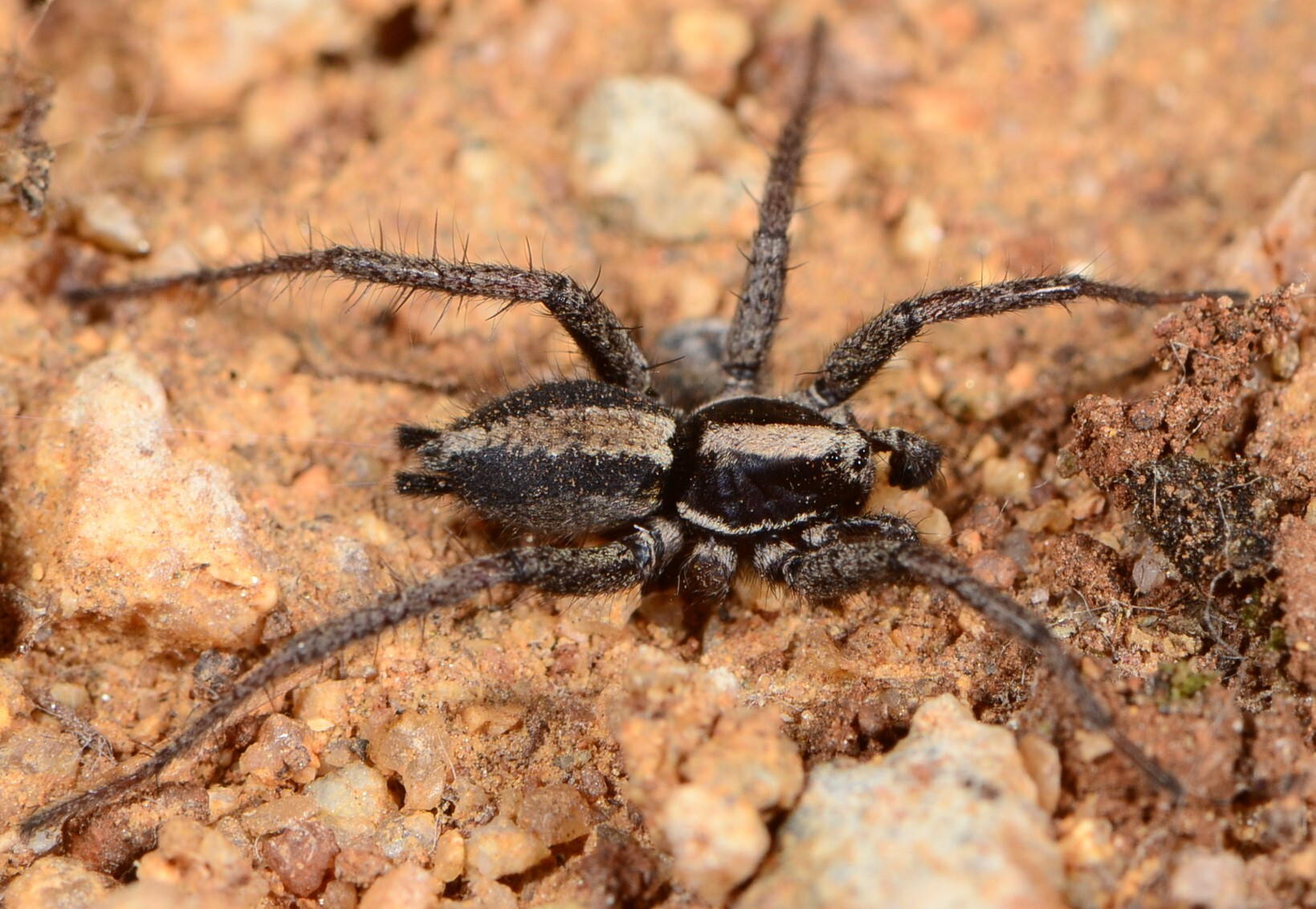
- male

Scientific classification
- Kingdom: Animalia
- Phylum: Arthropoda
- Subphylum: Chelicerata
- Class: Arachnida
- Order: Araneae
- Infraorder: Araneomorphae
- Family: Gnaphosidae
- Genus: Nomisia
- Species: N. varia

Binomial name
- Nomisia varia (Tucker, 1923)

Synonyms
- Callilepis varius Tucker, 1923; Pterotricha varia Roewer, 1955

= Nomisia varia =

Common Spotted Nomisia Ground Spider

Species of spider

Nomisia varia is a species of spider in the family Gnaphosidae. It occurs in southern Africa and is commonly known as the common spotted Nomisia ground spider.

== Distribution ==
Nomisia varia has a very wide distribution across southern Africa, occurring in Botswana, Zimbabwe, Namibia, and South Africa. In South Africa, it occurs in all nine provinces at altitudes ranging from 6 to 1,730 m above sea level.

== Habitat and ecology ==
The species is a free-living ground spider that constructs silken sacs under stones and surface debris. It is found in Fynbos, Grassland, Savanna, and Thicket biomes, and has also been sampled from agricultural areas including cotton fields and pistachio orchards.

== Description ==
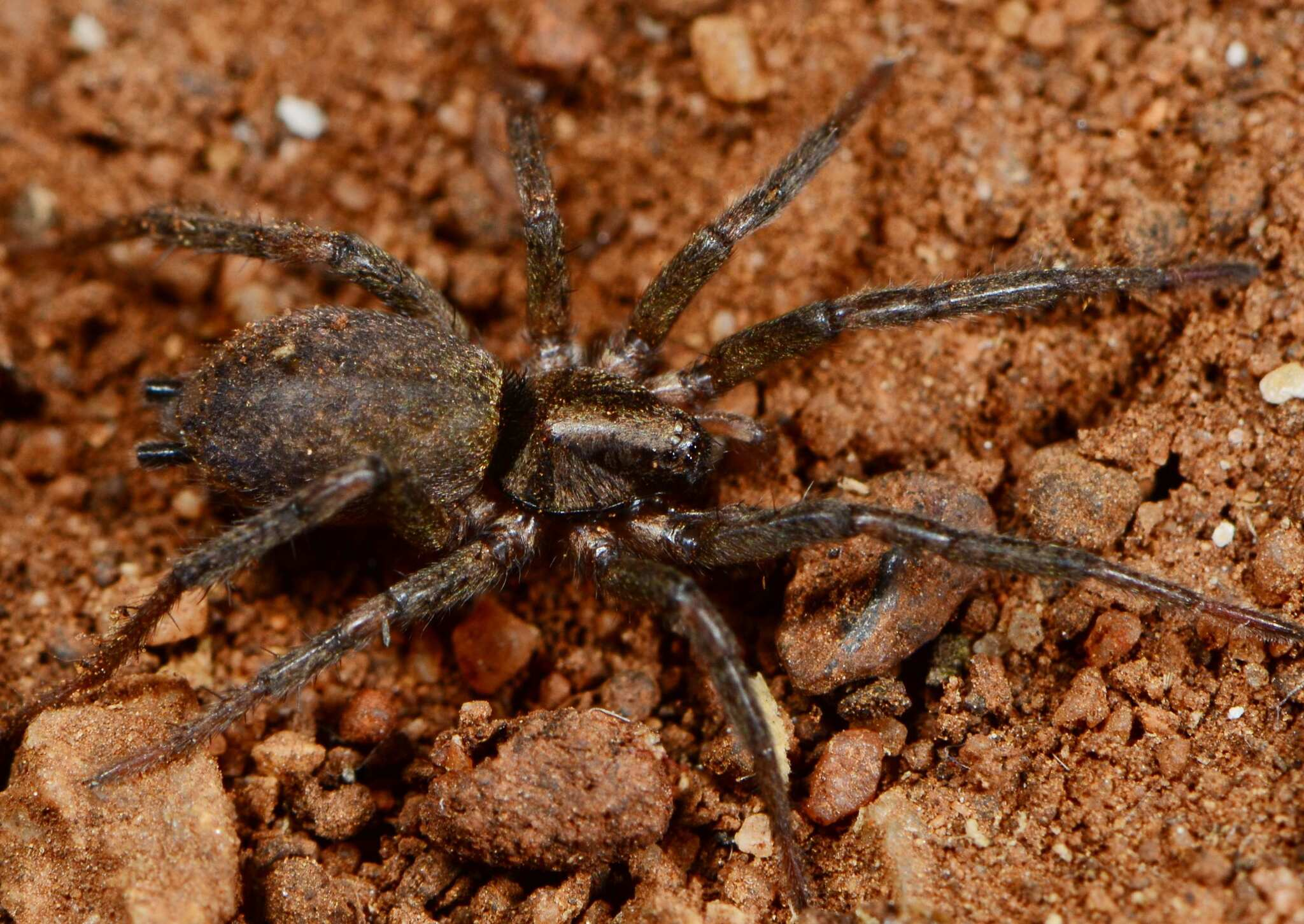
female

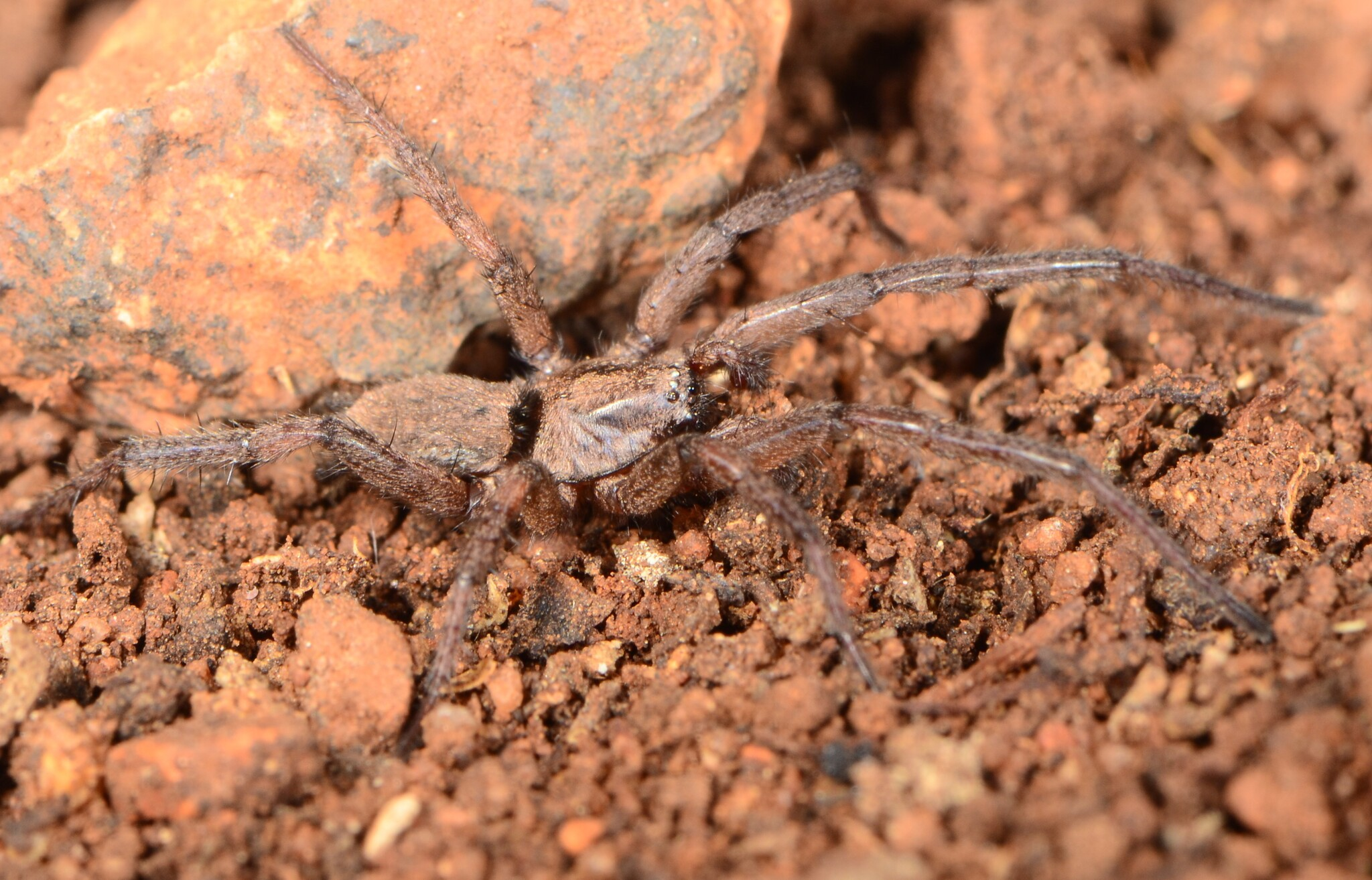
female

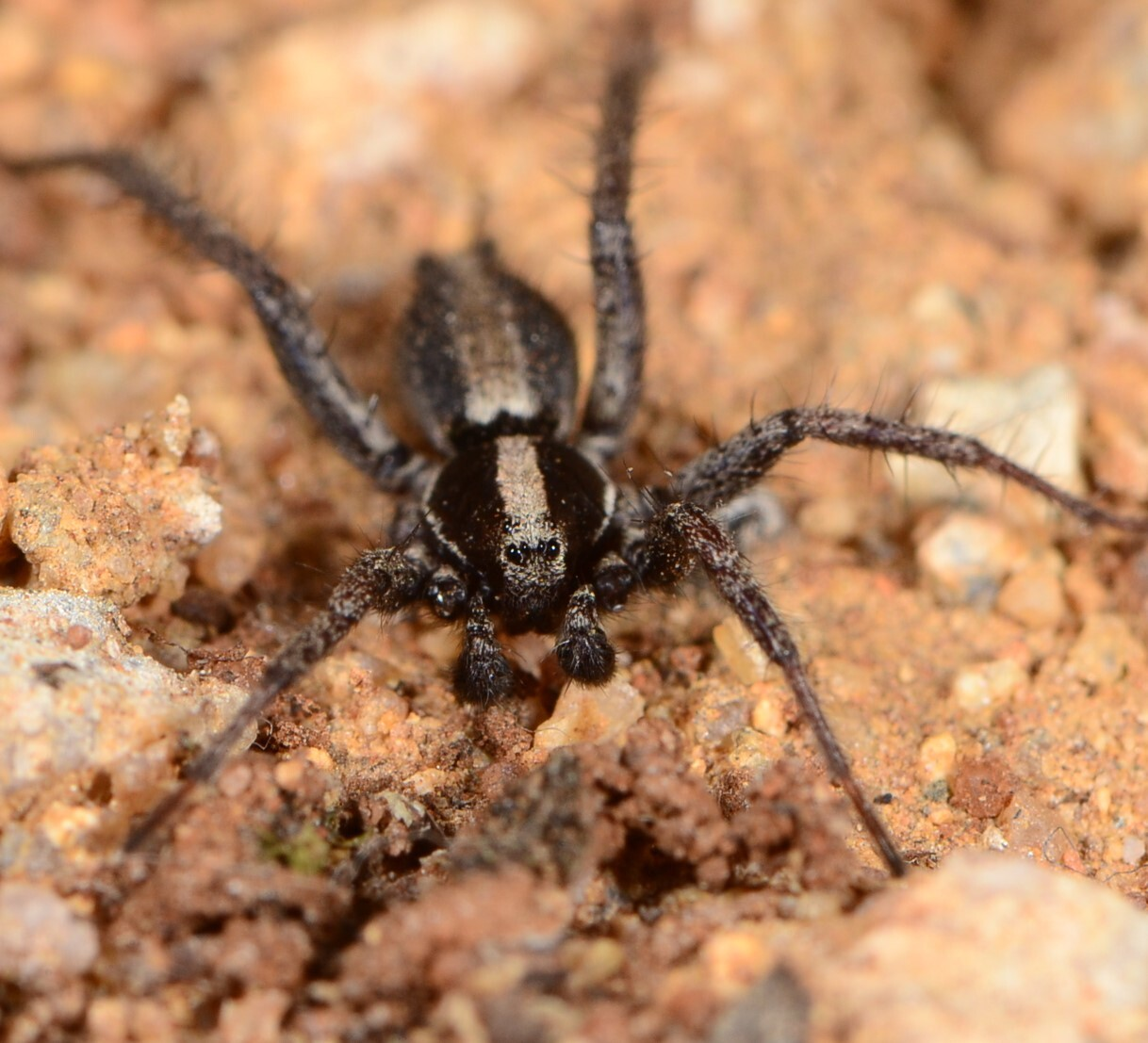
male

== Conservation ==
Nomisia varia is listed as Least Concern due to its very wide range across southern Africa, occurring in all South African provinces. Although threatened by habitat loss for agricultural activities and urbanization in parts of its range, the species has a wide distribution. It is protected in more than ten protected areas.

== Taxonomy ==
The species was originally described by Tucker in 1923 as Callilepis varius from the junction between the Crocodile and Marico Rivers. It was transferred to Pterotricha by Roewer in 1955, and then to the genus Nomisia by Murphy in 2007.
