= Nomisia frenata =

Scientific classification
- Kingdom: Animalia
- Phylum: Arthropoda
- Subphylum: Chelicerata
- Class: Arachnida
- Order: Araneae
- Infraorder: Araneomorphae
- Family: Gnaphosidae
- Genus: Nomisia
- Species: N. frenata

Binomial name
- Nomisia frenata (Purcell, 1908)

Synonyms
- Callilepis frenata Purcell, 1908

Species of spider

Nomisia frenata is a species of spider in the family Gnaphosidae. It is endemic to South Africa.

== Distribution ==
Nomisia frenata has a very restricted distribution in South Africa's Northern Cape province, with a very small range. The species is known only from the type locality at Kamaggas at an altitude of 231 m above sea level.

== Habitat and ecology ==
The species is a free-living ground dweller found in the Succulent Karoo biome.

== Description ==
Only the female of N. frenata is known. The carapace is medium brown, paler in the ocular area to the fovea, with dark edges and slight radial infuscation from the fovea, especially to the base of the ocular area. The abdomen is brownish black. The legs are yellowish brown with reddish distal segments. Total length is 6.8 mm.

== Conservation ==
Nomisia frenata is listed as Data Deficient for taxonomic reasons. The species has a very small range and too little is known about the location, distribution and threats for an assessment to be made. More sampling is needed to collect males and determine the species' actual range.

== Taxonomy ==
The species was originally described by Purcell in 1908 as Callilepis frenata from Kamaggas. It was later transferred to the genus Nomisia by Dalmas in 1921. It has not been revised since and only the female is known.
