= Nomisia tubula =

Spotted Nomisia Ground Spider

Conservation status
- Least Concern (SANBI Red List)

Scientific classification
- Kingdom: Animalia
- Phylum: Arthropoda
- Subphylum: Chelicerata
- Class: Arachnida
- Order: Araneae
- Infraorder: Araneomorphae
- Family: Gnaphosidae
- Genus: Nomisia
- Species: N. tubula

Binomial name
- Nomisia tubula (Tucker, 1923)

Synonyms
- Callilepis tubulus Tucker, 1923

Species of spider

Nomisia tubula is a species of spider in the family Gnaphosidae. It occurs in southern Africa and is commonly known as the spotted Nomisia ground spider.

== Distribution ==
Nomisia tubula has a wide distribution across southern Africa, occurring in Angola, Namibia, and South Africa. In South Africa, it is found in four provinces, Free State, KwaZulu-Natal, Limpopo, and North West, at altitudes ranging from 250 to 1,246 m above sea level.

== Habitat and ecology ==
The species is a free-living ground dweller found in Grassland and Savanna biomes.

== Conservation ==
Nomisia tubula is listed as Least Concern due to its wide geographic range across southern Africa. The species is protected in several protected areas including Amanzi Private Game Reserve, Ophathe Game Reserve, Ndumo Game Reserve, Blouberg Nature Reserve, and Maremani Game Reserve.

== Taxonomy ==
The species was originally described by Tucker in 1923 as Callilepis tubulus from Namibia. It was later transferred to the genus Nomisia by Lessert in 1933. It has not been revised since and is known only from the male.
