= Nomisia notia =

Scientific classification
- Kingdom: Animalia
- Phylum: Arthropoda
- Subphylum: Chelicerata
- Class: Arachnida
- Order: Araneae
- Infraorder: Araneomorphae
- Family: Gnaphosidae
- Genus: Nomisia
- Species: N. notia

Binomial name
- Nomisia notia Comte de Dalmas, 1921

Species of spider

Nomisia notia is a species of spider in the family Gnaphosidae. It is endemic to South Africa.

== Distribution ==
Nomisia notia has a very restricted distribution in South Africa's Northern Cape province, with a very small range. The species is known only from the type locality given as Little Namaqualand at an altitude of 553 m above sea level.

== Habitat and ecology ==
The species is a free-living ground dweller found in the Succulent Karoo biome.

== Conservation ==
Nomisia notia is listed as Data Deficient for taxonomic reasons. The species has a very small range and too little is known about the location, distribution and threats for an assessment to be made. More sampling is needed to collect males and determine the species' actual range.

== Taxonomy ==
The species was described by Dalmas in 1921 from Little Namaqualand. It has not been revised since and is known only from the female.
