= Boy Louw =

South African rugby union player

- Born: Matthys Michael Louw; 21 February 1906 Wellington, Cape Colony
- Died: 3 May 1988 (aged 82) Belville, South Africa
- Height: 1.80 m (5 ft 11 in)
- Weight: 91 kg (201 lb)
- School: Paarl Boys' High School
- Notable relative(s): Fanie Louw (brother), Japie Louw (uncle)

Rugby union career
- Position(s): Prop, Second row, Loose-forward
Amateur team(s)
Years	Team	Apps	(Points)
- Caledon Club
- Paarl RC
- Gardens RFC
Provincial / State sides
Years	Team	Apps	(Points)
1924–38	Western Province	21	(161)
International career
Years	Team	Apps	(Points)
1928–38	South Africa	18	(3)
- Correct as of 2007-08-16

Matthys (Boy) Michael Louw (21 February 1906 – 3 May 1988), was a rugby union player on the South African rugby team. His primary position was prop but he also played in the line-out for the Springboks at second row, flanker and number eight.

== Biography ==
Louw was born on the farm Watervlei near Wellington as the fifth child of ten brothers and five sisters. One brother died young, he and Fanie Louw became Springboks and the other brothers all played senior rugby.

Louw made his debut for Western Province as a teenage schoolboy against the British Isles in 1924. His Springbok debut was in 1928 against the visiting All Blacks, when he was selected as lock for the fourth test at the Crusaders Ground in Port Elizabeth. Louw played 18 test matches for the Boks, 13 of which as loosehead prop and scored one try. He also played 31 tour matches in which he scored five tries.

=== Test history ===
No.	Opponents	Results (SA 1st)	Position	Tries	Dates	Venue
1.	New Zealand	11–6	Lock		18 Aug 1928	Crusaders Ground, Port Elizabeth
2.	New Zealand	5–13	Loosehead Prop		1 Sep 1928	Newlands, Cape Town
3.	Wales	8–3	Loosehead prop		5 Dec 1931	St. Helen's, Swansea
4.	Ireland	8–3	Loosehead prop		19 Dec 1931	Lansdowne Road, Dublin
5.	England	7–0	Loosehead prop		2 Jan 1932	Twickenham, London
6.	Scotland	6–3	Loosehead prop		16 Jan 1932	Murrayfield, Edinburgh
7.	Australia	17–3	Loosehead prop		8 Jul 1933	Newlands, Cape Town
8.	Australia	6–21	Lock		22 Jul 1933	Kingsmead, Durban
9.	Australia	12–3	Loosehead prop	1	12 Aug 1933	Ellis Park, Johannesburg
10.	Australia	11–0	Flank		26 Aug 1933	Crusaders Ground, Port Elizabeth
11.	Australia	4–15	Flank		2 Sep 1933	Springbok Park, Bloemfontein
12.	Australia	9–5	Number Eight		26 Jun 1937	Sydney Cricket Ground, Sydney
13.	Australia	26–17	Loosehead prop		17 Jul 1937	Sydney Cricket Ground, Sydney
14.	New Zealand	13–6	Loosehead prop		4 Sep 1937	Lancaster Park, Christchurch
15.	New Zealand	17–6	Loosehead prop		25 Sep 1937	Eden Park, Auckland
16.	(United Kingdom) British Isles	26–12	Loosehead prop		6 Aug 1938	Ellis Park Park, Johannesburg
17.	(United Kingdom) British Isles	19–3	Loosehead prop		3 Sep 1938	Crusaders Ground, Port Elizabeth
18.	(United Kingdom) British Isles	16–21	Loosehead prop		10 Sep 1938	Newlands, Cape Town

== See also ==
- List of South Africa national rugby union players – Springbok no. 207
