= Paarl Boys' High School =

Boys' school in South Africa

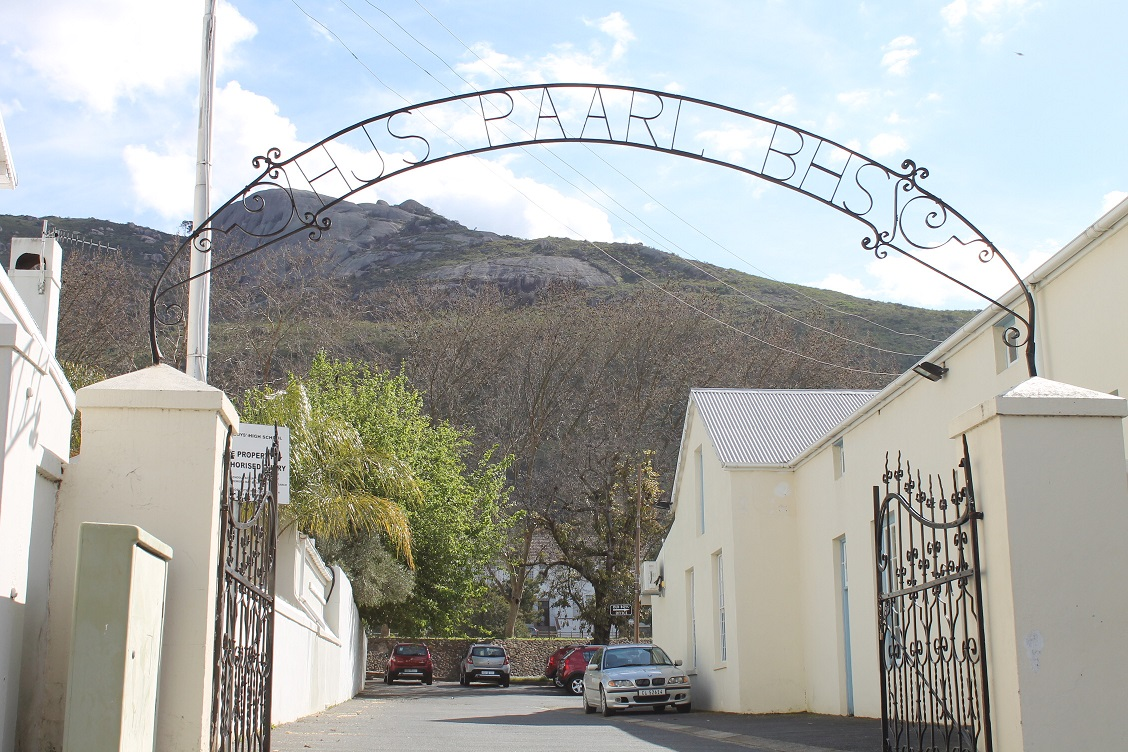

Location
- Paarl, Western Cape; South Africa
- 33°44′21″S 18°57′37″E

Information
- School type: All-boys public school
- Motto: Tandem Fit Arbor Surculus (From a twig to a tree)
- Religious affiliation: Christianity
- Established: 18 May 1868; 158 years ago
- Sister school: Paarl Girls' High School
- School district: District 9
- School number: +27 (021) 872 2875
- Headmaster: Derek Swart
- Grades: 8–12
- Gender: Male
- Age: 14 to 18
- Enrollment: 950 boys
- Language: Afrikaans; English
- Schedule: 07:35 – 14:15
- Campus: Urban Campus
- Campus type: Suburban
- Houses: Berlyn; Bellevue; Imhoff; Montebello; Villeria; Werda; Zederberg
- Colours: Navy; Sky Blue; White
- Nickname: Galpille
- Rivals: Bishops Diocesan College; Grey College, Bloemfontein; Paarl Gimnasium; Paul Roos Gymnasium; Rondebosch Boys' High School; Wynberg Boys' High School
- Accreditation: Western Cape Education Department
- Website: paarlboyshigh.org.za

Paarl Boys' High School, known in Afrikaans as Hoër Jongenskool Paarl (or Boishaai), is a public dual-medium high school for boys and is one of the oldest schools in South Africa, built in 1868. The school is situated in Paarl, a town in the Western Cape province of South Africa. The first headmaster of the school was George Jeffreys. Effective as of 2007, the headmaster of the school is Derek Swart.

== War cry ==
The Paarl Boys' High war cry, or 'Kreet', has changed much over the years, but the current war cry is as follows:

Shimalaya wha!
Shimalaya wha!
HJS HJS
Wha 'sop – 'sop 'sop 'sop
We are – we are
HJS HJS
Wha 'sop, Shimalaya wha!

== Headmasters ==
Name	Started	Finished
G Jeffreys	1868	1873
J Hoffman	1873	1876
T Walker	1876	1877
H Nixon	1878	1882
B le Roux	1882	1887
J Zahn	1887	1888
J Rettie	1889	1895
CEZ Watermeyer	1896	
MC Fourie	1897	1901
PJ du Pré le Roux	1901	1924
SJ Malherbe	1924	1940
GJ Pretorius	1941	1958
Dr JAC Visagie	1959	1960
HA Lambrechts	1961	
Dr PS Meyer	1962	1966
CD Koch	1967	1974
TW Engela	1975	1989
L Knoetze	1990	2007
D Swart	2007	present

== Sport ==
Each year the school takes part in one of the biggest interschool events in South Africa against its arch-rival, Paarl Gimnasium High School. The main event (the u/19A rugby match) attracts over 20 000 spectators to the Faure Street Stadium. The school has produced many Springboks, from Boy Louw, Mannetjies Roux and "Prince of Wings" Carel du Plessis, to more recent players like Corné Krige (former Springbok Captain), Gurthro Steenkamp, Frans Malherbe, Thomas du Toit, Salmaan Moerat and Evan Roos.

== Notable old boys ==
List of the old boys that were matriculated in Paarl Boys High School.

- Wium Basson – South African rugby player
- Jim Fouché (Class of 1924) – Former State President of South Africa
- Bjorn Fortuin – South African cricketer
- David Frost – South African golfer
- Corné Krige – South African rugby player
- Christo Wiese – South African businessman and billionaire
- Jean-Luc du Plessis – Provincial rugby player
- Wilhelm van der Sluys – Provincial rugby player
- Thomas du Toit (Class of 2013) – South African rugby player
- Boy Louw (Class of 1924) – South African rugby player
- Eugène Marais – South African barrister, poet and writer
- Dawid Malan – English professional cricketer
- Frans Malherbe – South African rugby player
- David Meihuizen – South African rugby player
- Carel du Plessis – South African rugby player
- Evan Roos – South African rugby player
- Mannetjies Roux – South African rugby player
- Gurthrö Steenkamp (Class of 2000) – South African rugby player
- Salmaan Moerat – South African rugby player
- Karl Kielblock – author
