= Beaufort West =

Beaufort West Beaufort-Wes (in Afrikaans) eBhofolo (in Xhosa)
- Town
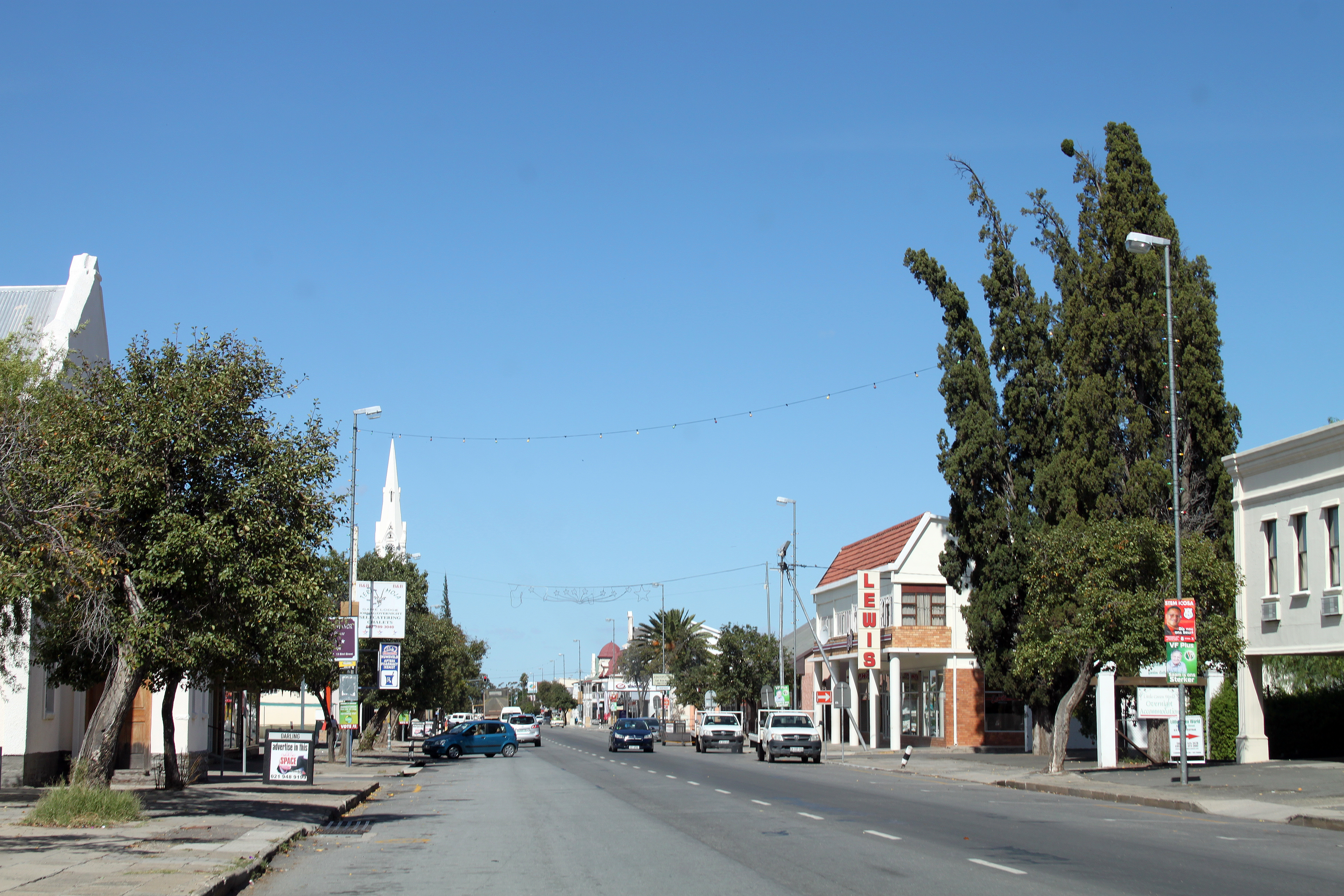
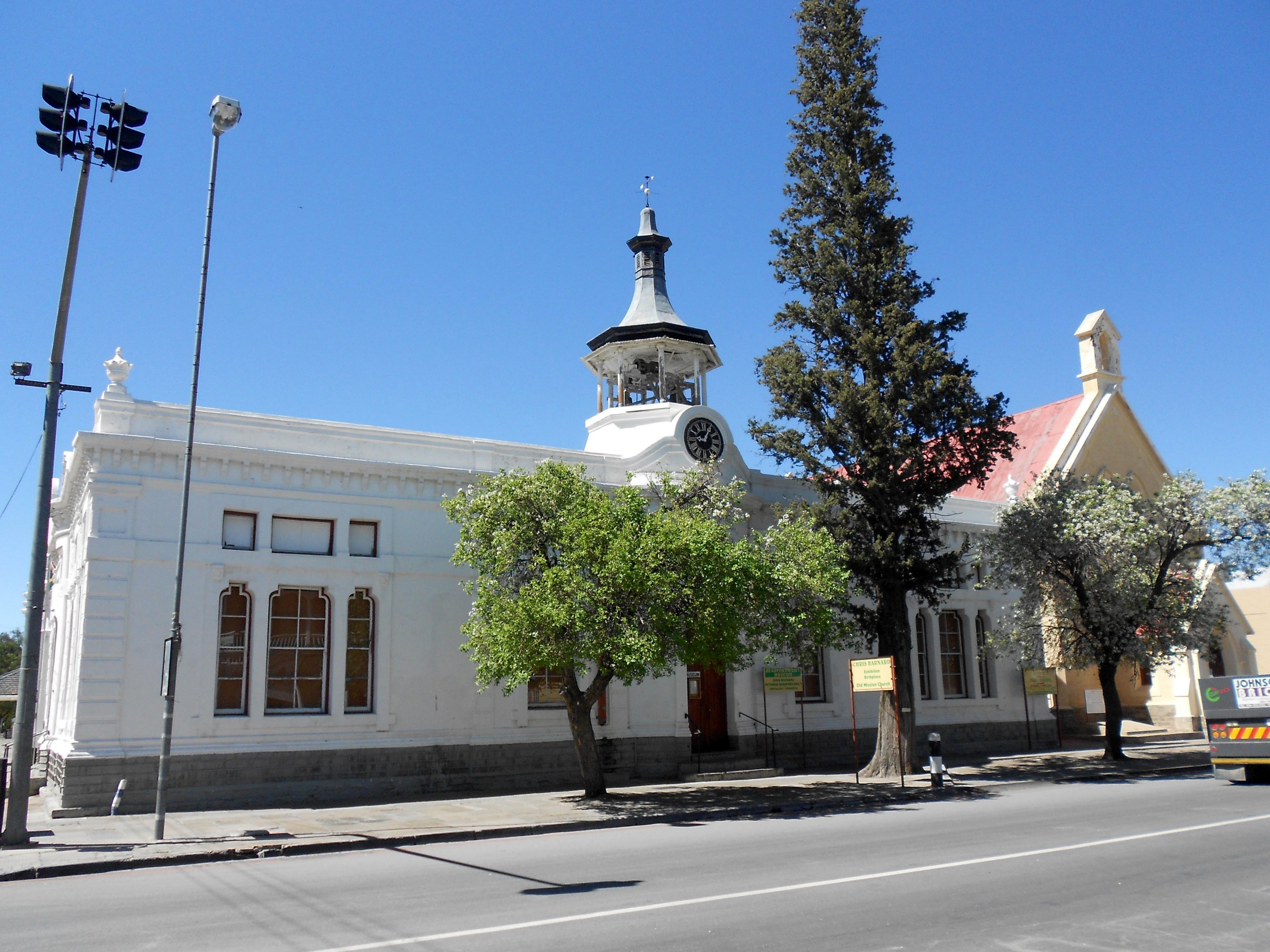
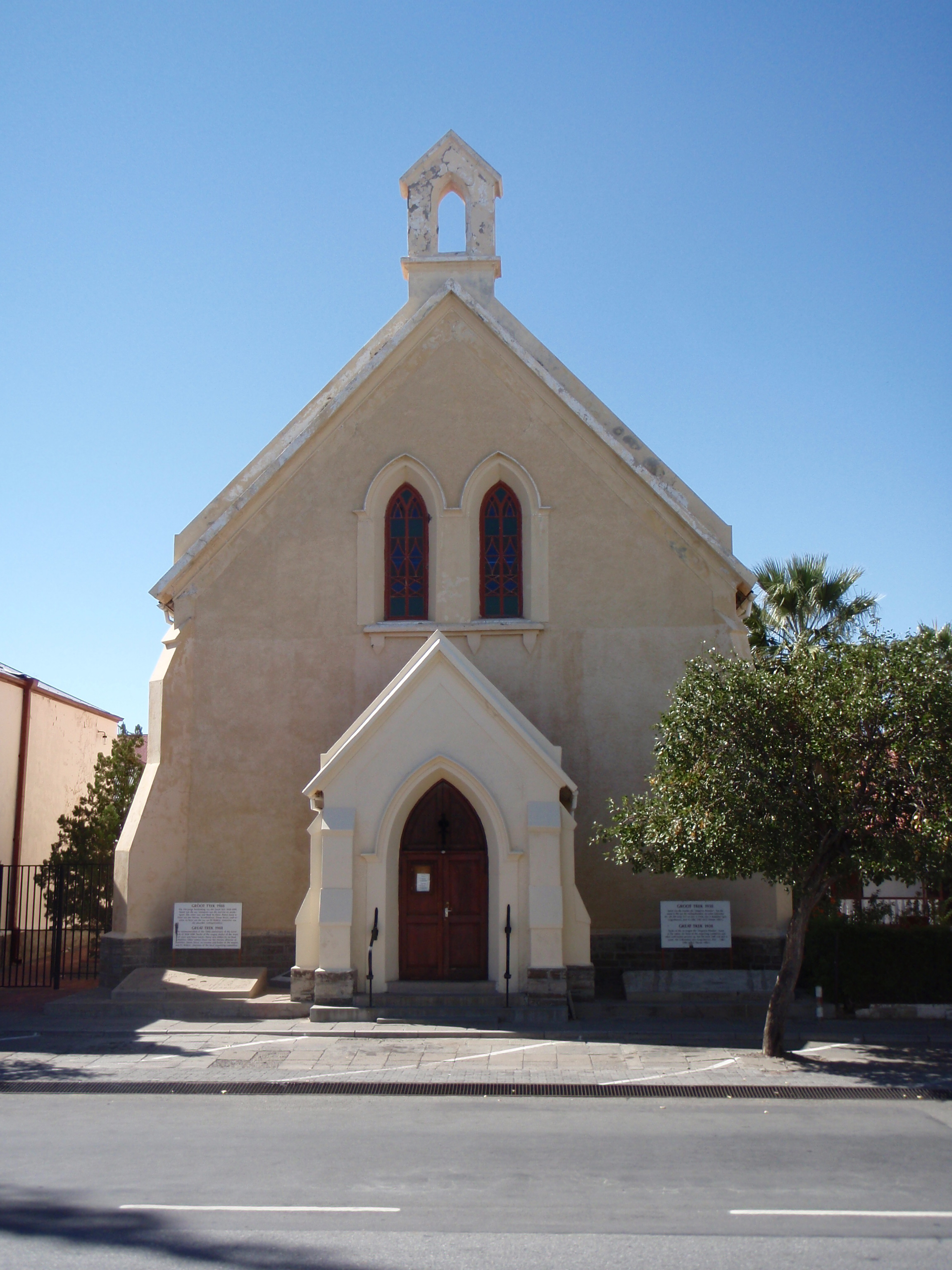
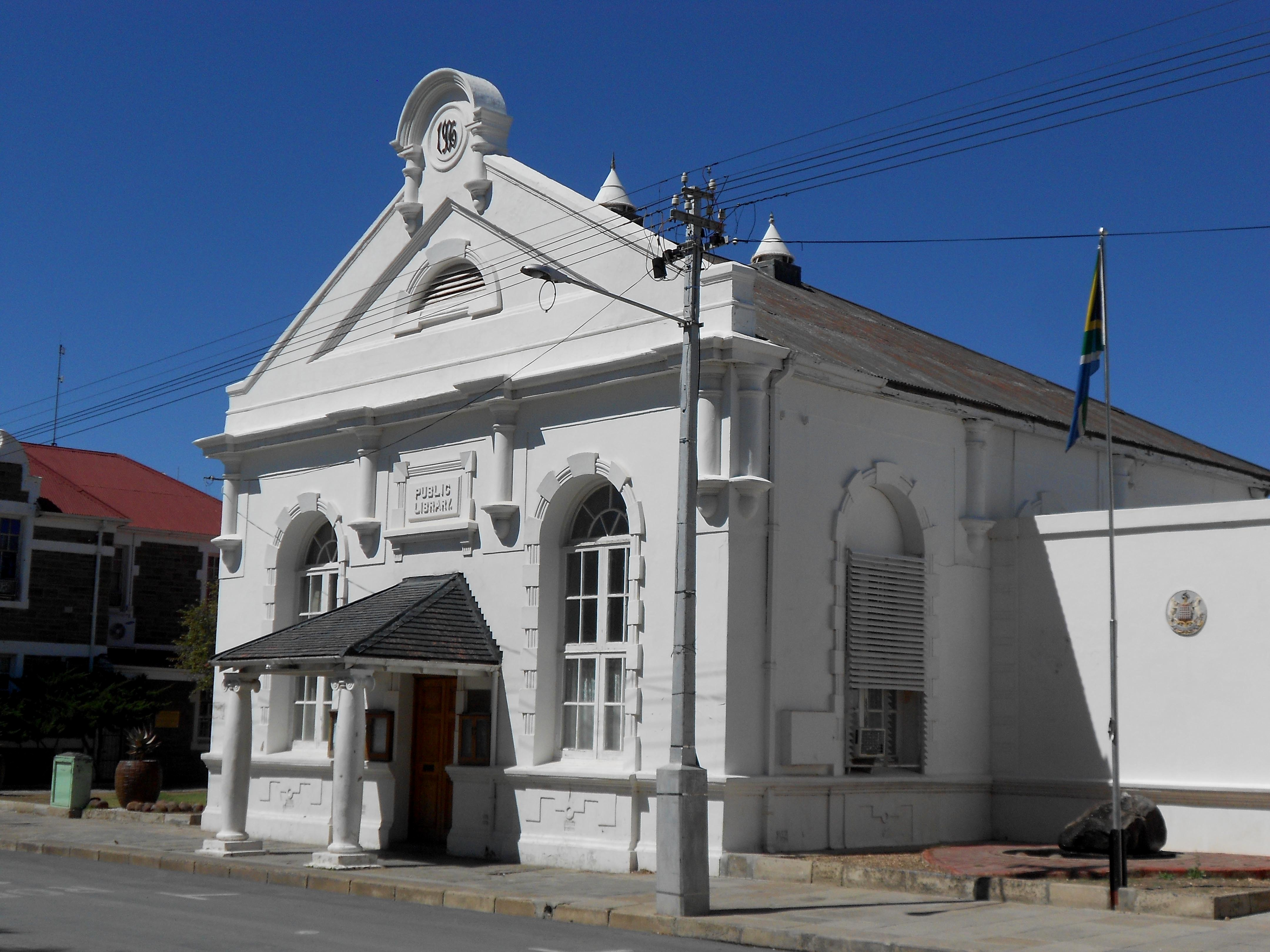
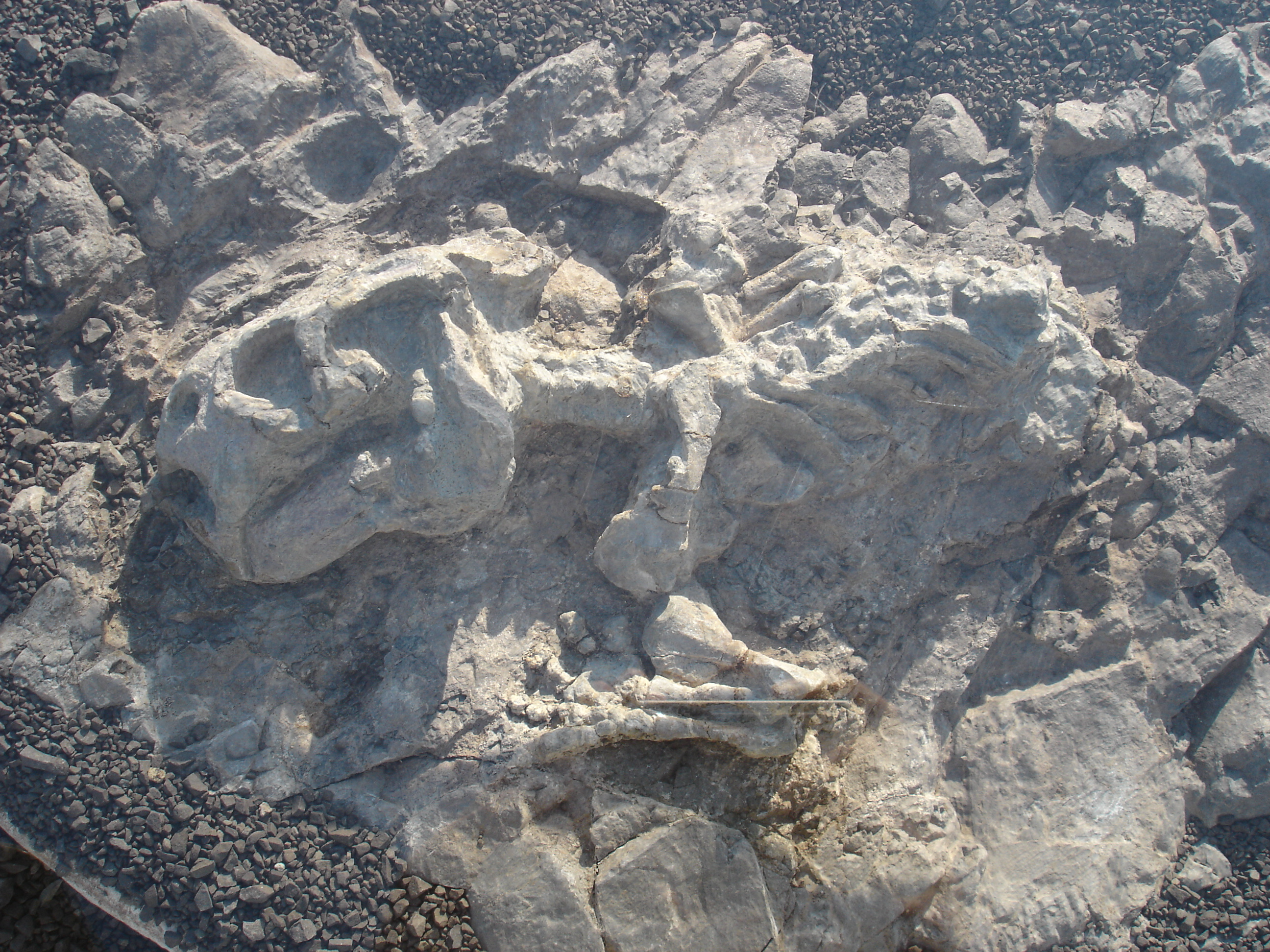
- Top: a view down Main Street. Mid: Beauford West museum and old NK Church. Bottom left: library. Bottom right: Diictodon fossil.
- Motto: Festina Lente (Latin: Make Haste Slowly)
- Location within Western Cape Location within South Africa Location within Africa
- Coordinates: 32°21′S 22°35′E
- Country: South Africa
- Province: Western Cape
- District: Central Karoo
- Municipality: Beaufort West
- Established: 1818

Area
  - Total: 56.5 km^{2} (21.8 sq mi)
- Elevation: 900 m (3,000 ft)

Population (2011)
  - Total: 34,085
  - Density: 603/km^{2} (1,560/sq mi)

Racial makeup (2011)
  - Black African: 7.25%
  - Coloured: 77.92%
  - Indian/Asian: 0.53%
  - White: 13.66%
  - Other: 0.64%

First languages (2011)
  - Afrikaans: 91.48%
  - Xhosa: 3.59%
  - English: 2.47%
  - Other: 2.46%
- Time zone: UTC+2 (SAST)
- Postal code (street): 6970
- PO box: 6970
- Area code: 023
- Website: www.beaufortwestmun.co.za

Beaufort West (Afrikaans: Beaufort-Wes; Xhosa: eBhobhofolo) is a town in the Western Cape province in South Africa. It is the largest town in the arid Great Karoo region, and is known as the "Capital of the Karoo". It forms part of the Beaufort West Local Municipality, with 34,085 inhabitants in 2011.

It is the centre of an agricultural district based mainly on sheep farming, and is a significant town and logistical support hub on the N1 national road.

Next door to Beaufort West is the Karoo National Park. Important Permian fossils have been found in the area to the west of the town. These were initially found by David Baird, son of the local magistrate in 1827. The old Town Hall and the Dutch Reformed Church have been declared national monuments.

== History ==
Beaufort West was the first town to be established in the central Karoo. The town was founded in 1818 and initially named Beaufort after Henry Somerset, 5th Duke of Beaufort, who was the father of Lord Charles Henry Somerset, then governor of the Cape Colony. The town was renamed Beaufort West in 1869 to avoid confusion with Port Beaufort in the Western Cape as well as Fort Beaufort in the Eastern Cape.

The town became prosperous with the introduction of Saxon Merino sheep. One of those who first farmed them, John Molteno, was a young Anglo-Italian immigrant who then founded the town's first bank in 1854 and went on to become the first Prime Minister of the Cape.

Beaufort West became the first municipality in South Africa on 3 February 1837 and had the country's first town hall. When the railroad reached the town in 1880 it became a marshalling yard and locomotive depot and today it is the largest town in the Karoo.

Professor Christiaan Barnard, the town’s most famous son, performed the first successful human-to-human heart transplant. He is honoured in the local museum, which houses a display of awards presented to him and a replica of the original heart transplant theatre.

Beaufort West is the site of one of the largest migrations of mammals on record. In 1849, Sir John Fraser (son of the local Dutch Reformed Church minister) observed and famously documented a herd of springbok that took three days to pass the town.

The 1936 census recorded a total population 7,966 residents in the town.

== Climate ==
Climate data for Beaufort West (1963–1987)
Month	Jan	Feb	Mar	Apr	May	Jun	Jul	Aug	Sep	Oct	Nov	Dec	Year
Record high °C (°F)	41 (106)	41 (106)	39 (102)	36 (97)	32 (90)	29 (84)	29 (84)	34 (93)	36 (97)	39 (102)	41 (106)	40 (104)	41 (106)
Mean daily maximum °C (°F)	32 (90)	31 (88)	29 (84)	24 (75)	21 (70)	19 (66)	18 (64)	20 (68)	23 (73)	26 (79)	28 (82)	31 (88)	25 (77)
Mean daily minimum °C (°F)	16 (61)	15 (59)	14 (57)	10 (50)	8 (46)	5 (41)	4 (39)	5 (41)	7 (45)	10 (50)	12 (54)	14 (57)	10 (50)
Record low °C (°F)	8 (46)	5 (41)	4 (39)	0 (32)	−3 (27)	−5 (23)	−6 (21)	−5 (23)	−4 (25)	−1 (30)	3 (37)	4 (39)	−6 (21)
Average precipitation mm (inches)	35 (1.4)	30 (1.2)	30 (1.2)	20 (0.8)	11 (0.4)	8 (0.3)	9 (0.4)	14 (0.6)	12 (0.5)	21 (0.8)	27 (1.1)	19 (0.7)	236 (9.3)
Average precipitation days (≥ 1.0 mm)	4	4	5	5	3	3	2	3	3	4	5	3	43
Source: South African Weather Service

== Famous residents ==
- Jan Bantjes, a prominent Voortrekker who likely authored the treaty between the Voortrekkers and the Zulu Kingdom was born in Beaufort West in 1817.
- Sir John Fraser, was born in Beaufort West in the Colony of the Cape of Good Hope in 1840. He later studied medicine at Kings College, Aberdeen. In 1871, he was appointed Private Secretary to Jan Brand, President of the Orange Free State. In 1878 he qualified as an Advocate of the Free State Bar and, after serving as Financial Commissioner of the Free State during the Second Boer War, accepted the Honour of the Knighthood from the British Crown for his reconciliatory role after the conflict.
- Christiaan Barnard, the pioneering heart surgeon, born and bred in Beaufort West. His father, Adam Barnard, was a minister in the Dutch Reformed Mission Church. One of his four brothers, Abraham, died of a heart problem at the age of five. Barnard matriculated from the Beaufort West High School in 1940, and went to study medicine at the University of Cape Town Medical School, where he obtained his MB ChB in 1945. He is commemorated in the local museum.
- Cornelis Johannes Bodenstein, former Vice State President of the South African Republic was born in Beaufort West in 1826.
- Cyril Karabus, former Professor of Paediatrics, University of Cape Town (also FRCP, FRCPE) and head of the Oncology and Haemotology Unit of Red Cross Children's Hospital Cape Town
- Sir John Molteno, the first Prime Minister of the Cape. In his youth, this Anglo-Italian immigrant was a farmer and businessman who opened Beaufort West's first bank.
- Elizabeth Maria Molteno, civil and women's rights activist (and the daughter of John Molteno), was born in Beaufort West.
- Cromwell Everson, the classical music composer and composer of the first Afrikaans opera, was born and grew up in Beaufort West. Gained the basis of his music skills under the piano tutelage of Beckie Karabus (whose husband, Isaac Karabus, was one of the first five Ford agents in South Africa), mother of the jurist, Alan Karabus and doctor, Cyril Karabus
- Mandlenkosi, who fought against the apartheid government and was shot whilst feeding his baby boy (Sira). Mandlenkosi Senior Secondary School is named after him. His name is also present in the township area of Kwa-Mandlenkosi.
- Gert Vlok Nel, the pioneering poet, was born 1963 and grew up in Beaufort-West.
- Antoinette Pienaar (born 1961), is a South African actress, singer, and author.
- Karl Kielblock (1907-1991), author

== Coat of arms ==
By 1931, the town council had assumed a coat of arms — it was depicted on a cigarette card issued in that year.

Coat of arms of Beaufort West

Notes
Granted by the Administrator of the Cape, 10 March 1967
Crest
On a wreath of the colours an Ostrich statant Proper.
Escutcheon
Gules a portcullis with chains pendant all Or.
Supporters
Dexter a merino ram and sinister an angora ram both Proper.
Motto
Festina Lente

== Economy ==
The large uranium and yellowcake producing Beaufort West mine is nearby. The three largest industries in the town are the agricultural sector, which is the largest employer, the transport and logistical support sector, and the tourism sector.

== See also ==
- !Kora Wars
