= Unicorn (disambiguation) =

A unicorn is a mythical horse-like creature, with a horn on its forehead.

Unicorn may also refer to:

== Other fictional entities ==
- Unicorn (Marvel Comics), a supervillain
- Unicorn, a creature in the Advanced Dungeons & Dragons role-playing game
- Unicorn (Tintin), a fictional sailing ship in The Adventures of Tintin comics
- Unicorn, a character in the Canadian animated series Animal Mechanicals

== Animals ==
- Unicorn (spider), a genus of family Oonopidae
- Unicorn fish (disambiguation)
- Giant unicorn, a common name for Elasmotherium, an extinct European rhinoceros
- Unicorn, an old common name for an rhinoceros, rhinoceros unicornis
- Narwhal, a whale known for the unicorn-like tusk on its head

== Astronomy ==
- The Unicorn (black hole)
- Monoceros (constellation), or the Unicorn

== Film and television ==
- The Unicorn (1955 film), a Swedish drama
- The Unicorn (1978 film), a German drama based on the Martin Walser novel
- The Unicorn (2018 film), an American comedy
- The Unicorn (TV series), a 2019 American sitcom
- Unicorns (2023 British film), a drama directed by Sally El Hosaini and James Krishna Floyd
- Unicorns (2023 Spanish film), a drama directed by Àlex Lora
- "The Unicorn", an episode of the TV series Pocoyo

== Literature ==
- The Unicorn (novel), 1963, by Iris Murdoch
- The Unicorn or Das Einhorn, a 1966 novel by Martin Walser

== Military ==
- Opération Licorne (English: Operation Unicorn), a French peacekeeping mission in Côte d'Ivoire
- Licorne, a Russian howitzer
- Operation Unicorn (Scotland), the plan to be enacted in the event of the UK monarch dying in Scotland
- Unicorn APC, a mine-resistant wheeled armoured personnel carrier used by the Sri Lankan military
- HMS Unicorn, any of several British naval vessels
- English ship Unicorn (1634), a 56-gun ship
- USS Unicorn, any of several United States submarines
- UNICORN (United Complex Radio Antenna), a communications antenna fitted with the Japanese Mogami class and New FFM class frigates

== Mountains ==
- Unicorn Mountain, the Selkirks, Canada
- Unicorn Peak, the Cascades, United States

== Music ==
=== Groups ===
- Unicorn (Japanese band), a rock band
- Unicorn (South Korean band), a girl group
- The Unicorns, a band from Montreal, Canada
- Unicorn (English band), a country rock band

=== Albums ===
- Unicorn (Chew Lips album) (2010)
- Unicorn (Tyrannosaurus Rex album) (1969)
- Unicorn (Ugress album) (2008)
- The Unicorn (album), a 1967 folk album by the Irish Rovers
- Unicorn, an album by Teruo Nakamura
- Unicorn, an album by synthwave band Gunship
- Unicornio, a 1983 album by Silvio Rodriguez

=== Songs ===
- "The Unicorn" (song), by Shel Silverstein, made popular by the Irish Rovers
- "Unicorn" (song), by Noa Kirel, the Israeli song for the Eurovision Song Contest 2023
- "Unicorn", a song by Apoptygma Berzerk from Harmonizer
- "Unicorn", a song by Basement Jaxx from Junto

== Sports ==
- Unicorns (cricket team), English, active from 2010 to 2018
- San Francisco Unicorns, an American cricket team
- Hyundai Unicorns, a defunct South Korean baseball franchise
- Schwäbisch Hall Unicorns, a team playing American football in the German Football League
- Kristaps Porziņģis or the Unicorn (born 1995), Latvian basketball player
- The Unicorns, the mascot and athletic teams from the North Carolina School of Science and Mathematics

== Other uses ==
- Unicorn (coin) and half-unicorn, Scottish gold coins
- Unicorn (finance), a privately held startup company above a certain valuation
- Unicorn (web server)
- Honda Unicorn, a motorcycle sold in India
- Unicorn, a fairy chess piece in Raumschach

== See also ==
- Unicorn Academy, a 2023 Netflix animated series
- The Gender Unicorn, a diagram illustrating the spectrums of gender and sexuality
- Unicorn hunting, the practice of searching for a third partner to join a sexual relationship
- Unicorn trend, a 2010s phenomenon of unicorns used as a pop-culture icon
- Eenhoorn (disambiguation), Dutch for "unicorn"
- Einhorn (surname), German for "unicorn"
- Licorne (disambiguation) French for "unicorn"
- Gunicorn or Green Unicorn, web server software based on the Unicorn Project
- Invisible Pink Unicorn, the goddess of a satirical parody religion
- Unicorn-Kanchana, a classical record label
- Unicron, a Transformers character
