= Eenhoorn =

Eenhoorn may refer to:

- Eenhoorn (surname), list of people with the surname
- De Eenhoorn, Haarlem, a paltrok mill in Haarlem, North Holland, Netherlands
- De Eenhoorn (publisher), Flemish independent publishing house

== See also ==
- Unicorn (disambiguation)
- Einhorn (surname)
