= Operation Unicorn =

Operation Unicorn may refer to:

- Opération Licorne (English: Operation Unicorn), a French peacekeeping operation in Côte d'Ivoire
- Opération Licorne (English: Operation Unicorn), a French nuclear test in French Polynesia; see Fangataufa
- Operation Unicorn (Scotland), a supporting plan for Operation London Bridge being enacted following the death of Elizabeth II in Scotland

== See also ==
- Unicorn (disambiguation)
