= Eenhoorn (surname) =

Eenhoorn is a surname. Notable people with the surname include:

- Bas Eenhoorn (born 1946), Dutch politician
- Paul Eenhoorn (1948–2022), Australian actor
- Robert Eenhoorn (born 1968), Dutch baseball player and sports administrator

== See also ==
- Einhorn (surname), German for unicorn
- Unicorn (disambiguation)
