= Orchestina longipes =

Scientific classification
- Kingdom: Animalia
- Phylum: Arthropoda
- Subphylum: Chelicerata
- Class: Arachnida
- Order: Araneae
- Infraorder: Araneomorphae
- Family: Oonopidae
- Genus: Orchestina
- Species: O. longipes

Binomial name
- Orchestina longipes Dalmas, 1922

Species of spider

Orchestina longipes is a spider species found in Italy, France, Spain, and Portugal.
