= Orchestina ebriola =

Scientific classification
- Kingdom: Animalia
- Phylum: Arthropoda
- Subphylum: Chelicerata
- Class: Arachnida
- Order: Araneae
- Infraorder: Araneomorphae
- Family: Oonopidae
- Genus: Orchestina
- Species: O. ebriola

Binomial name
- Orchestina ebriola Brignoli, 1972

Species of spider

Orchestina ebriola is a spider species found in Greece.
