= Frappuccino =

Starbucks iced coffee drink

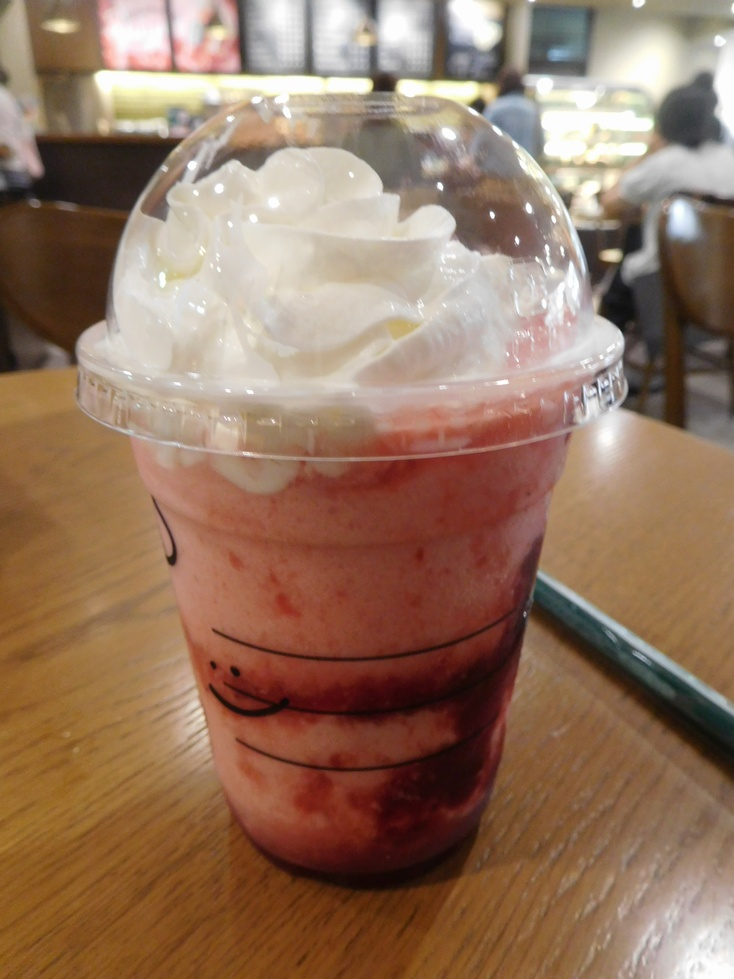
- Strawberry Creme Frappuccino
- Product type: Blended coffee
- Current owner: Starbucks
- Country: United States
- Introduced: 1995; 31 years ago
- Related brands: Iced coffee, milkshake
- Website: starbucks.com/frappuccino

Frappuccino is a line of blended iced coffee drinks sold by Starbucks. It may consist of coffee or coffee-free base, blended with ice and ingredients such as flavored syrups and usually topped with whipped cream and/or spices. It may also include blended Starbucks refreshers. Frappuccinos are also sold as bottled coffee beverages in grocery stores, convenience stores and from vending machines.

== History ==
Frappuccino is a portmanteau of "frappe" (pronounced /fræp/)—the New England name for a thick milkshake with ice cream, derived from the French term lait frappé ('beaten milk')—and "cappuccino", an espresso coffee with frothed milk.

The Frappuccino was originally developed, trademarked, and sold by George Howell's Eastern Massachusetts coffee shop chain the Coffee Connection, and created and named by his marketing director, Andrew Frank. When Starbucks purchased the Coffee Connection in 1994, it gained the rights to use, make, market, and sell the Frappuccino drink. The drink, with a different recipe, was introduced under the Starbucks name in 1995. In 2012, Starbucks had annual Frappuccino sales of over $2 billion.

== Recipe ==
The recipe is derived from a fusion of various cold drinks, including the "coffee frap" (similar to iced coffee) and the "frappe" (blended ice cream, syrup, and milk), with the Italian cappuccino. The recipe consists of an instant coffee mix, ice, an emulsifying agent such as xanthan gum, and other additives such as milk, sugar, flavored syrups, and whipped cream.

== Versions ==
=== Available ===
List of typical versions available of each type of Frappuccino:

==== Decaffeinated ====
Upon consumer request, decaf espresso can be used in place of the standard instant coffee mix.

==== Crème ====
A coffee-free base was created to make a drink called a Frappuccino Blended Crème. Menu examples include the Mocha Crème, Vanilla Bean Crème, Strawberry Crème, Matcha Crème, and Chai Crème. All Frappuccino menu items can come as a Crème based Frappuccino, occasionally under slightly different names such as the Chocolate Cookie Crumble instead of the Mocha Cookie Crumble. Any syrup or sauce can be used to make a custom Frappuccino Blended Crème. Crème Frappuccinos contain very little or no caffeine.

==== Non-dairy alternatives ====
Frappuccinos made with soy milk became available in the United States and Canada in 2010. In January 2011, Starbucks introduced the option to Australian stores, and it has since been made available in other countries. Starbucks also introduced coconut, almond, and oat milk options in 2021.

==== Affogato-style ====
Frappuccinos can be ordered "affogato-style" which involves pouring a shot of hot espresso over the top of the drink, which modifies coffee content and results in a more bold flavor.

==== Additional Modifications ====
Saffron-pistachio-based, Indian-inspired Frappuccino at Starbucks outlet

Frappuccinos may include additional ingredients, which can include espresso shots, flavored syrups, "Frappuccino chips" (which are similar to chocolate chips), and flavored powders. Consumers may also customize the consistency of Frappuccinos by ordering light or extra ice. Any Frappuccino can have additional syrups, shots of espresso, or various other modifications at a possible surcharge.

=== Discontinued ===
==== Juice blends ====
In the summer of 2006, Starbucks introduced Frappuccino Juice Blends, which were described as being "real fruit juices combined with Tazo Tea, blended with ice." Juice Blends were gradually discontinued throughout 2007 and 2008 and are no longer offered by Starbucks.

==== Frappuccino Light ====
Previously, Frappuccinos were orderable as "light." The light Frappuccino was an alternative to the coffee Frappuccino, made using a low-sugar Frappuccino base and nonfat milk, and typically served without whipped cream. The light Frappuccino has been discontinued as of 2013.

==== Seasonal Limited Editions ====
Drinks such as the Unicorn, Frankenstein, Red Velvet Cake Cream, Cherry Blossom, and Zombie Frappuccinos were all seasonal limited edition offerings. The release of these Frappuccinos began in April 2017 and ran through 2018. Each Frappuccino was available only for a short period of time, as the ingredients were produced in relatively low quantities.

== Bottled Frappuccino ==
Bottled Frappuccinos are sold in retail stores and vending machines. The 9.5-US-fluid-ounce (280 ml) bottled version was originally manufactured in 1996. Starbucks offers 19 different bottled Frappuccino flavors including Mocha, Vanilla, Coffee, Toasted White Chocolate Mocha, Pumpkin Spice, and Caramel. The bottled Frappuccino comes in two package sizes, including 13.7 US fluid ounces (410 ml) and 9.5 US fluid ounces (280 ml).

== North American Coffee Partnership ==
In 1994, PepsiCo and Starbucks formed an entity called the North American Coffee Partnership. The joint venture was created so that ready-to-drink products using the Starbucks name could be distributed using Pepsi's global network. The Frappuccino was the joint venture's first product.

== High Sugar and Fat Content ==
The Frappuccino beverages contain a high level of sugar. A 16 US fl oz (470 ml), or "grande", beverage has significantly more than the 36 or 32 grams of sugar that the American Heart Association suggests that men or women, respectively, should have in a day. For example, a grande Sugar Cookie Almondmilk Frappuccino contains 58 grams of sugar, a grande Matcha Creme Frappuccino has 61 grams, and a grande Pumpkin Spice Frappuccino has 65 grams.

The Frappuccino also contains large amounts of fat. The Unicorn Frappuccino, for example, contains 16 grams of fat.

== See also ==
- The Coffee Connection
- Coffee milk
