= Pedipalp =

Appendage of chelicerate

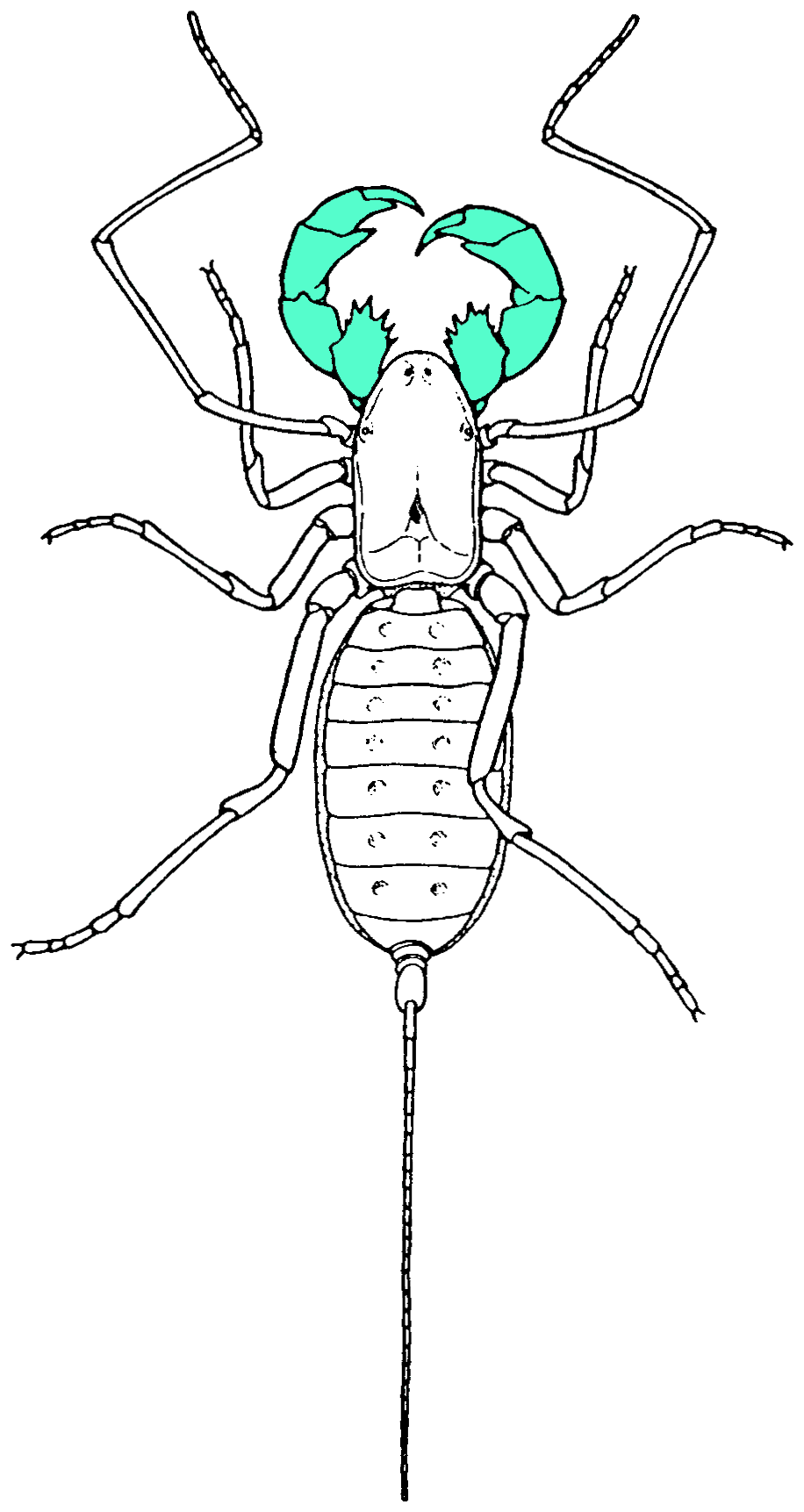
Blue-shaded pedipalps in an illustrated dorsal view of a whip scorpion

Pedipalps (commonly shortened to palps or palpi) are the secondary pair of forward appendages among chelicerates – a group of arthropods including spiders, scorpions, horseshoe crabs, and sea spiders. The pedipalps are lateral to the chelicerae ("jaws") and anterior to the first pair of walking legs.

== Overview ==
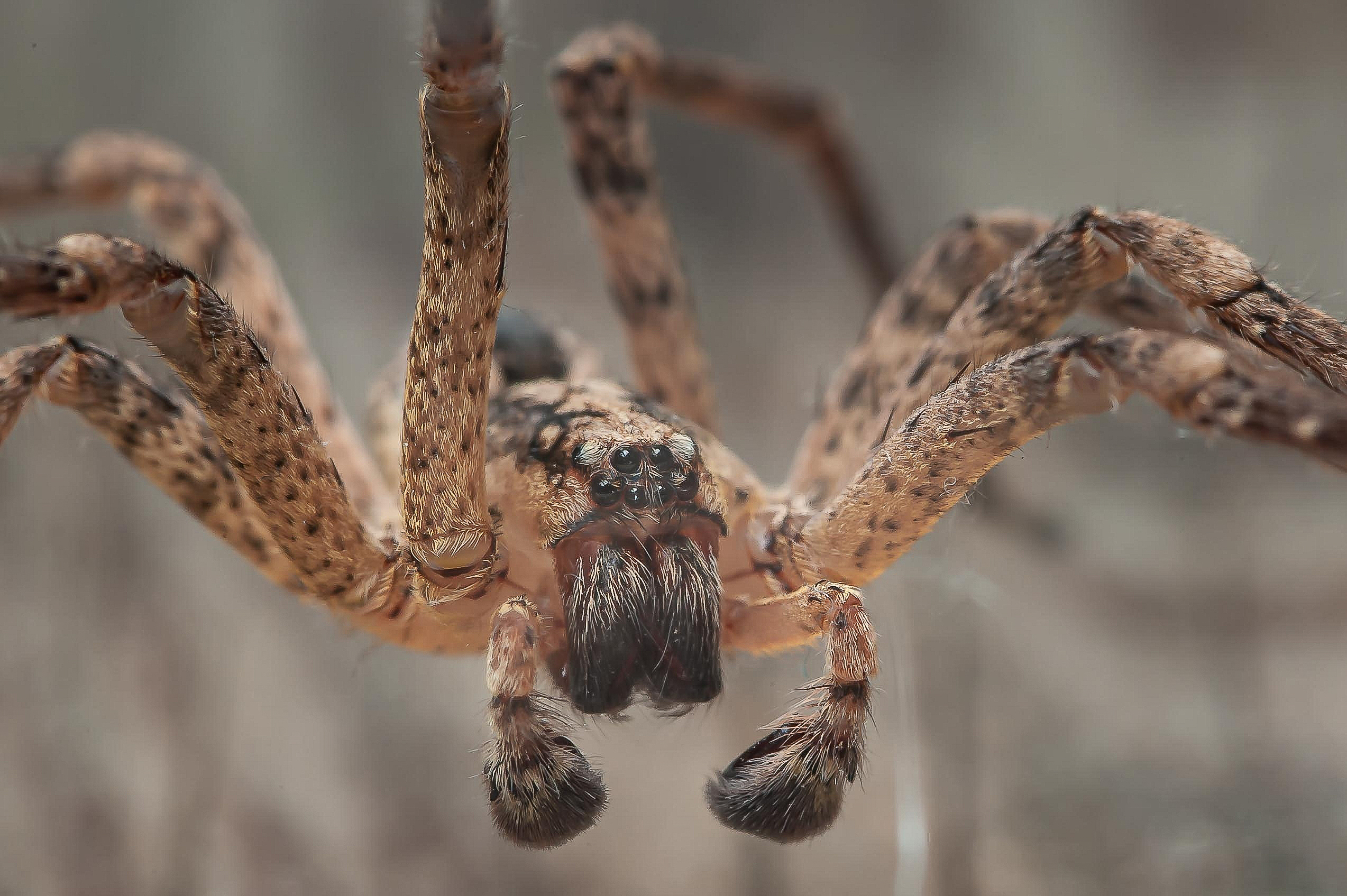
Male Zoropsis spinimana showing enlarged pedipalps

Pedipalps are composed of six segments or articles. From the proximal end (where they are attached to the body) to the distal, they are: the coxa, the trochanter, the femur, the short patella, the tibia, and the tarsus. In spiders, the coxae frequently have extensions called maxillae, which function as mouth parts with or without some contribution from the coxae of the anterior legs. The limbs themselves may be simple tactile organs outwardly resembling the legs, as in spiders, or chelate weapons (pincers) of great size, as in scorpions. The pedipalps of Solifugae are covered in setae, but have not been studied in detail.

Comparative studies of pedipalpal morphology may suggest that leg-like pedipalps are primitive in arachnids. At present, the only reasonable alternative to this view is to assume that xiphosurans reflect the morphology of the primitive arachnid pedipalp and to conclude that this appendage is primitively chelate. Pedipalps are traditionally thought to be homologous with mandibles in crustaceans and insects, although more recent studies (e.g. using Hox genes) suggest they are probably homologous with the crustacean second antennae.

== Chelate pedipalps ==
Chelate or sub-chelate (pincer-like) pedipalps are found in several arachnid groups (Ricinulei, Uropygi, scorpions and pseudoscorpions) but the chelae in most of these groups may not be homologous with those found in Xiphosura. The pedipalps are distinctly raptorial (i.e., modified for seizing prey) in the Amblypygi, Uropygi, Schizomida, and some Opiliones belonging to the laniatorid group.

== Spider pedipalps ==
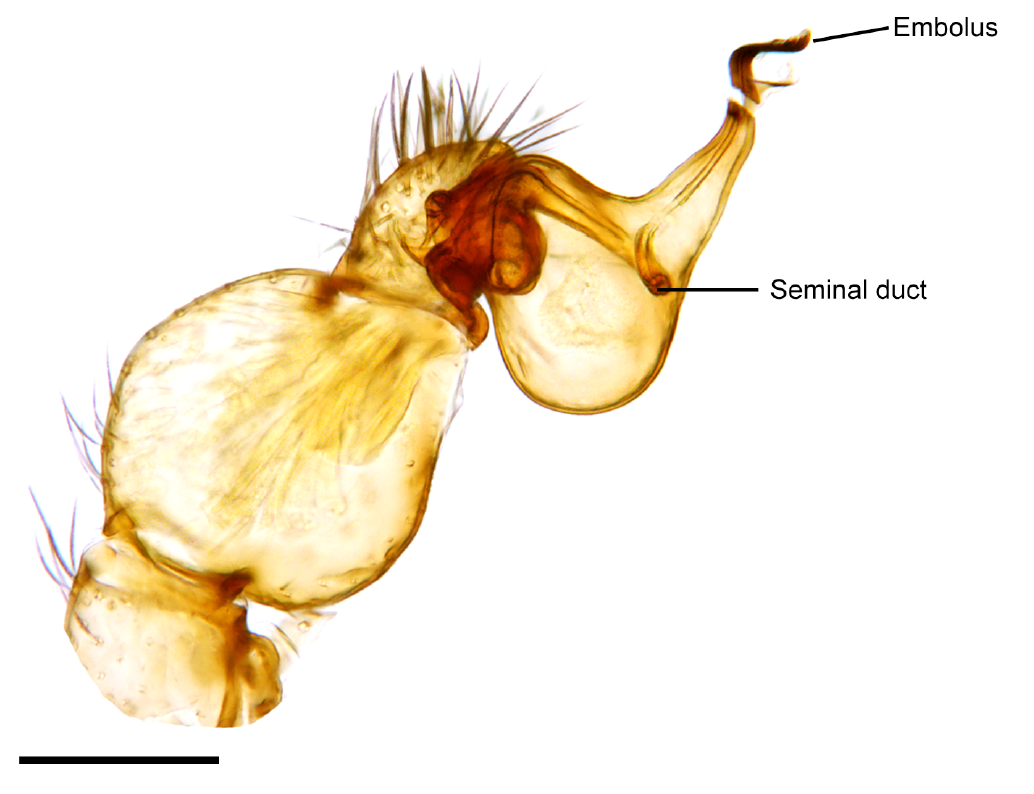
Palpal or copulatory bulb of Unicorn catleyi

Pedipalps of spiders have the same segmentation as the legs, but the tarsus is undivided, and the pretarsus has no lateral claws. Pedipalps contain sensitive chemical detectors and function as taste and smell organs, supplementing those on the legs. In sexually mature male spiders, the final segment of the pedipalp, the tarsus, develops a complicated structure (sometimes called the palpal bulb or palpal organ) that is used to transfer sperm to the female seminal receptacles during mating. The details of this structure vary considerably between different groups of spiders and are useful for identifying species. The pedipalps are also used by male spiders in courtship displays, contributing to vibratory patterns in web-shaking, acoustic signals, or visual displays.

The cymbium is a spoon-shaped structure located at the end of the spider pedipalp that supports the palpal organ. The cymbium may also be used as a stridulatory organ in spider courtship.

The embolus is a narrow whip-like or leaf-like extension of the palpal bulb.
