= Einhorn =

Einhorn is German for unicorn. It is also used as a surname. Notable people with the surname include:

- Alfred Einhorn (1938–1917), German biochemist, inventor of procaine (Novocain)
- David Einhorn (rabbi), German rabbi
- David Einhorn (hedge fund manager), American hedge fund manager
- Dov Berish Einhorn, Polish rabbi
- Eddie Einhorn, American part owner of the Chicago White Sox baseball team
- Edward Einhorn, American theater director, playwright, and novelist
- Ephraim Einhorn (1918–2021), British rabbi based in Taiwan
- Ira Einhorn, also known as the "Unicorn Killer"
- Itamar Einhorn (born 1997), Israeli Olympic cyclist
- Jerzy Einhorn, Polish-born Swedish oncologist and politician, Holocaust survivor
- Jessica Einhorn, Dean of the Paul H. Nitze School of Advanced International Studies
- Joseph Einhorn, American entrepreneur
- Lawrence Einhorn, American oncologist
- Lena Einhorn (born 1954), Swedish director, writer and physician
- Martin B. Einhorn (born 1942), American theoretical physicist
- Max Einhorn (1862–1953), Polish American gastroenterologist and inventor
- Nina Einhorn (1925–2002), Polish-born Swedish medical researcher, Holocaust survivor
- Paul Einhorn, Latvian historian
- Randall Einhorn, American cinematographer
- Richard Einhorn, American composer
- Stefan Einhorn (born 1955), Swedish doctor, professor and writer
- Trevor Einhorn, American actor

== In fiction ==
- Lois Einhorn, a character in Ace Ventura: Pet Detective

== See also ==
- Unicorn (disambiguation)
- Eenhoorn (disambiguation), Dutch for unicorn
