= George Howell (entrepreneur) =

American specialty-coffee retailer and consultant

George Howell (born 1945) is an American entrepreneur and one of the pioneers of the specialty-coffee movement in the early 1970s.

== Early life ==
Born and raised in New Jersey, Howell's family moved to Mexico City when he was 13. He studied art history, French, and Spanish literature at Yale University from 1964 to 1967, when he dropped out.

== Career ==
In 1974, Howell and his wife Laurie moved to Boston. After having lived in Berkeley, California, for a time, Howell said, "In 1974 we [decided] to leave the West Coast, I already had two kids with another on the way. We decided to move east to Boston. We drove cross-country. I took with me some whole bean coffee and a grinder. We stopped at the various Howard Johnson’s that were on the interstates on our way and I would go into men’s room, grind the coffee there, leaving it smelling a whole lot better than when I walked in, and then I would take out my French press on the counter, ask for hot water for 35 cents and make my French press at the Howard Johnson’s counter. And within minutes I would always have several people around me wondering what that was, and this is before I even had any clue that I would get into a coffee business."

=== Coffee Connection ===
In 1975, Howell founded the Coffee Connection, a coffee shop and retailer in Cambridge, Massachusetts, which was a pioneer in third wave coffee. It expanded to 23 locations in the Northeast. It was acquired by Starbucks Corporation for $23 million in 1994 (equivalent to $50 million in 2025), and formed the nexus of their expansion into the Boston area. With the acquisition, Starbucks acquired the rights to use the name Frappuccino for a popular blended iced coffee drink, which Starbucks reformulated.

In 2012, Howell founded George Howell Coffee. Its first location was in Newtonville, Massachusetts, and as of 2026 it is a mini-chain with five locations in the Boston area.

=== Professional activities ===
In 1997, Howell was invited to become a quality consultant to Brazil as part of the Gourmet Project, a 2-year initiative set up by the United Nations’ International Trade Center (ITC) and the International Coffee Organization (ICO), which influenced the creation of the Cup of Excellence competition.

In 1996, Howell received the Specialty Coffee Association of America's Lifetime Achievement Award.
