= Orchestina pavesii =

Scientific classification
- Kingdom: Animalia
- Phylum: Arthropoda
- Subphylum: Chelicerata
- Class: Arachnida
- Order: Araneae
- Infraorder: Araneomorphae
- Family: Oonopidae
- Genus: Orchestina
- Species: O. pavesii

Binomial name
- Orchestina pavesii (Simon, 1873)

Synonyms
- Schoenobates pavesii Simon, 1873

Species of spider

Orchestina pavesii is a spider species found in Spain, Slovakia, Bulgaria, Algeria, Canary Islands, Egypt and Yemen.
