= Licorne (disambiguation) =

Licorne is French for unicorn.

It may also refer to:

== Military ==
- Licorne (Russian: Единорог, romanized: Yedinorog, lit. 'unicorn'), a Russian muzzle-loading field gun
- Opération Licorne (English: Operation Unicorn), a 21st-century French peacekeeping operation in Côte d'Ivoire
- Opération Licorne (English: Operation Unicorn), a 1970 French nuclear test in French Polynesia, using the Licorne nuclear test device bomb; see Fangataufa#History
- French ship Licorne, several ships of the French Navy

== Places ==
- Rivière de la Licorne (English: Unicorn River), Saguenay-Lac-Saint-Jean, Quebec, Canada
- Stade de la Licorne (English: Unicorn Stadium), a soccer stadium in Amiens, France
- La Licorne (English: The Unicorn), Le Plateau-Mont-Royal, Montreal, Quebec, Canada; a theatre

== Other uses ==
- "Licorne" (sculpture), a hood ornament designed by François Bazin (sculptor)
- La Licorne (English: The Unicorn), a 1940s French literary magazine
- Les Licornes (English: The Unicorns), a soccer club in Amiens, France
- Corre La Licorne, later becoming Licorne, a French automaker
- Unicorn (Tintin) (French: La Licorne), a fictional ship from the French-language Belgian comic book Tintin

== See also ==
- Unicorn (disambiguation)
