= Unicorn Frappuccino =

Starbucks drink introduced in 2017

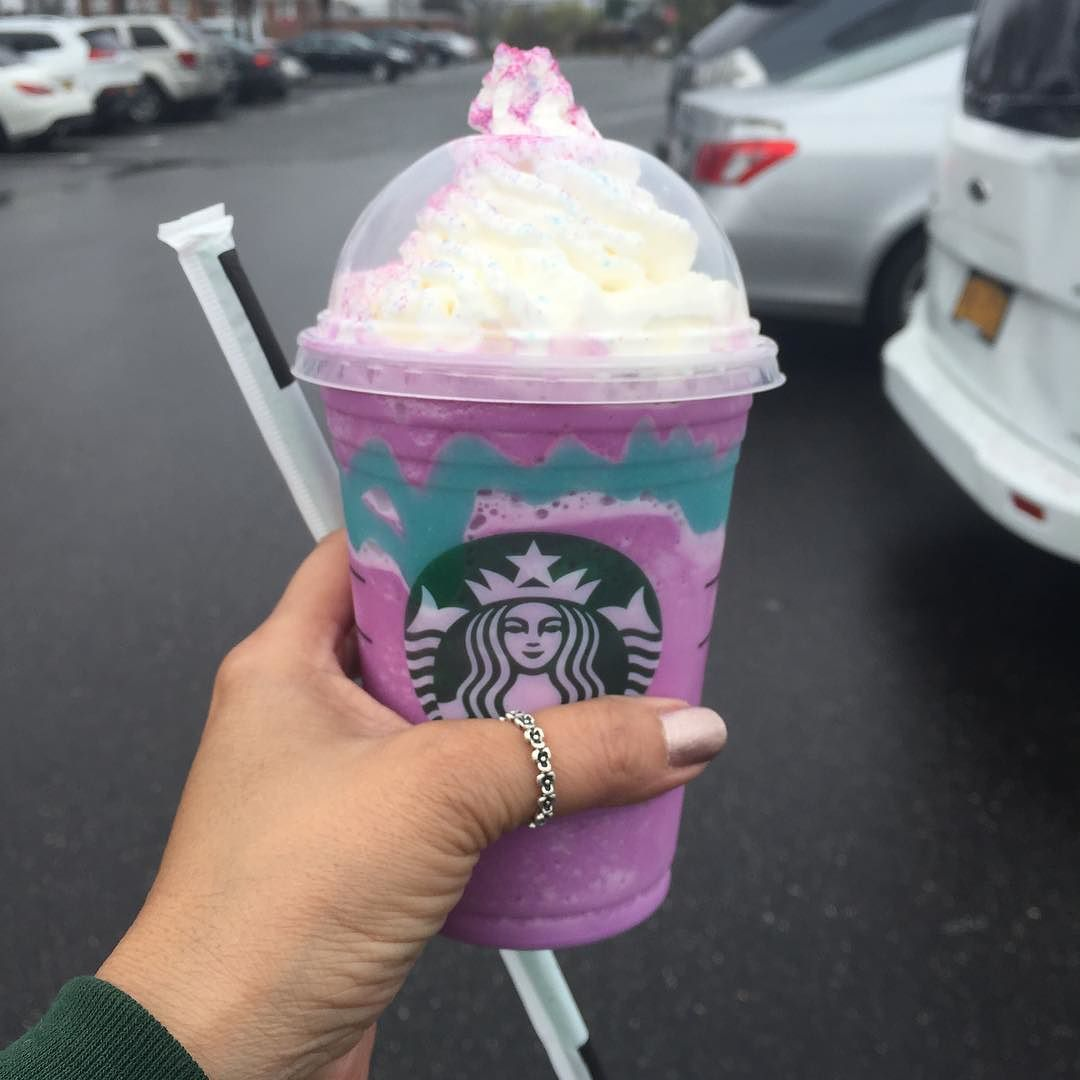
- A Unicorn Frappuccino pictured in 2017
- Type: Créme Frappuccino
- Manufacturer: Starbucks
- Distributor: Starbucks
- Origin: United States
- Introduced: April 19, 2017; August 15, 2026 (return)
- Discontinued: April 23, 2017; August 16, 2026 (return): US: August 16, 2026; PL: August 17, 2026
- Colour: Purple
- Flavour: Mango

The Unicorn Frappuccino was a viral drink released by Starbucks in April 2017. The drink, a créme frappuccino, released in select stores in North America. It was made with mango flavored syrup, pink and blue sour powders, ice, milk and whipped cream.

The drink was released as part of the social media-fueled embrace of the unicorn in 2017. It was described online as color-changing, vibrant and flavor-shifting. In April 2026, Starbucks announced that the Unicorn Frappuccino would return during the Coachella 2026 music festival. Following this, in June 2026 the company announced the drink would make a worldwide return in late summer 2026.

== Reception ==
Due to the high publicity of the drink, many social media users had opinions about parts of the drink, such as the flavor and nutritional facts. These reactions encouraged more interest from viewers and sparked concern from health-focused peers and institutions. Notable reactions included food reviewer and critic Anthony Bourdain stating "Wow, that's like four things I hate [...] It's the perfect nexus of awfulness." when asked about his feeling on the newly released drink in an interview with Town & Country Magazine.

Another celebrity reaction that created a public moment was a viral video of singer Katy Perry spitting out the drink in an Instagram story with the caption "I couldn't handle drinking my own blood". Additional reactions from baristas ranting online about the intense demand for the limited edition drink combined with the labor intensive process of creating the drink and the many complex ingredients spread across the internet.

The Unicorn Frappuccino was criticized by the Stratford Health Department for having too much sugar. The drink, containing 59 grams of sugar, was well above the American Heart Association's recommendation 25g of sugar a day for women, and 36g for men.

== 2026 rerelease ==
On April 1, 2026 Starbucks announced the return of the Unicorn Frappuccino, sold exclusively at Coachella 2026. This partnership and return was part of a larger marketing effort announced in August 2024 after the hiring of new Chief Executive Officer, Brian Niccol. By capitalizing on nostalgia and comfort, this campaign focused on bringing Starbucks back to its simple coffeehouse roots. Starbucks's efforts to collaborate with a major music festival and reviving the Unicorn Frappuccino was stated as a way of "returning to relevancy" by Nation's Restaurant News' Executive Editor, Alicia Kelso.

In June 2026, the company announced that the drink would be making a return to stores globally for one weekend in 2026.

== See also ==
- Unicorn food
