= Orchestina simoni =

Scientific classification
- Kingdom: Animalia
- Phylum: Arthropoda
- Subphylum: Chelicerata
- Class: Arachnida
- Order: Araneae
- Infraorder: Araneomorphae
- Family: Oonopidae
- Genus: Orchestina
- Species: O. simoni

Binomial name
- Orchestina simoni Dalmas, 1916

Species of spider

Orchestina simoni is a spider species found in France, Italy, Greece, Portugal, and Turkey.
