= Chew Lips =

English dance-pop trio

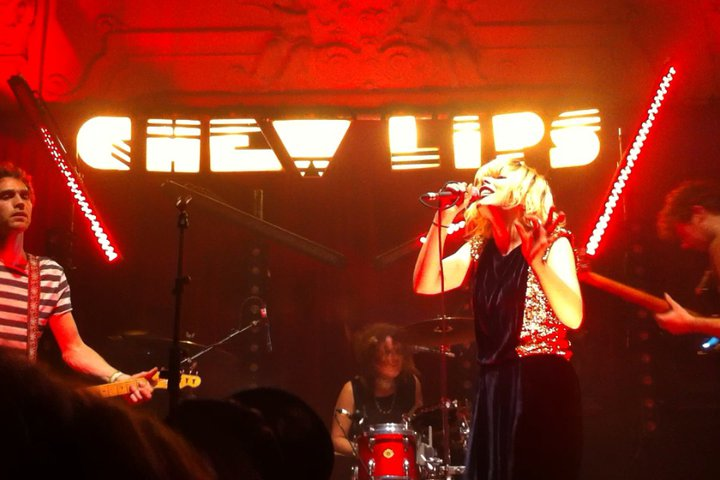
- Chew Lips performing live in 2011

Background information
- Origin: East London, UK
- Genres: Indie, electro, synthpop, drone, dance-punk
- Years active: 2008–2014
- Label: Family
- Members: 'Tigs' (Alicia Huertas), James Watkins, Will Sanderson
- Website: www.chew-lips.com

Chew Lips was an English indie dance-pop trio, formed in spring of 2008. It consisted of singer Alicia 'Tigs' Huertas and multi-instrumentalists James Watkins and Will Sanderson.

== Career ==
Huertas, Watkins and Sanderson formed Chew Lips as a three-piece band in London in the summer of 2008. They came to the attention of the French record label Kitsuné, which released their debut single "Solo" in March 2009. The single sold out quickly, and received critical acclaim in the indie blogosphere, with Pitchfork calling the track "classic, pristine", and The Fly magazine labelling it "one of the most magnificent debuts of the year". Kitsuné released the band's second single, "Salt Air", in July 2009, described by NME as "an addictive slice of heart-wrenching disco-pop".

In summer 2009, the band began working on their full-length debut album Unicorn, with Bat For Lashes collaborator David Kosten. The album was self-released in January 2010, to positive reviews from the BBC, NME, and a 4/5 review in The Guardian. They subsequently embarked on a period of touring, including several European festivals and an appearance at SXSW in Texas, where they were described by Elle US as the best new act at the festival. They also headlined the BBC Introducing Stage at Glastonbury Festival.

The band's other live appearances included support slots with The Killers, Delphic, We Are Scientists, The Virgins, Joy Formidable, Howling Bells, as well as three UK tours and a European tour in 2011.

Huertas announced on Twitter in 2015 that she was now only writing material for other artists, implying that Chew Lips had disbanded.

== Discography ==
=== Studio albums ===
Album details	Release date	Label
Unicorn	25 January 2010	Family

=== Singles and EPs ===
Release Details	Release date	Label
Solo	January 2009	Kitsuné
Salt Air	6 July 2009	Kitsuné
Play Together	18 January 2010	Family
Karen	28 March 2010	Family
Do You Chew?	4 May 2012	Sony
Hurricane	3 September 2012	Sony
