= Orchestina pilifera =

Scientific classification
- Kingdom: Animalia
- Phylum: Arthropoda
- Subphylum: Chelicerata
- Class: Arachnida
- Order: Araneae
- Infraorder: Araneomorphae
- Family: Oonopidae
- Genus: Orchestina
- Species: O. pilifera

Binomial name
- Orchestina pilifera Dalmas, 1916

Species of spider

Orchestina pilifera, is a species of spider of the genus Orchestina. It is endemic to Sri Lanka.
