= Orchestina dentifera =

Scientific classification
- Kingdom: Animalia
- Phylum: Arthropoda
- Subphylum: Chelicerata
- Class: Arachnida
- Order: Araneae
- Infraorder: Araneomorphae
- Family: Oonopidae
- Genus: Orchestina
- Species: O. dentifera

Binomial name
- Orchestina dentifera Simon, 1893

Species of spider

Orchestina dentifera is a species of spider of the genus Orchestina. It is endemic to Sri Lanka.
