= Fancy.com =

Social photo sharing webstore

Fancy
- Company type: Private
- Website type: Social network service, microblogging, ecommerce
- Available in: Multilingual
- Headquarters: New York City, United States
- Area served: Worldwide
- Owner: Raptor
- Founder: Joseph Einhorn
- Key people: Greg Spillane (CEO); Francois-Henri Pinault (Board Member); Chris Hughes (Board Member); Jack Dorsey (Board Member); Jim Pallotta (Board Member)
- Industry: Internet, Ecommerce, Consumer Goods
- Products: Men's, Women's, Kids, Pets, Home, Gadgets, Art, Food, Media, Architecture, Sports, Travel destinations, DIY, Workspace, Cars, Other
- Employees: 26-50 (2013)
- Website: www.fancy.com
- Registration: Required to post, follow, or be followed
- Users: 2 million (October 2012)
- Launched: 2009
- Current status: Closed

Fancy was a social photo sharing webstore and mobile app which allowed users to engage in socially oriented shopping through picture feeds and sharing. Users could purchase products that they see directly from the website, which acted as an intermediary between the consumer and the retailer. Fancy was created by Joseph Einhorn and was based in New York City.

== History ==
Thingd is the parent company of Fancy. Thingd is short for “Thing daemon”. In a 2010 TechCrunch article, CEO Joseph Einhorn summarized the company's mission by stating that, “we want to build a database of everything in the world.” Thingd aims to be the object layer on the web, the platform that identifies images and collects metadata around everything from Gucci sunglasses to comic book collectibles.

Fancy was originally set up as “an invitation-only photo blog where more than 5,000 tastemakers and celebrities upload and tag images of their possessions, as well as the baubles they'd like to own”. It then opened to the public.

In October 2012, comScore announced that Fancy had grown 25% since its launch and was estimated to be worth US$100 million. In February 2013, Fancy acquired the online artisanal foods' vendor Samplrs.com and partnered with Google+ to offer a purchase experience similar to Facebook's Gifts.

Fancy purchased Fancy.com in June 2013 and the company was subsequently rebranded from "The Fancy" to "Fancy." Fancy's valuation reached about $600 million when it received $53 million in funding, according to a July 2013 Bloomberg report. In February 2014, Olivia Palermo, with Fancy, started an e-commerce website. In February 2015, Fancy raised a $20 million Series D strategic funding round, which was led by Mexico's Carlos Slim Domit and the CCC holding company.

In November 2020, Fancy raised money from supporters via crowdfunding site WeFunder.

== Description ==
Fancy users had to install a bookmarklet in their web browsers to share internet content directly on Fancy, or could publish content directly into their feed. Users would follow each other based on their tastes. Badges could be earned. The Fancy user base was split relatively 50-50 between Indian and International users.

There is no advertising on Fancy. External merchants could build their store and sell their products on the site. Brands and retailers bid to sell items that are fancied. The seller then sets a price based on the demand, or number of fancies, that an item has. After Fancy approves the item, users can then make their transaction on the website. In return for selling other merchants’ products, Fancy takes a small commission of every purchase that is made through the website.

== Features ==
=== Fancy Box ===
Fancy Box is a monthly subscription service in which users pay $39 to receive a box full of different products available from Fancy, worth an estimated total of $80 or more. Fancy allows for boxes to be customized by category, such as men's, women's, home, gadgets, media, and more.

=== Gifting ===
Fancy helps users find gift ideas through their “Gift” tab. Users can either send a Fancy Box worth $60, or browse for gift ideas by color or price, ranging from $1–20 to gifts $500+. Fancy also offers Gift Guides such as Back to School, For Him, Anniversary, and Winter Getaways. Lastly, users can view “Recommendations” for gifts by sending in a customized description of what they desire, and the individual designated to receive the gift.

=== Promotions ===
Users receive a credit of $1 for every friend that signs up, and $10 when that friend buys something within 60 days.

Fancy has also partnered with American Express to promote its site. Through October 31, 2012, Amex gives a $20 statement credit for every $100 spent on Fancy, and paid for by using an Amex credit card. The card must be synced with Twitter; a tweet must be sent using #AmexTheFancyOffer, and a tweet validating the offer must be received from @amexsync before receiving the credit.

Starting from July 9, 2012, Fancy started offering cash rewards to users who share the stuff they love. Anytime that users share a product that they fancy, they will receive a referral link. Whenever someone clicks on their referral link and makes a purchase, the original user who posted the referral link will get a 2 percent cut in the form of credit in his/her account. Fancy created a dashboard that is specifically designed for users to keep track of all the earnings that were made through referral links. Founder Joseph Einhorn expressed in an interview with VentureBeat that "the goal is to evolve the way social commerce operates". He added that the company wants "to reward the users who create value for us by curating favorite items and helping others to discover great new things".

== Finances ==
=== Funding ===
On June 9, 2009, Fancy received a combined $2 million from angel investors Jim Pallotta (board member and owner of the Boston Celtics), Esther Dyson, and Allen & Company. In May 2010, Fancy completed its Series A round which amassed a total of $6 million from various investors, including Art Samberg, Jeff Samberg, Maynard Webb, Bob Pittman, Twitter creator Jack Dorsey (board member), and Facebook co-founder Chris Hughes (board member).

Fancy secured a $10 million investment in November 2011 from Pinault-Printemps-Redoute, bringing the company's valuation to $100 million.

In July 2013 Fancy closed a $53 million funding round from, among others, American Express, Len Blavatnik, and Will Smith. The funding brought the company's estimated value to $600 million.

In September 2013 Fancy secured an investment round of $7 million from, among others, Richard C. Perry, owner of Barneys New York, and his son David Perry, who works at Fancy.

In February 2015, Fancy raised a $20 million Series D strategic funding round which was led by Mexico's Carlos Slim Domit and the CCC holding company. Fancy noted that it would use the funding to "continue to build out its technology platform and execute on new key strategic partnerships”.

=== Acquisitions ===
As of August 2012, Apple was in talks to acquire Fancy. Apple wanted to secure a role for themselves in the growing e-commerce market. Although there is no guarantee that the acquisition will happen and the price that Apple proposed to pay for Fancy is unknown. Apple is not known for making "big, splashy acquisitions" but Fancy could give Apple a "clear route to converting people's interest in an object into a sale". The acquisition was never completed.
