= Orchestina elegans =

Scientific classification
- Kingdom: Animalia
- Phylum: Arthropoda
- Subphylum: Chelicerata
- Class: Arachnida
- Order: Araneae
- Infraorder: Araneomorphae
- Family: Oonopidae
- Genus: Orchestina
- Species: O. elegans

Binomial name
- Orchestina elegans Simon, 1893

Species of spider

Orchestina elegans is a species of spiders in the family Oonopidae. It is found in the Philippines.
