= Unicorn (Chew Lips album) =

Studio album by Chew Lips
- Released: 25 January 2010
- Recorded: 2008–2009
- Genre: Electronic, dance-pop, indie
- Length: 34:50
- Label: Indie Europe/Zoom

Singles from Unicorn
- 1. "Play Together" Released: 17 January 2010; 2. "Karen" Released: 28 March 2010

Professional ratings
Aggregate scores
Source	Rating
Metacritic	77/100
Review scores
Source	Rating
PopMatters	6/10 stars

Unicorn is the debut album by British indie dance-pop trio Chew Lips. It was released on 25 January 2010.

== Track listing ==
1. "Eight" – 3:08
2. "Play Together" – 2:37
3. "Slick" – 4:36
4. "Karen" – 3:31
5. "Too Much Talking" – 3:52
6. "Toro" – 2:48
7. "Two Years" – 2:43
8. "Seven" – 3:17
9. "Two Hands" – 2:38
10. "Gold Key" – 3:27
11. "Piano Song" – 2:13
