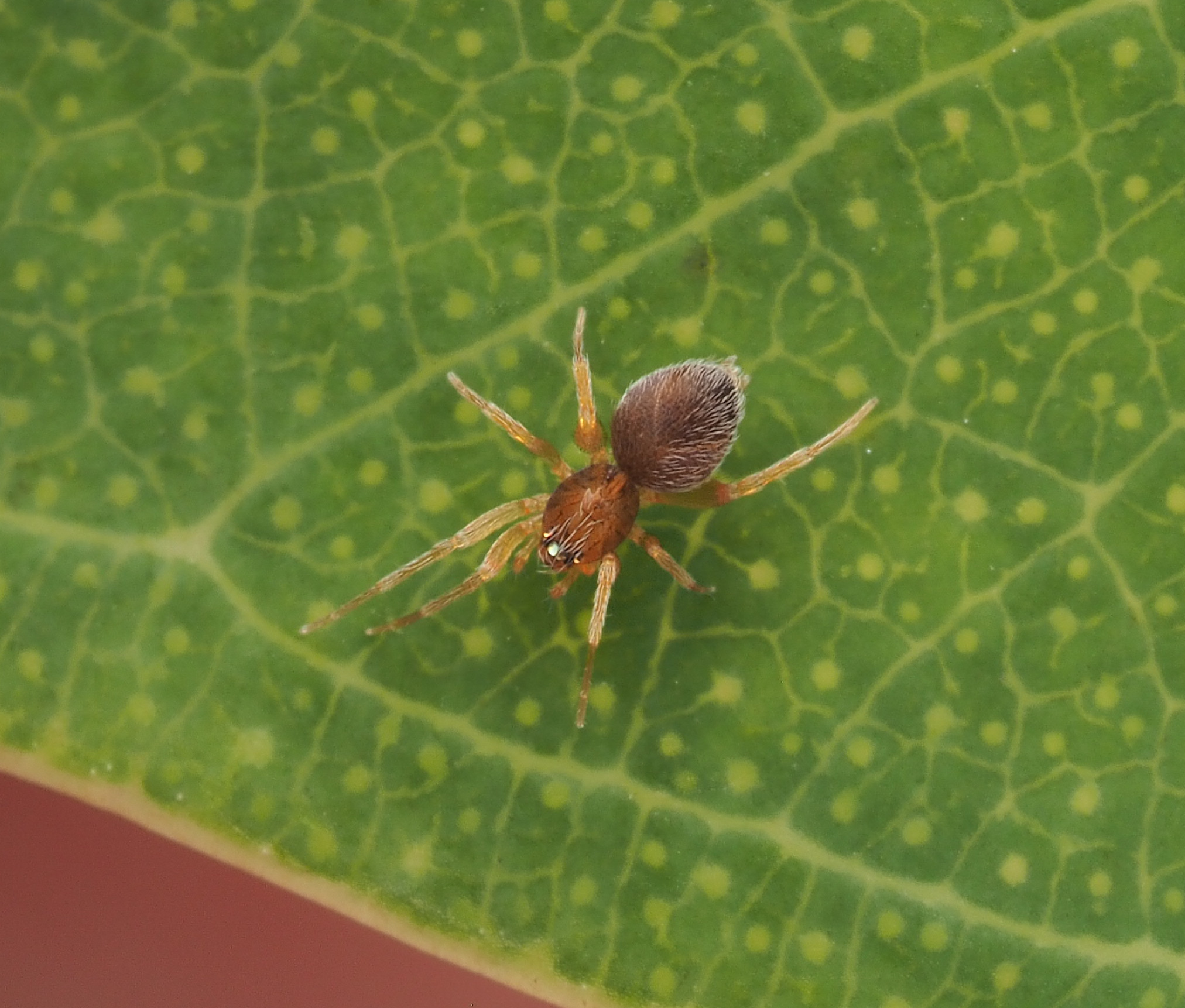
- Orchestina sp. from Australia
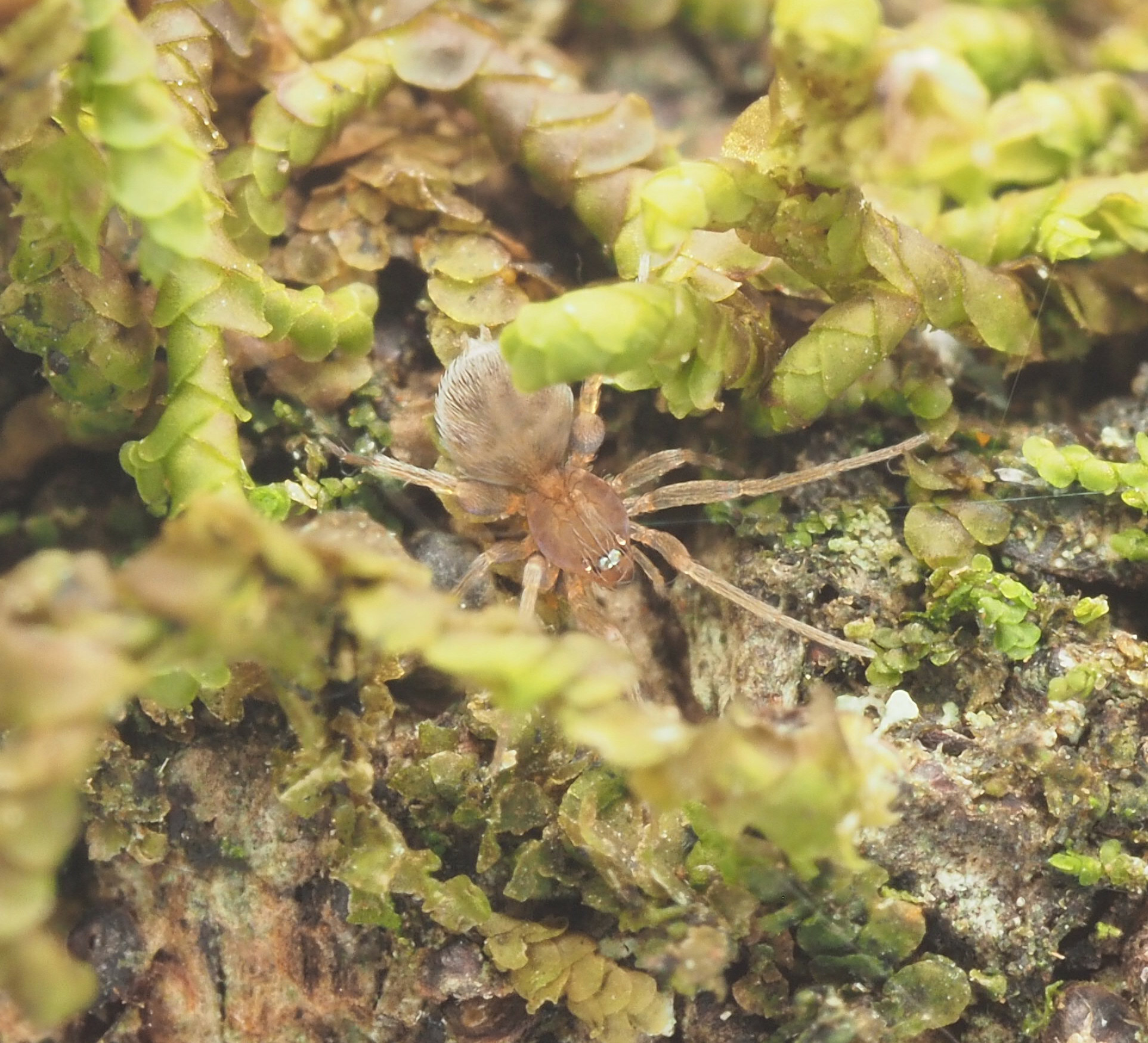
- Orchestina sp. from Australia

Scientific classification
- Kingdom: Animalia
- Phylum: Arthropoda
- Subphylum: Chelicerata
- Class: Arachnida
- Order: Araneae
- Infraorder: Araneomorphae
- Family: Oonopidae
- Genus: Orchestina; Simon, 1882

Species
- 181, see text

= Orchestina =

Orchestina Temporal range: Cretaceous–present

Genus of spiders

Orchestina is a genus of spider belonging to the family Oonopidae (goblin spiders). They can be found nearly worldwide in the Americas, Asia, Africa, Europe and Australia. Members of this genus are tiny having body lengths of around 1.0 to 3.0 mm. They are also capable of jumping due to their fourth femur being enlarged.

It was first described by Eugène Simon in 1882.

== Distribution ==
Orchestina has a nearly globally distribution however there are found mostly from Central to South America, Africa and Asia. There are a few species appearing in North America, Europe, and Australia.

China has more than 20 species with Xishuangbanna, Yunnan containing eight species being part of the Indo-Burma biodiversity hotspot. The northernmost species in China is Orchestina zhiwui.

== Ecology ==
They are a dominate group of spiders in the canopies as seen from many of their specimens being collected through canopy fogging. However they are occasionally found under bark, grasses, in litter and suspended litter. They can even be found inside of buildings.

== Species ==
Orchestina is species-rich genus including more than 180 species as of October 2025 making is one of the most speciose genera in Oonopidae.

These species listed below have articles on Wikipedia:

- Orchestina dentifera Simon, 1893 – Caribbean. Introduced to Brazil, Tanzania, Réunion, Seychelles, Sri Lanka
- Orchestina ebriola Brignoli, 1972 – Greece
- Orchestina elegans Simon, 1893 – Philippines
- Orchestina longipes Dalmas, 1922 – Portugal, Spain (Balearic Is.), France (Corsica), Italy
- Orchestina manicata Simon, 1893 – Sri Lanka, Vietnam?
- Orchestina pavesii (Simon, 1873) – Canary Islands, Southwest Europe to Greece, Bulgaria, Algeria, Egypt, Yemen (type species)
- Orchestina pilifera Dalmas, 1916 – Sri Lanka
- Orchestina setosa Dalmas, 1916 – Canary Islands, France, Italy (Sardinia), Greece (incl. Crete)
- Orchestina simoni Dalmas, 1916 – Portugal, France, Italy, Greece, Turkey
- Orchestina tubifera Simon, 1893 – Sri Lanka
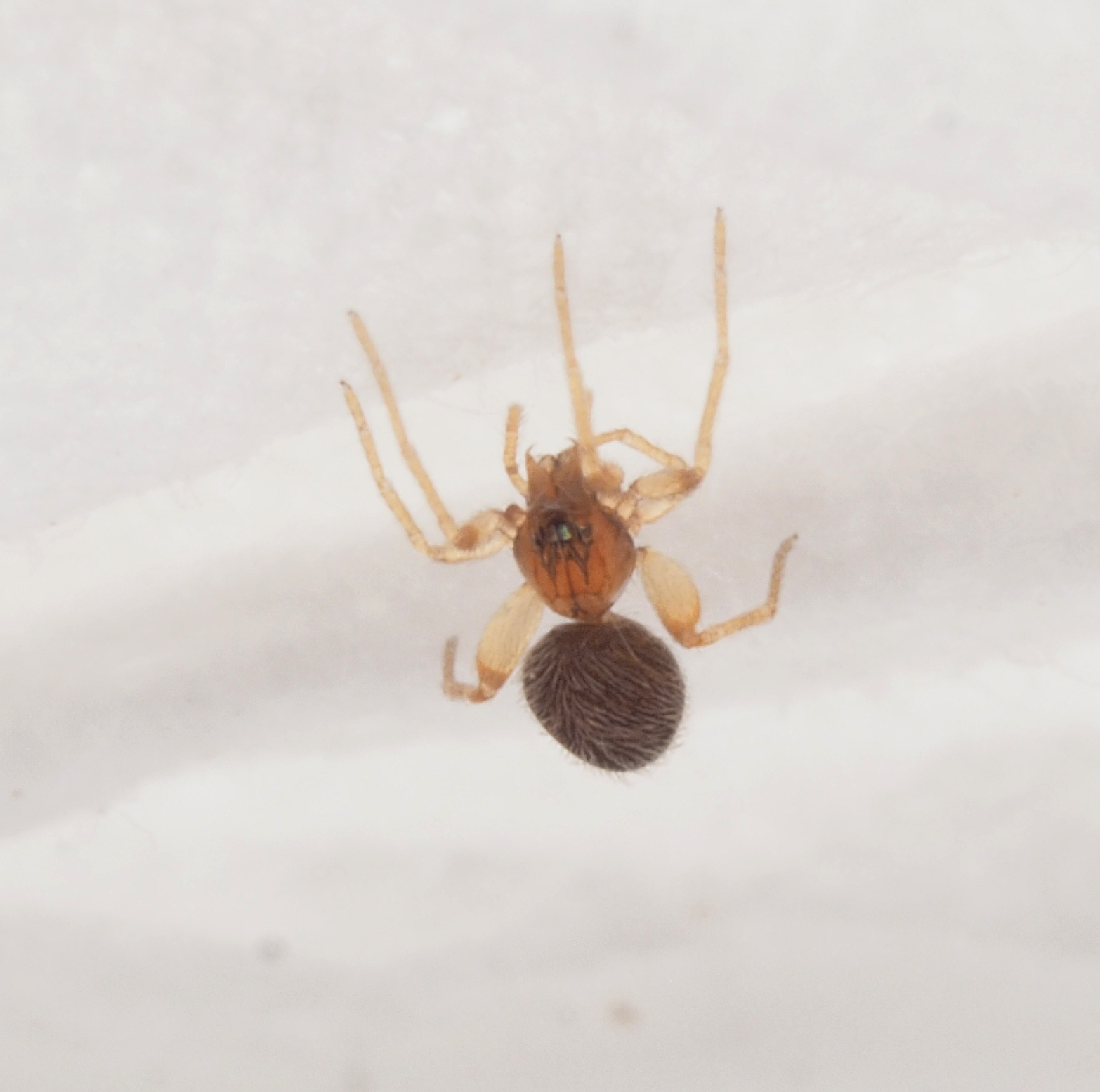
Orchestina sp. from Australia

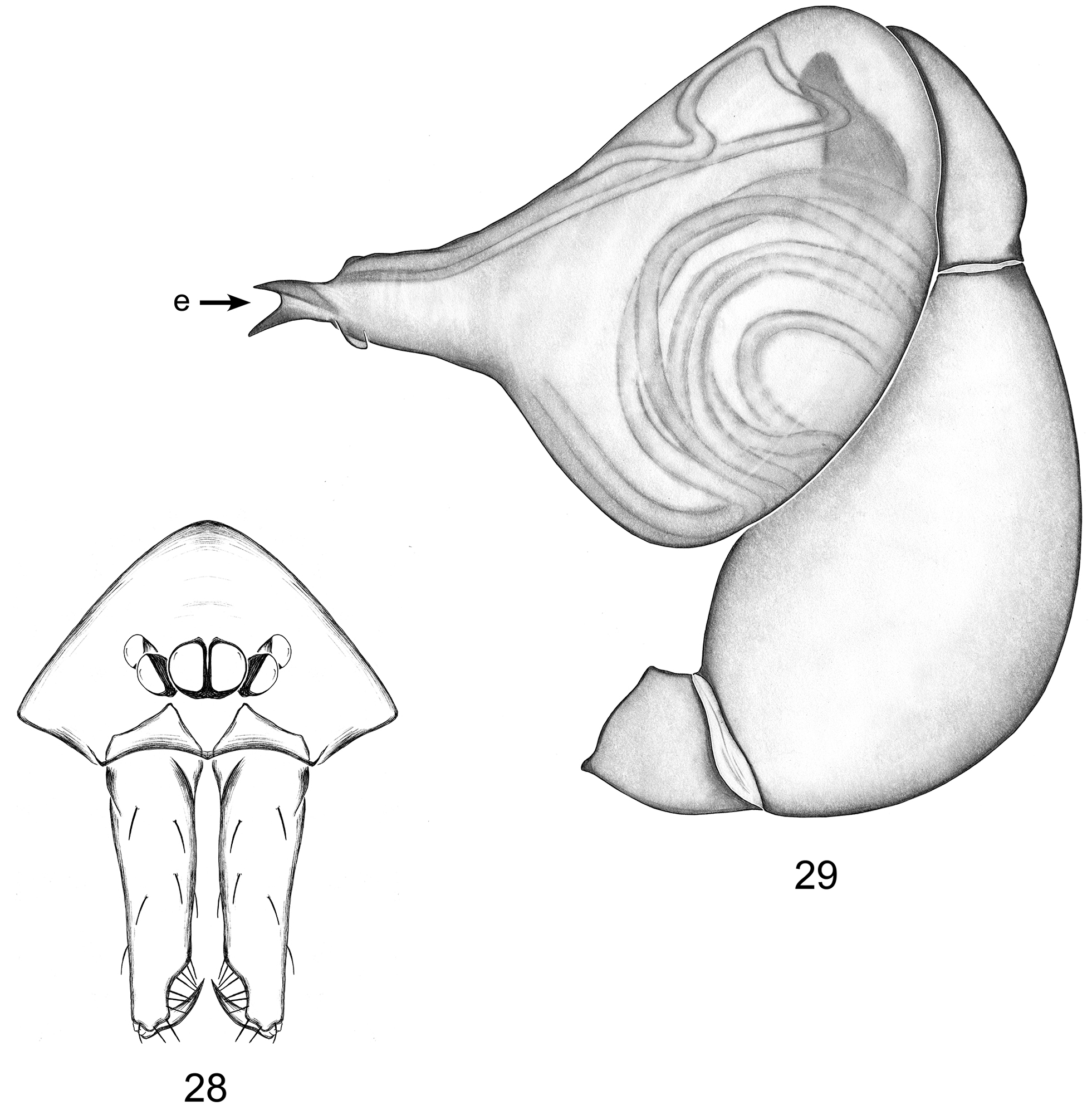
diagnostic drawings for O. yanayacu

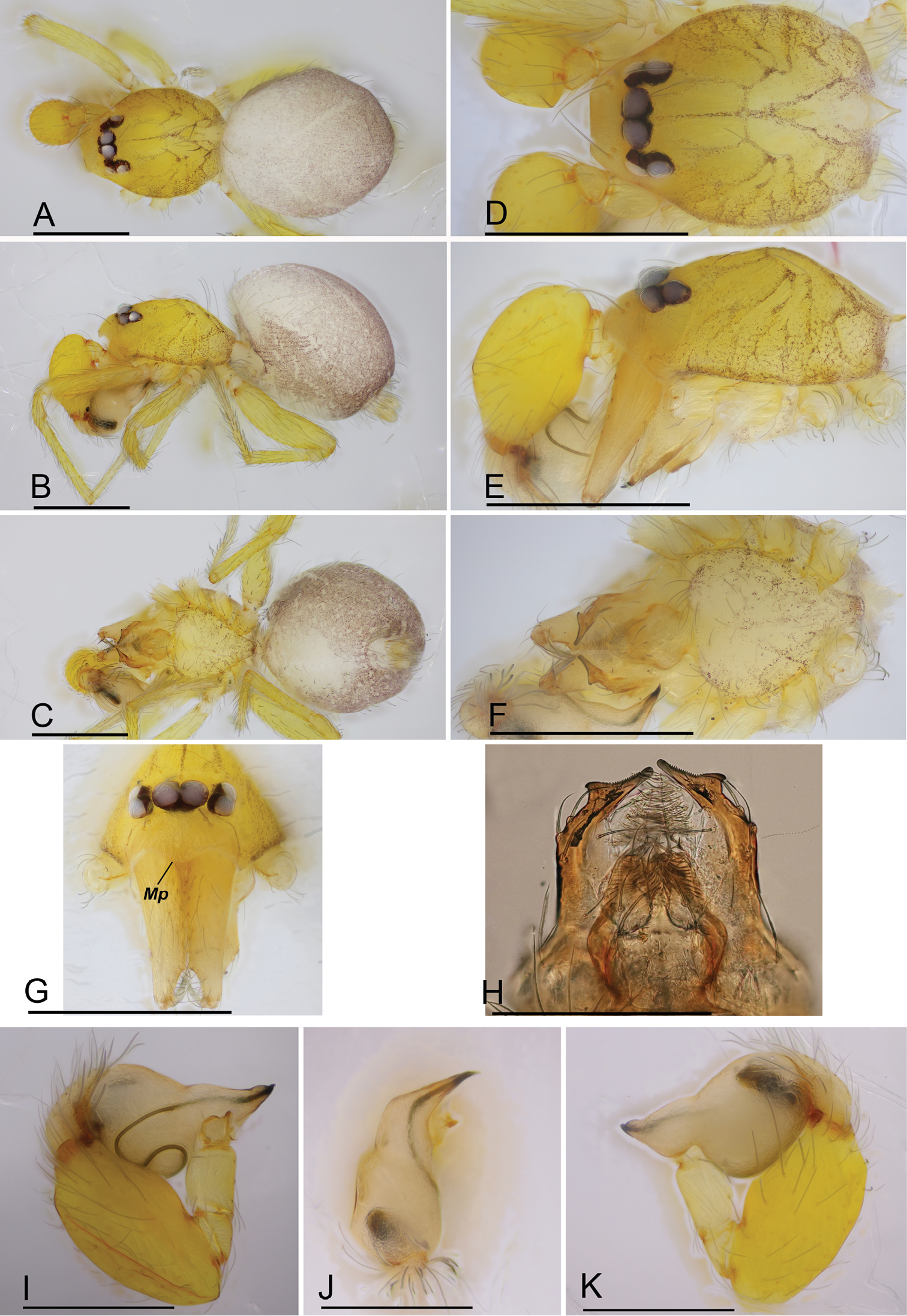
O. zhiwui

Complete species list as of October 2025
- Orchestina acaciae Henrard & Jocqué, 2012 – Tanzania
- Orchestina aerumnae Brignoli, 1978 – Bhutan
- Orchestina alata Tong & Li, 2025 – China
- Orchestina algerica Dalmas, 1916 – Algeria
- Orchestina ampulla Henrard & Jocqué, 2012 – Tanzania
- Orchestina andianavarroi Izquierdo, 2017 – Argentina
- Orchestina apiculata Liu, Xiao & Xu, 2016 – China
- Orchestina aproeste Izquierdo, 2017 – Brazil
- Orchestina arabica Dalmas, 1916 – Yemen
- Orchestina aragua Izquierdo, 2017 – Venezuela
- Orchestina arboleda Izquierdo, 2017 – Colombia
- Orchestina atocongo Izquierdo, 2017 – Peru
- Orchestina auburndalensis Izquierdo, 2017 – United States
- Orchestina aureola Tong & Li, 2011 – China
- Orchestina bedu Saaristo & van Harten, 2002 – Yemen (Socotra)
- Orchestina bialata Liu, Xiao & Xu, 2016 – China
- Orchestina bolivar Izquierdo, 2017 – Venezuela
- Orchestina bonaldoi Izquierdo, 2017 – Brazil
- Orchestina cachai Izquierdo, 2017 – Chile
- Orchestina caixiae Tong & Li, 2025 – China
- Orchestina cajamarca Izquierdo, 2017 – Peru
- Orchestina caleta Izquierdo, 2017 – Chile
- Orchestina cali Izquierdo, 2017 – Colombia
- Orchestina campana Izquierdo, 2017 – Panama
- Orchestina catarina Izquierdo, 2017 – Brazil
- Orchestina caxiuana Izquierdo, 2017 – Brazil
- Orchestina chaparrita Izquierdo, 2017 – Mexico
- Orchestina chiriqui Izquierdo, 2017 – Costa Rica, Panama
- Orchestina cincta Simon, 1893 – South Africa
- Orchestina clavigera Henrard & Jocqué, 2012 – Kenya
- Orchestina clavulata Tong & Li, 2011 – China
- Orchestina coari Izquierdo, 2017 – Brazil
- Orchestina codalmasi Wunderlich, 2011 – Malaysia
- Orchestina colubrina Liu, Henrard & Xu, 2019 – China
- Orchestina comaina Izquierdo, 2017 – Peru
- Orchestina communis Henrard & Jocqué, 2012 – Ghana, DR Congo, Uganda, Kenya
- Orchestina concava Tong & Li, 2024 – China
- Orchestina cornuta Henrard & Jocqué, 2012 – Cameroon
- Orchestina cristinae Izquierdo, 2017 – Brazil, Paraguay, Argentina
- Orchestina crypta Henrard & Jocqué, 2012 – DR Congo
- Orchestina curico Izquierdo, 2017 – Chile
- Orchestina dalmasi Denis, 1956 – Morocco
- Orchestina dapojing Tong & Yang, 2024 – China
- Orchestina debakkeri Henrard & Jocqué, 2012 – Ghana
- Orchestina dentifera Simon, 1893 – Caribbean. Introduced to Brazil, Tanzania, Réunion, Seychelles, Sri Lanka
- Orchestina divisor Izquierdo, 2017 – Brazil
- Orchestina ebriola Brignoli, 1972 – Greece
- Orchestina ecuatoriensis Izquierdo, 2017 – Ecuador
- Orchestina elegans Simon, 1893 – Philippines
- Orchestina erwini Izquierdo, 2017 – Ecuador
- Orchestina fannesi Henrard & Jocqué, 2012 – Namibia, South Africa
- Orchestina fernandina Izquierdo, 2017 – Galapagos
- Orchestina filandia Izquierdo, 2017 – Colombia
- Orchestina flagella Saaristo & van Harten, 2006 – Yemen
- Orchestina flava Ono, 2005 – Korea, Japan (Ryukyu Is.)
- Orchestina foa Saaristo & van Harten, 2002 – Yemen (Socotra)
- Orchestina fonteferrea Wunderlich, 2023 – Portugal
- Orchestina fractipes Henrard & Jocqué, 2012 – West, Central Africa
- Orchestina furcillata Wunderlich, 2008 – Azores
- Orchestina galapagos Izquierdo, 2017 – Jamaica, Panama, Galapagos
- Orchestina gibbotibialis Henrard & Jocqué, 2012 – Kenya
- Orchestina gigabulbus Henrard & Jocqué, 2012 – Ghana
- Orchestina goblin Izquierdo, 2017 – Colombia, Ecuador, Peru
- Orchestina golem Izquierdo, 2017 – Ecuador, Peru, Brazil
- Orchestina granizo Izquierdo, 2017 – Chile
- Orchestina grismadoi Izquierdo, 2017 – Bolivia
- Orchestina griswoldi Izquierdo, 2017 – Costa Rica
- Orchestina guatemala Izquierdo, 2017 – Guatemala
- Orchestina hammamali Saaristo & van Harten, 2006 – Yemen
- Orchestina hyperofrontata Tong & Yang, 2024 – China
- Orchestina iemanja Izquierdo, 2017 – Brazil
- Orchestina infirma Seo, 2017 – Korea
- Orchestina intricata Henrard & Jocqué, 2012 – Somalia, Tanzania
- Orchestina itapety Izquierdo, 2017 – Brazil
- Orchestina jaiba Izquierdo, 2017 – Chile, Argentina
- Orchestina juruti Izquierdo, 2017 – Brazil
- Orchestina kairi Izquierdo, 2017 – Trinidad
- Orchestina kamehameha Izquierdo, 2017 – Hawaii
- Orchestina kasuku Henrard & Jocqué, 2012 – DR Congo
- Orchestina labarquei Izquierdo, 2017 – Panama
- Orchestina lahj Saaristo & van Harten, 2006 – Yemen
- Orchestina lanceolata Henrard & Jocqué, 2012 – Cameroon
- Orchestina laselva Izquierdo, 2017 – Costa Rica, Ecuador
- Orchestina launcestoniensis Hickman, 1932 – Australia (Tasmania)
- Orchestina leon Izquierdo, 2017 – Brazil
- Orchestina lini Tong & Li, 2025 – China
- Orchestina longipes Dalmas, 1922 – Portugal, Spain (Balearic Is.), France (Corsica), Italy
- Orchestina longituba Tong & Li, 2025 – China
- Orchestina losamigos Izquierdo, 2017 – Peru
- Orchestina luispi Izquierdo, 2017 – Argentina
- Orchestina macrofoliata Henrard & Jocqué, 2012 – DR Congo
- Orchestina madrededios Izquierdo, 2017 – Peru
- Orchestina magna Izquierdo, 2017 – Ecuador
- Orchestina mancocapac Izquierdo, 2017 – Peru
- Orchestina manicata Simon, 1893 – Sri Lanka, Vietnam?
- Orchestina maracay Izquierdo, 2017 – Venezuela
- Orchestina maureen Saaristo, 2001 – Seychelles
- Orchestina mayo Izquierdo, 2017 – Ecuador
- Orchestina menglun Tong & Li, 2024 – China
- Orchestina microfoliata Henrard & Jocqué, 2012 – DR Congo, Uganda
- Orchestina minutissima Denis, 1937 – Algeria, Spain
- Orchestina mirabilis Saaristo & van Harten, 2006 – Yemen
- Orchestina moaba Chamberlin & Ivie, 1935 – United States
- Orchestina molles Izquierdo, 2017 – Chile
- Orchestina moura Izquierdo, 2017 – Brazil
- Orchestina moyuchi Izquierdo, 2017 – Bolivia
- Orchestina multipunctata Liu, Xiao & Xu, 2016 – China
- Orchestina nadleri Chickering, 1969 – United States
- Orchestina nahuatl Izquierdo, 2017 – Mexico
- Orchestina nahuelbuta Izquierdo, 2017 – Chile
- Orchestina neblina Izquierdo, 2017 – Venezuela
- Orchestina obscura Chamberlin & Ivie, 1942 – United States
- Orchestina okitsui Oi, 1958 – Japan
- Orchestina osorno Izquierdo, 2017 – Chile
- Orchestina otonga Izquierdo, 2017 – Ecuador
- Orchestina pakitza Izquierdo, 2017 – Colombia, Peru
- Orchestina pan Izquierdo, 2017 – Panama
- Orchestina pandeazucar Izquierdo, 2017 – Chile
- Orchestina para Izquierdo, 2017 – Brazil
- Orchestina paupercula Dalmas, 1916 – Gabon
- Orchestina pavesii (Simon, 1873) – Canary Islands, Southwest Europe to Greece, Bulgaria, Algeria, Egypt, Yemen (type species)
- Orchestina pavesiiformis Saaristo, 2007 – Portugal, Spain, Georgia, Israel. Introduced to United States, Brazil, Argentina, Uruguay
- Orchestina pilifera Dalmas, 1916 – Sri Lanka
- Orchestina pizarroi Izquierdo, 2017 – Chile
- Orchestina platnicki Izquierdo, 2017 – Colombia, Brazil, Argentina
- Orchestina predator Izquierdo, 2017 – Ecuador
- Orchestina probosciformis Henrard & Jocqué, 2012 – DR Congo, Uganda
- Orchestina qingyuani Tong & Li, 2025 – China
- Orchestina quasimodo Izquierdo, 2017 – United States
- Orchestina quenies Izquierdo, 2017 – Chile
- Orchestina quijos Izquierdo, 2017 – Ecuador
- Orchestina ranchogrande Izquierdo, 2017 – Venezuela
- Orchestina rapaz Izquierdo, 2017 – Brazil
- Orchestina retiro Izquierdo, 2017 – Brazil
- Orchestina saaristoi Henrard & Jocqué, 2012 – Nigeria, DR Congo, Yemen
- Orchestina saltabunda Simon, 1893 – Venezuela
- Orchestina saltitans Banks, 1894 – United States
- Orchestina sanguinea Oi, 1955 – Japan
- Orchestina santodomingo Izquierdo, 2017 – Ecuador
- Orchestina sarava Izquierdo, 2017 – Brazil
- Orchestina saudade Izquierdo, 2017 – Brazil
- Orchestina sechellorum Benoit, 1979 – Seychelles
- Orchestina sedotmikha Saaristo, 2007 – Israel
- Orchestina setosa Dalmas, 1916 – Canary Islands, France, Italy (Sardinia), Greece (incl. Crete)
- Orchestina shuar Izquierdo, 2017 – Ecuador
- Orchestina silvae Izquierdo, 2017 – Peru
- Orchestina simoni Dalmas, 1916 – Portugal, France, Italy, Greece, Turkey
- Orchestina sinensis Xu, 1987 – China, Taiwan
- Orchestina sotoi Izquierdo, 2017 – Ecuador, Brazil
- Orchestina storozhenkoi (Saaristo & Marusik, 2004) – Russia (Far East)
- Orchestina striata Simon, 1909 – Vietnam
- Orchestina subclavulata Tong & Li, 2024 – China
- Orchestina subconcava Tong & Li, 2025 – China
- Orchestina sublongituba Tong & Li, 2025 – China
- Orchestina taruma Izquierdo, 2017 – Brazil
- Orchestina tentoria Tong & Li, 2025 – China
- Orchestina thoracica Xu, 1987 – China
- Orchestina topcui Danişman & Coşar, 2012 – Turkey
- Orchestina totoralillo Izquierdo, 2017 – Chile
- Orchestina truncata Wunderlich, 2004 – Costa Rica, Colombia, Ecuador
- Orchestina truncatula Tong & Li, 2011 – China, India
- Orchestina tubifera Simon, 1893 – Sri Lanka
- Orchestina tubulata Tong & Li, 2011 – China (Hainan)
- Orchestina tzantza Izquierdo, 2017 – Ecuador, Peru
- Orchestina ucumar Izquierdo, 2017 – Bolivia, Brazil, Argentina
- Orchestina utahana Chamberlin & Ivie, 1935 – United States, Mexico
- Orchestina vainuia Marples, 1955 – Samoa
- Orchestina valquiria Izquierdo, 2017 – Brazil
- Orchestina venezuela Izquierdo, 2017 – Venezuela
- Orchestina waorani Izquierdo, 2017 – Ecuador, Brazil
- Orchestina wengnan Tong & Li, 2024 – China
- Orchestina wuzu Tong & Li, 2025 – China
- Orchestina xiebao Lin & Li, 2024 – China
- Orchestina xuexing Tong & Li, 2025 – China
- Orchestina xui Tong & Li, 2024 – China
- Orchestina yanayacu Izquierdo, 2017 – Ecuador
- Orchestina yigong Tong & Li, 2025 – China
- Orchestina yinggezui Tong & Li, 2011 – China (Hainan)
- Orchestina zhengi Tong & Li, 2011 – China (Hainan)
- Orchestina zhiwui Liu, Xu & Henrard, 2019 – China
- Orchestina zingara Izquierdo, 2017 – Colombia
