= Gender Unicorn =

Diagram of gender

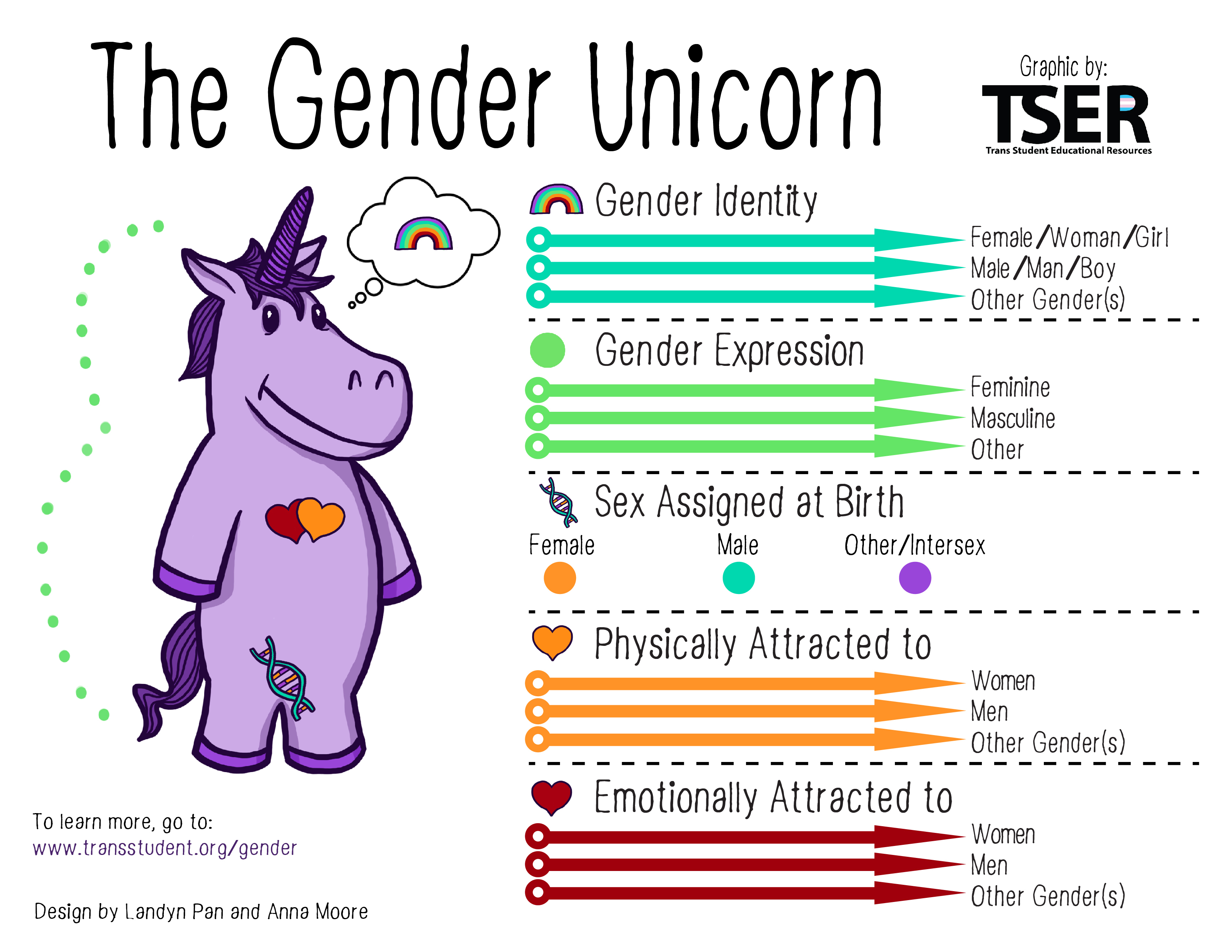
The Gender Unicorn

The Gender Unicorn is a diagram that explains the differences between gender, sex, and sexuality. The diagram features a lavender unicorn with dark purple hair and spectrums related to gender identity, gender expression, physical attraction, and emotional attraction.

== History ==
In 2014, Trans Student Educational Resources, a trans youth support group, created the diagram. The diagram has been used in various schools, hospitals, universities, and colleges. The diagram has faced criticism and controversy from conservatives such as Matt Walsh and Franklin Graham. Franklin Graham wrote on his Facebook account, that the diagram was "communist brainwashing" and teaching it in schools is a "dangerous path".

A Kansas high school faced backlash after this diagram was used in a Human Growth and Development class. Olathe Public Schools responded by saying it was not part of their curriculum and did not ask students to complete the diagram.
