= Joseph Einhorn =

American entrepreneur and businessman

- Born: New York City, United States
- Occupation: Owner of Loot

Joseph Einhorn is an American entrepreneur and businessperson who is best known as the founder and CEO of the company Fancy, a social e-commerce platform. Fancy describes itself as "part store, blog, magazine and wish list," and Einhorn has said that it seeks to redefine the shopping experience. Fancy was valued at $600 million by American Express, Billionaire Len Blavatnik, Actor Will Smith and other investors on July 3, 2013. In February 2015, Einhorn's company Fancy raised a $20 million Series D strategic funding round which was led by Mexico's Carlos Slim Domit and the CCC holding company.

In July 2019, Einhorn opened a comic book store called Loot.

== Biography ==
Einhorn was born in New York City, NY, and turned 30 years old in 2012. He is married with two sons and two Chihuahuas. Einhorn became involved in the startup world at age 16, when he became the first employee of Capital IQ, a corporate information service. In 2004, he co-founded and served as CTO of Inform Technologies, LLC, which connected related content across online media and information companies. In 2009, Einhorn founded the social e-commerce platform Fancy.

Einhorn is a fan of rap music – especially by the artist Drake – and has said that Kanye West's blog influenced Fancy's website. Einhorn has also been a personal user and supporter of Google Glass, leading to his company's Google Glass app that suggests items based on colors the user is looking at.

== Loot ==
Einhorn is the owner of the comic book store Loot in Brooklyn, which opened in July 2019. He plans to host workshops on teaching kids how to write and draw their own comics in order to promote creativity and alternatives to video games at Loot. Einhorn credits his motivation to promote creativity in kids to a high school science fair, during which he won a chance to make a hologram that he has kept to this day. Loot was featured on the Today Show in January 2020.

The name of the store comes from the idea that kids can earn 'loot' for buying, borrowing, or making and selling their own comics. Einhorn's inspiration for the store comes from his own interest in comics as a kid and loot mechanics in Fortnite.

The store's collection of comics began as Einhorn's personal stash and has grown with donations, with additional sponsorships coming from Warby Parker and Louis Leterrier. Most of the store's collection consists of superhero comics.

== Fancy ==
Einhorn founded Fancy in 2009. He has described his company as a service that "combines the best features of Pinterest with the traditional Amazon experience," creating an image-centric e-commerce platform where users set the trends by posting items they 'fancy.' In a 2012 interview with Hypebeast, Einhorn said that Fancy seeks to become "the new Amazon.com" by creating a social e-commerce platform where users can interact with one another to explore, discover, and purchase items.

Fancy is distinctly different from sites like Pinterest in that it offers merchants the ability to sell items directly to consumers. In order to sell on Fancy, a merchant needs to 'claim' an item that users have already posted. Fancy takes a commission fee from each sale.

Fancy has attracted a number of well-known backers and board members, including American Express, Francois-Henri Pinault, Len Blavatnik, Will Smith, Jack Dorsey of Twitter, and Chris Hughes of Facebook. High-profile users include Mark Zuckerberg and Kanye West, who has been an outspoken supporter of the site.

In September 2013 Einhorn secured an investment round of $7 million for Fancy from, among others, Richard C. Perry, owner of Barneys New York, and his son David Perry. In February 2015, Fancy raised a $20 million Series D strategic funding round which was led by Mexico's Carlos Slim Domit and the CCC holding company. Fancy noted that it would use the funding to "continue to build out its technology platform and execute on new key strategic partnerships”.

== Recognition ==
- Crain's New York Business listed Einhorn as one of the 40 most successful entrepreneurs under the age of 40 for 2014.
- Business of Fashion named Einhorn in its list of 500 People Shaping the Global Fashion Industry.
- Business Insider ranked Einhorn at #32 in its Silicon Alley 100 list of the Coolest People in New York Tech.
