= De Eenhoorn, Haarlem =

Windmill in Schalkwijk, Netherlands

De Eenhoorn
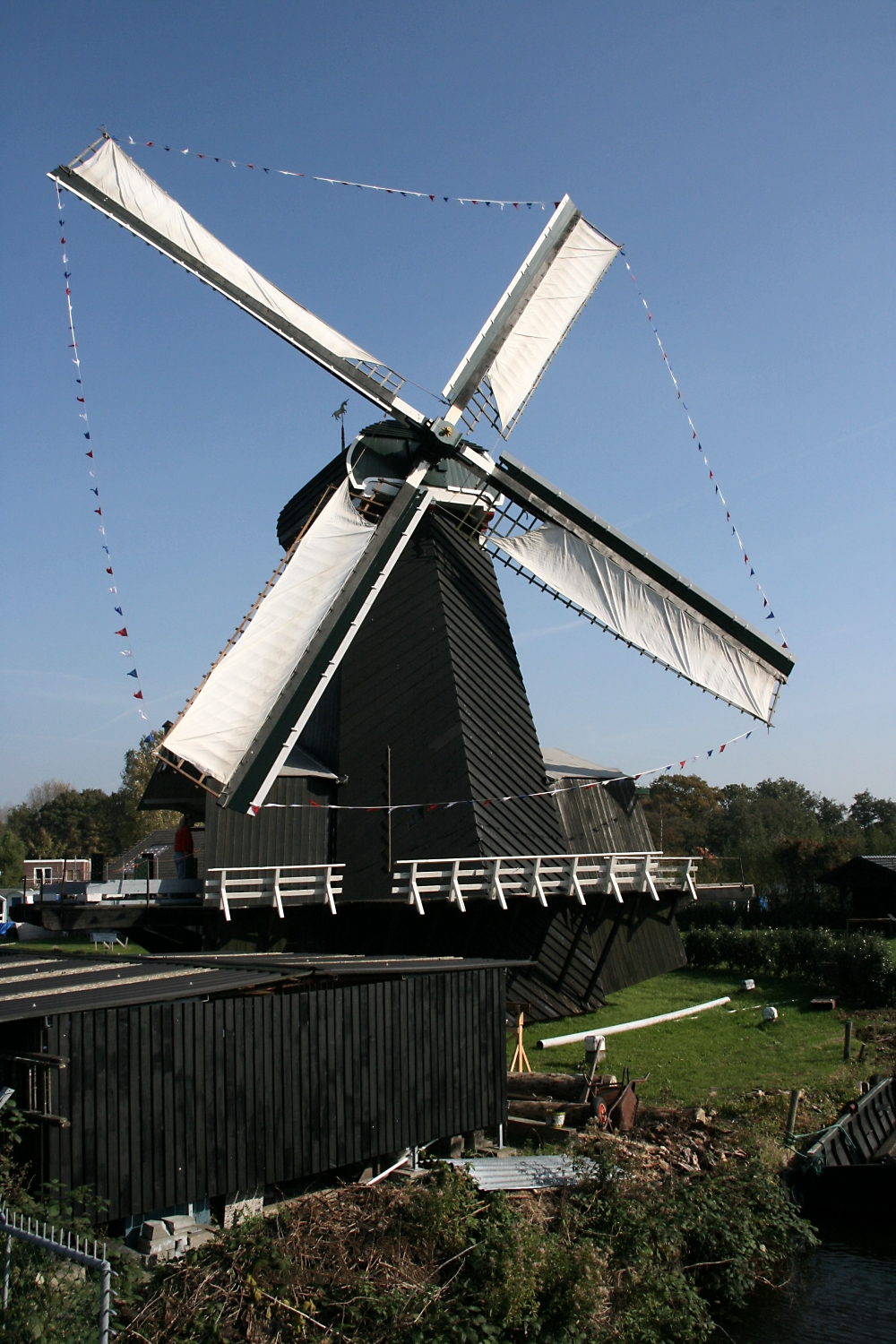
- De Eenhoorn, 2008

Origin
- Mill name: De Eenhoorn
- Mill location: On a towpath near the Zuid-Schalkwijkerweg in Haarlem
- Coordinates: 52.358432°N 4.637938°E
- Operator(s): Stichting Molens Zuid-Kennemerland, owned by municipally Haarlem
- Year built: 1776(?)

Information
- Purpose: Sawmill
- Type: Paltrok mill
- No. of sails: Four sails
- Type of sails: Common sails
- Windshaft: Cast iron
- Winding: Tailpole and winch
- Other information: Four vertical frame saws (one now disused)

De Eenhoorn (Dutch pronunciation: [də ˈʔeːnɦoːr(ə)n]; English: The Unicorn) is a paltrok mill in Haarlem, Netherlands which has been restored to working order. As all Dutch paltrok mills it is a wind-powered sawmill. The mill is listed as a Rijksmonument, number 19872.

== History ==
The first mentions of a sawmill on this location date from the 17th century. A date, 23-8-1776, found inscribed in the mill, suggests the current paltrok mill was built to replace an older mill at that date. Ownership of the mill regularly changed over the years. The end of its working years came when an electric-powered sawmill was built in 1924, making the old windmill superfluous. De Hollandsche Molen then acquired the mill to save it from demolition. The mill was restored and for a few years rented back to millers, though these mostly used the electric sawmill. Around 1931 was the last time the windmill was used commercially. The mill was repaired again in 1936 but it was worked very little. In 1949 foundation Nehim-Molen "De Eenhoorn" was set up by one of the directors of wood trading company N.V. Nederlandse Houtimport Maatschappij "Nehim" with the goal to restore and operate De Eenhoorn. The foundation restored and owned the windmill until its dissolution in 1957 and the mill returned to De Hollandse Molen who in turn sold it to municipally Haarlem in 1963. De Eenhoorn is operated by Stichting Molens Zuid-Kennemerland since 1984. The sawing mechanisms were restored so the mill was fully functional again by 1990. Repairs to the frame of the mill were carried out from 1992 to 1993.

== Description ==
De Eenhoorn is a Dutch paltrok mill - a wooden mill supported on a short central post and a ring of wooden rollers on a low brick base and designed specifically for sawing wood. The mill body is boarded, however the sawing floor is open on three sides with only the windward facing side and the side roofs giving protection against the weather. The entire mill is winded by a tailpole and winch. On the front is a stage, 2.80 metres (9 ft 2 in) above ground for setting the sails. The sails are common sails with a span of 20 metres (65 ft 7 in). They are carried on a cast-iron windshaft of unknown manufacturer. The brake wheel with 75 cogs drives the crank wheel with 33 radial cogs on the horizontal crank shaft. There is no upright shaft. The crank shaft has four crank pins to drive four sawing frames, one more than common in Dutch wind-sawmills. The mill is also a bit wider than common to accommodate the extra sawing frame. The rearmost sawing frame was later removed and replaced by a reciprocating weight to keep the mechanism balanced. Connecting rods from the crank pins drive the frame saws. Reciprocating lever bars also drive the pawl and ratchet mechanisms which in turn drive the winches and the feeding mechanism of the log carriages through rack and pinion mechanisms. The winches can be used with the log hoist to lift logs from the water onto the sawing platform and to pull the log carriages back to their starting position.

== Public access ==
The mill is open to visitors on Saturdays and on appointment.
