= Unicorn trend =

2010s fashion trend

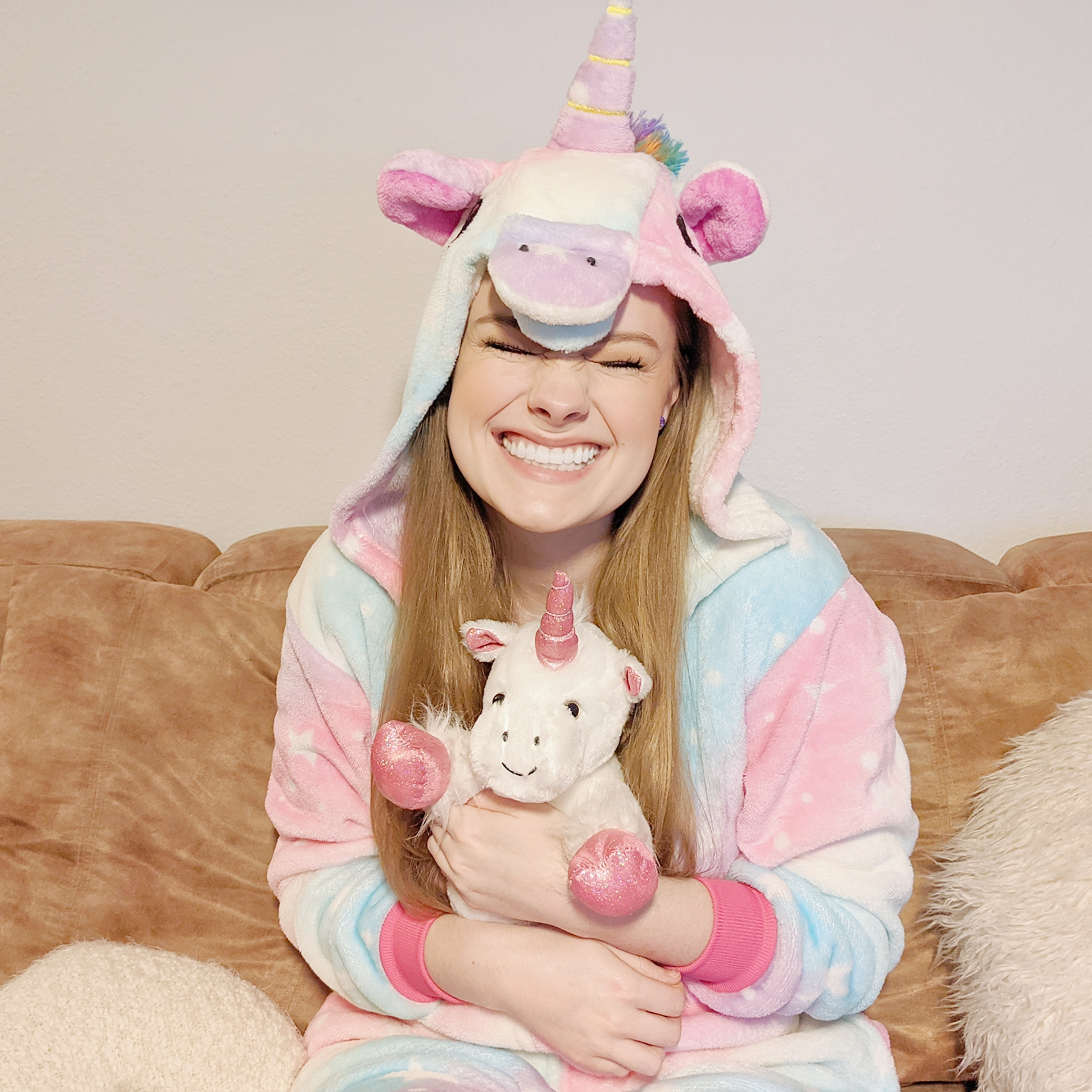
A person wearing a unicorn onesie

The unicorn trend was a 2016—2019 fad where individuals designed, produced, and use consumer goods which were adorned with unicorns and vibrantly colored designs; typically composed of rainbow, pastel, or highly saturated colors. This tendency has gained in popularity since 2016, especially among millennials, who typically associated it with childhood and as a form of escapism. Its popularity was augmented by influencer and celebrity culture on social media. Some examples of consumer products that are commonly decorated in this style are phone cases, clothing, water bottles, tote bags, makeup, and food.

== Trend development ==
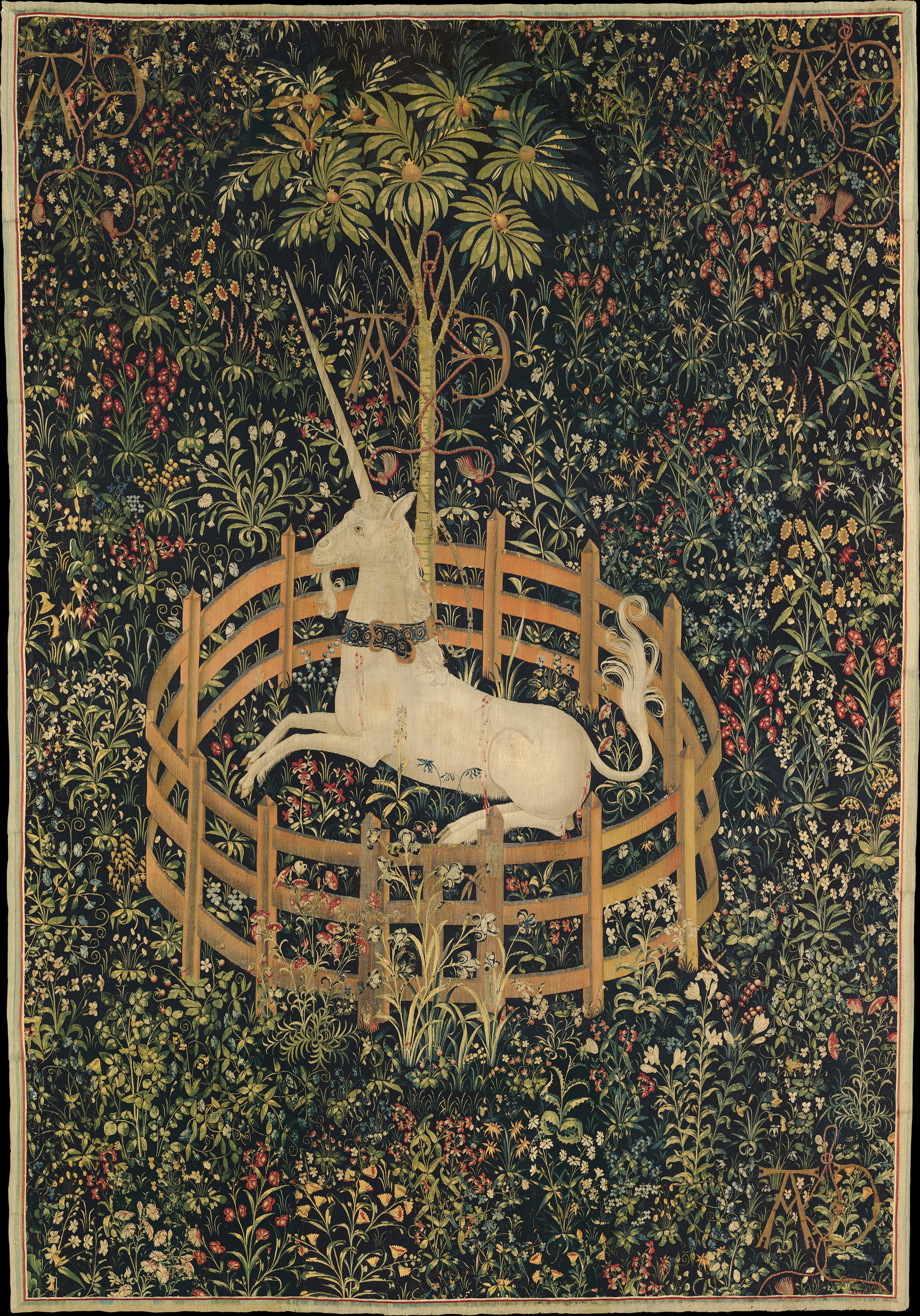
The Unicorn in Captivity, one of The Hunt of the Unicorn tapestries, c. 1495–1505, The Cloisters

=== Before 2016 ===
The unicorn has had an aesthetic and commercial value for centuries. The first written references to unicorns date back to the 5th century BCE by Ctesias in his book Indica. The Ancient Greeks believed unicorns to be a natural animal and pictured it to be a ferocious and invincible chimerical beast with a long horn projecting from its head. Later bestiaries and religious texts, such as the Physiologus, allegorically said that the ferocious unicorn could only be tamed by a virgin damsel, becoming a folkloric creature symbolizing chastity, purity, and the Virgin Mary, making it a popular religious symbol used in Western art and culture during the Middle Ages and Renaissance.

In the 20th century, the unicorn was reimagined in popular culture as a horse with pastel and bright colours and sparkly eyes, popular among young girls during the 1980s.

=== 2016—2019 ===
Health food photographer Adeline Waugh unintentionally started the unicorn food trend in June 2016. As a food blogger, she enjoyed experimenting with cream cheese and natural pigments on toasts, which led her to create a pastel-coloured cream to decorate her toasts. Her followers appreciated the experiment and started calling it "unicorn toast". This was followed by unicorn lattes, cakes, hot chocolate, and other kinds of food and drink. The trend developed further as the colour scheme was used on a variety of products, mainly cosmetics. Marketers soon recognised the power of this fad and started exploiting it for commercial purposes. Starbucks launched a Unicorn Frappuccino in April 2017 and majorly contributed to the boom of the unicorn fad. The LGBTQ community also embraced this trend, as its colors are reminiscent of the community's signature flag.

According to Vaughn Scribner, this infatuation with unicorns is not new, though social media caused it to spread on a much wider scale. In 2016, it became a whole cultural phenomenon.

Google Trends saw a spike in the term "unicorn" in April 2017, when Starbucks launched its Unicorn Frappuccino. From August 2016 through July 2017, searches on Pinterest for unicorn food saw an increase of nearly 400%, while those for unicorn makeup reached more than 460%. On Instagram, the hashtag unicorn has amassed more than 5.9 million posts.

The trend largely subsided by 2019.

== Subcategories of the trend ==
=== Unicorn food ===
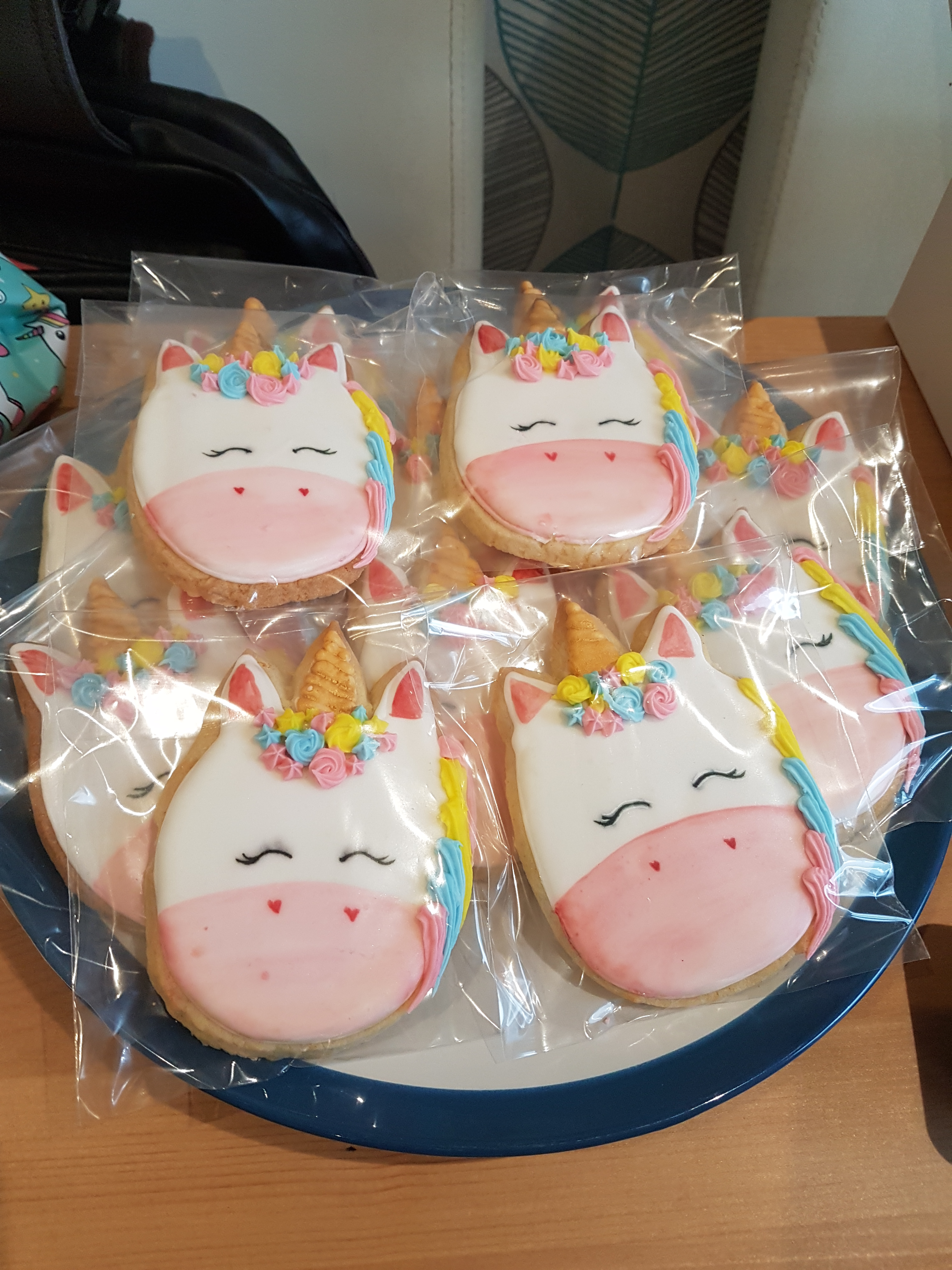
Unicorn cookies

The "unicorn toastie" or "unicorn grilled cheese" was introduced by the Hong Kong Kala Toast in April 2016, containing multicolored stripes of cheese, each colored and flavored with natural infusions. Major food manufacturers and restaurant chains released "unicorn" products, including snacks, cakes, cereal, beverages, ice cream, and gum in reaction to the trend. In 2017, Starbucks released the internet-famous Unicorn Frappuccino consisting of a purple color-changing drink with some blue tones with a sweet and a fruity taste.

=== Unicorn beauty ===
By 2017, artist Lisa Frank made a collaboration with the brand Glamour Dolls Makeup and released a cruelty-free makeup collection with the packaging covered by her famous rainbow animal prints.

In 2018, Paris Hilton launched a skincare line, starting with the release of a limited edition rose water named "Unicorn Mist". In 2019, during the National Unicorn Day (celebrated on April 9 in the U.S.), Paris Hilton announced on social media the re-release of the sold-out product.

Due to the popularity of this trend in this sector, products labelled as "unicorn snot" (holographic glitter body gel), "unicorn tears" (lipsticks and lip-glosses) and "unicorn essence" (skincare serum) appeared in the market.

=== Unicorn design ===
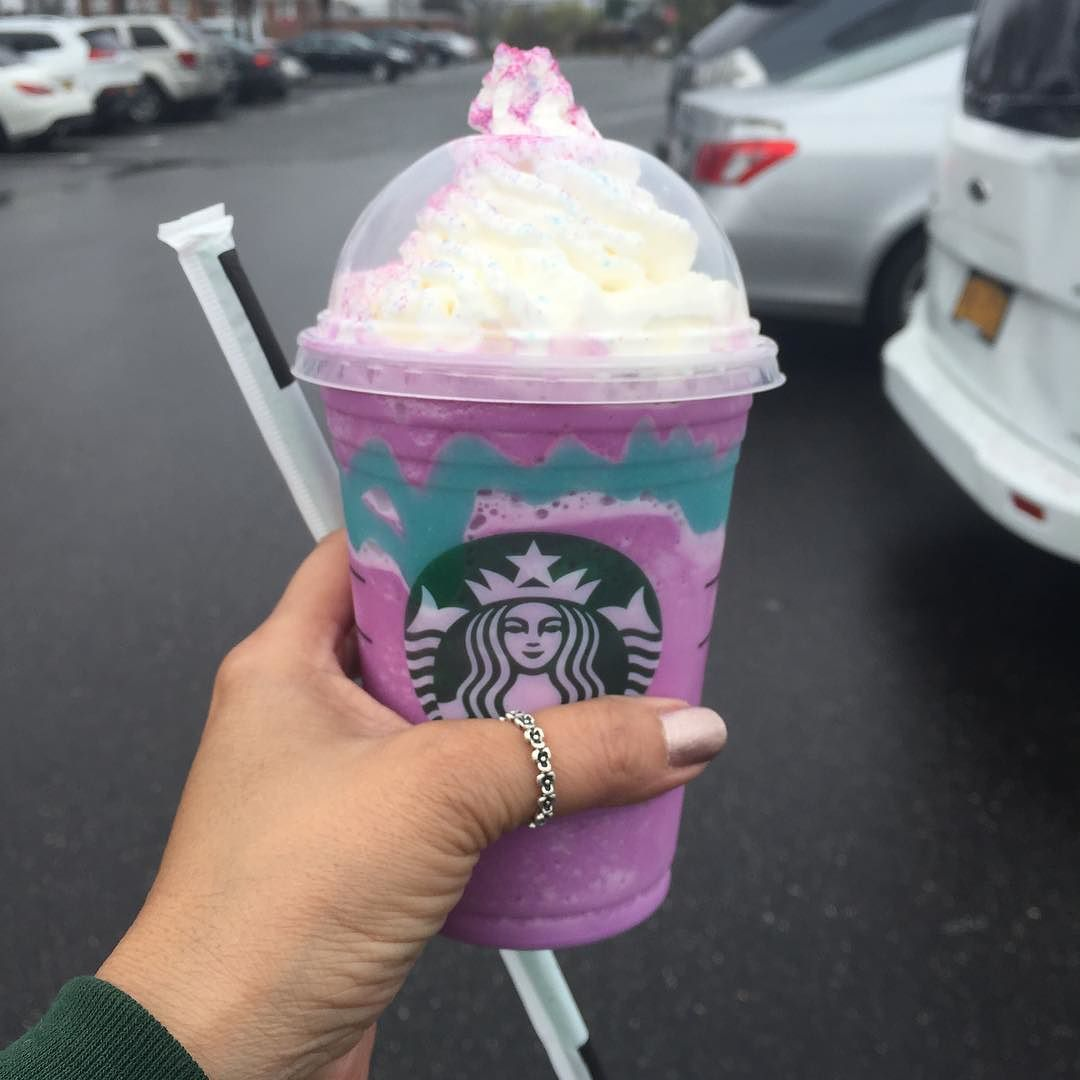
Starbucks Unicorn Frappuccino from 2017

The Unicorn Trend has featured in the world of design with the creation of daily use objects and gadgets with the appearance and colors of unicorns. The designs are often found on pillows, sheets and bed-covers, drinking cups, and flatware. One of the most popular items was the inflatable unicorn pool float.

=== Unicorn fashion ===
In 2016, actress Margot Robbie wore an Alexander McQueen gown adorned with a gold sequin unicorn to the premiere of the film Suicide Squad. During the 2017 Milan Fashion Week, Moschino unveiled a capsule collection in collaboration with the children's toy brand My Little Pony. Models were parading on the runway clothed with bubble-gum pink and baby blue looks displaying the toys' graphic. During the 2018 Paris Fashion Week, American designer Thom Browne ended his show with a model walking out on the runway having a unicorn on leash. The unicorn consisted of two male models wearing an elaborate white tulle costume coordinated with the look of the model.
