= South African Class 6E1, Series 2 =

Class of 50 South African electric locomotives

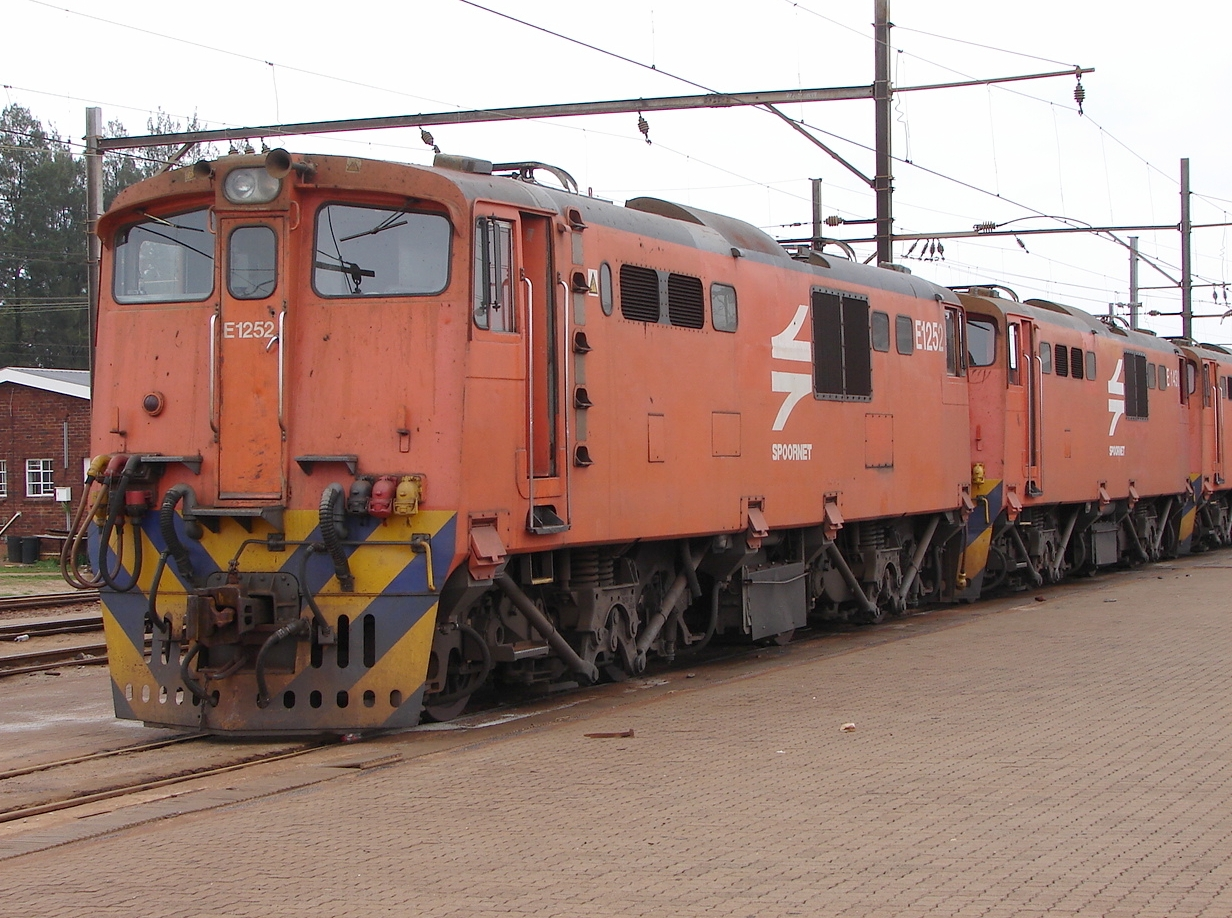
- E1252 at Sentrarand, 29 September 2009
Type and origin
- Power type: Electric
- Designer: Union Carriage & Wagon
- Builder: Union Carriage & Wagon
- Model: UCW 6E1
- Build date: 1971
- Total produced: 50
- Rebuilder: Transnet Rail Engineering
- Rebuild date: 2013-2015
- Number rebuilt: 5 to Class 18E, Series 2
Specifications
- Configuration
  - AAR: B-B
  - UIC: Bo'Bo'
  - Commonwealth: Bo-Bo
- Gauge: 3 ft 6 in (1,067 mm) Cape gauge
- Wheel diameter: 1,220 mm (48.03 in)
- Wheelbase: 11,279 mm (37 ft 1/16 in)
  - Bogie: 3,430 mm (11 ft 3 1/16 in)
- Pivot centres: 7,849 mm (25 ft 9 in)
- Panto shoes: 6,972 mm (22 ft 10 1/2 in)
- Length
  - Over couplers: 15,494 mm (50 ft 10 in)
  - Over body: 14,631 mm (48 ft 0 in)
- Width: 2,896 mm (9 ft 6 in)
- Height
  - Pantograph: 4,089 mm (13 ft 5 in)
  - Body height: 3,937 mm (12 ft 11.0 in)
- Axle load: 22,226 kg (49,000 lb)
- Adhesive weight: 88,904 kg (196,000 lb)
- Loco weight: 88,904 kg (196,000 lb)
- Electric system/s: 3 kV DC catenary
- Current pickup: Pantographs
- Traction motors: Four AEI-283AZ
  - Rating 1 hour: 623 kW (835 hp)
  - Continuous: 563 kW (755 hp)
- Gear ratio: 18:67
- Loco brake: Air & Regenerative
- Train brakes: Air & Vacuum
- Couplers: AAR knuckle
Performance figures
- Maximum speed: 113 km/h (70 mph)
- Power output
  - 1 hour: 2,492 kW (3,342 hp)
  - Continuous: 2,252 kW (3,020 hp)
- Tractive effort
  - Starting: 311 kN (70,000 lbf)
  - 1 hour: 221 kN (50,000 lbf)
  - Continuous: 193 kN (43,000 lbf) @ 40 km/h (25 mph)
Career
- Operators: South African Railways; Spoornet; Transnet Freight Rail
- Class: Class 6E1
- Number in class: 50
- Numbers: E1246-E1295
- Delivered: 1971
- First run: 1971

The South African Railways Class 6E1, Series 2 of 1971 was an electric locomotive.

In 1971, the South African Railways placed fifty Class 6E1, Series 2 electric locomotives with a Bo-Bo wheel arrangement in mainline service. Series 2 was the first of the Class 6E1s to have their sandbox lids set into the bottom edge of the locomotive body sides.

== Manufacturer ==
The 3 kV DC Class 6E1, Series 2 electric locomotive was designed and built for the South African Railways (SAR) in 1971 by Union Carriage & Wagon (UCW) in Nigel, Transvaal, with the electrical equipment being supplied by General Electric Company (GEC).

Fifty units were delivered in 1971, numbered in the range from E1246 to E1295. Like Series 1, Series 2 units were equipped with four AEI-283AZ axle-hung traction motors fitted with roller bearings. UCW did not allocate works numbers to the locomotives it built for the SAR and used the SAR unit numbers for their record keeping.

== Characteristics ==
=== Orientation ===
These dual cab locomotives had a roof access ladder on one side only, just to the right of the cab access door. The roof access ladder end was marked as the no. 2 end. A corridor along the centre of the unit connected the cabs which were identical apart from the fact that the handbrake was located in cab 2. A pantograph hook stick was stowed in a tube mounted below the bottom edge of the locomotive body on the roof access ladder side. The units had one square and two rectangular access panels along the lower half of the body on the roof access ladder side, and only one square access panel on the opposite side.

=== Series identifying features ===
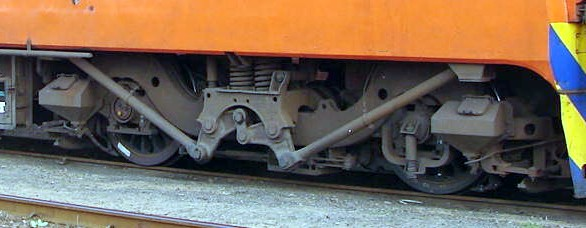
Series 1 sandboxes

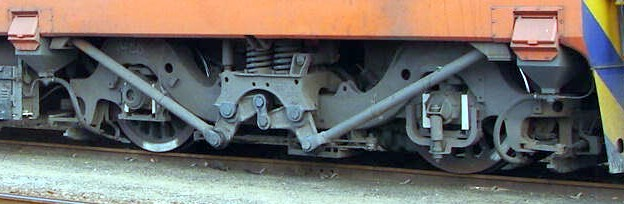
Series 2 to 11 sandboxes

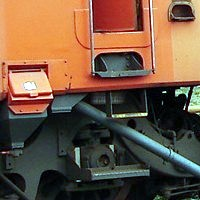
Narrow stirrup on no. E1345

While some Class 6E1 series are visually indistinguishable from their predecessors or successors, some externally visible changes did occur over the years. Series 1 units had their sandboxes mounted on the bogies while Series 2 to 11 had their sandboxes mounted along the bottom edge of the locomotive body with the sandbox lids fitting into four cut-outs in the body on each side.

The fifty Series 2 and the first fifty Series 3 units are visually indistinguishable from each other. Since the traction struts on the Class 6E1 bogie allowed room for only one footstep to be mounted on the bogie, a stirrup step was attached to the bodywork directly below the side door. On the Series 3 units in the number range from E1346 to E1445, an externally visible difference is a wider stirrup below their side doors. This appears to indicate that Series 2 should actually have consisted of one hundred units and not fifty, firstly since unit numbers E1246 to E1345 are identical in exterior appearance and secondly since Series 4, 5 and 6 were all delivered in batches of one hundred. In addition, Series 2 and 3 used the same AEI-283AZ traction motors.

== Service ==
The Class 6E1 family saw service all over both 3 kV DC mainline and branchline networks, the smaller Cape Western mainline between Cape Town and Beaufort West and the larger network which covers portions of the Northern Cape, the Free State, Natal, Gauteng, North West and Mpumalanga.

== Reclassification and rebuilding ==
=== Reclassification to Class 16E ===
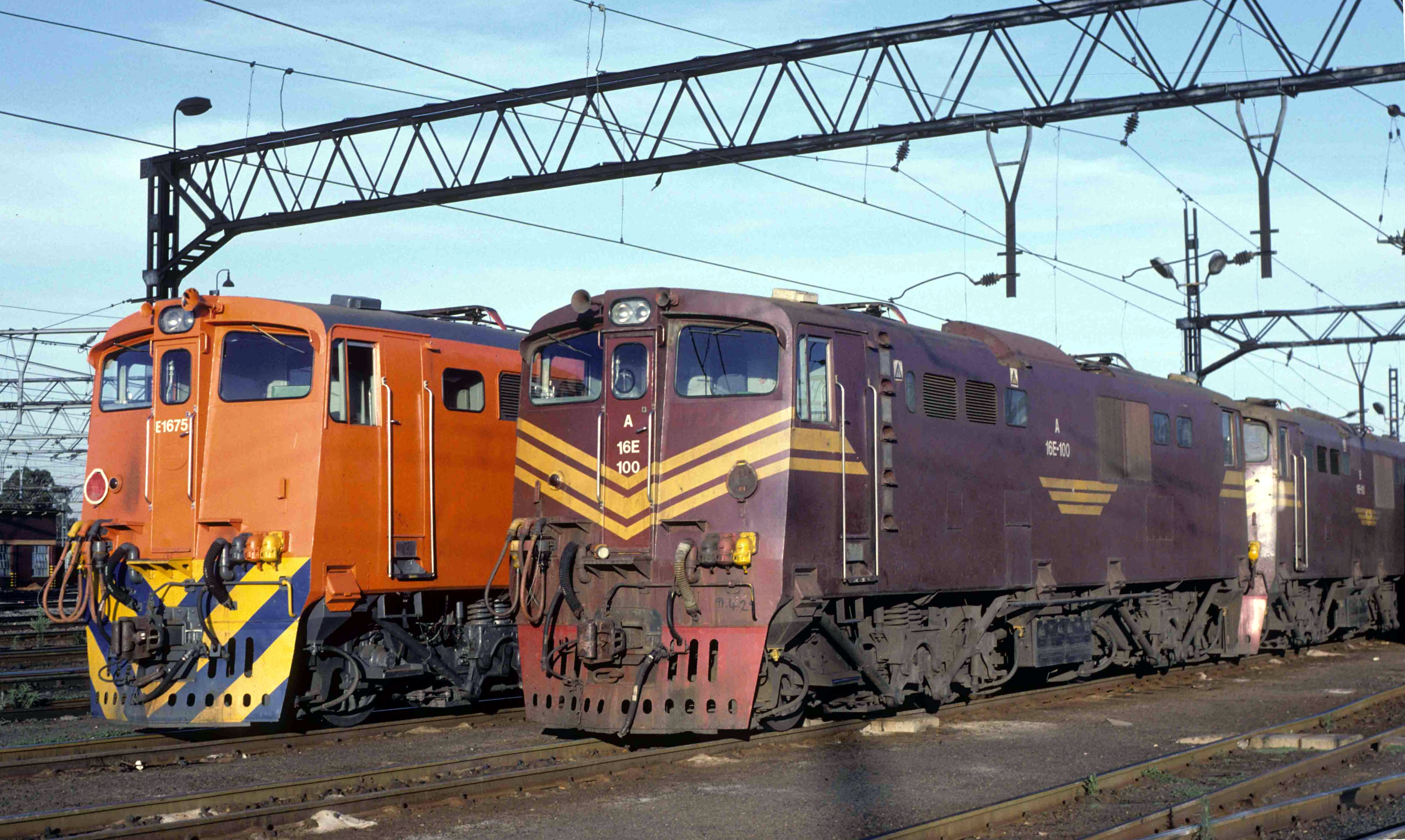
No. E1272, at right, as Class 16E no. 16-100A, Germiston, 21 November 1991

During 1990 and 1991, Spoornet semi-permanently coupled several pairs of otherwise largely unmodified Class 6E1 units, reclassified them to Class 16E and allocated a single locomotive number to each pair, with the individual units in the pairs inscribed "A" or "B". The aim was to accomplish savings on cab maintenance by coupling the locomotives at their no. 1 ends, abandoning the no. 1 end cabs in terms of maintenance and using only the no. 2 end cabs.

One such pair was made up of two Series 2 units, numbers E1272 and E1273 which became Class 16E no. 16-100A and B respectively.

=== Rebuilding to Class 18E ===
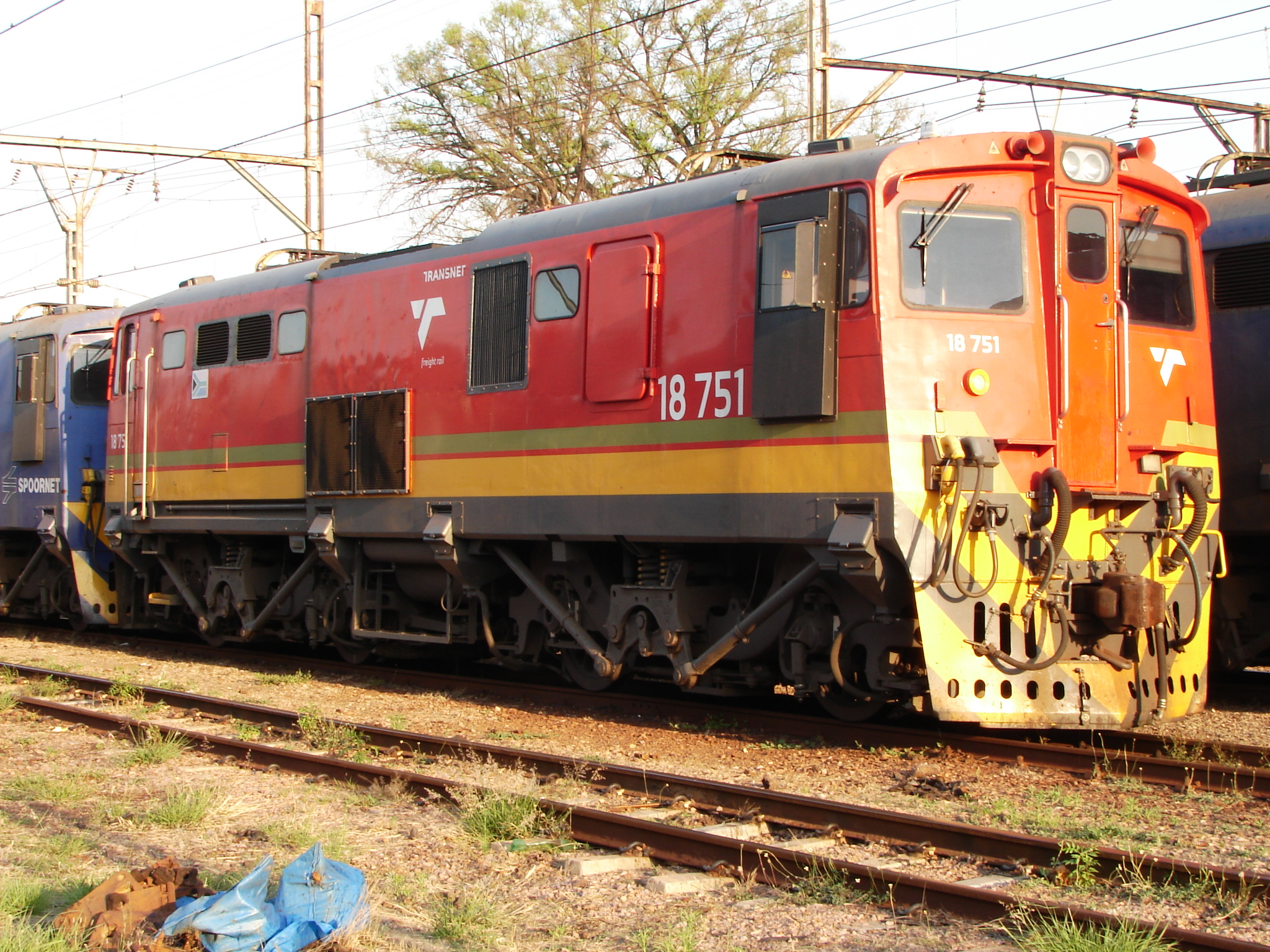
Class 18E no. 18-751, ex Class 6E1 no. E1268, Capital Park, 26 September 2015

Beginning in 2000, Spoornet began a project to rebuild Series 2 to 11 Class 6E1 units to Class 18E, Series 1 and Series 2 at the Transnet Rail Engineering (TRE) workshops at Koedoespoort. In the process the cab at the no. 1 end was stripped of all controls to have a toilet installed, thereby forfeiting the unit's bi-directional ability. Since the driving cab's noise level had to be below 85 decibels, cab 2 was selected as the Class 18E driving cab primarily based on its lower noise level compared to cab 1, which is closer and more exposed to the compressor's noise and vibration. Another factor was the closer proximity of cab 2 to the low voltage switch panel. The fact that the handbrake was located in cab 2 was not a deciding factor, but was considered an additional benefit.

The known Class 6E1, Series 2 locomotives which were used in this project, were all rebuilt to Class 18E, Series 2. Their numbers and renumbering details are listed in the table.

Class 6E1, Series 2 units rebuilt to Class 18E as on 19 January 2015
Count	6E1 no.	Year built	18E no.	18E series	Year rebuilt	Notes
1	E1259	1971	18-426	2	2013	PRASA
2	E1261	1971	18-824	2	2015	
3	E1265	1971	18-752	2	2013	
4	E1268	1971	18-751	2	2013	
5	E1277	1971	18-801	2	2014	c. 2014

== Liveries ==
The whole series was delivered in the SAR Gulf Red livery with signal red cowcatchers, yellow whiskers and with the number plates on the sides mounted on three-stripe yellow wings. In the 1990s many of the Series 2 units began to be repainted in the Spoornet orange livery with a yellow and blue chevron pattern on the cowcatchers. In the late 1990s at least one was repainted in the Spoornet blue livery with outline numbers.

== Illustration ==
The main picture shows no. E1252 in Spoornet's orange livery at Sentrarand locomotive depot in Gauteng.

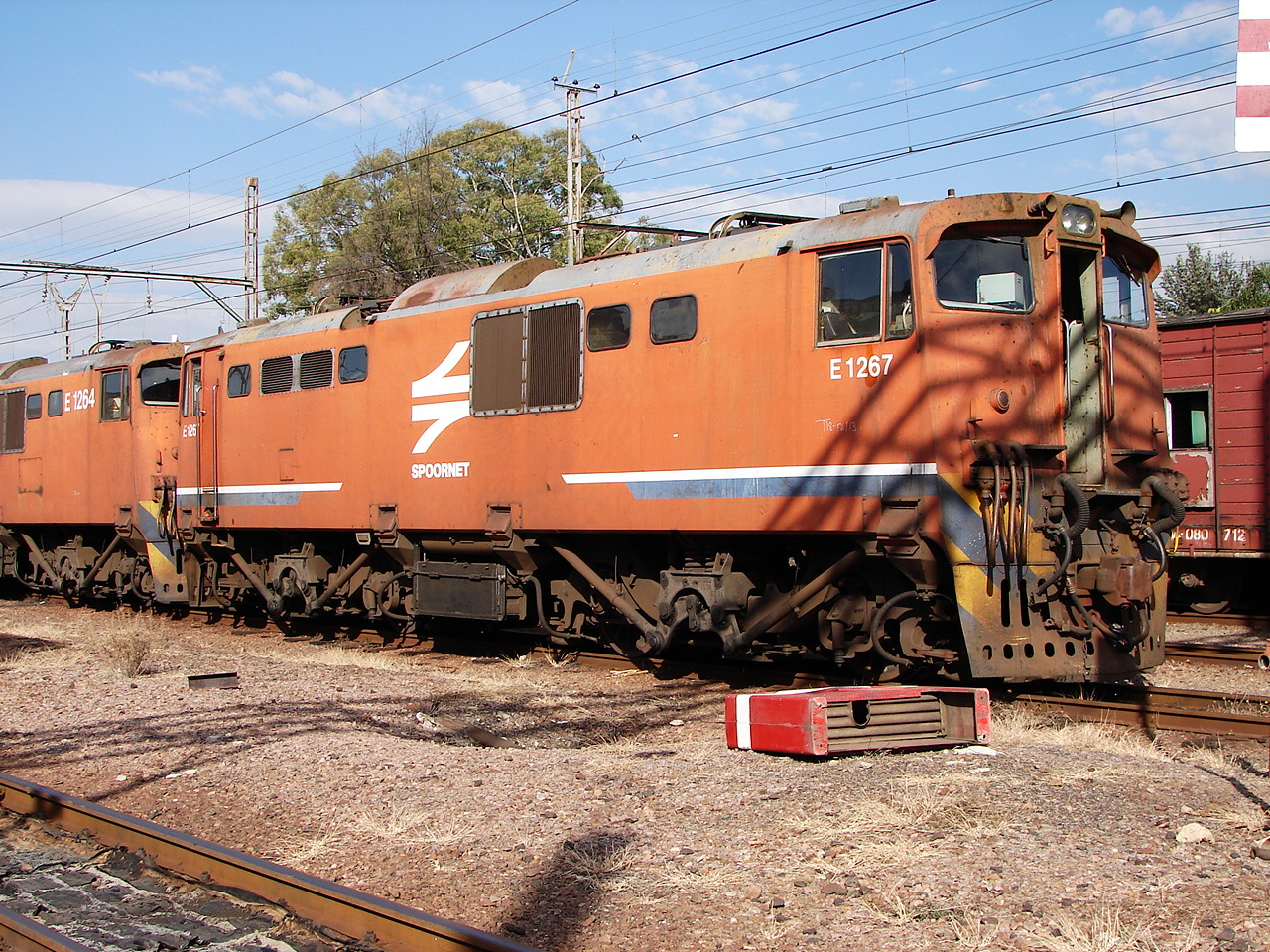
No. E1267 in Spoornet's lined orange livery at Capital Park Depot, Pretoria, 10 May 2013

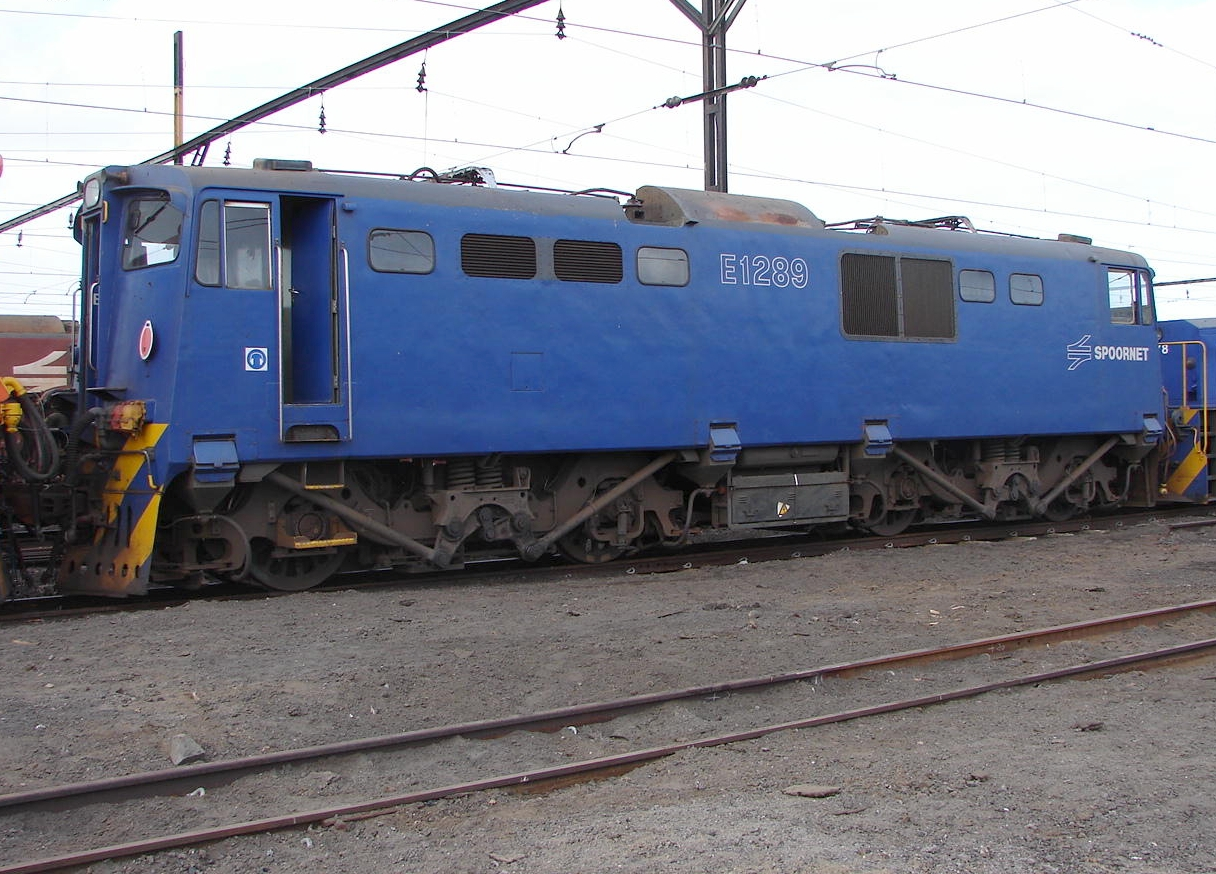
No. E1289 in Spoornet's blue livery with outline numbers at Bayhead Depot, Durban, 11 August 2007
