= South African Class 18E, Series 2 =

2009 design of electric locomotive

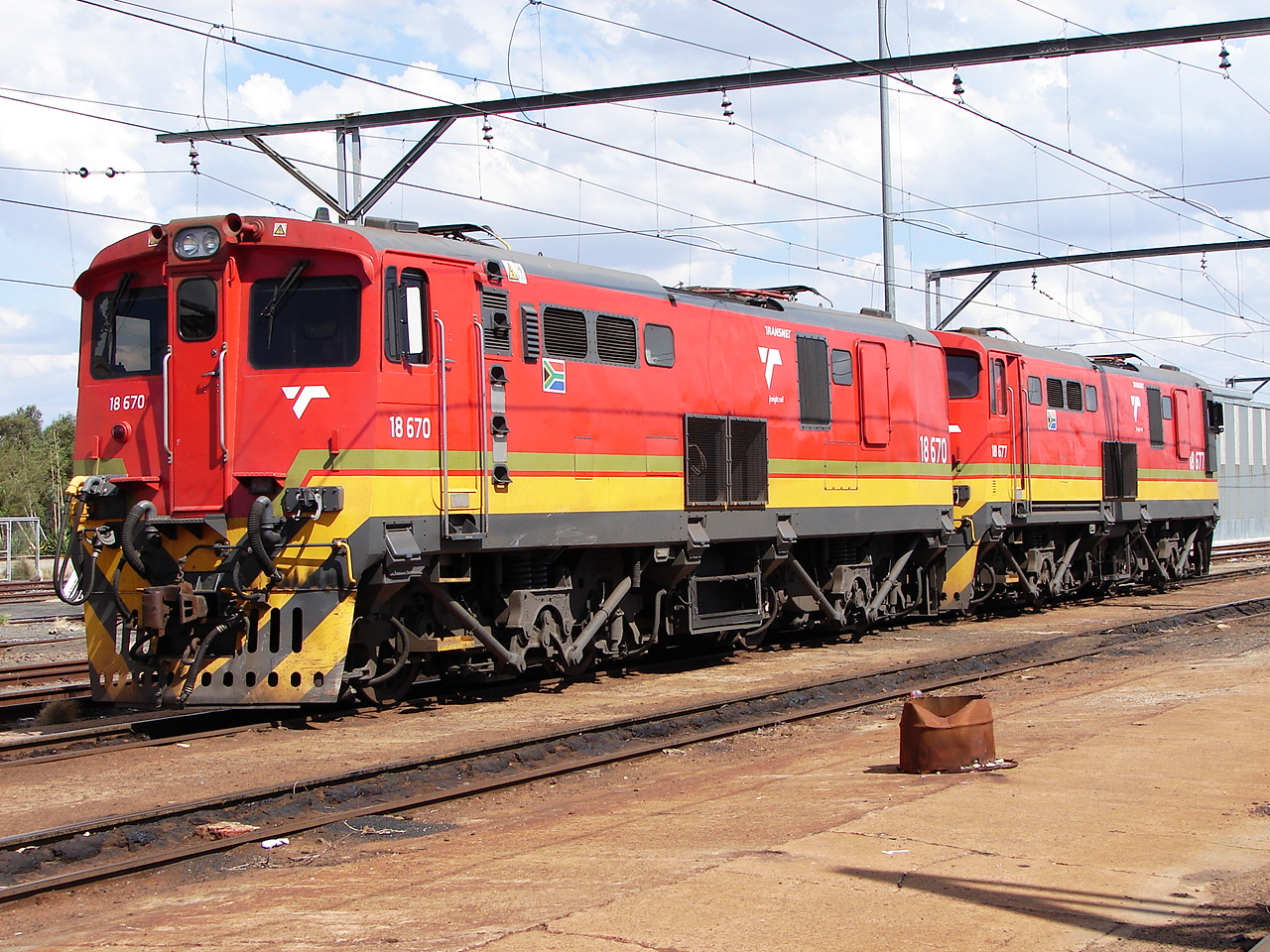
- 18-670 at Beaufort West, 27 March 2013
Type and origin
- Power type: Electric
- Designer: Union Carriage & Wagon
- Builder: Transnet Rail Engineering
- Model: Spoornet 18E
- Build date: 2009-2015
- Total produced: 279
Specifications
- Configuration
  - AAR: B-B
  - UIC: Bo'Bo'
  - Commonwealth: Bo-Bo
- Gauge: 3 ft 6 in (1,067 mm) Cape gauge
- Wheel diameter: 1,220 mm (48.0 in)
- Wheelbase: 11,279 mm (37 ft 0.1 in)
  - Bogie: 3,430 mm (11 ft 3.0 in)
- Pivot centres: 7,849 mm (25 ft 9.0 in)
- Panto shoes: 6,972 mm (22 ft 10.5 in)
- Length
  - Over couplers: 15,494 mm (50 ft 10.0 in)
  - Over body: 14,631 mm (48 ft 0 in)
- Width: 2,896 mm (9 ft 6.0 in)
- Height
  - Pantograph: 4,089 mm (13 ft 5.0 in)
  - Body height: 3,937 mm (12 ft 11.0 in)
- Loco weight: 88,904 kg (196,000 lb) max
- Electric system/s: 3 kV DC catenary
- Current pickup(s): Pantographs
- Traction motors: Four AEI-283AY
- Gear ratio: 18:67
- Loco brake: Air & Rheostatic
- Train brakes: Air & Vacuum
- Couplers: AAR knuckle
Career
- Operators: Transnet Freight Rail; Passenger Rail Agency of South Africa
- Class: Class 18E
- Number in class: 279
- Numbers: 18-421 to 18-435, 18-600 to 18-863
- Delivered: 2009-2015
- First run: 2009

The Transnet Freight Rail Class 18E, Series 2 of 2009 is a South African electric locomotive.

In 2000, Spoornet embarked on a program to rebuild Class 6E1, Series 6 to 11 locomotives to Class 18E, Series 1 locomotives. Most of the Class 6E1s which had previously been reclassified or modified to Class 16E or Class 17E respectively were rebuilt to Class 18E as well. Rebuilding to Series 1 locomotives ceased in 2009, with 446 units rebuilt.

Commencing in late 2009, all further rebuilt Class 6E1 locomotives for Transnet Freight Rail and the Passenger Rail Agency of South Africa were designated Class 18E, Series 2. These were rebuilt from Class 6E1, Series 2 to 8 locomotives and from one Class 18E, Series 1.

== Manufacturer ==
The 3 kV DC Class 6E1 electric locomotive was built for the South African Railways (SAR) by Union Carriage & Wagon (UCW) in Nigel, Transvaal, with the electrical equipment supplied by the General Electric Company (GEC). Eleven series of Class 6E1 were delivered between 1969 and 1984, with altogether 960 units built.

== Rebuilding ==
Rebuilding to Class 18E, Series 1 locomotives ceased in 2009 with 446 units rebuilt, the last Series 1 locomotive being no. 18-525. The rebuilding to Class 18E, Series 2 locomotives commenced in late 2009 and was done by Transnet Rail Engineering (TRE), now Transnet Engineering (TE), at its Koedoespoort shops in Pretoria. For Transnet Freight Rail locomotives, the Series 2 number range begins with no. 18-600.

In 2012 and 2013, fifteen Series 2 locomotives were also rebuilt for the Passenger Rail Agency of South Africa (PRASA). These were numbered in the range from 18-421 to 18-435 and were delivered in a new light blue and charcoal livery designed by Peter Stow.

By the time the rebuilding to Class 18E, Series 1 ceased, all available Class 6E1, Series 9 to 11, nearly all Series 8 and several Series 6 and 7 locomotives had been rebuilt. Most of the Class 18E, Series 2 locomotives were therefore rebuilt from Class 6E1, Series 2 to 7 locomotives and two Series 8 locomotives.

== Batteries ==
Beginning in 2009, before rebuilding to Series 2 commenced and in an attempt to reduce theft, the 110 V battery bank was relocated from the locomotive sides below the frame and between the bogies to cab 1, where the toilet occupies less than half of the available space. On the Series 1 locomotives, this appears to have been done only with numbers 18-510 and later. Identifying features are a small grille to the left of the cab 1 side door and, in most cases, the remaining battery box frames without side covers.

== Appearance ==
=== Identifying features ===
The most obvious visual feature to distinguish the Class 18E from the Class 6E1, is the filled in driver’s windows at the rear end where the toilet is installed. The remaining rear windscreen still has the slanted upper edge of the Class 6E1 windscreens, but the new front windscreens on the Class 18E are rectangular.

On the sides, obvious visual distinctions from the Class 6E1 are the left one of the two large grilles, which was removed and the opening filled in, two new large grilles which are installed in the centre lower sides to serve as air intakes for the rheostatic braking resistance blowers, and a large access door to one of the high-tension compartments, which was installed in place of the rightmost small window which was in the upper sides of the Class 6E1, to the rear of the driver's window. On the left side, the air intakes for the air conditioner in the cab are installed between the top three steps of the roof access ladder.

Locomotives rebuilt from Class 6E1, Series 2 to 7, have part of the compressed air piping sunk into a recess which runs along the left half of the lower edge of the body on the locomotive’s right side, the side opposite the roof access ladder side. This pipe was not rerouted on locomotives rebuilt from Class 6E1, Series 8.

=== Lineage identification ===
All features which distinguished Class 6E1, Series 8 or older locomotives from each other are still present on the Class 18E rebuilds, in many instances making it possible to visually determine the Class 6E1 origin of a Class 18E locomotive. Examples are shown in the pictures below. Some of these spotting features are:

- The side doors with:
  - mid-door mounted door handles on ex Series 2 to early Series 7 locomotives; and
  - low mounted handles with a mid-door drawer pull type handle at mid-door level on ex late Series 7 and Series 8 locomotives.
- On ex Series 8 locomotives, the large hatch door on each side, below the second small window to the right of the side door on the roof access ladder side, and below the first window immediately to the right of the side door on the opposite side.

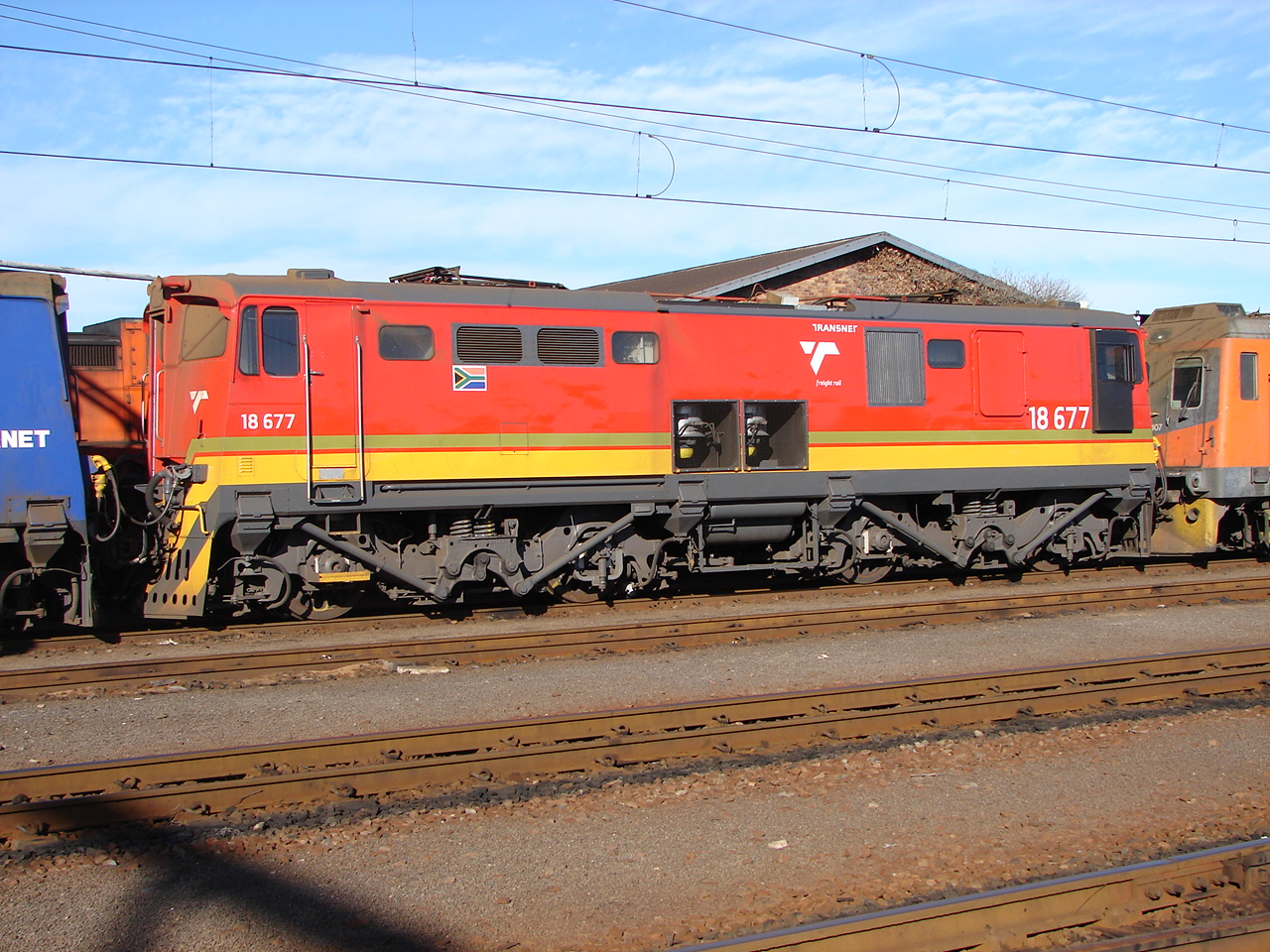
No. 18-677, ex Series 3 no. E1322, with narrow stirrup step

- On ex Series 6 and 7 locomotives, the smooth sides without hatch doors and the rainwater beading above the small grilles on the sides, just to the right of the side doors. On some ex Series 6 or later locomotives which have been observed, however, this beading is absent, possibly because it had been removed for some reason.
- On locomotives rebuilt from series 2 to 7, the recessed pipe on the right side.
- On ex Series 2 to 5 locomotives, the absence of the rainwater beading above the small grilles on the sides just to the right of the side doors.
- On locomotives rebuilt from Series 2, and series 3 in the number range from E1296 to E1345, the narrower stirrup middle step below the side doors.

== Project termination ==
The rebuilding project was abruptly terminated in January 2015, with 31 locomotives still on the Class 18E rebuilding line at Koedoespoort, possibly to vacate the assembly line for the construction of the new Classes 21E and 22E locomotives. Of these uncompleted locomotives, three were dispatched to Transwerk's Durban shops for their rebuilding to be completed, while those Class 6E1s which were still on the stripping, shell rewiring and equipment installation production lines were to be removed and scrapped. The last Class 18E to be completed at Koedoespoort was no. 18-863.

== Table of rebuilds ==
With one exception, all the Class 18E, Series 2 locomotives were rebuilt from Class 6E1, Series 2 to 8 locomotives. No. 18-862 was rebuilt from the scrapped Class 18E, Series 1 no. 18-040, which had originally been rebuilt from Class 6E1, Series 10 no. E2131 in 2002.

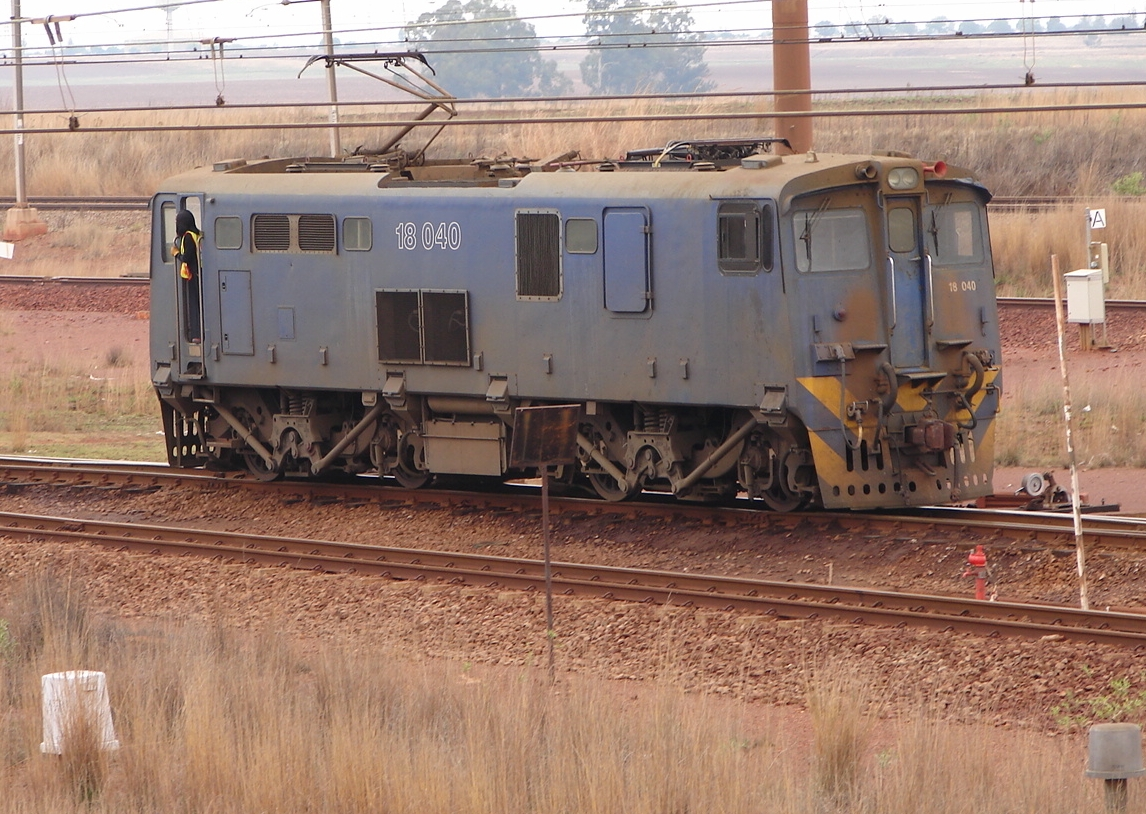
Class 18E, Series 1 no. 18-040

Since TFR, PRASA and TE are separate corporate entities, serviceable Class 6E1 locomotives for rebuilding are sold to TE and rebuilt Class 18E locomotives are then sold back to TFR or PRASA. Profit-wise, it is to TE's benefit to also use the shells of wrecked or burnt locomotives to rebuild, depending on the condition of the shell. Since 2003, when Series 1 numbers 18-066 and 18-075 were built from burnt Class 6E1 shells, several locomotives had therefore been rebuilt from wrecked or burnt and scrapped shells.

No. 18-040 had been left parked on a siding in the veld. When a crew went back to start it, they found virtually an empty shell, completely stripped by metal thieves. Since TFR considered the locomotive not economically repairable, it was scrapped. The shell, with the bogies, was bought by TE since it was already modified to the Class 18E specifications, and was used to build no. 18-862. Since it had been scrapped, the 18-040 number could not be used again.

The table shows the original Class 6E1 number, series and year built for each Class 18E, Series 2 locomotive, as well as the year it was rebuilt to Class 18E. All the table columns are sortable.

Class 6E1 units rebuilt to Class 18E, Series 2 (Incomplete list) as on 19 January 2015
| Count | 6E1 no. | 6E1 ser. | Year built | 18E no. | Year rebuilt | Notes |
|---|---|---|---|---|---|---|
| 1 | E1452 | 4 | 1973 | 18-421 | 2012 | PRASA |
| 2 | E1437 | 3 | 1973 | 18-422 | 2012 | PRASA |
| 3 | E1414 | 3 | 1973 | 18-423 | 2012 | PRASA |
| 4 | E1490 | 4 | 1973-74 | 18-424 | 2012 | PRASA |
| 5 | E1460 | 4 | 1973 | 18-425 | 2012 | PRASA |
| 6 | E1259 | 2 | 1971 | 18-426 | 2013 | PRASA |
| 7 | E1385 | 3 | 1972 | 18-427 | 2013 | PRASA |
| 8 | E1481 | 4 | 1973-74 | 18-428 | 2012 | PRASA |
| 9 | E1459 | 4 | 1973 | 18-429 | 2013 | PRASA |
| 10 | E1397 | 3 | 1972-73 | 18-430 | 2013 | PRASA |
| 11 | E1834 | 7 | 1978 | 18-431 | 2013 | PRASA |
| 12 | E1434 | 3 | 1973 | 18-432 | 2013 | PRASA |
| 13 | E1467 | 4 | 1973 | 18-433 | 2013 | PRASA |
| 14 | E1379 | 3 | 1972 | 18-434 | 2013 | PRASA |
| 15 | E1300 | 3 | 1971-72 | 18-435 | 2013 | PRASA |
| 16 | E1703 | 6 | 1976-77 | 18-600 | 2009 | |
| 17 | E1791 | 7 | 1977-78 | 18-601 | 2009 | |
| 18 | E1715 | 6 | 1977 | 18-602 | 2009 | |
| 19 | E1767 | 7 | 1977 | 18-603 | 2009 | |
| 20 | E1741 | 6 | 1977 | 18-604 | 2009 | |
| 21 | E1768 | 7 | 1977 | 18-605 | 2010 | |
| 22 | E1877 | 7 | 1979 | 18-606 | 2009 | |
| 23 | E1762 | 7 | 1977 | 18-607 | 2009 | |
| 24 | E1896 | 8 | 1979 | 18-608 | 2010 | |
| 25 | E1882 | 7 | 1979 | 18-609 | 2009 | |
| 26 | E1823 | 7 | 1977-78 | 18-610 | 2010 | |
| 27 | E1677 | 6 | 1976 | 18-611 | 2010 | |
| 28 | E1809 | 7 | 1977-78 | 18-612 | 2009 | |
| 29 | E1820 | 7 | 1977-78 | 18-613 | 2010 | |
| 30 | E1680 | 6 | 1976 | 18-614 | 2010 | |
| 31 | E1824 | 7 | 1977-78 | 18-615 | 2009 | |
| 32 | E1884 | 7 | 1979 | 18-616 | 2010 | |
| 33 | E1739 | 6 | 1977 | 18-617 | 2010 | |
| 34 | E1806 | 7 | 1977-78 | 18-618 | 2010 | |
| 35 | E1719 | 6 | 1977 | 18-619 | 2010 | |
| 36 | E1737 | 6 | 1977 | 18-620 | 2010 | |
| 37 | E1660 | 6 | 1976 | 18-621 | 2010 | |
| 38 | E1727 | 6 | 1977 | 18-622 | 2010 | |
| 39 | E1662 | 6 | 1976 | 18-623 | 2010 | |
| 40 | E1887 | 7 | 1979 | 18-624 | 2010 | |
| 41 | E1839 | 7 | 1978 | 18-625 | 2010 | |
| 42 | E1845 | 7 | 1978 | 18-626 | 2010 | |
| 43 | E1681 | 6 | 1976 | 18-627 | 2010 | |
| 44 | E1717 | 6 | 1977 | 18-628 | 2010 | |
| 45 | E1729 | 6 | 1977 | 18-629 | 2010 | |
| 46 | E1672 | 6 | 1976 | 18-630 | 2010 | |
| 47 | E1890 | 7 | 1979 | 18-631 | 2010 | |
| 48 | E1674 | 6 | 1976 | 18-632 | 2010 | |
| 49 | E1793 | 7 | 1977-78 | 18-633 | 2010 | |
| 50 | E1728 | 6 | 1977 | 18-634 | 2010 | |
| 51 | E1676 | 6 | 1976 | 18-635 | 2010 | |
| 52 | E1535 | 4 | 1974 | 18-636 | 2010 | |
| 53 | E1632 | 5 | 1976 | 18-637 | 2010 | |
| 54 | E1508 | 4 | 1974 | 18-638 | 2010 | |
| 55 | E1626 | 5 | 1976 | 18-639 | 2010 | |
| 56 | E1493 | 4 | 1973-74 | 18-640 | 2011 | |
| 57 | E1578 | 5 | 1975 | 18-641 | 2010 | |
| 58 | E1573 | 5 | 1975 | 18-642 | 2010 | |
| 59 | E1521 | 4 | 1974 | 18-643 | 2010 | |
| 60 | E1723 | 6 | 1977 | 18-644 | 2010 | |
| 61 | E1736 | 6 | 1977 | 18-645 | 2010 | |
| 62 | E1399 | 3 | 1973 | 18-646 | 2010 | |
| 63 | E1628 | 5 | 1976 | 18-647 | 2010 | |
| 64 | E1661 | 6 | 1976 | 18-648 | 2010 | |
| 65 | E1812 | 7 | 1977-78 | 18-649 | 2011 | |
| 66 | E1519 | 4 | 1974 | 18-650 | 2010 | |
| 67 | E1303 | 3 | 1971-72 | 18-651 | 2011 | |
| 68 | E1428 | 3 | 1973 | 18-652 | 2011 | |
| 69 | E1400 | 3 | 1973 | 18-653 | 2011 | |
| 70 | E1807 | 7 | 1977-78 | 18-654 | 2011 | |
| 71 | E1422 | 3 | 1973 | 18-655 | 2011 | |
| 72 | E1530 | 4 | 1974 | 18-656 | 2011 | |
| 73 | E1458 | 4 | 1973 | 18-657 | 2011 | |
| 74 | E1463 | 4 | 1973 | 18-658 | 2011 | |
| 75 | E1487 | 4 | 1973-74 | 18-659 | 2011 | |
| 76 | E1480 | 4 | 1973-74 | 18-660 | 2011 | |
| 77 | E1566 | 5 | 1975 | 18-661 | 2011 | |
| 78 | E1644 | 5 | 1976 | 18-662 | 2011 | |
| 79 | E1609 | 5 | 1975 | 18-663 | 2011 | |
| 80 | E1635 | 5 | 1976 | 18-664 | 2011 | |
| 81 | E1494 | 4 | 1974 | 18-665 | 2011 | |
| 82 | E1479 | 4 | 1973-74 | 18-666 | 2011 | |
| 83 | E1663 | 6 | 1976 | 18-667 | 2011 | |
| 84 | E1561 | 5 | 1975 | 18-668 | 2011 | |
| 85 | E1503 | 4 | 1974 | 18-669 | 2011 | |
| 86 | E1571 | 5 | 1975 | 18-670 | 2012 | |
| 87 | E1470 | 4 | 1973-74 | 18-671 | 2011 | |
| 88 | E1313 | 3 | 1971-72 | 18-672 | 2011 | |
| 89 | E1442 | 3 | 1973 | 18-673 | 2011 | |
| 90 | E1524 | 4 | 1974 | 18-674 | 2011 | |
| 91 | E1502 | 4 | 1974 | 18-675 | 2011 | |
| 92 | E1337 | 3 | 1972 | 18-676 | 2011 | |
| 93 | E1322 | 3 | 1971-72 | 18-677 | 2012 | |
| 94 | E1336 | 3 | 1972 | 18-678 | 2011 | |
| 95 | E1325 | 3 | 1971-72 | 18-679 | 2012 | |
| 96 | E1371 | 3 | 1972 | 18-680 | 2011 | |
| 97 | E1315 | 3 | 1971-72 | 18-681 | 2011 | |
| 98 | E1323 | 3 | 1971-72 | 18-682 | 2012 | |
| 99 | E1375 | 3 | 1972 | 18-683 | 2011 | |
| 100 | E1363 | 3 | 1972 | 18-684 | 2012 | |
| 101 | E1386 | 3 | 1972 | 18-685 | 2011 | |
| 102 | E1581 | 5 | 1975 | 18-686 | 2012 | |
| 103 | E1671 | 6 | 1976 | 18-687 | 2011 | |
| 104 | E1512 | 4 | 1974 | 18-688 | 2011 | |
| 105 | E1390 | 3 | 1972-73 | 18-689 | 2011 | |
| 106 | E1733 | 6 | 1977 | 18-690 | 2012 | |
| 107 | E1866 | 7 | 1978-79 | 18-691 | 2012 | |
| 108 | E1862 | 7 | 1978 | 18-692 | 2012 | |
| 109 | E1576 | 5 | 1975 | 18-693 | 2012 | |
| 110 | E1538 | 4 | 1974 | 18-694 | 2012 | |
| 111 | E1311 | 3 | 1971-72 | 18-695 | 2012 | |
| 112 | E1501 | 4 | 1974 | 18-696 | 2012 | |
| 113 | E1634 | 5 | 1976 | 18-697 | 2012 | |
| 114 | E1553 | 5 | 1974-75 | 18-698 | 2012 | |
| 115 | E1800 | 7 | 1977-78 | 18-699 | 2012 | |
| 116 | E1641 | 5 | 1976 | 18-700 | 2012 | |
| 117 | E1869 | 7 | 1978-79 | 18-701 | 2012 | |
| 118 | E1421 | 3 | 1973 | 18-702 | 2012 | |
| 119 | E1630 | 5 | 1976 | 18-703 | 2012 | |
| 120 | E1316 | 3 | 1971-72 | 18-704 | 2012 | |
| 121 | E1567 | 5 | 1975 | 18-705 | 2012 | |
| 122 | E1331 | 3 | 1972 | 18-706 | 2012 | |
| 123 | E1319 | 3 | 1971-72 | 18-707 | 2012 | |
| 124 | E1447 | 4 | 1973 | 18-708 | 2012 | |
| 125 | E1639 | 5 | 1976 | 18-709 | 2012 | |
| 126 | E1622 | 5 | 1976 | 18-710 | 2012 | |
| 127 | E1610 | 5 | 1975 | 18-711 | 2012 | |
| 128 | E1702 | 6 | 1976-77 | 18-712 | 2012 | |
| 129 | E1638 | 5 | 1976 | 18-713 | 2012 | |
| 130 | E1516 | 4 | 1974 | 18-714 | 2012 | |
| 131 | E1614 | 5 | 1975-76 | 18-715 | 2012 | |
| 132 | E1625 | 5 | 1976 | 18-716 | 2012 | |
| 133 | E1536 | 4 | 1974 | 18-717 | 2012 | |
| 134 | E1531 | 4 | 1974 | 18-718 | 2012 | |
| 135 | E1492 | 4 | 1973-74 | 18-719 | 2012 | |
| 136 | E1664 | 6 | 1976 | 18-720 | 2012 | |
| 137 | E1358 | 3 | 1972 | 18-721 | 2012 | |
| 138 | E1624 | 5 | 1976 | 18-722 | 2012 | |
| 139 | E1568 | 5 | 1975 | 18-723 | 2013 | |
| 140 | E1369 | 3 | 1972 | 18-724 | 2013 | |
| 141 | E1844 | 7 | 1978 | 18-725 | 2013 | |
| 142 | E1546 | 5 | 1974-75 | 18-726 | 2013 | |
| 143 | E1564 | 5 | 1975 | 18-727 | 2013 | |
| 144 | E1726 | 6 | 1977 | 18-728 | 2013 | |
| 145 | E1637 | 5 | 1976 | 18-729 | 2013 | |
| 146 | E1867 | 7 | 1978-79 | 18-730 | 2013 | |
| 147 | E1620 | 5 | 1975-76 | 18-731 | 2013 | |
| 148 | E1367 | 3 | 1972 | 18-732 | 2013 | |
| 149 | E1594 | 5 | 1975 | 18-733 | 2013 | |
| 150 | E1570 | 5 | 1975 | 18-734 | 2013 | |
| 151 | E1408 | 3 | 1973 | 18-735 | 2013 | |
| 152 | E1713 | 6 | 1976-77 | 18-736 | 2013 | |
| 153 | E1640 | 5 | 1976 | 18-737 | 2013 | |
| 154 | E1518 | 4 | 1974 | 18-738 | 2013 | |
| 155 | E1532 | 4 | 1974 | 18-739 | 2013 | |
| 156 | E1526 | 4 | 1974 | 18-740 | 2013 | |
| 157 | E1951 | 8 | 1980 | 18-741 | 2013 | |
| 158 | E1453 | 4 | 1973 | 18-742 | 2013 | |
| 159 | E1326 | 3 | 1971-72 | 18-743 | 2013 | |
| 160 | E1416 | 3 | 1973 | 18-744 | 2013 | |
| 161 | E1372 | 3 | 1972 | 18-745 | 2013 | |
| 162 | E1540 | 4 | 1974 | 18-746 | 2013 | |
| 163 | E1406 | 3 | 1973 | 18-747 | 2013 | |
| 164 | E1346 | 3 | 1972 | 18-748 | 2013 | |
| 165 | E1544 | 4 | 1974 | 18-749 | 2013 | |
| 166 | E1616 | 5 | 1975-76 | 18-750 | 2013 | |
| 167 | E1268 | 2 | 1971 | 18-751 | 2013 | |
| 168 | E1265 | 2 | 1971 | 18-752 | 2013 | |
| 169 | E1537 | 4 | 1974 | 18-753 | 2013 | |
| 170 | E1572 | 5 | 1975 | 18-754 | 2013 | |
| 171 | E1562 | 5 | 1975 | 18-755 | 2013 | |
| 172 | E1584 | 5 | 1975 | 18-756 | 2013 | |
| 173 | E1708 | 6 | 1976-77 | 18-757 | 2013 | |
| 174 | E1527 | 4 | 1974 | 18-758 | 2013 | |
| 175 | E1343 | 3 | 1972 | 18-759 | 2013 | |
| 176 | E1415 | 3 | 1973 | 18-760 | 2013 | |
| 177 | E1297 | 3 | 1971-72 | 18-761 | 2013 | |
| 178 | E1430 | 3 | 1973 | 18-762 | 2013 | |
| 179 | E1495 | 4 | 1974 | 18-763 | 2013 | |
| 180 | E1310 | 3 | 1971-72 | 18-764 | 2013 | |
| 181 | E1488 | 4 | 1973-74 | 18-765 | 2013 | |
| 182 | E1361 | 3 | 1972 | 18-766 | 2013 | |
| 183 | E1533 | 4 | 1974 | 18-767 | 2013 | |
| 184 | E1688 | 6 | 1976 | 18-768 | 2013 | |
| 185 | E1589 | 5 | 1975 | 18-769 | 2013 | |
| 186 | E1575 | 5 | 1975 | 18-770 | 2013 | |
| 187 | E1353 | 3 | 1972 | 18-771 | 2013 | |
| 188 | E1783 | 7 | 1977 | 18-772 | 2013 | |
| 189 | E1407 | 3 | 1973 | 18-773 | 2013 | |
| 190 | E1517 | 4 | 1974 | 18-774 | 2013 | circa 2013 |
| 191 | E1402 | 3 | 1973 | 18-775 | 2013 | circa 2013 |
| 192 | E1298 | 3 | 1971-72 | 18-776 | 2013 | circa 2013 |
| 193 | E1557 | 5 | 1975 | 18-777 | 2013 | circa 2013 |
| 194 | E1569 | 5 | 1975 | 18-778 | 2013 | circa 2013 |
| 195 | E1855 | 7 | 1978 | 18-779 | 2013 | circa 2013 |
| 196 | E1542 | 4 | 1974 | 18-780 | 2013 | circa 2013 |
| 197 | E1545 | 4 | 1974 | 18-781 | 2014 | circa 2014 |
| 198 | E1433 | 3 | 1973 | 18-782 | 2014 | circa 2014 |
| 199 | E1413 | 3 | 1973 | 18-783 | 2014 | circa 2014 |
| 200 | E1511 | 4 | 1974 | 18-784 | 2014 | circa 2014 |
| 201 | E1446 | 4 | 1973 | 18-785 | 2014 | circa 2014 |
| 202 | E1668 | 6 | 1976 | 18-786 | 2014 | circa 2014 |
| 203 | E1498 | 4 | 1974 | 18-787 | 2014 | circa 2014 |
| 204 | E1320 | 3 | 1971-72 | 18-788 | 2014 | circa 2014 |
| 205 | E1613 | 5 | 1975 | 18-789 | 2014 | circa 2014 |
| 206 | E1419 | 3 | 1973 | 18-790 | 2014 | circa 2014 |
| 207 | E1327 | 3 | 1971-72 | 18-791 | 2014 | circa 2014 |
| 208 | E1590 | 5 | 1975 | 18-792 | 2014 | circa 2014 |
| 209 | E1370 | 3 | 1972 | 18-793 | 2014 | circa 2014 |
| 210 | E1588 | 5 | 1975 | 18-794 | 2014 | circa 2014 |
| 211 | E1621 | 5 | 1976 | 18-795 | 2014 | circa 2014 |
| 212 | E1410 | 3 | 1973 | 18-796 | 2014 | circa 2014 |
| 213 | E1476 | 4 | 1973-74 | 18-797 | 2014 | circa 2014 |
| 214 | E1602 | 5 | 1975 | 18-798 | 2014 | circa 2014 |
| 215 | E1653 | 6 | 1976 | 18-799 | 2014 | circa 2014 |
| 216 | E1563 | 5 | 1975 | 18-800 | 2014 | circa 2014 |
| 217 | E1277 | 2 | 1971 | 18-801 | 2014 | circa 2014 |
| 218 | E1473 | 4 | 1973-74 | 18-802 | 2014 | circa 2014 |
| 219 | E1670 | 6 | 1976 | 18-803 | 2014 | circa 2014 |
| 220 | E1471 | 4 | 1973-74 | 18-804 | 2014 | circa 2014 |
| 221 | E1547 | 5 | 1974-75 | 18-805 | 2014 | |
| 222 | E1330 | 3 | 1972 | 18-806 | 2014 | |
| 223 | E1329 | 3 | 1972 | 18-807 | 2014 | |
| 224 | E1441 | 3 | 1973 | 18-808 | 2014 | |
| 225 | E1615 | 5 | 1975-76 | 18-809 | 2014 | |
| 226 | E1627 | 5 | 1976 | 18-810 | 2014 | |
| 227 | E1633 | 5 | 1976 | 18-811 | 2014 | |
| 228 | E1380 | 3 | 1972 | 18-812 | 2014 | |
| 229 | E1617 | 5 | 1975-76 | 18-813 | 2014 | |
| 230 | E1606 | 5 | 1975 | 18-814 | 2014 | |
| 231 | E1608 | 5 | 1975 | 18-815 | 2014 | |
| 232 | E1623 | 5 | 1976 | 18-816 | 2014 | |
| 233 | E1591 | 5 | 1975 | 18-817 | 2014 | |
| 234 | E1586 | 5 | 1975 | 18-818 | 2014 | |
| 235 | E1592 | 5 | 1975 | 18-819 | 2014 | |
| 236 | E1580 | 5 | 1975 | 18-820 | 2014 | |
| 237 | E1583 | 5 | 1975 | 18-821 | 2014 | |
| 238 | E1560 | 5 | 1975 | 18-822 | 2014 | |
| 239 | E1577 | 5 | 1975 | 18-823 | 2014 | |
| 240 | E1261 | 2 | 1971 | 18-824 | 2015 | |
| 241 | E1585 | 5 | 1975 | 18-825 | 2014 | |
| 242 | E1651 | 6 | 1976 | 18-826 | 2014 | |
| 243 | E1579 | 5 | 1975 | 18-827 | 2014 | |
| 244 | E1558 | 5 | 1975 | 18-828 | 2014 | |
| 245 | E1461 | 4 | 1973 | 18-829 | 2015 | |
| 246 | E1604 | 5 | 1975 | 18-830 | 2015 | |
| 247 | E1506 | 4 | 1974 | 18-831 | 2015 | |
| 248 | E1744 | 6 | 1977 | 18-832 | 2015 | |
| 249 | E1529 | 4 | 1974 | 18-833 | 2015 | |
| 250 | E1534 | 4 | 1974 | 18-834 | 2015 | |
| 251 | E1556 | 5 | 1974-75 | 18-835 | 2015 | |
| 252 | E1514 | 4 | 1974 | 18-836 | 2015 | |
| 253 | E1551 | 5 | 1974-75 | 18-837 | 2015 | |
| 254 | E1507 | 4 | 1974 | 18-838 | 2015 | |
| 255 | E1522 | 4 | 1974 | 18-839 | 2015 | |
| 256 | E1505 | 4 | 1974 | 18-840 | 2015 | |
| 257 | E1509 | 4 | 1974 | 18-841 | 2015 | |
| 258 | E1596 | 5 | 1975 | 18-842 | 2015 | |
| 259 | E1513 | 4 | 1974 | 18-843 | 2015 | |
| 260 | E1631 | 5 | 1976 | 18-844 | 2015 | |
| 261 | E1510 | 4 | 1974 | 18-845 | 2015 | |
| 262 | E1477 | 4 | 1973-74 | 18-846 | 2015 | |
| 263 | E1504 | 4 | 1974 | 18-847 | 2015 | |
| 264 | E1478 | 4 | 1973-74 | 18-848 | 2015 | |
| 265 | E1554 | 5 | 1974-75 | 18-849 | 2015 | |
| 266 | E1429 | 3 | 1973 | 18-850 | 2015 | |
| 267 | | | | 18-851 | 2015 | |
| 268 | E1484 | 4 | 1973-74 | 18-852 | 2015 | |
| 269 | E1520 | 4 | 1974 | 18-853 | 2015 | |
| 270 | E1486 | 4 | 1973-74 | 18-854 | 2015 | |
| 271 | E1451 | 4 | 1973-74 | 18-855 | 2015 | |
| 272 | E1483 | 4 | 1973-74 | 18-856 | 2015 | |
| 273 | E1469 | 4 | 1973-74 | 18-857 | 2015 | |
| 274 | E1423 | 3 | 1973 | 18-858 | 2015 | |
| 275 | E1444 | 3 | 1973 | 18-859 | 2015 | |
| 276 | E1405 | 3 | 1973 | 18-860 | 2015 | |
| 277 | E1305 | 3 | 1971-72 | 18-861 | 2015 | |
| 278 | 18-040 | 10 | 1984 | 18-862 | 2015 | ex E2131 |
| 279 | E1440 | 3 | 1973 | 18-863 | 2015 | |

== Illustration ==
The Class 6E1 series lineage identification features are illustrated in the following pictures. Note the external compressed air pipe on the right side of locomotives rebuilt from Class 6E1, Series 2 to 7.

Rebuilt from Class 6E1, Series 2

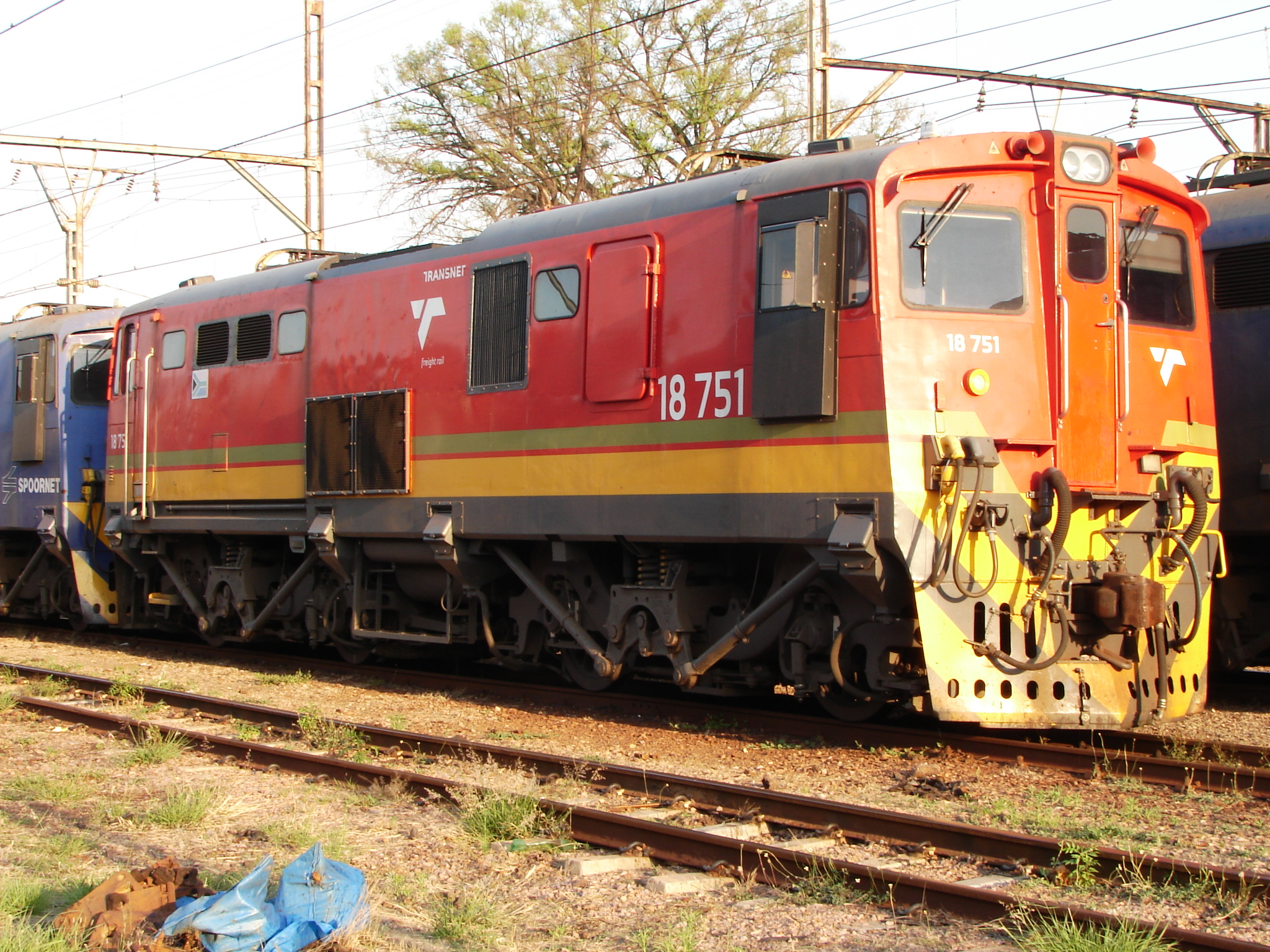
No. 18-751 (E1268) at Capital Park, Pretoria, 26 December 2015

Rebuilt from Class 6E1, Series 3

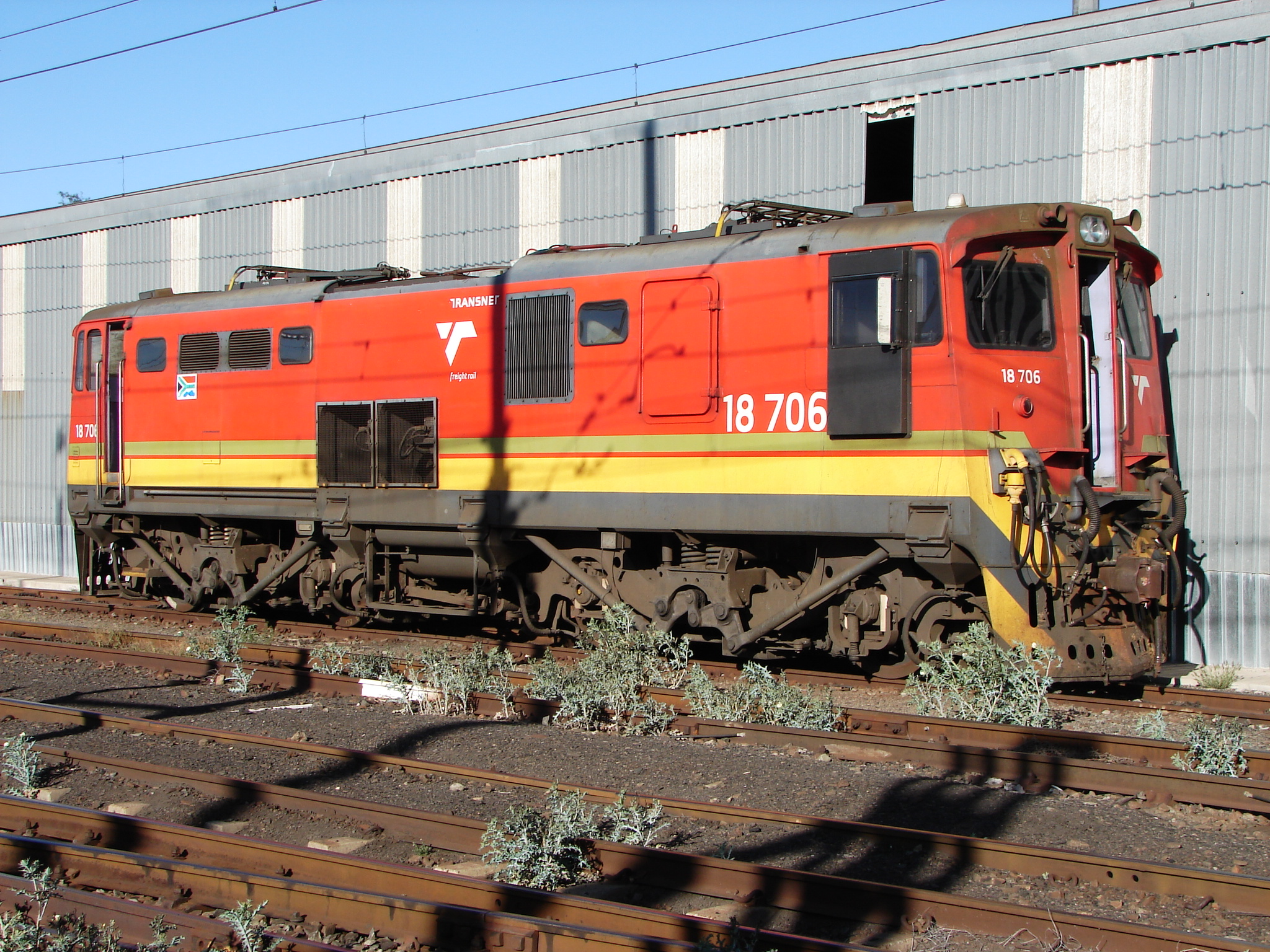
No. 18-706 (E1331) at Beaufort West, Western Cape, 10 October 2015

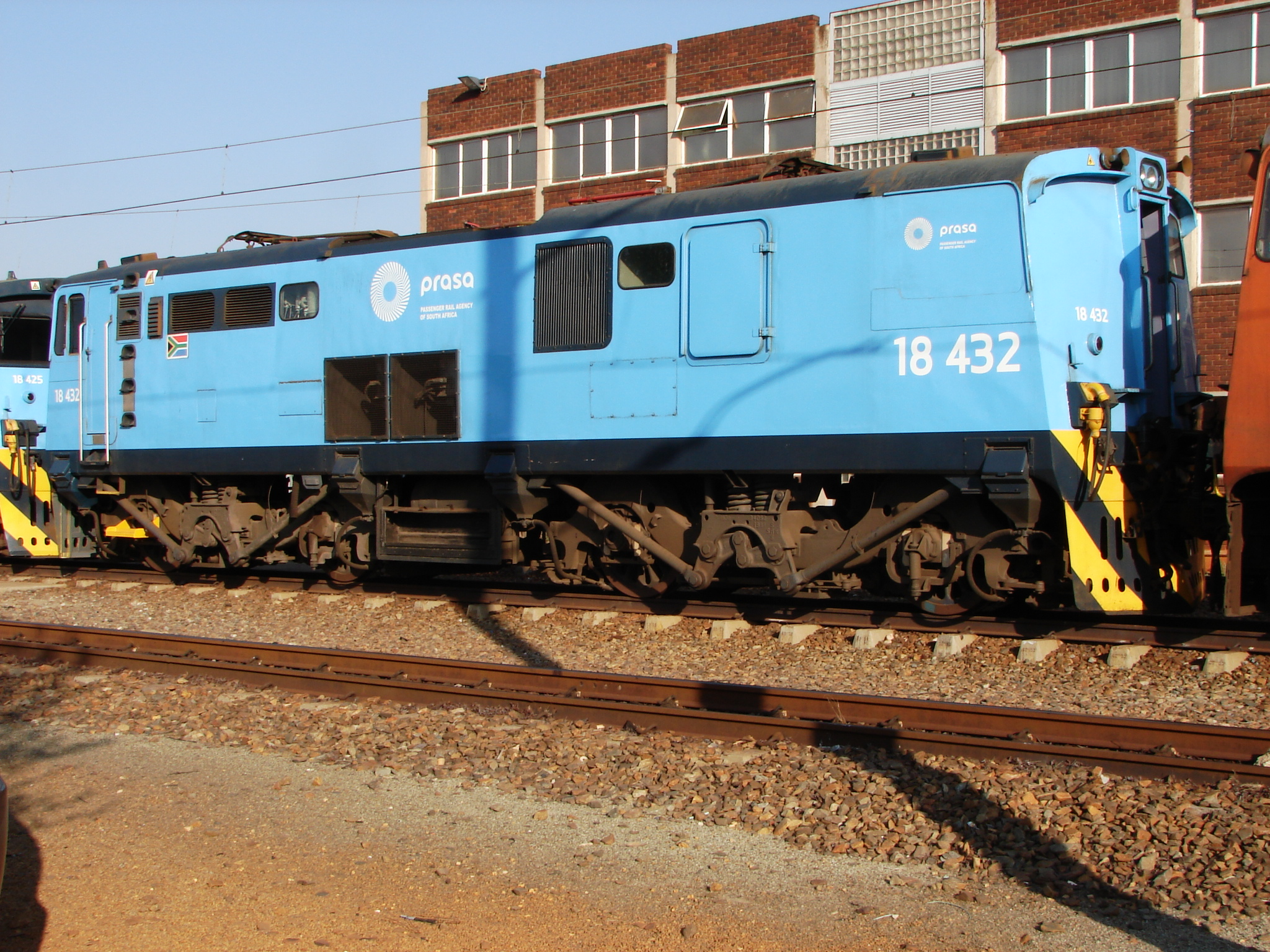
No. 18-432 (E1434) in PRASA blue livery at Sentrarand, 28 September 2015

Rebuilt from Class 6E1, Series 4

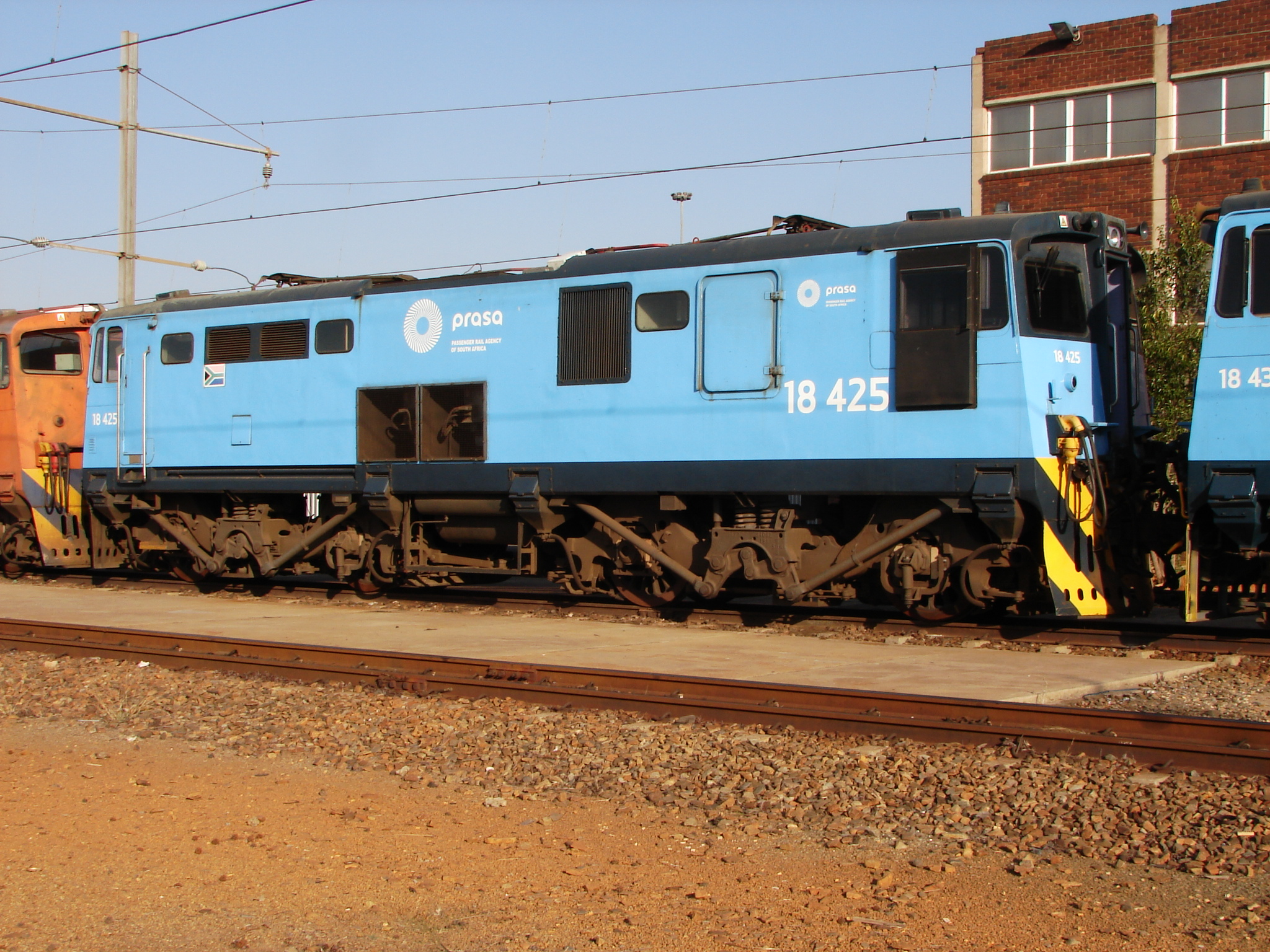
No. 18-425 (E1460) in PRASA blue livery at Sentrarand, 28 September 2015

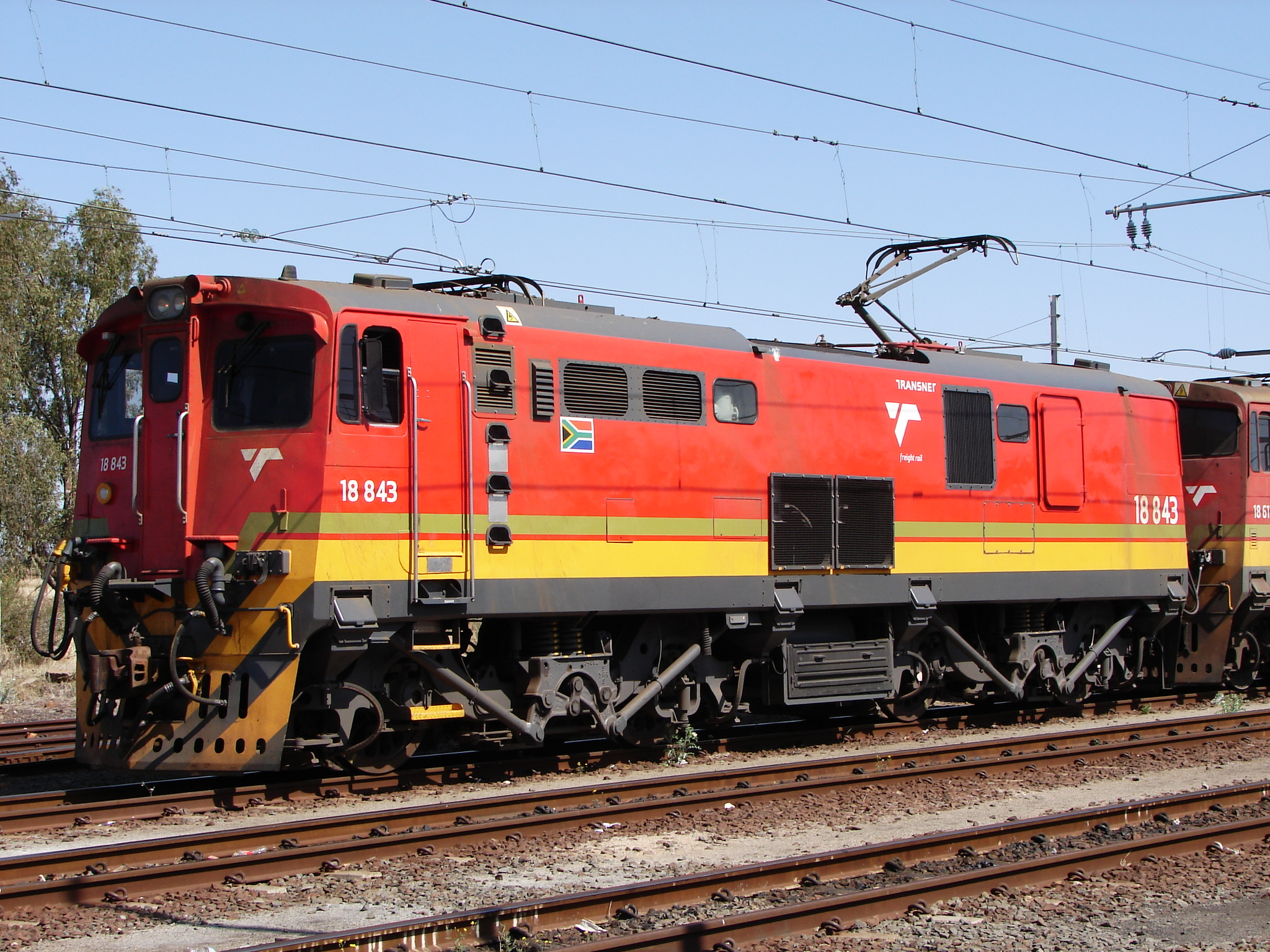
No. 18-843 (E1513) at Warrenton, Northern Cape, 19 September 2015

Rebuilt from Class 6E1, Series 5

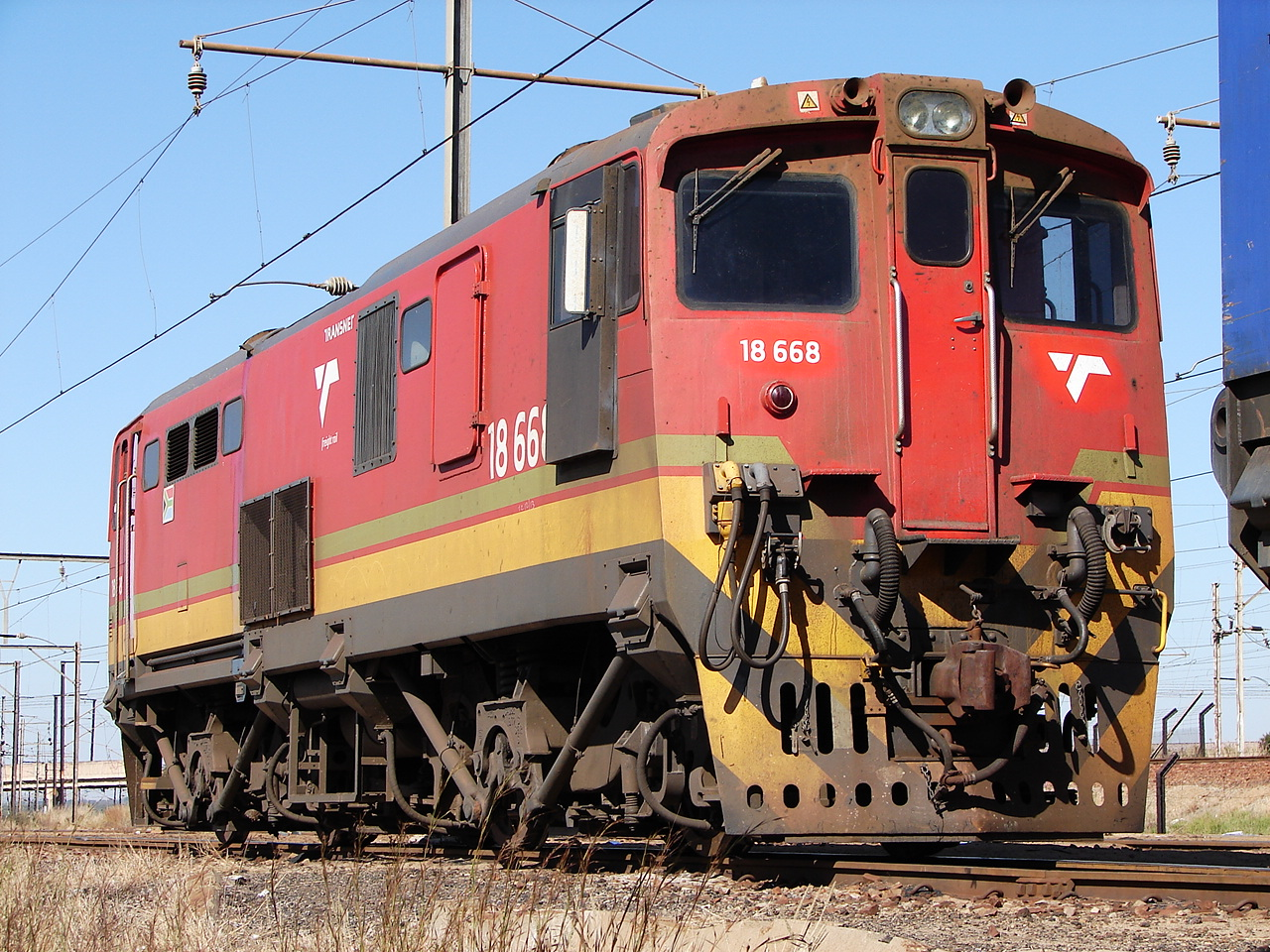
No. 18-668 (E1561) at Pyramid South, Gauteng, 7 May 2013

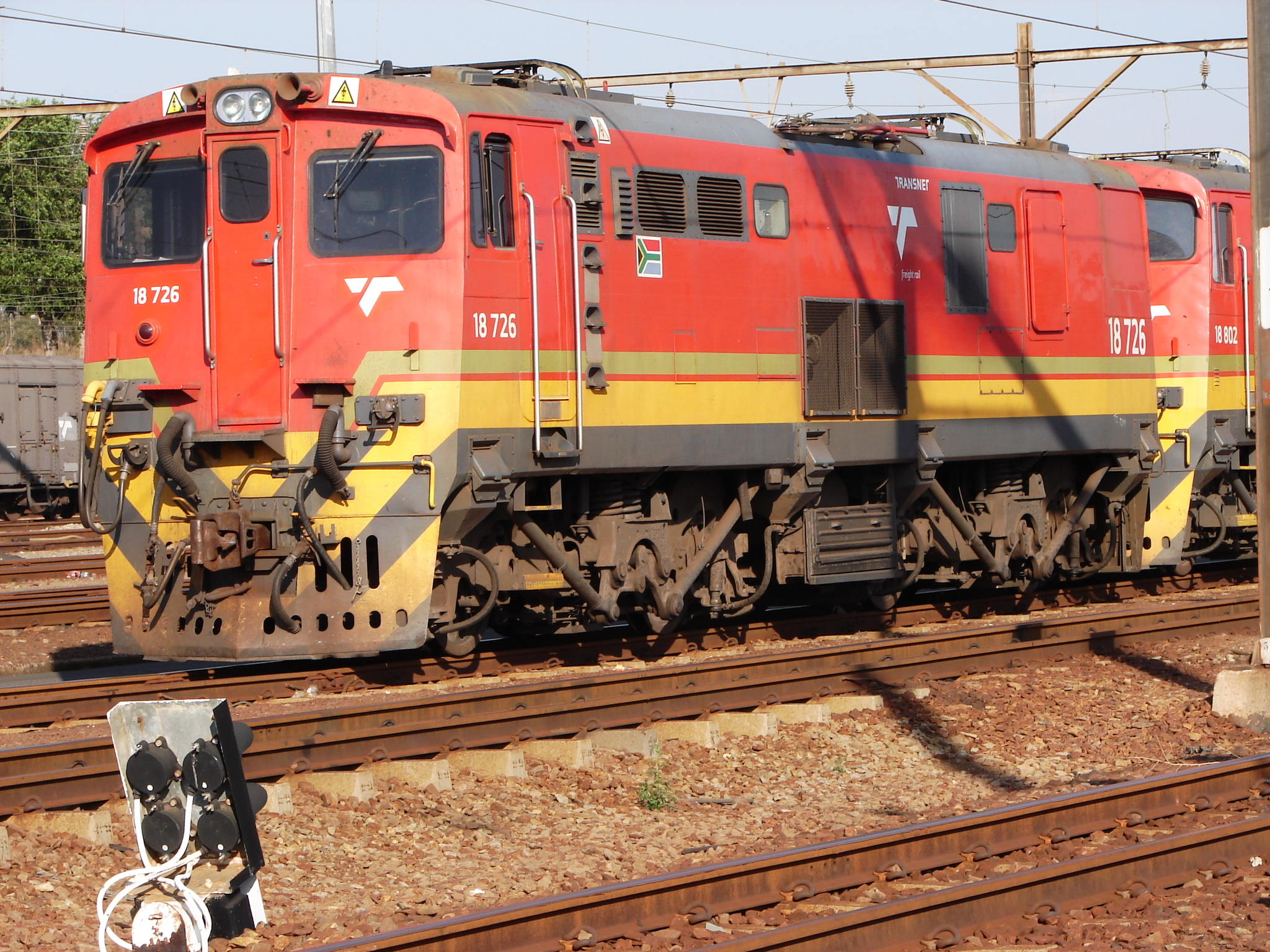
No. 18-725 (E1546) at Sentrarand, Gauteng, 28 September 2015

Rebuilt from Class 6E1, Series 6

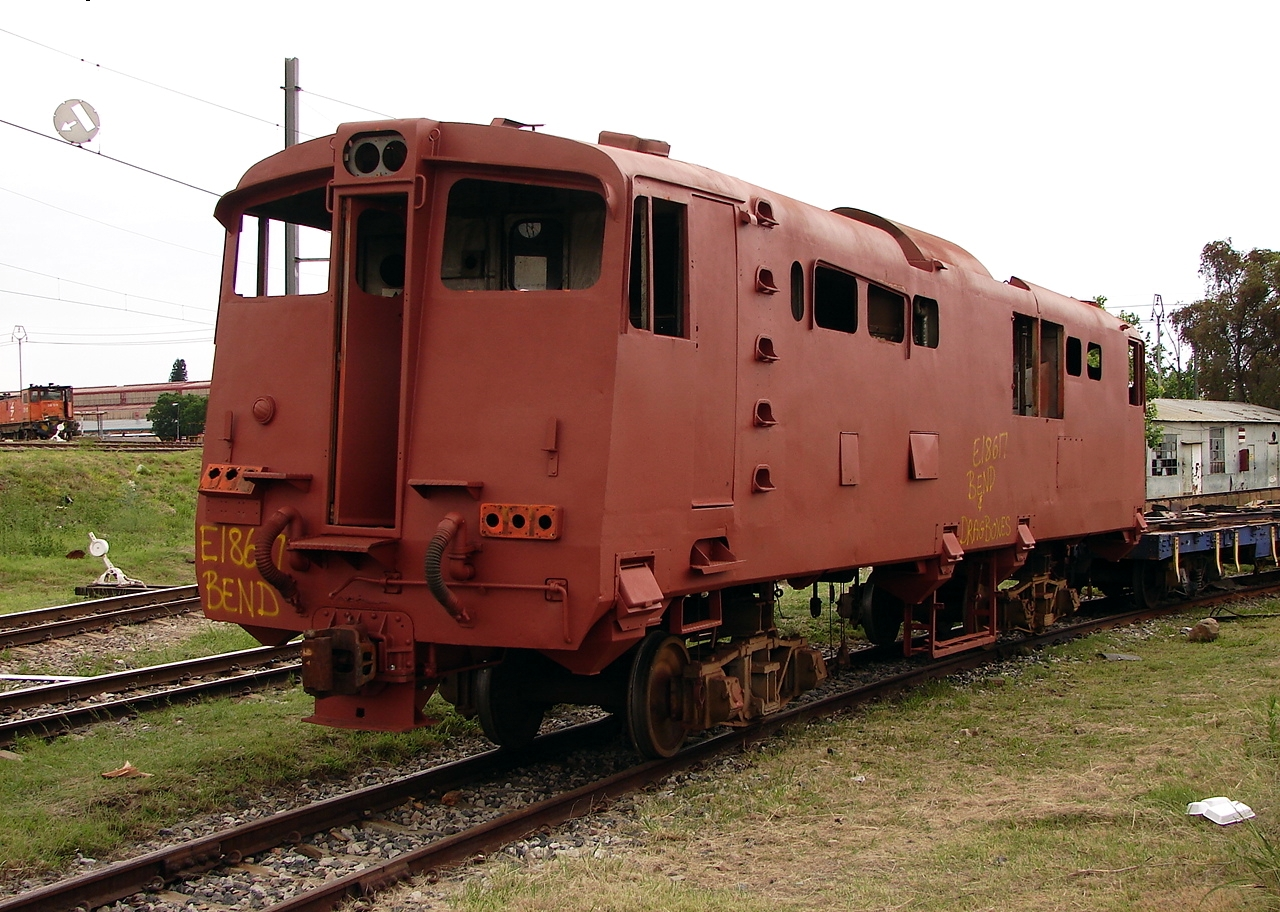
No. 18-617 (E1739) at Koedoespoort, Pretoria, 9 October 2009

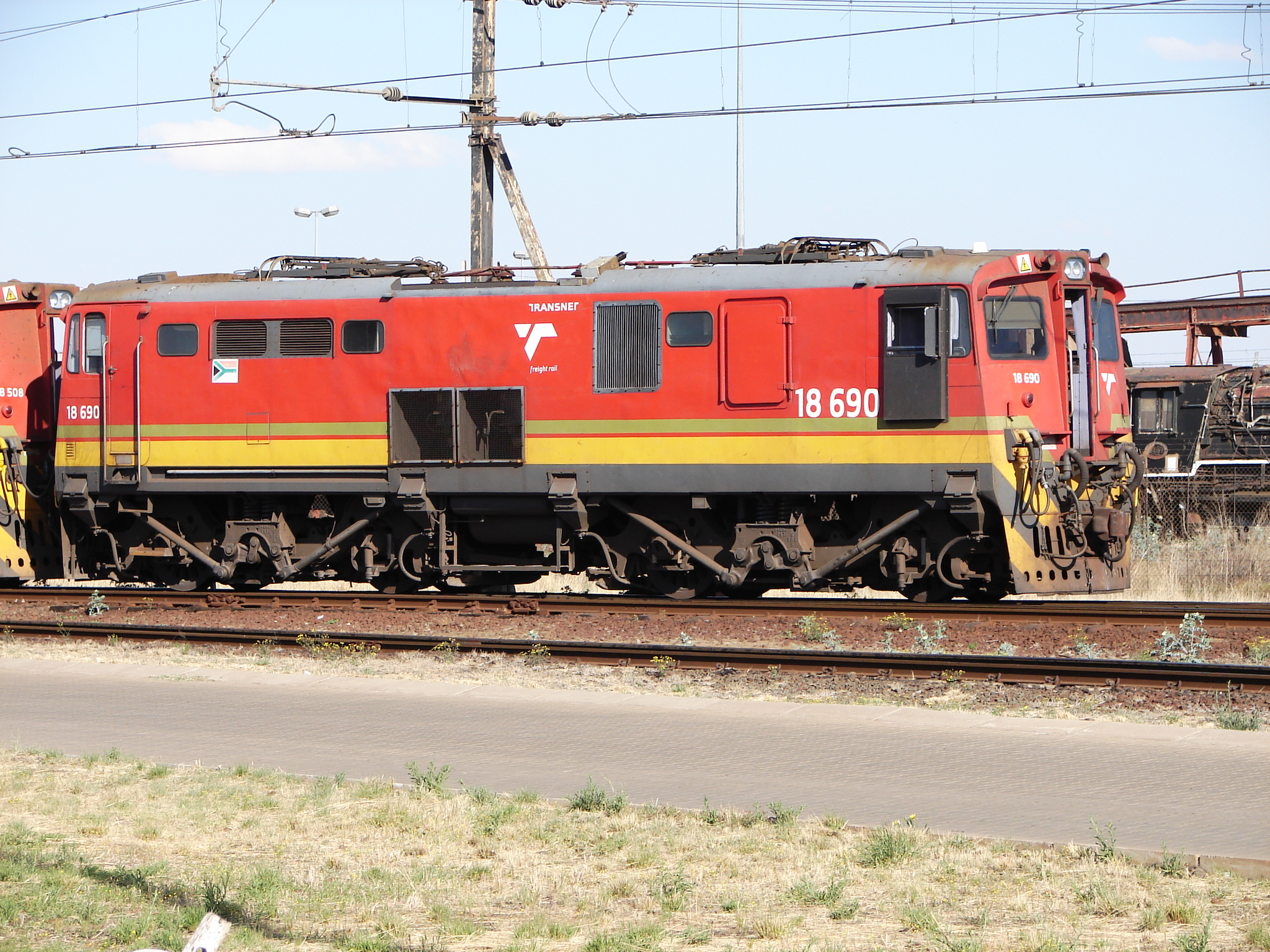
No. 18-690 (E1733) at Beaconsfield, Kimberley, 17 September 2015

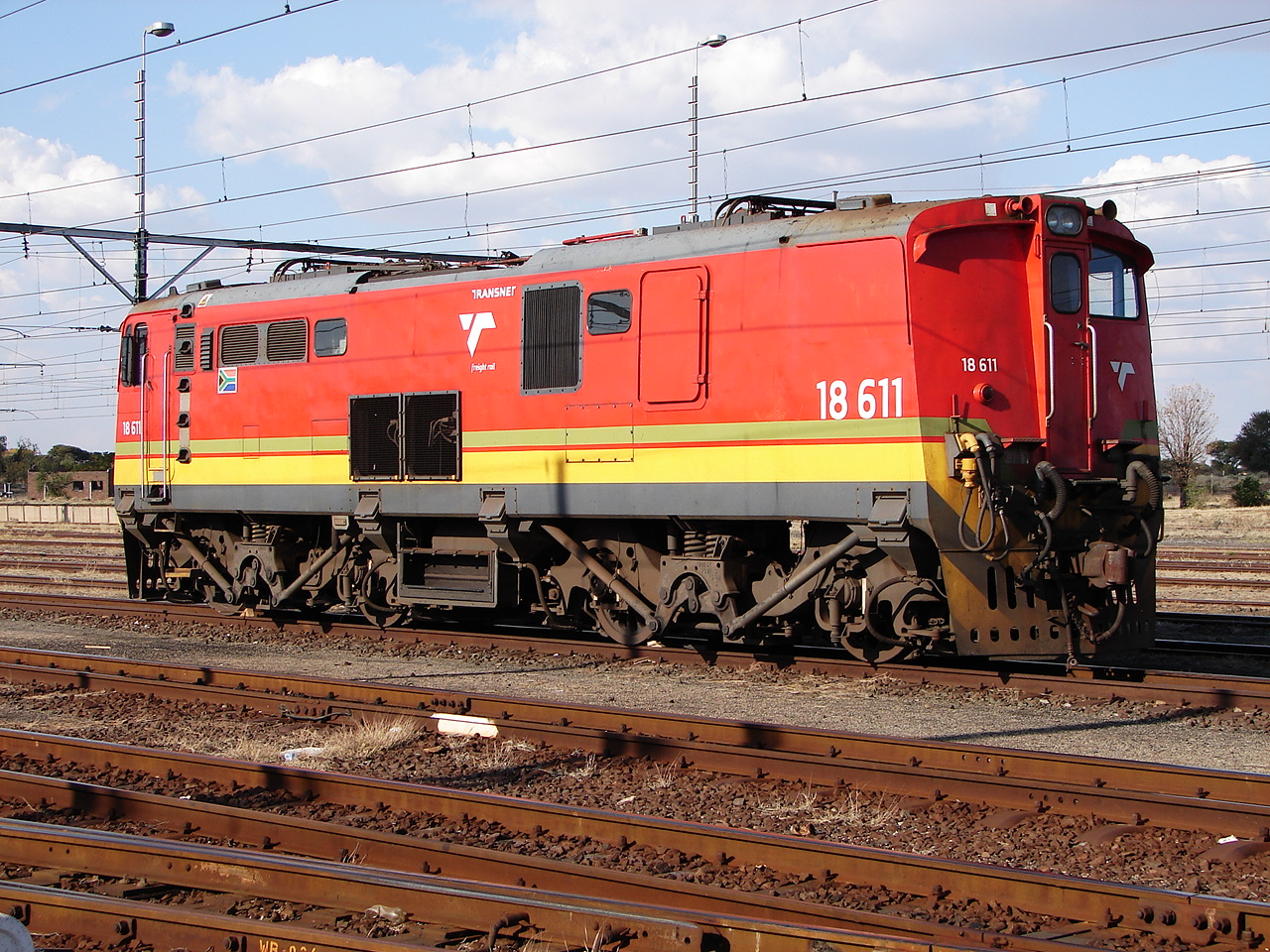
No. 18-611 (E1677) at Warrenton, Northern Cape, 21 May 2013

Rebuilt from Class 6E1, Series 7

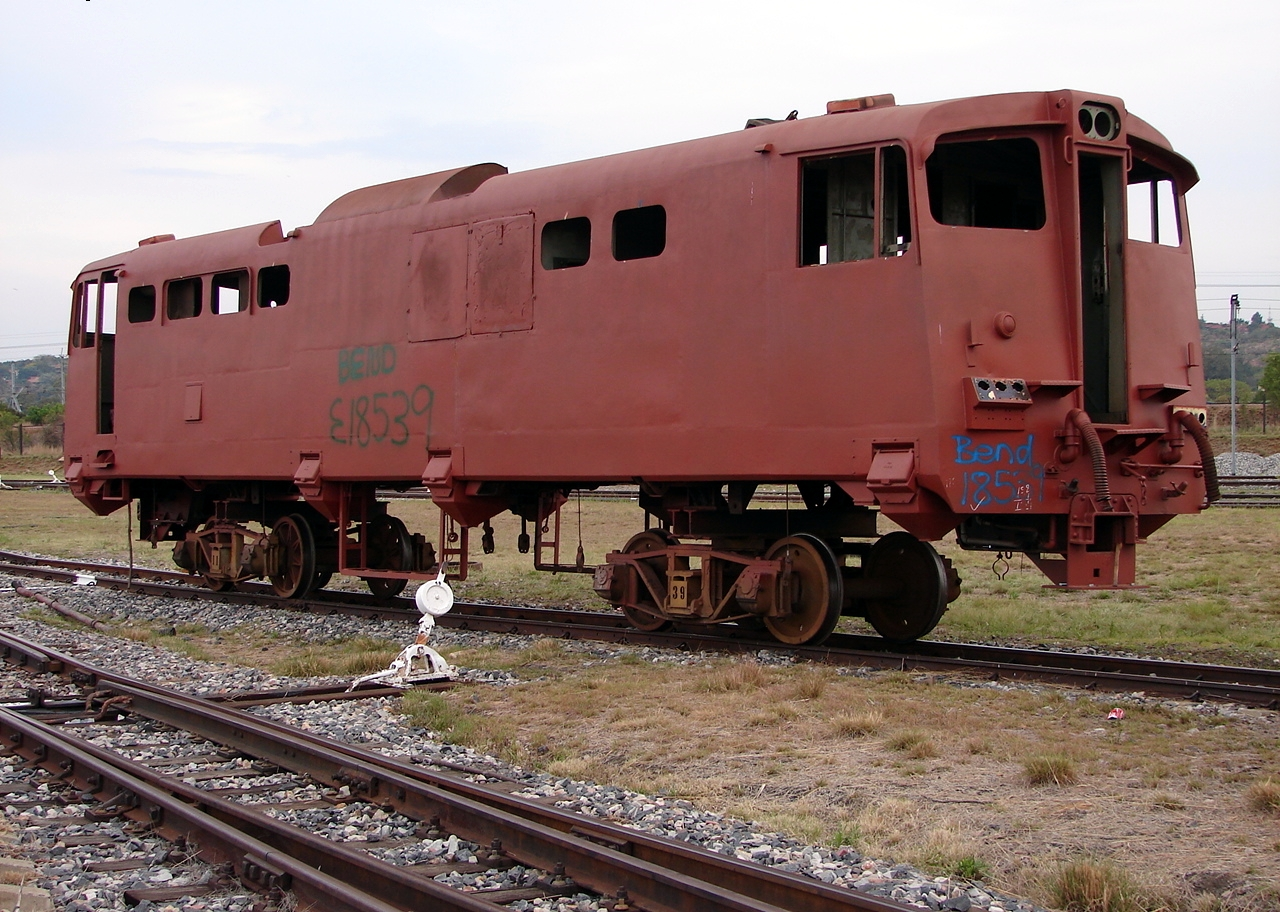
No. 18-613 (E1820) at Koedoespoort, Pretoria, 2 October 2009

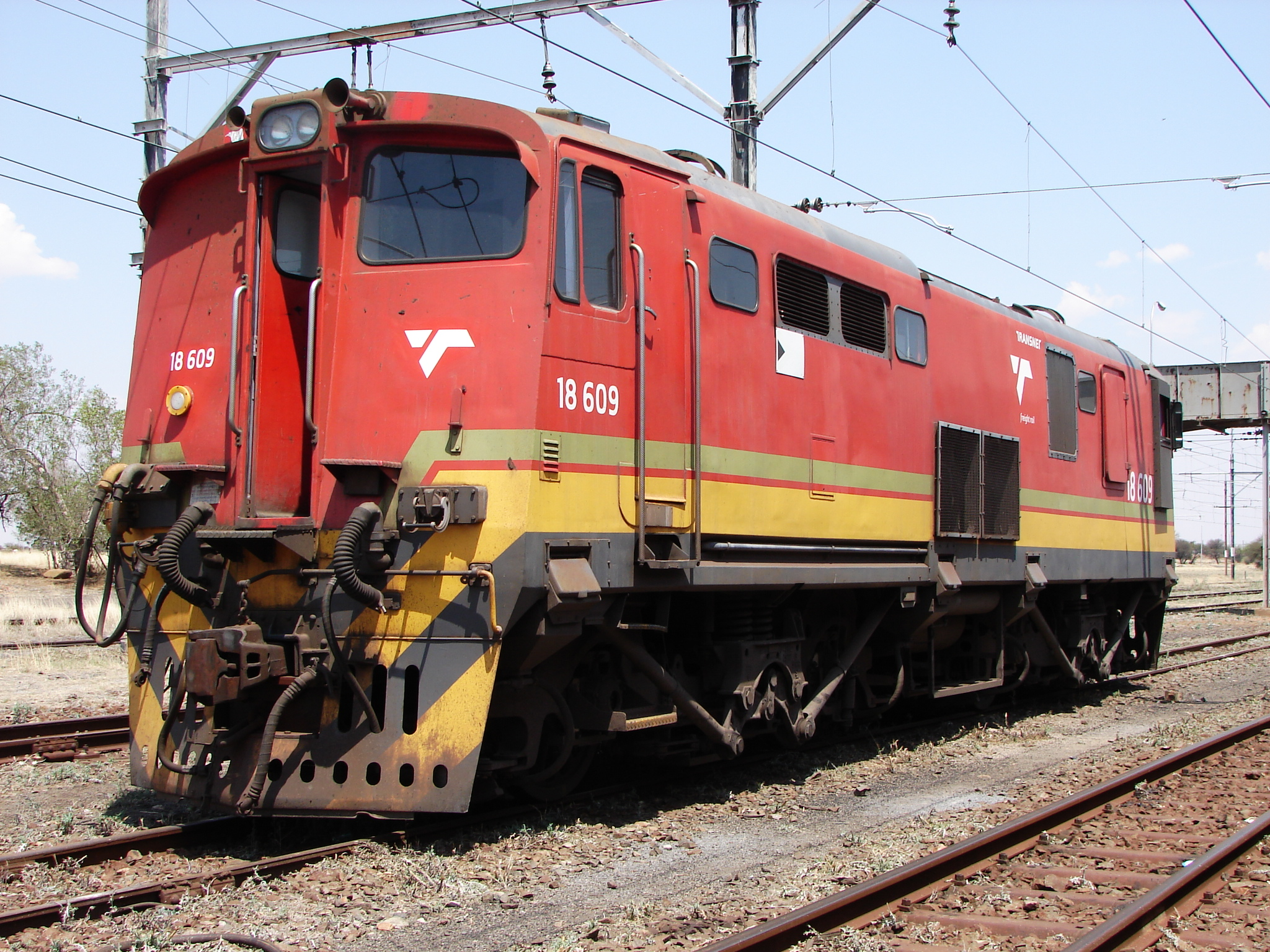
No. 18-609 (E1882) at Warrenton, Northern Cape, 8 October 2015

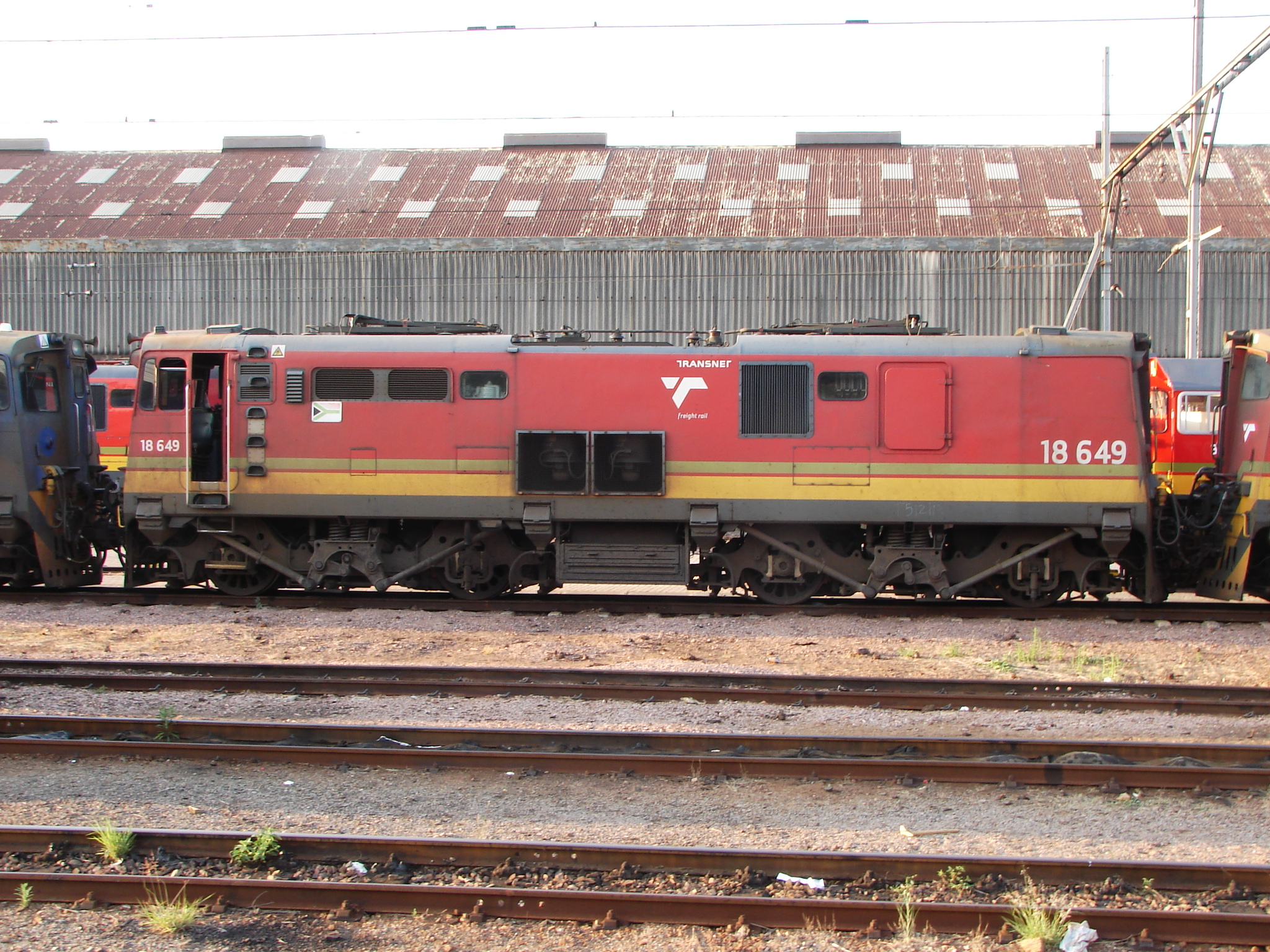
No. 18-649 (E1812) at Capital Park, Pretoria, 26 September 2015

Rebuilt from Class 6E1, Series 8

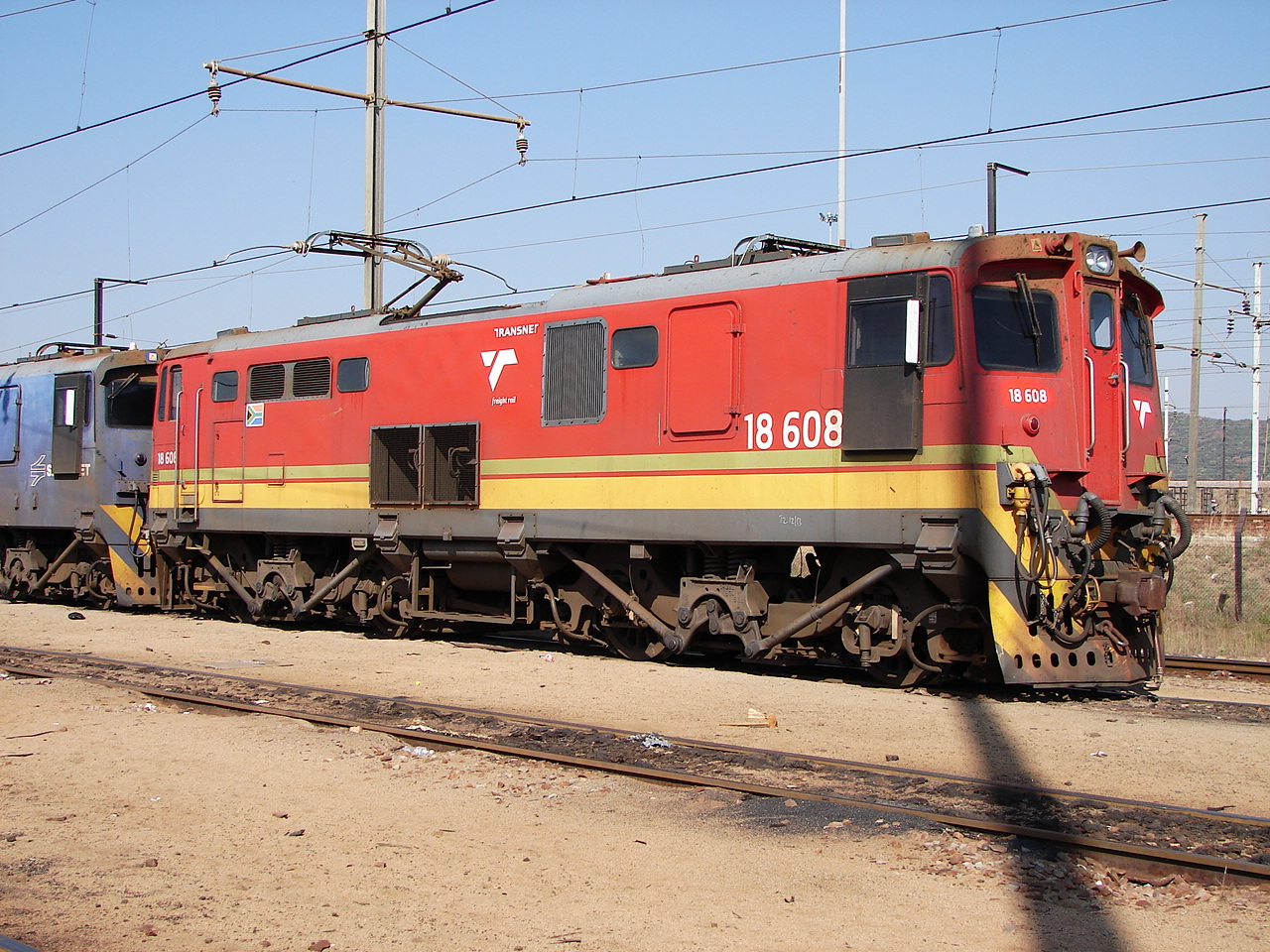
No. 18-608 (E1896) at Pyramid South, Gauteng, 14 May 2013
