= List of organisms named after works of fiction =

Newly created taxonomic names in biological nomenclature often reflect the discoverer's interests or honour those the discoverer holds in esteem, including fictional elements.

† Denotes that the organism is extinct.

== Literature ==
=== Greek mythology ===
Taxon	Type	Named for	Notes	Ref
Antigone antigone (Linnaeus, 1758)	Crane	Antigone	The species was named after "Antigone, daughter of King Laomedon of Troy, who was metamorphosed into a stork for presuming to compare herself to the goddess Hera. Linnaeus confused this myth with that of Gerana, princess of the pygmies, who was changed into a crane by Hera for committing the same lèse-majesté"	
Saguinus oedipus (Linnaeus, 1758)	New World monkey	Oedipus Rex	"Linnaeus had a penchant for giving primates names derived from mythology, sometimes with little obvious rationale. So he may have named this one after the mythical tragic King of Thebes, who unknowingly married his own mother."	
Astyanax Baird & Girard, 1854	American Tetra	Astyanax	The species was named after Astyanax (Ἀστυάναξ, "city protector"), a Trojan warrior in Greek mythology, son of Hector, Prince of Troy, allusion not explained, perhaps referring to large silvery scales of A. argentatus, which could be said to resemble armor	
Pseudoeurycea rex (Dunn, 1921)	Salamander	Oedipus Rex	Species formerly named Oedipus rex	
Oedipodrilus oedipus Holt, 1967	Segmented worm	Oedipus Rex		
Amblytylus peitho Linnavuori, 1997	Leaf bug	Peitho		
Atomophora astraia Linnavuori, 1997	Leaf bug	Dike/Astraea		
Andromakhe paris (Azpelicueta, Almirón & Casciotta, 2002)	American Tetra	Paris	named for Paris (Πάρις), uncle of Astyanax, both of whom fought in the Trojan war, named for its original placement in Astyanax	
Pseudotanais gaiae Jakiel, Palero & Błażewicz, 2019	Tanaid	Gaia	P. gaiae and P. uranos form a pair of sister species.	
Pseudotanais uranos Jakiel, Palero & Błażewicz, 2019	Tanaid	Uranus	P. gaiae and P. uranos form a pair of sister species.	
†Phyllodrepa daedali Shavrin & Yamamoto, 2019	Rove beetle	Daedalus	Fossil species found in Eocene Baltic amber.	
†Phyllodrepa icari Shavrin & Yamamoto, 2019	Rove beetle	Icarus	Fossil species found in Eocene Baltic amber.	
Andromakhe Terán, Benitez & Mirande, 2020	American Tetra	Andromache	named for Andromakhe (Áνδρομάχη, "battle of men"), wife of Hector, Prince of Troy, in Greek mythology, and, in Homer's epic poem Iliad, the mother of Astyanax (Ἀστυάναξ, "city protector"), named for its relationship to and the original placement of its species in Astyanax	
Hotwheels sisyphus Liu & Zhang, 2024	Spider	Sisyphus	"The specific name is derived from Sisyphus, a king in Greek mythology who offended Zeus and whose punishment was to repeatedly roll a huge stone up a hill only to have it roll back down, because the circular copulatory ducts are like Sisyphus's cyclic mission."	

=== Norse mythology ===
Taxon	Type	Named for	Notes	Ref
†Lokiceratops Loewen et al., 2024	Ceratopsian dinosaur	Loki	"The generic name refers to the god Loki from Norse mythology, and ceratops, (Greek) meaning "horned face". The species name refers to the bilateral asymmetry of frill ornamentations, similar to the asymmetry in antlers of the reindeer/caribou genus Rangifer."	
†Medusaceratops lokii Ryan, Russell & Hartman, 2010	Ceratopsian dinosaur	Loki	Loki has a "helmet with [...] two giant hooks that come out of the top"	
†Joermungandr bolti Mann et al., 2021	Recumbirostran	Jörmungandr	"'Joermungandr' the Swedish phoneme of 'Jörmungandr' (gender: masculine) the name of the serpent that dwells in the 'Midgard Sea' from Norse mythology. The specific epithet 'bolti' is in honour of the late palaeontologist John R. Bolt."	
†Jormungandr walhallaensis Zietlow, Boyd & van Vranken, 2023	Mosasaurid	Jörmungandr, Valhalla	The name is inspired by the discovery of the genus in the town of Walhalla, North Dakota.	
Voconia loki Castillo & Rédei & Weirauch, 2022	True bug	Loki	"Named after the cunning trickster from Norse mythology and from the Marvel Comics' character, Loki, since this specimen deceived and tricked authors in a previous study (Hwang & Weirauch 2012) who misidentified it as 'Kayanocoris wegneri'."	

=== Gargantua and Pantagruel (1532-1564) ===
Taxon	Type	Named for	Notes	Ref
Gigantactis gargantua Bertelsen, Pietsch & Lavenberg, 1981	Anglerfish	Gargantua		
†Gargantuavis Buffetaut & Le Loeuff, 1998	Bird	Gargantua	A genus of fossil flightless birds from the Cretaceous of Europe, and the largest known birds of the Mesozoic era; "generic name from Gargantua, the giant of French folklore made famous by François Rabelais, and avis, Latin for bird"	
†Notoetayoa gargantuai Gelfo, López & Bond, 2008	Xenungulate mammal	Gargantua	A fossil species of hoofed mammal from the Paleocene of Patagonia, Argentina, "Named after the literary character in François Rabelais' sixteenth century story of two eccentric giants, Gargantua and Pantagruel. In allusion to the larger size of this species compared to [its relative] Etayoa bacatensis."	
Epimeria gargantua d'Udekem d'Acoz & Verheye, 2017	Amphipod	Gargantua	"Gargantua is a giant and one of the main characters in the tales of François Rabelais, such as La vie très horrifique du grand Gargantua, père de Pantagruel. The name [...] alludes to the huge size of the species, which is the largest known Epimeria species."	

=== Journey to the West (c. 1592) ===
Taxon	Type	Named for	Notes	Ref
†Wukongopterus Wang et al., 2009	Pterosaur	Sun Wukong	A fossil from the Late Jurassic-Early Cretaceous of China, named "Wukongopterus, from Sun Wukong (the Monkey King), one of the most famous and beloved fictional characters of the classical Chinese literature "Journey to the West", and pterus from the Greek meaning wing."	
Ectatosticta wukong Lin & Li, 2020	Lampshade spider	Sun Wukong	Genus Ectatosticta is endemic to China. "The species is named after Wukong, a character in the classic Chinese novel Journey to the West, noun. Journey to the West was written during the Ming Dynasty (1368–1644 A.D) and is about the adventures of a priest, Xuanzang, and his three disciples, Wukong, Wuneng, and Wujing, as they travel west in search of the Buddhist Sutra. Their travel begins at what is today Xi'an (near the type locality of E. davidi), via Qinghai (close to the type locality of E. deltshevi), to South Xinjiang, Tibet (near the type locality of E. xuanzang sp. nov.) and India."	
Ectatosticta xuanzang Lin & Li, 2020	Lampshade spider	Tang Sanzang, a fictional version of the historical Xuanzang		
Ectatosticta bajie Lin & Li, 2021	Lampshade spider	Zhu Bajie		
Ectatosticta dapeng Lin & Li, 2021	Lampshade spider	Dapeng Jinchi Mingwang		
Ectatosticta rulai Lin & Li, 2021	Lampshade spider	Rulai, a fictional version of the Buddha		
†Syntelia sunwukong Jiang & Wang, 2021	Beetle	Sun Wukong	A fossil found in Cretaceous Burmese amber. "The species is named after "Sunwukong", the monkey king who was born from a magical rock, in the famous Chinese fiction Journey to the West. The discovery of the new species reminds the authors of the origin of Sunwukong."	
Salassa sunwukongi Zheng & Wang 2023	Moth	Sun Wukong	This species is native to China and "was named after the Monkey King in Chinese Mythology, for the diverse colours and monkey-face-like pattern in the hindwing"	
Brevistoma raksasiae Zheng, Ni & Liu, 2025	Spoonwing	Princess Iron Fan	"This new species is named after a fictional character "The Princess of Iron Fan (鐵扇公主)" (also known as "Râkṣasî") from the classic Chinese novel Journey to the West, in reference to the deeply association of the character with the Mt. Huoyanshan (meaning "Flaming Mountain"), a mountain connected to the Turpan Basin, near to the type locality of the new species. In the novel, Râkṣasî can use her magical "Iron Fan" to control the scorching and divine fire of the Flaming Mountains."	
Ambulyx wukong Jiang & Kitching, 2025	Moth	Sun Wukong		

=== William Shakespeare (1564–1616) ===
Taxon	Type	Named for	Notes	Ref
Oberonia Lindley (1859)	Fairy orchid	Oberon, A Midsummer Night's Dream		
Sycorax Haliday, 1839	Fly	Sycorax, The Tempest		
Peneothello Mathews, 1920	Australasian robin	Othello, Othello	Named for being almost (pene) black	
Pigrogromitus Calman, 1927	Sea spider	Pigrogromitus, Twelfth Night		
Malvoliophis Whitley, 1934	Snake eel	Malvolio, Twelfth Night	"From Malvolio, Lady Olivia's steward in Shakespeare's Twelfth Night, and ὄφις (ophis; masculine), serpent. The banded coloration of M. pinguis, the generic type, suggests the cross-gartered legs and yellow socks worn by Malvolio"	
Queubus Barnard, 1946	Sea spider	Queubus, Twelfth Night	"In sooth, we taxonomists are hard put to it to find names, but there have been far worse sources than the nonsense of Will Shakespeare."	
Cordelia Shirôzu & Yamamoto, 1956	Butterfly	Cordelia, King Lear		
Gonerilia Shirôzu & Yamamoto, 1956	Butterfly	Goneril, King Lear		
Iago Compagno & Springer, 1971	Houndshark	Iago, Othello	"This shark, a namesake of the villain of Shakespeare's Othello, is a troublemaker for systematists and hence a kind of villain."	
Geocharidius romeoi Erwin, 1982	Ground beetle	Romeo, Romeo and Juliet	"Romeoi, after Shakespeare's Romeo, who in Act 1 told Benvolio, "He that is stricken blind cannot forget the precious treasure of his eyesight lost," in reference to the demise of the Central American forests and its probable impact on these blind beetles, which are restricted to deep forest humus and litter."	
Agra othello Erwin, 2000	Ground beetle	Othello, Othello	The specific name "honors the complicated Shakespearian character whose stage image is a large male singer with a dark complexion. Agra othello is very large, black, and belongs to a formerly complicated species group"	
Euwalkeria perdita Albertson, 2005	Treehopper	Perdita, The Winter's Tale		
Perdita desdemona Portman, 2016	Bee	Desdemona, Othello	"The name comes from the character in Shakespeare's Othello."	
Perdita hippolyta Portman, 2016	Bee	Hippolyta, A Midsummer Night's Dream	"The name comes from the character in Shakespeare's A Midsummer Night's Dream."	
Perdita sycorax Portman, 2016	Bee	Sycorax, The Tempest	"The name comes from the unseen character in Shakespeare's The Tempest."	
Perdita titania Portman, 2016	Bee	Titania, A Midsummer Night's Dream	"The name comes from the fairy queen Titania in Shakespeare's play A Midsummer Night's Dream. The name was chosen due to the beauty and rarity of this species."	
†Alfaites romeo Valent, Fatka, & Marek 2019	Hyolith	Romeo, Romeo and Juliet	"The specific epithet 'romeo' refers to the Shakespeare's protagonist Romeo Montague."	
Pseudotanais julietae Jakiel, Palero & Błażewicz, 2019	Tanaid	Juliet, Romeo and Juliet	P. julietae and P. romeo form a pair of sister species.	
Pseudotanais romeo Jakiel, Palero & Błażewicz, 2019	Tanaid	Romeo, Romeo and Juliet	P. julietae and P. romeo form a pair of sister species.	
Synagelides rosalindae Kanesharatnam & Benjamin, 2020	Jumping spider	Rosalind, As You Like It	"The species is named after Rosalind Senior, the heroine of the play As You Like It by William Shakespeare. Generally noted for her resilience, quick wit, and beauty."	
Synagelides orlandoi Kanesharatnam & Benjamin, 2020	Jumping spider	Orlando, As You Like It	"The species is named after Orlando de Bois, who at first sight falls in love with Rosalind. He is brave, chivalrous, tender, modest, smart, strong, handsome and beloved by all. However, he is unable to express his love for Rosalind, before he leaves to the forest of Arden."	
†Xorides romeo Viertler & Klopfstein, 2024	Wasp	Romeo, Romeo and Juliet		

=== Don Quixote (1605-1615) ===
Taxon	Type	Named for	Notes	Ref
†Hipparion rocinantis Hernández-Pacheco, 1921	Horse	Rocinante	A fossil species of primitive horse from the Pliocene of La Mancha, Spain, named "in memory of the horse that was the product of the fantasy and genius of our immortal Cervantes. [...] the name I have chosen associates the equine idea with the geographical one [...]"	
Masdevallia don-quijote Luer & Andreetta	Orchid	Don Quixote	"Named for the fancied appearance of the flower with its forward-pointing dorsal sepal resembling a lance and the lateral sepals resembling the bowed legs of a horseman."	
†Dulcineaia manchegana Babin & Gutiérrez-Marco, 1991	Bivalve	Dulcinea del Toboso	A fossil species of saltwater clam from the Ordovician of La Mancha, Spain.	
Oncidium dulcineae (Pupulin & G.A.Rojas) M.W.Chase & N.H.Williams	Orchid	Dulcinea del Toboso	Originally described as Sigmatostalix dulcineae and subsequently transferred to genus Oncidium	
Ardistomis quixotei Pavel Valdés, 2007	Ground beetle	Don Quixote	"a patronymic, based on the Latinized surname of the fictional Don Quijote, immortalized in the famous novel Don Quijote de la Mancha written by Miguel de Cervantes Saavedra and first published in 1605. This species is named to commemorate the 400th anniversary of publication of this important piece of Spanish literature."	
†Lohuecotitan pandafilandi Díez Díaz et al., 2016	Titanosaur	Pandafilando of the Scowl	"The specific name pandafilandi refers to Pandafilando de la fosca vista, one of the characters in the novel The Ingenious Gentleman Don Quixote of La Mancha (El ingenioso hidalgo don Quijote de la Mancha) written by Miguel de Cervantes and published in the early seventeenth century. Pandafilando is, in the mind of the protagonist, a giant against whom he must fight." The character is named "Pandafilando of the Scowl" in John Ormsby's translation.	
Carex quixotiana Ben.Benítez, Martín-Bravo, Luceño & Jim.Mejías (2023)	Sedge	Don Quixote	"The species epithet, quixotiana (pronounced kee·how·tee·a·na in English) is derived from Miguel de Cervantes's (1547–1616) masterpiece Don Quixote [...], globally considered one of the best works in the history of literature, and whose number of editions and translations is only surpassed by the Bible. The setting of Don Quixote is La Mancha, the region of Spain where almost all populations of Carex quixotiana occur."	

=== Robinson Crusoe (1719) ===
Taxon	Type	Named for	Notes	Ref
Robinsonia DC. (1833)	Flowering plant	Robinson Crusoe	This genus is endemic to the Juan Fernández Islands, where Alexander Selkirk was shipwrecked; he was the inspiration for Robinson Crusoe.	
Axinopalpus crusoei (Reed, 1874)	Beetle	Robinson Crusoe	This species is endemic to Juan Fernández Islands. It was originally described as Variopalpus crusoei, but genus Variopalpus was subsequently syonymised with Axinopalpus.	
Hemistomia fridayi Haase & Bouchet, 1998	Freshwater snail	Friday, Robinson Crusoe	This species was found in the district of Robinson, New Caledonia.	
Oncopagurus crusoei Lemaitre, 2014	Hermit crab	Robinson Crusoe	This species is endemic to the Juan Fernández Islands, where Alexander Selkirk was shipwrecked; he was the inspiration for Robinson Crusoe.	

=== Gulliver's Travels (1726) ===
Taxon	Type	Named for	Notes	Ref
Salticus lilliputanus Lucas, 1846	Spider	Lilliput		
Holorusia brobdingnagia (Westwood, 1876)	Crane fly	Brobdingnag	Originally described as Tipula brobdingnagia and subsequently transferred to genus Holorusia.	
Notobrachypterus lilliputanus Blackburn, 1892	Beetle	Lilliput	"Its extremely small size will distinguish this species from its allies"	
Echinochasmus liliputanus (Looss, 1896)	Fluke	Lilliput	"The species is extremely small and probably represents the pygmy of the genus". Originally described as Echinostomum liliputanum and subsequently transferred to genus Echinochasmus.	
Otiorhynchus liliputanus Apfelbeck, 1908	Beetle	Lilliput	"distinguished by a smaller body"	
Scabrina liliputiana (Preston, 1909)	Snail	Lilliput	"Distinguished [...] by its extremely small size, vivid and well-marked painting and generally compact appearance." Originally described as Cyclophorus (Theobaldia) liliputiana and subsequently transferred to genus Scabrina.	
Laputa Whitley, 1930	Filefish	Laputa		
Paracardiophorus liliputanus Fleutiaux, 1935	Beetle	Lilliput	"a curious little species"	
Blossfeldia liliputana Werderm. (1937)	Cactus	Lilliput	Smallest cactus known to science.	
†Balnibarbi Fortey, 1974	Trilobite	Balnibarbi		
Dryadella lilliputiana Cogniaux (1978)	Orchid	Lilliput	"Many of the species names reflect their diminutive stature [...] D. lilliputiana to Gulliver's tiny captors"	
†Blefuscuiana Banner & Desai, 1988	Foraminifer	Blefuscu	A fossil genus from the Cretaceous of England; "Blefuscuiana is named in distinction from Lilliputianella n. gen. and derives its name from the miniature ovoids of Blefuscu (Swift, 1726) which were displayed at their bluntly rounded ends." Some sources synonymize this genus with Hedbergella.	
†Lilliputianella Banner & Desai, 1988	Foraminifer	Lilliput	A fossil genus from the Cretaceous of England; "The generic name Lilliputianella is derived from Lilliput (Swift, 1726) wherein organisms were of small proportions and where ovoids which displayed their pointed ends were preferred."	
†Laputavis Dyke, 2001	Swift	Laputa		
Chorebus liliputanus Fischer, Tormos, Docavo & Pardo, 2004	Wasp	Lilliput	"The name refers to the very small size of the species."	
Viola lilliputana Ballard & Iltis (2012)	Flowering plant	Lilliput	"The specific epithet makes a fanciful reference to the tiny growth form of the new species as 'lilliputian'"	
Peruphorticus gulliveri Erwin & Zamorano, 2014	Beetle	Lemuel Gulliver	"We so name this species because of its very large size in comparison to its congeners, reminding us of Gulliver's travels on the island of Lilliput."	
Meoneura lilliputensis Stuke & Freidberg, 2017	Fly	Lilliput	A tiny fly (length<2 mm) "named after the fictional island Lilliput that was introduced in the novel Gulliver's Travels by Jonathan Swift (1726). Lilliput is inhabited by tiny people, who are about one-twelfth the height of ordinary human beings."	
Anthobium liliputense Shavrin & Smetana, 2018	Beetle	Lilliput	"The specific epithet is derived from Lilliput, the fictional island with small people that appear in the novel Gulliver's Travels by the famous English writer Jonathan Swift. It refers to the very small size of the species."	
Pluteus liliputianus E.F. Malysheva & Malysheva (2019)	Fungus	Lilliput	"The epithet reflects very small, diminutive size of basidiocarps"	
Hypothenemus liliputianus Bright, 2019	Beetle	Lilliput	"Latinized form of liliputian, referring to the very small size of the female."	
Eragrostis lilliputiana R.L.Barrett & P.M.Peterson	Grass	Lilliput	A replacement name for Heterachne gulliveri Benth., an Australian species, when it was reclassified in genus Eragrostis. "The epithet 'gulliveri' is unavailable in Eragrostis, being preoccupied by Eragrostis gulliveri (F.Muell.) R.L.Barrett & P.M.Peterson. Originally named after collector Thomas A. Gulliver [...], the replacement epithet is based on the adventures of Lemuel Gulliver on the island of Lilliput (Swift 1726), located 'north-west of Van Diemen's Land' and, hence, logically part of what is now Australia. A tale of adventure in unknown lands, Swift's book captures the adventure and trepidation that Thomas Gulliver might have experienced while exploring northern Queensland in the 1870s with the Telegraph Department."	
†Rhyssa gulliveri Viertler, Klopfstein & Spasojevic, 2023	Wasp	Lemuel Gulliver	A fossil species found in Baltic amber, "Named after Lemuel Gulliver from Gulliver's Travels, who was trapped despite his body size."	
Matelea lilliputiana Díaz-Mota, L.O. Alvarado & Pio-León	Milkvine	Lilliput	"The specific epithet refers to the small flowers of this plant and is associated with the tiny characters of Lilliput, from the novel Gulliver's Travels by the writer Jonathan Swift. This plant has the smallest flowers within the Matelea genus in Mexico."	
Octomeria lilliputana W.Forst., F.Barros & V.C.Souza	Orchid	Lilliput	"The epithet is a reference to Lilliput, an imaginary island of Jonathan Swift’s famous novel “Gulliver’s Travels”, whose inhabitants were very small."	

=== Jane Austen (1775–1817) ===
Taxon	Type	Named for	Notes	Ref
Aphelochaeta annae Grosse, Nygren & Capa, 2026	Polychaete worm	Anne Elliot, Persuasion		
Aphelochaeta elinorae Grosse, Nygren & Capa, 2026	Polychaete worm	Elinor Dashwood, Sense and Sensibility		
Tharyx emmae Grosse, Nygren & Capa, 2026	Polychaete worm	Emma Woodhouse, Emma		

=== Percy Bysshe Shelley (1792–1822) ===
Taxon	Type	Named for	Notes	Ref
†Ozymandias (Jordan, 1907)	Ray-finned fish	"Ozymandias"	A fossil from the Miocene of California, USA. It was a large specimen described from very scant remains, hence "The generic name refers to the heroic giant noticed by Shelley, of whom nothing is known save the feet of his gigantic statue in the desert." Jordan initially thought it could be a relative of the louvar, but later reclassified it into the family Scombridae which includes tuna and mackerel.	
†Ophiodon ozymandias Jordan, 1921	Greenling	"Ozymandias"	A fossil from the Miocene of California, USA. The specimen was originally attributed to genus Ozymandias, but subsequently reclassified as a species of lingcod, and the word "Ozymandias" was repurposed as the specific name.	
†Ozymandipteryx Schall, Cao & Husemann M, 2025	Pygmy mole cricket	"Ozymandias"	A fossil mud cricket found in Cretaceous Burmese amber, "Named after Ozymandias, a poem by Percy Bysshe Shelley (1818) about the loss of greatness and forgetting of glory by the passing of time. It refers to the state of absent/very reduced metatarsi in the genus"	

=== Victor Hugo (1802–1885) ===
Taxon	Type	Named for	Notes	Ref
Brachypremna quasimodo Alexander, 1943	Crane fly	Quasimodo, The Hunchback of Notre-Dame	"The strongly hunchbacked condition of the fly is not even approached in the approximately 15 other regional species so far made known."	
Quasimodia J.L. Barnard, 1969	Amphipod	Quasimodo, The Hunchback of Notre-Dame	"J.L. Barnard [...] mentioned that this genus-group name was from Quasimodo — a fictional hunchbacked character in Victor Hugo's novel, and referred to the dorsal hump on pereonite 1 of the originally included three species."	
Paracalanus quasimodo Bowman, 1971	Copepod	Quasimodo, The Hunchback of Notre-Dame	"The name is derived from the protagonist of Victor Hugo's classic novel, The Hunchback of Notre-Dame, and alludes to the distinctive shape of the prosome."	
Stylaclista quasimodo Early, 1980	Wasp	Quasimodo, The Hunchback of Notre-Dame	"Stylaclista quasimodo can be recognised by its strongly humped scutellum (hence the name), setation of the head and mesosoma, and the scarcity of setae between the epomia."	
Orchestiella quasimodo Friend, 1987	Amphipod	Quasimodo, The Hunchback of Notre-Dame	"The specific name is taken from the deformed bell-ringer in Victor Hugo's novel 'Notre Dame de Paris', in reference to the hunched appearance of this amphipod."	
Steindachnerina quasimodoi Vari & Williams Vari, 1989	Fish	Quasimodo, The Hunchback of Notre-Dame	"The specific name quasimodoi is taken from Quasimodo, the misunderstood hunchback bell-ringer of the Cathedral in Victor Hugo's novel Notre Dame de Paris, and refers to the pronounced humped dorsal profile of the body in larger specimens of the species."	
Bulbophyllum quasimodo J.J.Verm.	Orchid	Quasimodo, The Hunchback of Notre-Dame	"The name alludes to Quasimodo, Victor Hugo's ugly humpbacked leprechaun."	
Tetragnatha quasimodo Gillespie, 1992	Spider	Quasimodo, The Hunchback of Notre-Dame	"The common name of this species is "Humpback Spiny", because of the prominent mid-dorsal peak of the abdomen. The specific epithet, regarded as a noun in apposition, refers to Victor Hugo's Hunchback of Notre-Dame."	
Nomoclastes quasimodo Pinto da Rocha, 1997	Harvestman	Quasimodo, The Hunchback of Notre-Dame	"in reference to the Victor Hugo's monster, "Quasimodo", humpbacked as this Stygnidae."	
Agra eponine Erwin, 2000	Beetle	Éponine, Les Misérables	"The specific epithet, eponine, is the name of the unfortunate street urchin in Victor Hugo's Les Miserables, who, in the Broadway version of the story, personified tragic beauty. Such is the state of the tropical forests where these beetles live"	
Schistura quasimodo Kottelat, 2000	Fish	Quasimodo, The Hunchback of Notre-Dame	The body of this species "sometimes [shows] a conspicuous hump".	
Paradynomene quasimodo McLay & Ng, 2004	Crab	Quasimodo, The Hunchback of Notre-Dame	"The name is derived from Victor Hugo's character, Quasimodo, the Hunchback of Notre-Dame; alluding to its tumescent, hunchback carapace shape."	
Pseudione quasimodo Boyko & Williams, 2004	Isopod	Quasimodo, The Hunchback of Notre-Dame	"The specific name quasimodo is derived from Victor Hugoʼs famous bell-ringer of Notre-Dame, most famously portrayed in film by the great Lon Chaney (1883–1930). This appellation is appropriate due to the shape of the female isopod and the bulge it creates in the branchial chamber of the host"	
Neopantopsalis quasimodo Taylor & Hunt, 2009	Harvestman	Quasimodo, The Hunchback of Notre-Dame		
Harpirhynchus quasimodo Bochkov & Mertins, 2010	Mite	Quasimodo, The Hunchback of Notre-Dame	"Anterior part of propodonotal shield bearing hump-like projection..."	
Quasimodorogas Quicke & Butcher, 2011	Wasp	Quasimodo, The Hunchback of Notre-Dame		
Apseudes quasimodo Błażewicz-Paszkowycz & Bamber, 2012	Tanaid	Quasimodo, The Hunchback of Notre-Dame	"Named after Quasimodo, a central character from French author Victor Hugo's 1831 novel Notre-Dame de Paris, who also had a distinctive dorsal hump."	
Menneus quasimodo Coddington, Kuntner & Opell, 2012	Spider	Quasimodo, The Hunchback of Notre-Dame	"The holotype spider resembles Quasimodo in having a "wart" and a "hump""	
Rissoina quasimodo Faber, 2013	Sea snail	Quasimodo, The Hunchback of Notre-Dame	"Quasimodo [...], being the name of Victor Hugo's hunchback of the Notre Dame, for its high, rounded shoulder, especially when seen from the side."	
Selenoribates quasimodo Pfingstl, 2013	Mite	Quasimodo, The Hunchback of Notre-Dame	"This appellation is due to the hunchback of this species shown in lateral view (that does not necessarily mean the species is as ugly as the bell-ringer was supposed to be)."	
Chaleponcus quasimodo Enghoff, 2014	Millipede	Quasimodo, The Hunchback of Notre-Dame		
Ephemeroporus quasimodo Elmoor-Loureiro, 2014	Water flea	Quasimodo, The Hunchback of Notre-Dame	"clearly differs from all other species of the genus in the high dorsal keel (hunchback)".	
Temnothorax quasimodo Snelling, Borowiec & Prebus, 2014	Ant	Quasimodo, The Hunchback of Notre-Dame	"named for the Victor Hugo character in his novel The Hunchback of Notre-Dame. [...] The short, deep mesosoma with distinctly convex dorsum results in a "hunched" profile that is characteristic for this species".	
†Quasimolites quasimodo Valent et al., 2015	Hyolith	Quasimodo, The Hunchback of Notre-Dame	A fossil from the Cambrian of the Czech Republic, whose genus and species name are "Derived from the name of hunchback Quasimodo for the distinct keel on the dorsum."	
Varanusia quasimodo (Nogueira, Hutchings & Carrerette, 2015)	Polychaete worm	Quasimodo, The Hunchback of Notre-Dame	Named "in reference to the pronounced hump this species has on anterior segments." Originally described as Lizardia quasimodo, the genus was subsequently renamed due to its homonymy with a different genus of worms, both named after their type location (Lizard Island, Australia).	
Squalus quasimodo Viana, Carvalho & Gomes, 2016	Dogfish shark	Quasimodo, The Hunchback of Notre-Dame	"Named for the hunchback of Notre-Dame from the 19th Century novel by Victor Hugo, in obvious reference to its most noticeable character" — "body conspicuously robust and humped dorsally".	
Epimeria quasimodo d'Udekem d'Acoz & Verheye, 2017	Amphipod	Quasimodo, The Hunchback of Notre-Dame	"Quasimodo, the hunchback of Notre-Dame, is a well-known character from the novel Notre-Dame de Paris by Victor Hugo. The name [...] alludes to the humpbacked silhouette of the species."	
Ocrepeira quasimodo (Ferreira-Sousa & Motta, 2022)	Spider	Quasimodo, The Hunchback of Notre-Dame	Originally described as Carepalxis quasimodo and subsequently transferred to genus Ocrepeira.	
Haplochromis quasimodo Vranken et al., 2022	Fish	Quasimodo, The Hunchback of Notre-Dame	"Specific name from Quasimodo, hunchbacked character in Victor Hugo's novel Notre-Dame de Paris (1831); referring to rather shallow head and deep and rhomboid bodies of large specimens."	
Mecolaesthus quasimodo Huber, 2023	Spider	Quasimodo, The Hunchback of Notre-Dame	This species features a "strongly inflated" carapace and "is named after Victor Hugo's fictional character and main protagonist of the novel Notre-Dame de Paris, Quasimodo, who had a severe hunchback"	
Parastacus quasimodo Ribeiro & Araujo, 2024	Crawfish	Quasimodo, The Hunchback of Notre-Dame	"Pleon S3 longer than S2 with an elevation resembling a humpback."	
Adelopoma quasimodo Gargominy, 2025	Snail	Quasimodo, The Hunchback of Notre-Dame	"The species is named after Quasimodo, the hunchback character of Victor Hugo's novel Notre-Dame de Paris, and refers to the bulge on the body whorl. It also reminds one of the catastrophic event of the fire at Notre-Dame de Paris cathedral on 15 April 2019, which occurred during the Trinité collecting trip."	
†Sabatia quasimodoi Harzhauser, Landau & Malaquias, 2026	Sea snail	Quasimodo, The Hunchback of Notre-Dame	"After the protagonist of the French novel The Hunchback of Notre-Dame (1831) by Victor Hugo, referring to the hunched back-like parietal callus."	

=== The Three Musketeers (1844) ===
Taxon	Type	Named for	Notes	Ref
Leptacis aramis Masner, 1960	Wasp	Aramis		
Leptacis athos Masner, 1960	Wasp	Athos		
Leptacis porthos Masner, 1960	Wasp	Porthos		
†Orodus aramisi Lelièvre & Derycke, 1998	Shark	Aramis	Described from a single fossil tooth from the Devonian of China, and named "After the moustach [sic] of one of the three French musketeers, whose name is Aramis"	
Schistura aramis Kottelat, 2000	Stone loach	Aramis		
Schistura athos Kottelat, 2000	Stone loach	Athos		
Schistura porthos Kottelat, 2000	Stone loach	Porthos		
Agrilus aramis Jendek & Grebennikov 2018	Beetle	Aramis		
Agrilus athos Jendek & Grebennikov 2018	Beetle	Athos		
Agrilus porthos Jendek & Grebennikov 2018	Beetle	Porthos		
Rhabdias aramis Kuzmin, du Preez, Nel & Svitin, 2022	Roundworm	Aramis		
Rhabdias athos Kuzmin, du Preez, Nel & Svitin, 2022	Roundworm	Athos		
Rhabdias porthos Kuzmin, du Preez, Nel & Svitin, 2022	Roundworm	Porthos		
Spongiopsyllus aramisi Farias, Santana, Neves & Jonsson, 2024	Copepod	Aramis	The tapered morphology of leg 1 endopodal segments of these 3 species, showing sharpened processes, inspired naming them after the swordsmen from The Three Musketeers.	
Spongiopsyllus athosi Farias, Santana, Neves & Jonsson, 2024	Copepod	Athos	The tapered morphology of leg 1 endopodal segments of these 3 species, showing sharpened processes, inspired naming them after the swordsmen from The Three Musketeers.	
Spongiopsyllus porthosi Farias, Santana, Neves & Jonsson, 2024	Copepod	Porthos	The tapered morphology of leg 1 endopodal segments of these 3 species, showing sharpened processes, inspired naming them after the swordsmen from The Three Musketeers.	

=== Fyodor Dostoevsky (1821–1881) ===
Taxon	Type	Named for	Notes	Ref
Tobantilla aleatrix Williams, Brothers & Pitts, 2011	Velvet ant	The Gambler	"From the Latin, the female of aleator, "gambler"; noun in apposition. This species [...] is named after a work by Russian author Fyodor Mikhailovich Dostoevsky, in this case the novel Игрок "The Gambler", with an allusion to initial uncertainty about its specific status."	
Tobantilla kolasma Williams, Brothers & Pitts, 2011	Velvet ant	Crime and Punishment	"From the Greek kolasma "punishment", a noun in apposition. This species, along with T. krima is named after the Russian novel Преступление и наказание "Crime and Punishment" written by Fyodor Mikhailovich Dostoevsky."	
Tobantilla krima Williams, Brothers & Pitts, 2011	Velvet ant	Crime and Punishment	"From the Greek krima "crime", a noun in apposition. This species, along with T. kolasma is named after the Russian novel Преступление и наказание "Crime and Punishment" written by Fyodor Mikhailovich Dostoevsky."	

=== Moby-Dick (1851) ===
Taxon	Type	Named for	Notes	Ref
Daggoo Sime & Wahl, 2002	Wasp	Daggoo	"The genus is named after one of the harpooners in Melville's novel Moby-Dick."	
Queequeg Sime & Wahl, 2002	Wasp	Queequeg	"The genus is named after one of the harpooners in Melville's novel Moby-Dick."	
Tashtego Sime & Wahl, 2002	Wasp	Tashtego	"The genus is named after one of the harpooners in Melville's novel Moby-Dick."	
†Thaleops mobydicki Amati & Westrop, 2004	Trilobite	Moby Dick	"At times, the senior author's analysis of relationships among illaenid trilobites felt like Ahab's pursuit of the Great White Whale."	
Voeltzkowia mobydick (Miralles et al, 2012)	Skink	Moby Dick	"The specific epithet refers to Moby Dick, the famous albino sperm whale imagined by Herman Melville (1851), with whom the new species shares several uncommon characteristics, such as the lack of hindlimbs, the presence of flipper-like forelimbs, highly reduced eyes, and the complete absence of pigmentation" Originally described as Sirenoscincus mobydick and subsequently transferred to genus Voeltzkowia.	
†Albicetus Boersma & Pyenson, 2015	Toothed whale	Moby Dick	"Combining the Latin words albus (white) and cetus (whale). The name pays tribute to H. Melville's classic American novel Moby-Dick; or, The Whale. In the novel, Melville refers to Moby Dick as "the White Whale", a creature of "unwonted magnitude" with a "remarkable hue" and "deformed lower jaw". These traits are coincidentally similar to the type specimen of Albicetus, a white fossil sperm whale whose jaws have been displaced due to diagenetic processes."	
Vrijenhoekia ahabi Summers, Pleijel & Rouse, 2015	Segmented worm	Captain Ahab	"Ahabi is in reference to Herman Melville's Captain Ahab, as both he and this species of worm will go to the ends of the earth to find a whale. This name was a winner of a 'Name a Species' public contest organised by Birch Aquarium, the Scripps Institution of Oceanography, submitted by Andy Fyfe."	
Cryptotermes mobydicki Scheffrahn, 2025	Termite	Moby Dick	"The lateral view of the soldier frontal process and elongate head [...] resembles the head of a sperm whale. Both organisms have mandibles eclipsed by the head, and the whale eye and soldier's antennal socket are comparatively positioned."	

=== Lewis Carroll (1832–1898) ===
Taxon	Type	Named for	Notes	Ref
†Borogovia Osmólska, 1987<	Theropod dinosaur	Borogove, "Jabberwocky"	Named after the "borogove — the name of a fantastic creature from "Alice in Wonderland" by Lewis Carroll"	
†Hemignathus vorpalis James & Olsen, 2003	Finch	Vorpal blade, "Jabberwocky"	Named "in reference to the long scimitar-like maxillary rostrum of the bird"	

=== Jules Verne (1828–1905) ===
Taxon	Type	Named for	Notes	Ref
"Candidatus Desulforudis audaxviator" Chivian et al., 2008	Bacteria	"Audax viator", Journey to the Center of the Earth	"[I]n Jules Verne's Journey to the Center of the Earth, in a message [...] deciphered by Verne's protagonist, Professor Lidenbrock, which reads in part, 'descende, Audax viator, et terrestre centrum attinges.' It means 'descend, Bold traveler, and attain the center of the Earth.'"	
Georissus nemo Fikáček, Delgado & Gentili, 2012	Beetle	Captain Nemo	"The species name refers to Captain Nemo, a fictional character of two novels by Jules Verne, who lived underseas (in a submarine Nautilus), hence in an environment unusual for a human. This resembles specimens of Georissus nemo sp. nov. collected in 2010 which were found underwater, in an environment unusual for this genus."	
Testacella lidenbrocki Quintana, 2022	Slug	Otto Lidenbrock, Journey to the Center of the Earth	"Due to its hypogeous habits, the species is dedicated to Professor Otto Lidenbrock, a fictional character created by Jules Verne in his work Journey to the Centre of the Earth."	
Munidopsis nemo Rodríguez-Flores, 2025	Squat lobster	Captain Nemo	"The new species is named after the charismatic character in Jules Verne's novel, Captain Nemo. This character inspired me like many other children to pursue a career in marine biology."	

=== Mark Twain (1835–1910) ===
Taxon	Type	Named for	Notes	Ref
Phanuromyia pauper Nesheim and Masner, 2017	Wasp	The Prince and the Pauper	"The name pauper refers to the lack of longitudinal costae on the base of T2."	
Phanuromyia princeps Nesheim and Masner, 2017	Wasp	The Prince and the Pauper	"The name princeps is derived from the prince character in the book The Prince and the Pauper by Mark Twain in reference to its similarity to P. pauper."	

=== The Adventures of Pinocchio (1883) ===
Taxon	Type	Named for	Notes	Ref
Walckenaeria pinocchio (Kaston, 1945)	Spider	Pinocchio	"From all other known species this one can be distinguished by its very long cephalic horn." Originally described as Cornicularia pinocchio; subsequently, genus Cornicularia was synonymised with Walckenaeria.	
Masdevallia pinocchio Luer & Andreeta, 1978	Orchid	Pinocchio	"Named for Pinocchio, the long-nosed, wooden puppet that wanted to be a little boy", because of the appearance of the flowers.	
Oxypleurodon pinocchio (Guinot & Richer de Forges, 1985)	Crab	Pinocchio	"the long and "turned-up" rostrum of this species recall [sic] to mind the long and snub nose of the mischievious [sic] Pinocchio."; Originally described as Sphenocarcinus pinocchio, and subsequently transferred to genus Oxypleurodon.	
†Pinocchiodinium Torricelli, 2000	Dinocyst	Pinocchio	A fossil from the Cretaceous of Italy; "the single lateral horn (or process) resembles Pinoccio's famous nose."	
Platymamersopsis pinocchio Goldschmidt, 2008	Water mite	Pinocchio	This species has a "keel-like extended rostrum" and is named "referring to the Italian fairytale figure, famous for its long nose."	
Uroptychus pinocchio Poore & Andreakis, 2011	Squat lobster	Pinocchio	"For Pinocchio, a wooden puppet that dreamt of becoming a real boy in the 1883 novel Le avventure di Pinocchio by Carlo Collodi. Pinocchio's nose grew longer when he told lies." This species belongs to the Uroptychus naso complex, distinctive for their particularly long and broad rostrum.	
Eviota pinocchioi Greenfield & Winterbottom, 2012	Dwarfgoby	Pinocchio	"Named after Carlo Collodi's fictional character Pinocchio, who had a nose that grew long when he lied, alluding to the exceptionally long anterior tubular nares in this species."	
Anchylorhynchus pinocchio De Madeiros & Nunez-Avellaneda, 2013	Weevil	Pinocchio	"Named after the popular fictional character Pinocchio, because of the extremely elongate rostrum as compared to other species of the genus."	
Monodelphis pinocchio Pavan, 2015	Short-tailed opossum	Pinocchio	"The specific epithet is a noun in apposition and refers to the fictional wooden doll [...], in allusion to the elongated rostrum shared by this species and its namesake."	
Pinocchia Dvořák et al, 2015	Cyanobacterium	Pinocchio	"Generic epithet refers to the elongated cells, especially to terminal cells. Pinocchio is a popular character from an Italian fairy tale (by Carlo Collodi), who had longer nose [sic] when telling lies"	
Litoria pinocchio Oliver et al, 2019	Frog	Pinocchio	Males have a "distinct rostral spike" and is named in "reference to Carlo Collodi's fictional character Pinocchio, who had a nose that became longer when under stress or lying."	
Pinoquio Carvalho & Huber, 2022	Spider	Pinocchio	A genus of Brazilian cellar spiders; "The generic name is taken from Carlo Collodi's fictional character, as written in Portuguese, whose famous nose reminds of the projecting clypeus in the type species". This genus was originally named Pinocchio Huber & Carvalho, 2019, but this name turned out to be a junior homonym that had been used before, for the harvestman genus Pinocchio Mello-Leitão, 1940 (now considered a synonym of Bresslauius Mello-Leitão, 1935). Therefore, the genus name was amended to Pinoquio.	
Rhinocosmetus pinocchio Vanuytven, Jocqué & Deeleman-Reinhold, 2024	Spider	Pinocchio	"The male of this species is recognized by the very long clypeal protrusion, longer than in other species"	

=== Sir Arthur Conan Doyle (1859–1930) ===
Taxon	Type	Named for	Notes	Ref
†Irritator challengeri Martill, et al., 1996	Theropod dinosaur	Professor Challenger, The Lost World	Named after "Professor Challenger, the fictitious hero and dinosaur discoverer of Sir Arthur Conan Doyle's [The] Lost World"	
Mandevilla sherlockii L.O.Alvarado & Lozada-Pérez (2017)	Rocktrumpet	Sherlock Holmes	"The name is dedicated to the fictional character Sherlock Holmes [who] reflects much of the work of taxonomists and scientists in general, which is entirely detective work. Additionally, he was conceived as an amateur botanist, mainly interested in plants that can be used as poisons"	

=== Rudyard Kipling (1865–1936) ===
Taxon	Type	Named for	Notes	Ref
Akela Peckham & Peckham, 1896	Jumping spider	Akela, The Jungle Book		
Bagheera kiplingi Peckham & Peckham, 1896	Jumping spider	Bagheera and Rudyard Kipling, The Jungle Book		
Messua Peckham & Peckham, 1896	Jumping spider	Messua, The Jungle Book		
Nagaina Peckham & Peckham, 1896	Jumping spider	Nagaina, "Rikki-Tikki-Tavi"		

=== Cyrano de Bergerac (1897) ===
Taxon	Type	Named for	Notes	Ref
Garra cyrano Kottelat, 2000	Log sucker fish	Cyrano de Bergerac, Cyrano de Bergerac (play)	"From Cyrano de Bergerac, the main character in a comedy of Edmond Rostand, characterized by a long nose"; this species has a "snout with a conspicuous, deeply notched secondary rostrum with large tubercles"	
Eremobates cyranoi Cushing & Brookhart, 2016	Camel spider	Cyrano de Bergerac, Cyrano de Bergerac (play)	"Referencing the twisted upturned fixed finger reminiscent of the reputed nose of Edmond Rostand's Cyrano de Bergerac."	
Epimeria cyrano d'Udekem d'Acoz & Verheye, 2017	Amphipod	Cyrano de Bergerac, Cyrano de Bergerac (play)	"Cyrano de Bergerac is the central character of the eponymous play by Edmond Rostand. In the play, Cyrano is described as endowed with a prominent nose. The name [...] alludes to the long, straight and anteriorly directed rostrum of the species."	

=== Dracula (1897) ===
Taxon	Type	Named for	Notes	Ref
†Bradycneme draculae Harrison & Walker, 1975	Theropod dinosaur	Count Dracula	"The specific name is derived from the Romanian word dracul meaning evil one." The fossil was discovered in Transylvania, the setting of Bram Stoker's Dracula.	
Dracula vampira Luer (1978)	Orchid	Count Dracula		
Liparis draculoides Greenwood (1982)	Orchid	Count Dracula		
†Desmodus draculae Morgan, Linares and Ray, 1988	Bat	Count Dracula	"The specific epithet of this largest known chiropteran vampire commemorates Count Dracula, the greatest human vampire of folklore"	
Draculoides bramstokeri Harvey & Humphreys, 1995	Whip scorpion	Count Dracula, Bram Stoker	"The generic name alludes to another toothed creature"	
Chelaner draculai (Heterick, 2001)	Ant	Count Dracula	The name was "inspired by the spinose clypeal teeth." This species was originally described as Monomorium draculai and subsequently transferred to genus Chelaner.	
Imajimaea draculai (San Martín & López, 2002)	Polychaete worm	Count Dracula	"The arrangement of the trepan teeth, consisting of two large, fang-shaped teeth and many small ones in between, is reminiscent of a vampire mouth; thus, the species is named after Dracula, the literary vampire." Originally described as Paraprocerastea draculai and subsequently transferred to genus Imajimaea.	
Danionella dracula Britz, Conway & Rüber, 2009	Ray-finned fish	Count Dracula	"The species name dracula alludes to the long tooth-like fangs in the jaws in males of the new species and was inspired by Count Dracula in Bram Stoker's novel."	
†Deinocroton draculi Peñalver et al., 2017	Tick	Count Dracula	"Patronym for the main character of the gothic horror novel by Irish writer Abraham "Bram" Stoker, which is a fictionalised account of Vlad III, or Vlad Dracula"	
†Gonostoma dracula Grădianu, Přikryl, Gregorová & Harold, 2017	Fish	Count Dracula	A fossil species of bristlemouth from the Oligocene of Romania, "named after the Romanian famous fictional character from the Bram Stoker novel; the teeth of the new species resemble vampire fangs."	
†Supraserphites draculi Rasnitsyn & Öhm-Kühnle, 2019	Wasp	Count Dracula	"Species name derived from dracul, Romanian for devil, and the literary figure Count Dracula"	
Patrera dracula Martínez, Brescovit, Villarreal & Oliveira, 2021	Spider	Count Dracula	"The epithet in apposition referring to the mythological vampire Dracula, alluding to the large chelicerae, which resemble Dracula's fangs."	
Bensonella dracula Gojšina, Hunyadi & Páll-Gergely, 2025	Snail	Count Dracula	"Two strong palatal tubercles of this species resemble teeth of a vampire."	

=== Peter Pan (1904–1911) ===
Taxon	Type	Named for	Notes	Ref
Tinkerbella nana Huber & Noyes, 2013	Fairyfly	Tinker Bell and Nana	"After the fairy Tinker Bell in the 1904 play 'Peter Pan' by J.M. Barrie [and] the dog Nana in Peter Pan and coincidentally from nanos, the Greek word for dwarf."	
Ischnothyreus hooki Kranz-Baltensperger, 2011	Goblin spider	Captain Hook	"The specific name is derived from Captain Hook from the novel Peter Pan, written by James M. Barrie, and refers to the similarity of the distal part of the male palp with the left arm of Captain Hook."	
Meoneura tinkerbellae Stucke, 2016	Fly	Tinker Bell	"Tinker Bell is a long haired and very small fairy as Meoneura tinkerbellae is a very small, hardly visible fly with characteristically long setulae on tergite 5."	

=== The Village in the Jungle (1913) ===
Taxon	Type	Named for	Notes	Ref
Boagrius silindui Benjamin, 2024	Spider	Silindu	Three palp-footed spider species endemic to Sri Lanka, named after characters of The Village in the Jungle by Leonard Woolf, published in 1913, based on his experiences as a civil servant in Sri Lanka.	
Steriphopus hinnihamiae Benjamin, 2024	Spider	Hinnihami	Three palp-footed spider species endemic to Sri Lanka, named after characters of The Village in the Jungle by Leonard Woolf, published in 1913, based on his experiences as a civil servant in Sri Lanka.	
Steriphopus punchimenikae Benjamin, 2024	Spider	Punchi Menika	Three palp-footed spider species endemic to Sri Lanka, named after characters of The Village in the Jungle by Leonard Woolf, published in 1913, based on his experiences as a civil servant in Sri Lanka.	

=== H. P. Lovecraft (1890–1937) ===
Taxon	Type	Named for	Notes	Ref
Pimoa cthulhu Hormiga, 1994	Spider	Cthulhu	"Named after H.P. Lovecraft's mythological deity Cthulhu, akin to the powers of Chaos"	
†Millerocaulis tekelili Vera (2012)	Fern	"Tekeli-li"	"The specific epithet derives from the word Tekeli-li, pronounced by fictional Antarctic inhabitants in the book 'The Narrative of Arthur Gordon Pym of Nantucket' by Edgar [Allan] Poe and in the book 'At the [M]ountains of [M]adness' by Howard Phillips Lovecraft.	
Nanocthulhu lovecrafti Buffington, 2012	Wasp	Cthulhu, H. P. Lovecraft	"Cthulhu's [sic] is described as having 'a pulpy, tentacled head,' and the clypeal fuscina described herein is reminiscent of Cthulhu's head"	
Cthulhu macrofasciculumque James & Keeling, 2012	Parabasalid	Cthulhu	"The tentacle-headed appearance given by the coordinated beat pattern of the anterior flagellar bundle of Cthulhu cells is reminiscent of this demon"	
Cthylla microfasciculumque James & Keeling, 2012	Parabasalid	Cthylla	Cthylla "was the secret daughter of Cthulhu [...] It is here named as a smaller and simpler relative of the parabasalian genus Cthulhu"	
Ochyrocera atlachnacha Brescovit et al., 2018	Spider	Atlach-Nacha	The specific name "refers to Atlach-Nacha, a supernatural entity from Cthulhu mythology that resembles a huge spider with an almost human face"	
Yogsothoth Shishkin & Zlatogursky, 2018	Centrohelid	Yog-Sothoth	Yog-Sothoth "was described as a conglomeration of glowing spheres". The genus is in the family Yogsothothidae.	
†Sollasina cthulhu Rahman et al., 2019	Echinoderm	Cthulhu Mythos	"Named for the Cthulhu mythos of H. P. Lovecraft, a fictional universe populated with bizarre tentacled monsters"	
Fujuriphyes dagon Cepeda, Pardos, Zeppilli & Sánchez, 2020	Mud dragon	Dagon (Cthulhu Mythos)	"The species is named after the fictional deity Dagon (also known as Father Dagon), created by the American writer of horror fiction H.P. Lovecraft (1890–1937) and firstly introduced in the short story "Dagon," published in 1919. In the pantheon of Lovecraftian cosmic entities, Dagon presides over the Deep Ones, an amphibious humanoid race indigenous to Earth's oceans."	
Fujuriphyes hydra Cepeda, Pardos, Zeppilli & Sánchez, 2020	Mud dragon	Hydra (Cthulhu Mythos)	"The species is named after the fictional deity Hydra (also known as Mother Hydra), created by the American writer of cosmic horror fiction H.P. Lovecraft (1890–1937) and firstly introduced in the short story The Shadow over Innsmouth, published in 1936. In the pantheon of Lovecraftian cosmic entities, Mother Hydra is the consort of Father Dagon."	
Fujuriphyes cthulhu Cepeda, Pardos, Zeppilli & Sánchez, 2020	Mud dragon	Cthulhu	"The species is named after the fictional cosmic entity Cthulhu, created by the American writer of horror fiction H.P. Lovecraft (1890–1937) and firstly introduced in the short story "The Call of Cthulhu", published in 1928. Considered a Great Old One within the pantheon of Lovecraftian cosmic entities, Cthulhu is a gigantic being of great power described as looking like an octopus or a dragon that lies in a death-like torpor in the sunken city of R'lyeh."	

=== Zorro (1919–present) ===
Taxon	Type	Named for	Notes	Ref
Pristimantis zorro Rivera-Correa & Daza, 2020	Frog	Zorro	"The specific name is a patronym in reference to the character El Zorro (fox in Spanish). El Zorro is the secret identity of Don Diego de la Vega, a fictional hero created in 1919 by pulp writer Johnston McCulley. The character has a distinctive black garb, coat, hat and a mask that covers the top of the head from eye level upwards. The name alludes to the facial mask of the new species."	
Ceroptres zorroi Nastasi, Smith & Davis, 2024	Wasp	Zorro	"Named for Zorro, a fictional character originating in early-1900s pulp fiction novels. Zorro is portrayed as a thief, trickster, and master of disguise. The application of this name to C. zorroi is especially apt given that Zorro's characteristic black garb and mask is resembled by the black coloration of the head and mesosoma of C. zorroi."	

=== Winnie-the-Pooh (1925–1928) ===
Taxon	Type	Named for	Notes	Ref
Eeyorius hutchinsi Paulin, 1986	Ray-finned fish	Eeyore	"Named for Eeyore, a literary character who lived in damp places."	
Potamalpheops tigger Yeo & Ng, 1997	Shrimp	Tigger	Named after Tigger to reference "the bold striped appearance of freshly caught live specimens".	

=== Macunaíma (1928) ===
Taxon	Type	Named for	Notes	Ref
Ituglanis macunaima Datovo & Landim, 2005	Catfish	Macunaíma	"From the modernist Brazilian masterpiece by Mário de Andrade – "Macunaíma: o herói sem nenhum caráter" – meaning the hero without any character, in reference of the absence of any exclusive (taxonomic) character for the new species. Mário de Andrade's Macunaíma was based in folk Amazonian indian myth, and also presents infantile features, in allusion to the paedomorphic characters of the new species."	
Neotropiella macunaimae Queiroz, Da Silveira & De Mendonça, 2013	Springtail	Macunaíma	A species from Brazil named "After the book Macunaíma, written by the Brazilian author Mário de Andrade in 1928. The book narrates a surreal and comic story about the homonymous character, Macunaíma, and represents the multicultural aspects of Brazilian life."	
Eucampesmella macunaima Bouzan, Iniesta, Pena-Barbosa & Brescovit, 2021	Millipede	Macunaíma, Macunaíma	A species from Brazil named as "a reference to the Brazilian literature character "Macunaíma" from the book "Macunaíma: O herói sem nenhum caráter" written by Mário de Andrade."	

=== Enid Blyton (1897–1968) ===
Taxon	Type	Named for	Notes	Ref
Cavisternum bom Ranasinghe & Benjamin, 2018	Goblin spider	Bom, "The Goblins Looking-Glass"	"This specific name is a noun in apposition named after 'Bom' a magnificent goblin in the story of 'The Goblins Looking-Glass' by Enid Blyton (1947)."	
Pelicinus tumpy Ranasinghe & Benjamin, 2018	Goblin spider	Tumpy, "The Goblins Looking-Glass"	"This species is a noun in apposition named after 'Tumpy' a little goblin in the story, The Goblins Looking-Glass by Blyton (1947)."	
Pelicinus snooky Ranasinghe & Benjamin, 2018	Goblin spider	Snooky, "The Firework Goblins"	"This species a noun in apposition named after 'Snooky' a goblin and a main character in the story 'The Firework Goblins' written by Blyton in 1971."	
Ischnothyreus chippy Ranasinghe & Benjamin, 2018	Goblin spider	Chippy, "Billy's Little Boats"	"This species name is a noun in apposition named after 'Chippy' a brownie and one of the characters in the story 'Billy's Little Boats' by Blyton (1971). Brownies possess queer little pointed feet like goblins."	
Silhouettella snippy Ranasinghe & Benjamin, 2018	Goblin spider	Snippy, "Billy's Little Boats"	"This species is a noun in apposition named after 'Snippy' a brownie and one of the characters in the story 'Billy's Little Boats' by Blyton in 1971."	
Silhouettella tiggy Ranasinghe & Benjamin, 2018	Goblin spider	Tiggy, "Billy's Little Boats"	"This species is a noun in apposition named after "Tiggy" a brownie and one of the characters in the story 'Billy's Little Boats' by Blyton in 1971."	

=== Vladimir Nabokov (1899–1977) ===
Taxon	Type	Named for	Notes	Ref
Pseudolucia aureliana Bálint & Johnson, 1993	Butterfly	"The Aurelian"	"Named from Nabokov's short story 'The Aurelian' in which a devoted butterfly collector is unable to fulfill his dream of journeying to the tropics."	
Pseudolucia charlotte Bálint & Johnson, 1993	Butterfly	Charlotte Haze, Lolita	"Named for 'Charlotte Haze' Lolita's mother in Nabokov's novel Lolita."	
Pseudolucia clarea Bálint & Johnson, 1993	Butterfly	Clare Quilty, Lolita	"Named for 'Clare Quilty', the rival of Lolita's paramour 'Humbert' in Nabokov's novel Lolita."	
Pseudolucia hazeorum Bálint & Johnson, 1993	Butterfly	Haze family, Lolita	"A double meaning, the denotative of 'haze' referring to the dark wing bands characterizing the species, but signifying also Nabokov's characters of the Haze family in Lolita-- the infamous Lolita and her mother Charlotte."	
Pseudolucia zembla Bálint & Johnson, 1993	Butterfly	Zembla, Pale Fire	"Named for the mythical kingdom 'Zembla' claimed to have been ruled by Nabokov's character Kinbote in the novel Pale Fire."	
Itylos pnin Bálint, 1993	Butterfly	Timofey Pavlovich Pnin, Pnin	The species is "named for the Russian emigre professor in Nabokov's novel Pnin."	
Madeleinea lolita Bálint, 1993	Butterfly	Lolita	"Named for 'Lolita', the nickname of the Nabokov's best-known character— the pre-teen nymphet Dolores in the well-known novel Lolita."	
Madeleinea mashenka Bálint, 1993	Butterfly	Mashen'ka, the Russian title of Mary	"'Mashenka' (Mary) was the title of the first novel published by Nabokov in Russian."	
Paralycaeides shade Bálint, 1993	Butterfly	John Shade, Pale Fire	The species is "named for 'John Shade', the imaginary New England poet and author of Nabokov's Pale Fire."	
Nabokovia ada Bálint & Johnson, 1994	Butterfly	Ada Veen, Ada or Ardor: A Family Chronicle		
Madeleinea cobaltana Bálint & Lamas, 1994	Butterfly	Kobaltana, Pale Fire		
Madeleinea nodo Bálint & Johnson, 1994	Butterfly	Nodo, Pale Fire	"Named for 'Nodo', half-brother of Odon, signifying the sister relationship with M. odon and the fact that, of the two, 'Nodo' occurs geographically to the [no]rth."	
Madeleinea odon Bálint & Johnson, 1994	Butterfly	Odon, Pale Fire	"Named for 'Odon', half brother of Nodo and further suggesting the interesting diversity of the koa Species Group."	
Madeleinea tintarrona Bálint & Johnson, 1994	Butterfly	Tintarron, Pale Fire	"From Nabokov's 'Tintarron', a precious deep blue glass made in the mountains of Zembla, here referring to the dorsal ground color of this species"	
Leptotes krug Bálint et al., 1995	Butterfly	Adam Krug, Bend Sinister	Named for "the 'unfortunate professor' Krug in Vladimir Nabokov's novel Bend Sinister [...] 'krug' also means 'circle' in Russian. [The] ventral maculation in this genus includes circles or ellipses of white which enclose patches of brown ground color."	
Leptotes delalande Bálint et al., 1995	Butterfly	Pierre Delalande, Invitation to a Beheading	"Named for 'Delalande', a philosopher invented by Nabokov as his alter-ego, here reflecting the sister relationship of this new species with L. lamasi."	
Pseudolucia humbert Bálint & Johnson, 1995	Butterfly	"Humbert Humbert", Lolita	"Named from Humbert, a central character in Nabokov's novel Lolita. We refrain here from adding the genitive 'i' since the character was imaginary and obviously masculine."	
Pseudolucia zina Benyamini, Bálint & Johnson, 1995	Butterfly	Zina Mertz, The Gift	"Zina is perhaps the closest Nabokov came to placing his own wife, Vera, into his fictions. In brief, Zina is the most ideal of all Nabokov's female characters."	
Paralycaeides hazelea Bálint and Johnson, 1995	Butterfly	Hazel Shade, Pale Fire	"[T]he name is after Shade's daughter Hazel, in Nabokov's Pale Fire, whose suicide is at [the] center of Shade's poem and who turns up, after her death and just before Shade's, in the form of a butterfly."	
Madeleinea ardisensis Bálint & Lamas, 1996	Butterfly	Ardis Hall, Ada or Ardor: A Family Chronicle		
Plebejus ardis Bálint & Johnson, 1997	Butterfly	Ardis Hall, Ada or Ardor: A Family Chronicle	"Dr. Proffer notes that 'Ardis' was the name of the great estate ('Ardis Hall') in Nabokov's novel Ada, where Van and Ada (Nabokov's only lepidopterist heroine) began their life-long love affair."	
Plebejus pilgram Bálint & Johnson, 1997	Butterfly	Paul Pilgram, "The Aurelian"	Dr. Simon Karlinsk: "'Pilgram' was the protagonist in Nabokov's story 'The Aurelian' The German owner of a butterfly shop, he dreamed all his life of hunting butterflies in exotic locales but, as he was about to realize his dreams, died of a heart attack."	
Plebejus pilgram Bálint & Lamas, 1998	Butterfly	Mira Belochkin, Pnin	"Gayla Diment [...] proposed 'Mira', the first name of Pnin's beloved who died in a Nazi camp. It is fitting that a butterfly, often representing the human soul, should bear her name."	
Plebejus fyodor Hsu, Bálint & Johnson, 2000	Butterfly	Fyodor Godunov-Cherdyntsev, The Gift	"Fyodor narrates Nabokov's novel The Gift, a record of his love of Russian literature, his lepidopterist father, butterflies, and a young woman named Zina."	
Humbert humberti Sime & Wahl, 2002	Wasp	"Humbert Humbert", Lolita	"The genus is after the hapless Humbert Humbert of Nabokov's novel, Lolita"	

=== Jorge Amado (1912–2001) ===
Taxon	Type	Named for	Notes	Ref
Lasioseius gabrielae Santos & Argolo, 2018	Mite	Gabriela, Gabriela, Clove and Cinnamon	The type locality (Ilhéus) is very close to Jorge Amado's birthplace, Itabuna, both in the state of Bahia, Brazil. A closely related species was concurrently named Lasioseius jorgeamadoi in the writer's honor.	
Forcepsioneura gabriela Pimenta, Pinto & Takiya, 2019	Damselfly	Gabriela, Gabriela, Clove and Cinnamon	"after the strong female character of the famous novel Gabriela, cravo e canela by Brazilian writer Jorge Amado. The novel is set in the region of the type locality at the beginning of the 20th century, when the southern coast of Bahia prospered from the exploitation of cacao trees."	
Eucampesmella pedrobala Bouzan, Iniesta, Pena-Barbosa & Brescovit, 2021	Millipede	Pedro Bala, Captains of the Sands	A species from Brazil named as "a reference to the Brazilian literature character "Pedro Bala" from the book "Capitães da Areia" written by Jorge Amado."	
†Tietasaura Bandeira et al., 2024	Dinosaur	Tieta	"The generic epithet is a combination of Tieta (nickname for Antonieta in Portuguese) and -saura (σαύρα), the genitive form of -saurus and meaning lizard in ancient Greek. The name Tieta honours the main character from the homonymous novel Tieta do Agreste by the famous author Jorge Amado, who was born in Bahia and lived in Salvador City [the type locality]. The name Antonieta further means 'priceless', alluding to the value of Tietasaura derbyiana sp. nov. as the first nominal ornithischian species from Brazil."	

=== Foundation (1942–1993) ===
Taxon	Type	Named for	Notes	Ref
Ceroptres demerzelae Nastasi, Smith & Davis, 2024	Gall wasp	Demerzel	"Named for Demerzel, an android who serves as the loyal aide to the Emperors of the Galaxy in Isaac Asimov's Foundation series as well as the recent television adaptation. In the television series, she fulfills a role similar to that of an inquiline, appearing to act in the best interest of one of the emperors, only to later usurp the emperors' authority."	
Ceroptres mallowi Nastasi, Smith & Davis, 2024	Gall wasp	Hober Mallow	"Named for Hober Mallow, a character in Isaac Asimov's Foundation franchise who is portrayed as a trickster who plays an essential role in orchestrating an uprising against the oppressive Empire."	

=== Gabriel García Márquez (1927–2014) ===
Taxon	Type	Named for	Notes	Ref
Rugitermes ursulae Casalla, Scheffrahn & Korb, 2021	Termite	Úrsula Iguarán, One Hundred Years of Solitude	This species is native to Colombia. "Ursulae derived from a diminutive of the Latin ursa, which means "little bear", in line with the small size of the species. Ursula is also the name of José Arcadio Buendía's wife in the novel One hundred years of solitude written by Gabriel García Márquez and represents an apology/symbolism for the spiritual engine, entrepreneurship, and hard and silent work of many women around the world."	
Paratropis aurelianoi Tauber, Perafán, & Pérez-Miles, 2025	Spider	Aureliano Buendía, One Hundred Years of Solitude	"in honor of Aureliano Buendía, the main character of Cien Años de Soledad the famous novel of Gabriel García Márquez, born in Aracataca, Magdalena, the Department where the species was found."	
Lepanthes nasariana J.S.Moreno & Hazzi	Orchid	Santiago Nasar, Chronicle of a Death Foretold	This species is native to Colombia. "The name was chosen in allusion to the character's tragic fate—unaware of the threats around him, he is doomed to die prematurely. This mirrors the situation of the newly described species: although it may appear stable today, its extinction is predicted in the near future. The species is expected to undergo a "foretold death" due to the increasing frequency and intensity of extreme climatic events, driven by anthropogenic acceleration of climate change. While climate has always fluctuated naturally, it is the unprecedented speed and magnitude of current shifts—caused by human activity—that now pose a critical threat to biodiversity."	

=== Dune (1963–1985) ===
Taxon	Type	Named for	Notes	Ref
Synothele arrakis Raven, 1994	Spider	Arrakis	"A noun taken from the Frank Herbert novel, Dune, in which the desert planet is known as Arrakis. Sands of the desert planet yield a 'spice' which changes the eye colour in users to deep blue. The anterior median eyes of the types have a deep blue colour, unusual in spider eyes."	
†Arrakiscolex Leibach et al., 2021	Palaeoscolecid	Arrakis, sandworms	A fossil from the Cambrian of Utah, USA. "The name refers to the fictional planet of Arrakis in the novel 'Dune' by Frank Herbert, which is inhabited by a species of armoured worm."	
Lycosa gesserit Steinpress et al., 2022	Spider	Bene Gesserit	"Species named after the order of Bene Gesserit, from Frank Herbert's 1965 novel, Dune."	
†Shaihuludia Kimmig et al., 2023	Polychaete	Sandworms	A fossil from the Cambrian of Utah, USA. "Shai-Hulud: the indigenous name for the sandworms on the planet Arrakis in the Dune novels written by Frank Herbert." One of the authors, Rhiannon LaVine, said "It was the first thing that came to mind, because I'm a big ol' nerd and at the time I was getting really excited for the 'Dune' movies."	
Scherotheca shaihulud Marchán & Decaëns, 2023	Earthworm	Sandworms	"The species name is derived from the fictional giant sandworm Shai Hulud, from the science fiction novel Dune written by Frank Herbert."	
Tulostoma shaihuludii Finy et al., 2023	Fungus	Sandworms	"Reminiscent of the sandworm Shai-Hulud of the fictional planet Arrakis from the science fiction novel series Dune by Frank Herbert."	
Arrakis Robillard, Tan & Su, 2024	Cricket	Arrakis	"The genus is named after the fictional desert planet featured in the Dune series of novels by Frank Herbert, in reference to the desert regions where the members of this genus are distributed."	
Microphis arrakisae Haÿ et al., 2024	Pipefish	Arrakis	"This new species of freshwater pipefish is named Microphis arrakisae in reference to Arrakis, the fictional planet from Frank Herbert's novel Dune, as a tribute to this influential work of science fiction. Arrakis is predominantly covered in sand and rocks and is famously inhabited by giant sandworms known as "Shai-Hulud". Microphis arrakisae sp. nov. is named after this planet due to its yellowish in vivo coloration, which resembles the color of sand, and its behavior of moving between rocks, akin to a snake or a worm. This movement is reminiscent of the planet's giant sandworms and reflects the etymology of the generic name Microphis (from Greek micro, meaning small, and ophis, meaning snake)."	
Nylanderia usul Williams, Williams, LaPolla & Lucky, 2025	Ant	Paul Atreides (Usul)	"The species epithet is derived from Frank Herbert's science fiction novel Dune. In the novel, "Usul" is the secret name given to the protagonist, Paul Atreides, by the Fremen, the desert dwellers of the planet Arrakis. This name references the species' moderate to intense blue iridescence, alluding to the "blue-within-blue" eyes that Paul acquires after joining the Fremen and consuming the spice melange. The term "Usul" translates to "the strength of the base of the pillar" and is derived from the Arabic word usul, the plural form of asl, which means "origin", "root", or "principle"."	
Voeltzkowia shaihulud Miralles et al., 2025	Skink	Sandworms	A "sand-swimming skink" whose name is "derived from 'Shai-Hulud', the name given by the Fremen people to the mythical giant sand worms of the planet Arrakis, also known as Dune, in the eponymous science fiction novel published by Frank Herbert in 1965."	

=== Jára Cimrman (1966-) ===
Taxon	Type	Named for	Notes	Ref
Isospora jaracimrmani Modrý & Koudela, 1995	Protist	Jára Cimrman	A parasite of chameleons described by Czech scientists and named "in honour of Jára Cimrman, a popular Czech theatre hero."	
Apodemus uralensis cimrmani Vohralík, 2002	Mouse	Jára Cimrman	This subspecies is endemic to a small area of North Bohemia, Czech Republic, and "named after Mr. Jára Cimrman, a famous inventor, traveller and the principal of the touring theatre who, in the beginning of 20th century has operated in Bohemia"	
Butheoloides cimrmani Kovařík, 2003	Scorpion	Jára Cimrman	"Named after Jára Cimrman, a well known Czech renaissance man."	
Heterometrus cimrmani Kovařík, 2004	Scorpion	Jára Cimrman	"Named after Jára Cimrman, a well known Czech renaissance man. Jára Cimrman bred large Heterometrus from Thailand and Malaysia and in his log noted that they must be two species with different sexual dimorphism (Heterometrus spinifer and the species described here). Regrettably, he has not published the observation."	
Parabuthus cimrmani Kovařík, 2004	Scorpion	Jára Cimrman	"Named after Jára Cimrman, a well known Czech renaissance man."	
Rhamphomyia cimrmani Barták, 2006	Fly	Jára Cimrman	"The species is named in honour of the Czech imaginary inventor, Jára da Cimrman."	
Cimrmanium Bílý, 2009	Beetle	Jára Cimrman	"named after the famous Czech traveller, innovator and the last Czech polyhistorian, Jára Cimrman."	
Chaerilus cimrmani Kovařík, 2012	Scorpion	Jára Cimrman	"Named after Jára Cimrman, a well known Czech renaissance man."	
Calochaete cimrmanii Hauer, Bohunická & Mühlsteinová, 2013	Cyanobacteria	Jára Cimrman	"The species is named after the mythical Czech scientist, dramatist, poet, and writer Jára Cimrman."	
†Cimrmaniela Frýda, Ferrová & Frýdová, 2013	Sea snail	Jára Cimrman	A fossil genus from the Devonian of the Czech Republic, named "in honour of Jára Cimrman, who was one of the greatest Czech universal scientists and artists of the 19th and early 20th century."	
Rubus jarae-cimrmanii M.Lepší, P.Lepší, Trávn. & Žíla	Bramble	Jára Cimrman	This species is endemic to the Czech Republic and is named for "the fictitious Czech genius Jára Cimrman, who was, without a shadow of doubt, deeply interested, among all other branches of science, also in batology."	
†Longicrusa jaracimrmani Tihelka, Huang & Cai, 2020	Beetle	Jára Cimrman	A fossil species found in Cretaceous Burmese amber, "named in honour of Jára Cimrman, a Czech theatre hero."	
Antikuna cimrmani Kaderka, Ferretti & Hüsser, 2021	Tarantula	Jára Cimrman	"dedicated to Jára Cimrman, one of the greatest Czech playwrights, poets, composers, teachers, travellers, philosophers, inventors, detectives, mathematicians, and sportsmen of the 19th and early 20th century."	
Collybiopsis cimrmanii Ševčíková & P.-A. Moreau (2022)	Fungus	Jára Cimrman	" in honour of 'The greatest Czech Jára Cimrman', a great playwright, poet, musician, teacher, traveller, philosopher, inventor, scientist, criminologist and athlete."	

=== Aubrey–Maturin series (1969-2004) ===
Taxon	Type	Named for	Notes	Ref
Ledermanniella maturiniana Beentje (2005)	Riverweed	Stephen Maturin		
Theognete maturini Anderson, 2010	Weevil	Stephen Maturin	"The dedication was arranged through a donation to Nature Discovery Fund of the Canadian Museum of Nature by The Gunroom of HMSSurprise.org."	

=== The Hitchhiker's Guide to the Galaxy (1978-2009) ===
Taxon	Type	Named for	Notes	Ref
Erechthias beeblebroxi Robinson & Nelson, 1993	Moth	Zaphod Beeblebrox		
Bidenichthys beeblebroxi Paulin, 1995	Viviparous brotula fish	Zaphod Beeblebrox	"Named for Zaphod Beeblebrox, President of the Galaxy in The [Hitchhiker's] Guide to the Galaxy by Douglas Adams."	
Fiordichthys slartibartfasti Paulin, 1995	Viviparous brotula fish	Slartibartfast	"Named for Slartibartfast, designer of fiords in The [Hitchhiker's] Guide to the Galaxy by Douglas Adams."	
†Babelichthys Davesne, 2017	Crestfish	Babelfish	Named after the "teleost-like, ear-dwelling, polyglot" Babel Fish "in reference to the very peculiar, almost alien-like, appearance of the genus".	

=== The Neverending Story (1979) ===
Taxon	Type	Named for	Notes	Ref
†Larachelus morla Pérez-García & Murelaga, 2012	Turtle	Morla	A fossil species from the Cretaceous of Spain, with a vaulted carapace, whose "specific name refers to 'Morla,' a fictional swamp turtle with a high carapace (the 'Tortoise Shell Mountain') from the fantasy novel 'Die unendliche Gesichichte' ('The Neverending Story') by Michael Ende (1979)."	
Fujuriphyes Sánchez et al., 2016	Mud dragon	Falkor (Fujur in the Spanish translation; the lead author is Spanish)	"From Fujur, the dog-dragon in the novel The Neverending Story by M. Ende + Greek phyes, the commonly used suffix in names of Allomalorhagid genera. The name adds to the list of kinorhynch (mud dragons) species named after dragons and also refers to the study of kinorhynch phylogeny as a "never-ending story"."	
Asclepias graogramanii L.O.Alvarado, M.G.Chávez & J.A.Álvarez	Flowering plant	Grograman (Graógramán in the original German)	"The name of the new species refers to the fictional character Graograman, a multicolored lion from Michael Ende's novel "The Neverending Story", due to the colorful flowers".	
Polystemma atreyui Pío-León, L.O.Alvarado & S.Islas	Flowering plant	Atreyu	"The name refers to the fictional character Atreyu from Michael Ende's novel "The Neverending Story." Atreyu is a member of the green-skinned tribe that lives in the Grassy Plain. He is sent to search for a cure to save the world of Fantasia. His story is similar to our own work as botanists trying to conserve our world under the threat of disappearance from multiple causes, such as climate change."	
†Manouria morla Chroust, Szczygielski & Luján, 2025	Tortoise	Morla	A fossil species from the Miocene of the Czech Republic, "named after Morla, a fantasy character from the book The Neverending Story (orig. Die unendliche Geschichte) written by Michael Ende (1929–1995), firstly published in 1979, later adapted as a movie in 1984. Morla, the Ancient One, is a giant tortoise who lives in the Swamps of Sadness. The new species described herein is the oldest known species of the genus from the Early Miocene of Czechia; therefore, the Ancient One. Its remains come from the swamp deposits of Ahníkov, a parallel to the Swamps of Sadness."	

=== Discworld (1983-2015) ===
Taxon	Type	Named for	Notes	Ref
†Czekanowskia anguae Watson et al., 2001	Gymnosperm	Angua von Überwald	"In tribute to the author Terry Pratchett OBE, all the new fossil plant species diagnosed and described in this paper are named for fictional characters who appear in his series of Discworld novels."	
†Ginkgoites weatherwaxiae Watson et al., 2001	Ginkgo	Granny Weatherwax	"In tribute to the author Terry Pratchett OBE, all the new fossil plant species diagnosed and described in this paper are named for fictional characters who appear in his series of Discworld novels."	
†Ginkgoites nannyoggiae Watson et al., 2001	Ginkgo	Nanny Ogg	"In tribute to the author Terry Pratchett OBE, all the new fossil plant species diagnosed and described in this paper are named for fictional characters who appear in his series of Discworld novels."	
†Ginkgoites garlickianus Watson et al., 2001	Ginkgo	Magrat Garlick	"In tribute to the author Terry Pratchett OBE, all the new fossil plant species diagnosed and described in this paper are named for fictional characters who appear in his series of Discworld novels."	
†Phoenicopsis rincewindii Watson et al., 2001	Gymnosperm	Rincewind	"In tribute to the author Terry Pratchett OBE, all the new fossil plant species diagnosed and described in this paper are named for fictional characters who appear in his series of Discworld novels."	
†Pseudotorellia vimesiana Watson et al., 2001	Conifer	Sam Vimes	"In tribute to the author Terry Pratchett OBE, all the new fossil plant species diagnosed and described in this paper are named for fictional characters who appear in his series of Discworld novels."	
†Sciadopityoides greeboana Watson et al., 2001	Gymnosperm	Greebo, Nanny Ogg's cat	"In tribute to the author Terry Pratchett OBE, all the new fossil plant species diagnosed and described in this paper are named for fictional characters who appear in his series of Discworld novels."	
†Sulcatocladus dibbleri Watson et al., 2001	Conifer	C.M.O.T. Dibbler	"In tribute to the author Terry Pratchett OBE, all the new fossil plant species diagnosed and described in this paper are named for fictional characters who appear in his series of Discworld novels."	
†Torreyites detriti Watson et al., 2001	Conifer	Detritus	"In tribute to the author Terry Pratchett OBE, all the new fossil plant species diagnosed and described in this paper are named for fictional characters who appear in his series of Discworld novels."	
Apseudes atuini Bamber, 2005	Crustacean	Great A'Tuin		
Bathytanais greebo Bamber, 2005	Crustacean	Greebo, Nanny Ogg's cat		
Tanaella dongo Bamber, 2005	Crustacean	Crocodile Dongo		
Aleiodes achingae Butcher et al., 2012	Wasp	Tiffany Aching		
Aleiodes adorabelleae Butcher et al., 2012	Wasp	Adora Belle Dearheart		
Aleiodes anguaae Butcher et al., 2012	Wasp	Angua von Überwald		
Aleiodes atuin Butcher et al., 2012	Wasp	Great A'Tuin		
Aleiodes binkyi Butcher et al., 2012	Wasp	Binky, Death's horse		
Aleiodes conina Butcher et al., 2012	Wasp	Conina		
Aleiodes deathi Butcher et al., 2012	Wasp	Edward d'Eath		
Aleiodes deyoyoi Butcher et al., 2012	Wasp	Kompt de Yoyo		
Aleiodes downeyi Butcher et al., 2012	Wasp	Lord Downey		
Aleiodes flannelfooti Butcher et al., 2012	Wasp	Zlorf Flannelfoot	"Named after the assassin character Zlorf Flannelfoot in the Terry Pratchett Discworld novel and in allusion to the pectinate claws."	
Aleiodes gaspodei Butcher et al., 2012	Wasp	Gaspode the Wonder Dog		
Aleiodes herrena Butcher et al., 2012	Wasp	Herrena		
Aleiodes lavaeolous Butcher et al., 2012	Wasp	Lavaeolous		
Aleiodes liessa Butcher et al., 2012	Wasp	Liessa Wyrmbidder		
Aleiodes lipwigi Butcher et al., 2012	Wasp	Moist von Lipwig		
Aleiodes lipwigduplicitus Butcher et al., 2012	Wasp	Moist von Lipwig	"In reference to the duplicitous nature of the character Mr Lipwig in the Terry Pratchett Discworld novel Going Postal and hence it's easy confusion with A. lipwigi"	
Aleiodes magratae Butcher et al., 2012	Wasp	Magrat Garlick		
Aleiodes malichi Butcher et al., 2012	Wasp	Alberto Malich		
Aleiodes mericeti Butcher et al., 2012	Wasp	Mericet		
Aleiodes morti Butcher et al., 2012	Wasp	Mort		
Aleiodes nivori Butcher et al., 2012	Wasp	Grunworth Nivor		
Aleiodes ponderi Butcher et al., 2012	Wasp	Ponder Stibbons	"Named after the character Ponder Stibbons from the Terry Pratchett Discworld novels, and a pun on 'to ponder'."	
Aleiodes prillae Butcher et al., 2012	Wasp	Lady Prill		
Aleiodes pteppicymoni Butcher et al., 2012	Wasp	Pteppicymon XXVIII	"Named after the assassin character 'His Greatness the King Pteppicymon XXVIII, Lord of the Heavens ...' from the Terry Pratchett Discworld novel, in reference to lethal parasitoid biology of the wasp."	
Aleiodes ptraci Butcher et al., 2012	Wasp	Ptraci I		
Aleiodes ridcullyi Butcher et al., 2012	Wasp	Mustrum Ridcully		
Aleiodes rincewindi Butcher et al., 2012	Wasp	Rincewind		
Aleiodes sacharissa Butcher et al., 2012	Wasp	Sacharissa Cripslock		
Aleiodes selachiii Butcher et al., 2012	Wasp	Robert Selachii		
Aleiodes stibbonsi Butcher et al., 2012	Wasp	Ponder Stibbons		
Aleiodes stohelit Butcher et al., 2012	Wasp	Susan Sto Helit		
Aleiodes teatimei Butcher et al., 2012	Wasp	Jonathan Teatime		
Aleiodes tmaliaae Butcher et al., 2012	Wasp	T'malia		
Aleiodes vetinarii Butcher et al., 2012	Wasp	Havelock Vetinari		
Periclimenes rincewindi De Grave, 2014	Shrimp	Rincewind	"Rincewind is a fictional wizard in several Discworld novels by Terry Pratchett, who is well known for his ability to blend in with any situation, despite his penchant for colourful clothing."	
Dimophora rhysi Klopfstein, 2016	Wasp	Rhys Rhysson	"This particularly small Dimophora species is named after the Low King of the dwarfs, Rhys Rhysson, from the late Terry Pratchett's novel 'The Fifth Elephant', and is dedicated to its inventor and father of the Discworld series. He will be sorely missed."	
Pristomerus fourecksensis Klopfstein, 2016	Wasp	Fourecks	"This name refers to the continent 'Fourecks' in the discworld novel by the late Terry Pratchett. Fourecks has many similarities with Australia, and the name is most probably based on the XXXX beer from Queensland."	

=== The Witcher (1986–present) ===
Taxon	Type	Named for	Notes	Ref
Pseudotanais geralti Jakiel, Palero & Błażewicz, 2019	Tanaid	Geralt of Rivia	P. geralti and P. yenneferae form a pair of sister species.	
Pseudotanais yenneferae Jakiel, Palero & Błażewicz, 2019	Tanaid	Yennefer of Vengerberg	P. geralti and P. yenneferae form a pair of sister species.	

=== A Song of Ice and Fire (1996–present) ===
Taxon	Type	Named for	Notes	Ref
Laelius arryni Azevedo & Barbosa, 2014	Wasp	House Arryn	"The specific epithets of all new species are derived from some families of the book 'A Song of Ice and Fire, [A] Game of Thrones'" by George R. R. Martin	
Laelius baratheoni Azevedo & Barbosa, 2014	Wasp	House Baratheon	"The specific epithets of all new species are derived from some families of the book 'A Song of Ice and Fire, [A] Game of Thrones'" by George R. R. Martin	
Laelius lannisteri Azevedo & Barbosa, 2014	Wasp	House Lannister	"The specific epithets of all new species are derived from some families of the book 'A Song of Ice and Fire, [A] Game of Thrones'" by George R. R. Martin	
Laelius martelli Azevedo & Barbosa, 2014	Wasp	House Martell	"The specific epithets of all new species are derived from some families of the book 'A Song of Ice and Fire, [A] Game of Thrones'" by George R. R. Martin	
Laelius targaryeni Azevedo & Barbosa, 2014	Wasp	House Targaryen	"The specific epithets of all new species are derived from some families of the book 'A Song of Ice and Fire, [A] Game of Thrones'" by George R. R. Martin	
Laelius tullyi Azevedo & Barbosa, 2014	Wasp	House Tully	"The specific epithets of all new species are derived from some families of the book 'A Song of Ice and Fire, [A] Game of Thrones'" by George R. R. Martin	
Laelius starki Azevedo & Barbosa, 2014	Wasp	House Stark	"The specific epithets of all new species are derived from some families of the book 'A Song of Ice and Fire, [A] Game of Thrones'" by George R. R. Martin	
Tritonicula khaleesi (Silva, Azevedo & Matthews-Cascon, 2014)	Sea slug	Khaleesi, title of Daenerys Targaryen	Daenerys "is described as being short and having long white hair, features that resemble the white band on the notum" of the species. Originally described as Tritonia khaleesi, and subsequently transferred to genus Tritonicula	
Pheidole drogon Sarnat, Fischer & Economo, 2016	Ant	Drogon	"The species name refers to Drogon, the black-colored dragon of Daenerys Targaryen"	
Pheidole viserion Sarnat, Fischer & Economo, 2016	Ant	Viserion	"The species name refers to Viserion, the cream and gold colored dragon of Daenerys Targaryen"	
Pseudocalotes drogon Grismer et al., 2016	Lizard	Drogon	"The specific epithet drogon refers to this species' resemblance in form and color to the dark dragon, Drogon—one of three dragons born in the Dothraki Sea and commanded by Daenerys Targaryen—the Mother of Dragons—in George R. R. Martin's fictional work Game of Thrones."	
Pseudocalotes rhaegal Grismer et al., 2016	Lizard	Rhaegal	"The specific epithet rhaegal refers to this species' resemblance in form and color to the greenish dragon, Rhaegal—one of three dragons born in the Dothraki Sea and commanded by Daenerys Targaryen—the Mother of Dragons—in George R. R. Martin's fictional work Game of Thrones."	
Pseudocalotes viserion Grismer et al., 2016	Lizard	Viserion	"The specific epithet viserion refers to this species' resemblance in form and color to the yellowish dragon, Viserion—one of three dragons born in the Dothraki Sea and commanded by Daenerys Targaryen—the Mother of Dragons—in George R. R. Martin's fictional work Game of Thrones."	
Hippasosa ghost (Jocque & Jocqué, 2017)	Spider	Ghost	"The species name 'ghost' refers to the fully white appearance of this spider. Additional reference is made to the large white direwolf 'Ghost' in Game of Thrones, the first book in the series of fantasy novels A Song of Ice and Fire by George R.R. Martin." This species was originally described as Ocyale ghost and subsequently transferred to genus Hippasosa.	
Eadya daenerys Ridenbaugh, 2018	Wasp	Daenerys Targaryen	"This species is named for Daenerys Stormborn of House Targaryen, the First of Her Name, Queen of the Andals and the First Men, Protector of the Seven Kingdoms, the Mother of Dragons, Khaleesi of the Great Grass Sea, the Unburnt, the Breaker of Chains"	
Ochyrocera varys Brescovit et al., 2018	Spider	Varys	"Lorde Varys is a character with a venomous spirit, known as a spider in the plot."	
Paramonovius nightking Li & Yeates, 2018	Bee fly	Night King	"This species is named after the Night King in the American fantasy drama Game of Thrones, because all the specimens were collected in winter and the fly is mostly covered in thick pale pruinescence." Also, the fly, like the fictional villain, turns its victims into zombies.	
Abyssarya Bonifácio & Menot, 2018	Segmented worm	Arya Stark	"This genus is dedicated to Arya Stark, one of [the lead author]'s favourite characters in the novel 'A song of ice and fire' by George R. R. Martin. The name is composed by 'abyss' from the Latin word 'ăbyssus' meaning 'bottomless' and Arya."	
Hodor hodor Bonifácio & Menot, 2018	Segmented worm	Hodor	The genus and species are "dedicated to Hodor, one of [the lead author]'s favourite characters in the novel 'A song of ice and fire' by George R. R. Martin."	
Echinoderes daenerysae Grzelak & Sørensen, 2018	Mud dragon	Daenerys Targaryen	"The species name refers to queen Daenerys Targaryen called 'Mother of Dragons', a major character in the books of George R.R. Martin."	
Echinoderes drogoni Grzelak & Sørensen, 2018	Mud dragon	Drogon	"The species name refers to the largest of Daenerys Targaryen's dragons called Drogon. He was named after her husband Khal Drogo; one of the characters in the books of George R.R. Martin."	
Echinoderes rhaegali Grzelak & Sørensen, 2018	Mud dragon	Rhaegal	"The species name refers to Rhaegal, one of the dragons commanded by Daenerys Targaryen. The dragon was named after her brother Rhaegar Targaryen, called 'The Last Dragon'; one of the characters in the books of George R.R. Martin."	
Drephalys dracarys Madruga, Siewert, O. Mielke & Dolibaina, 2018	Butterfly	"Dracarys"	"The name is High Valyrian, a fictional language created by George R. R. Martin in his novel "A Song of Ice and Fire". Dracarys means "dragon's fire" and it is a command used by Daenerys Targaryen to make their dragon's [sic] breathe fire. The name represents the color pattern on the wings of this new species."	
Fujuriphyes viserioni Sánchez, Sørensen & Landers, 2019	Mud dragon	Viserion		
Gymnetis drogoni Ratcliffe, 2019	Scarab beetle	Drogon		
Gymnetis rhaegali Ratcliffe, 2019	Scarab beetle	Rhaegal		
Gymnetis viserioni Ratcliffe, 2019	Scarab beetle	Viserion		
†Targaryendraco Pêgas, Holgado & Leal, 2019	Pterosaur	Dragons of House Targaryen	"A combination of Targaryen and draco (from the Latin word for dragon), in reference to the fictional dragons of the saga A Song of Ice and Fire that exhibit dark-coloured bones. This refers to the dark colour of the type specimen of Targaryendraco wiedenrothi comb. nov., as well as to the classic association between pterosaurs and dragons [...]. This reference also honours the fact that pterosaurs have inspired some biological aspects of the dragons featured in the novels."	
†Meraxes Canale et al., 2022	Dinosaur	Meraxes	Named after a dragon ridden by Queen Rhaenys Targaryen.	
Baratheonus Gellert, Palero & Błażewicz, 2022	Tanaid	House Baratheon		
Baratheonus roberti Gellert, Palero & Błażewicz, 2022	Tanaid	Robert Baratheon		
Starkus Gellert, Palero & Błażewicz, 2022	Tanaid	House Stark		
Lannisterella Gellert, Palero & Błażewicz, 2022	Tanaid	House Lannister		
Lannisterella cerseiae Gellert, Palero & Błażewicz, 2022	Tanaid	Cersei Lannister		
Acanthosaura syrax Trivalairat et al., 2026	Lizard	Syrax	"named in reference to the dragon "Syrax", the mount of Queen Rhaenyra Targaryen. This name is inspired by the species' distinctive yellow-hued coloration, its relatively diminutive size compared to its congeners, and its significant reproductive output, reflected in its high clutch size."	

=== Rumo and His Miraculous Adventures (2003) ===
Taxon	Type	Named for	Notes	Ref
Tetramorium rumo Hita Garcia & Fisher, 2014	Ant	Rumo	"The new species is named after the fictional character 'Rumo' from Walter Moers' fantasy novel 'Rumo and His Miraculous Adventures'. Tetramorium rumo is a very bright species, almost white, with distinct propodeal spines reminiscent of 'Rumo', who is a white wolperting with short but acute horns."	
Tetramorium rala Hita Garcia & Fisher, 2014	Ant	Rala	"The new species is named after the fictional character 'Rala' from Walter Moers' fantasy novel 'Rumo and His Miraculous Adventures'."	

=== Ready Player One (2011) ===
Taxon	Type	Named for	Notes	Ref
Strumigenys anorak Sarnat et al, 2019	Ant	Anorak	"Anorak refers to the online avatar of James Donovan Halliday, creator of the virtual reality world OASIS, in the fictional work Ready Player One"	
Strumigenys artemis Sarnat et al, 2019	Ant	Art3mis	"Artemis is the Latinized version of Art3mis, a famous gunter in the fictional work Ready Player One. Artemis is also the Greek goddess of the hunt and is an apt name for a Strumigenys species."	
Strumigenys avatar Sarnat et al, 2019	Ant	Avatar	"Avatar refers to the three-dimensional representation of OASIS users in the fictional work Ready Player One"	
Strumigenys gunter Sarnat et al, 2019	Ant	Gunter	"Gunter is a contraction of 'egg' and 'hunter' in the fictional work Ready Player One and refers to particular users of the virtual reality world OASIS."	
Strumigenys oasis Sarnat et al, 2019	Ant	OASIS	"Oasis (Ontologically Anthropocentric Sensory Immersive Simulation) refers to the virtual reality world featured in the fictional work Ready Player One"	
Strumigenys parzival Sarnat et al, 2019	Ant	Parzival	"Parzival refers to the name of the protagonist's virtual reality avatar in the fictional work Ready Player One"	

=== Other literature ===
Taxon	Type	Named for	Notes	Ref
Skierka Raciborsky (1900)	Rust	Skierka, Balladyna		
Paramphientomum yumyum Enderlein, 1907	Barklouse	Yum-Yum, The Mikado	The species is native to Japan, the setting of The Mikado.	
Grendelius McGowan, 1976	Ichthyosaur	Grendel, Beowulf	Named after "Grendel [...] a legendary creature from the Old English epic, Beowulf"	
Morlockia Garcia-Valdecasas, 1984	Crustacean	Morlocks, The Time Machine	"H. J. Wells described in 'The Time Machine' the Morlocks as inhabitants of the interior of the earth. They had lost their eyes and showed other adaptations to subterranean life."	
Platygaster imlaci Buhl, 1997	Wasp	Imlac, The History of Rasselas, Prince of Abissinia		
Agra ichabod Erwin, 2002	Ground beetle	Ichabod Crane, "The Legend of Sleepy Hollow"	"The specific epithet, ichabod [...] refers to the fact that the Holotype is missing its head and the illusion is that of the frightened Schoolteacher Ichabod Crane's phantom nemesis, the Headless Horseman, in The Legend of Sleepy Hollow [by] Washington Irving, published in 1819"	
Micropholcus evaluna (Huber, Pérez & Baptista, 2005)	Cellar spider	Eva Luna, Eva Luna and The Stories of Eva Luna	A Venezuelan species "Named for Isabel Allende's Venezuela-born protagonist and fantastic story-teller." Originally described as Leptopholcus evaluna, and subsequently transferred to Micropholcus.	
Boccacciomymar decameron Triapitsyn & Berezovskiy, 2007	Fairyfly	The Decameron		
Trurlia Jałoszyński, 2009	Rove beetle	Trurl, The Cyberiad	A genus of ant-like stone beetles from Southeast Asia, described by a Polish scientist, whose name "is derived from Trurl, a character featured by a recently deceased Polish science-fiction author and philosopher Stanisław Lem, and is named in tribute to his extraordinary imagination that populated the Universe with a plethora of fantastic live beings; Trurlia with its bizarre appearance fits well into his imaginary world."	
Calumma tarzan Gehring et al, 2010	Chameleon	Tarzan	"[W]e dedicate the new species to the fictional forest man 'Tarzan' in the hope that this famous name will promote awareness and conservation activities for this apparently highly threatened new species and its habitats, in the mid-altitude rainforest."	
Bokermannohyla sagarana Leite, Pezzuti & Drummond, 2011	Frog	Sagarana	"honors the literary work of João Guiramães Rosa [sic], a Brazilian novelist born in the 20th century. Sagarana was his first published book in which he exposed his innovative language and its themes associated to the Sertão (semiarid Brazilian backlands) life in the State of Minas Gerais, Brazil [where the specimens were collected]. Sagarana is a vocabulary made up by the author with the elements saga (common designation to prose narratives, historical or legendary, Nordic, written mainly in Iceland, in the 13th and 14th centuries), and rana (Tupi suffix that expresses similarity), meaning narratives similar to legends, sagas [...]. Sagarana is cited by its author as an example of the expressive strength of a neologism, as it is totally new, for any reader and not explained yet, virgin of sight and understanding. We appropriated the innovative features of a neologism to name the new species."	
Gogoltilla chichikovi Williams, Brothers & Pitts, 2011	Wasp	Pavel Chichikov, Dead Souls	The monotypic genus Gogoltilla, created concurrently, honors Nikolai Gogol, the author of the novel.	
Aleiodes dresdeni Butcher et al, 2012	Wasp	Harry Dresden, The Dresden Files	"Named after the wizard character, Harry Dresden, from the Jim Butcher novels."	
Auplopus charlesi Waichert & Pitts, 2012	Wasp	Nick Charles, The Thin Man	"Named in honor of Samuel Dashiell Hammett (1894–1961), who was a well-known American author of hardboiled detective novels and short stories, and creator of the famous protagonist, Nick Charles."	
Dipogon marlowei Waichert & Pitts, 2012	Wasp	Philip Marlowe	"Named in honor of Raymond Thornton Chandler (1888–1959), an American crime writer who greatly influenced the modern private eye story and created the famous protagonist, Philip Marlowe."	
Priocnessus vancei Waichert & Pitts, 2012	Wasp	Philo Vance	"Named in honor of Willard Huntington Wright (1888–1939), an American crime writer who created the fictional detective, Philo Vance."	
Inconnivus billibunteri Błażewicz-Paszkowycz & Bamber, 2012	Tanaid	Billy Bunter	This species, "much less slender" than its closest relatives, is "named after William George ("Billy") Bunter, a proportionately-fat schoolboy character in books written by Charles Hamilton using the pen-name Frank Richards."	
Oileus gasparilomi Cano & Schuster, 2012	Bess beetle	Gaspar Ilóm, Men of Maize	"Named after Gaspar Ilóm, a native hero of the novel 'Men of Maize' by Miguel Ángel Asturias. The collection locality is called 'mountains of Ilóm'."	
†Millerocaulis tekelili Vera (2012)	Fern	"Tekeli-li", The Narrative of Arthur Gordon Pym of Nantucket	"The specific epithet derives from the word Tekeli-li, pronounced by fictional Antarctic inhabitants in the book 'The Narrative of Arthur Gordon Pym of Nantucket' by Edgar [Allan] Poe and in the book 'At the [M]ountains of [M]adness' by Howard Phillips Lovecraft.	
Magelona sinbadi Mortimer, Cassà, Martin & Gil, 2012	Segmented worm	Sinbad the Sailor	"From the name Sinbad, the fictional sailor with Persian origins, referring to the region in which this species was first sampled."	
Ophryotrocha langstrumpae Wiklund et al., 2012	Polychaete worm	Pippi Longstocking, Pippi Longstocking (novel)	"Ophryotrocha langstrumpae sp. nov. has long antennae and palps resembling braids, and it is named after a famous braid-bearing girl, Pippi Longstocking, in children's books by Astrid Lindgren. In the original books in Swedish, she is called Pippi Långstrump."	
Goniomonas avonlea Kim & Archibald, 2013	Protist	Avonlea, Anne of Green Gables	"The species epithet avonlea refers to the name of a village in the novel Anne of Green Gables by Lucy Maud Montgomery. The specimen was collected from the northern shore of Prince Edward Island, where the fictional village is located."	
Simlops jamesbondi Bonaldo et al., 2014	Spider	James Bond	"The species is named after the famous fictional character James Bond because its provisory name in the PBI database, CR007, included Bond's code number (007)."	
Chimerella corleone Twomey, Delia & Castroviejo-Fisher, 2014	Glass frog	Corleone family, The Godfather	"The specific name is a patronym for the Corleone family depicted in Mario Puzo's novel The Godfather and the trilogy of films directed by Francis Ford Coppola."	
Voriax Kury, 2014	Harvestman	Lord Voriax, Majipoor series		
Hyorhinomys stuempkei Esselstyn et al., 2015	True mouse	Harald Stümpke, The Snouters: Form and Life of the Rhinogrades	"The species is named in honor of Gerolf Steiner, who used the pseudonym Harald Stümpke, to publish a small book (Bau und Leben der Rhinogradentia) commonly known in English as The Snouters (Stümpke 1967). The Snouters describes a fictional island radiation of mammals with extraordinary nasal and aural adaptations and seemingly anticipates the discovery of H. stuempkei, with its large pink nose and long pinnae."	
Phytotelmatrichis osopaddington Darby & Chaboo, 2015	Featherwing beetle	Paddington Bear	This species is endemic to Peru, and its name "honours the birthplace of Paddington Bear, the beloved children's literature character created by the UK author, Michael Bond, in 1958. Paddington was an immigrant from "darkest Peru" (Bond 1958)."	
†Pseudodictyophimus ignatius Renaudie & Lazarus, 2015	Radiolarian	Ignatius J. Reilly, A Confederacy of Dunces	This is a "Large species of Pseudodictyophimus with numerous thorns, a widely opening thorax."	
Solanum watneyi Martine & Frawley	Bush tomato	Mark Watney, The Martian	"The specific epithet of "watneyi" is inspired by the book and film, The Martian, in which the protagonist finds himself stranded on Mars surrounded by the planet's harsh terrain and reddish soils. In a shelter, he manages to grow a crop of potatoes (Solanum tuberosum) before finally being rescued by his astronaut colleagues. We've chosen to name Solanum watneyi after this character, Mark Watney, in part because of the similarly reddish soils of its habitat and the congeneric nature of the potato – but, most notably, as a way to honor the creation of a sci-fi hero botanist by author Andy Weir and to acknowledge perhaps the finest paean to botanical science (and botanical field work) that Hollywood has yet presented."	
†Aquilonifer Briggs et al., 2016	Arthropod	The Kite Runner	"The name of the new taxon refers to the fancied resemblance between the tethered individuals and kites, and echoes the title of the 2003 novel The Kite Runner by Khaled Hosseini (aquila, eagle or kite; -fer, suffix meaning carry; thus aquilonifer, kite bearer)"	
Epimeria cinderella d'Udekem d'Acoz & Verheye, 2017	Amphipod	Cinderella	"Cinderella, heroin of humble origin in a well-known folk tale. The name [...] alludes to the modest size and the absence of ornamentation of the species, which contrasts with the extravagant adornment and the impressive size of many 'rival' Epimeria species."	
Meoneura goldemari Stuke & Freidberg, 2017	Fly	King Goldemar, Goldemar	A tiny fly (length<2 mm) "named after King Goldemar, a dwarf who imprisoned the maid Hertlin, who later became the wife of the gothic King Dietrich von Bern. The story was told in the poem by Albrecht von Kemenaten."	
Meoneura nilsholgerssoni Stuke & Freidberg, 2017	Fly	Nils Holgersson, The Wonderful Adventures of Nils	A tiny fly (length=2.4 mm) "dedicated to Nils Holgersson, the main character of The Wonderful Adventures of Nils by Selma Lagerlöf. Nils was enchanted, shrunk to the gnome size and travelled with wild geese across Sweden."	
Meoneura oskari Stuke & Freidberg, 2017	Fly	Oskar Matzerath, The Tin Drum	A tiny fly (length=2.3 mm) "named after Oskar Matzerath from the novel The Tin Drum (Die Blechtrommel) by Günter Grass. Born with the adult's level of spiritual development, Oskar decided at his third birthday never to grow up and stayed little for his whole life."	
Myrmecium oompaloompa Candiani & Bonaldo, 2017	Spider	Oompa-Loompas, Charlie and the Chocolate Factory	"This species is named after the Oompa Loompas, fictional characters from the motion picture Charlie and the Chocolate Factory [despite the reference to the film, they were literary characters first]. They are workers in Willie Wonka's [sic] factory and are paid solely with their preferred food, cocoa. The name refers to the fact that most specimens were collected in cocoa plantations in southern Bahia."	
Ochyrocera charlotte Brescovit et al., 2018	Spider	Charlotte, Charlotte's Web	"The specific name refers to Charlotte, the spider from the classic 'Charlotte's Web' by E.B. White and a great friend of the pig named Wilbur."	
Ochyrocera misspider Brescovit et al, 2018	Spider	Little Miss Spider	"The specific name refers to Little Miss Spider, a very popular spider around the world and the main character of the children's books by David Kirk."	
†Buratina truncata Khramov, 2019	Spongefly	Buratino	"Genus named after Buratina, a long-nosed character of the science fiction novel by Michael Kharitonov."	
Meoneura mucki Stuke & Barták, 2019	Fly	Little Muck (German fairy tale)	"The "Kleine Muck" is a participant of Wilhelm Hauff's fairy tale "Die Karavane". The Kleine Muck is a small misshapen figure and outsider as Carnidae are small inconspicuous Diptera which hardly anybody is interested in."	
Mischocyttarus kallindusfloren Borges & Silveira, 2019	Wasp	Kalinda, Neverness	"The specific epithet is a reference made to the computational goddess Kalinda of the flowers, created by the mathematician David Zindell in his book Neverness."	
Samadinia despereaux (Lee, Richer de Forges & Ng, 2019)	Crab	Despereaux Tilling, The Tale of Despereaux	"The species is named after the fictional mouse character, Despereaux Tilling (The Tale of Despereaux), of whose big ears the new species' ear-like hepatic lobes reminded the present authors." Originally described as Rochinia despereaux and subsequently transferred to genus Samadinia.	
Tegenaria shirin Zamani & Marusik, 2019	Spider	Shirin, Khosrow and Shirin	A funnel weaver spider from Iran, whose name "refers to the main female character of Khosrow and Shirin, a famous Persian tragic romance by the poet Nizami Ganjavi (1141–1209)."	
Caridina shahrazadae Klotz, Rintelen & Christodoulou, 2019	Shrimp	Scheherazade, One Thousand and One Nights	A freshwater species from Iran, "named after Shahrazad, the character that portraits the storyteller in the book One Thousand and One Nights."	
†Malthodes nublar Kupryjanowicz & Fanti, 2019	Beetle	Isla Nublar, Jurassic Park (novel) and Jurassic Park (film)	A fossil soldier beetle found in Eocene Baltic amber.	
Frenopyxis stierlitzi Bobrov & Mazei, 2020	Amoebozoan	Stierlitz	"The species is named after Max Otto von Stierlitz one of the lead character in a popular Russian book series written in the 1960s by novelist Yulian Semyonov and of the television adaptation Seventeen Moments of Spring, directed by Tatyana Lioznova and starring by Vyacheslav Tikhonov. [...] Stierlitz lived in Babelsberg (Potsdam, Germany) where one of the populations of the new species was discovered. Moreover, this name underlines [the] hidden nature of the habitat (viz. tree hollows), where [the] new species was discovered."	
Coptoborus katniss Smith & Cognato, 2021	Bark beetle	Katniss Everdeen, The Hunger Games	"The apex of the elytra declivity of this species is shaped like an arrowhead, Katniss' weapon of choice."	
Pseudotanais rapunzelae Błażewicz, Jakiel, Bamber & Bird, 2021	Tanaid	Rapunzel	"Rapunzel is a princess in a Brothers Grimm fairy tale who, imprisoned in a high tower, offered to let down her long hair so that her lover could climb up to her. This alludes to the unusually long dorsodistal seta on pereopods 5 and 6."	
†Gallirallus astolfoi Salvador, Anderson & Tennyson, 2021	Rail	Astolfo	An extinct flightless rail from the island of Rapa Iti, French Polynesia; "The specific epithet honours Astolfo, one of Charlemagne's fictional paladins. In the epic Orlando Furioso, Astolfo becomes trapped on a remote island because of the sorceress Alcina."	
Eucampesmella brascubas Bouzan, Iniesta, Pena-Barbosa & Brescovit, 2021	Millipede	Brás Cubas, The Posthumous Memoirs of Brás Cubas	A species from Brazil named as "a reference to the Brazilian literature character "Brás Cubas" from the book "Memórias Póstumas de Brás Cubas" written by Machado de Assis."	
Eucampesmella capitu Bouzan, Iniesta, Pena-Barbosa & Brescovit, 2021	Millipede	Capitu, Dom Casmurro	A species from Brazil named as "a reference to the Brazilian literature character "Capitu" from the book "Dom Casmurro" written by Machado de Assis."	
Eucampesmella iracema Bouzan, Iniesta, Pena-Barbosa & Brescovit, 2021	Millipede	Iracema, Iracema	A species from Brazil named as "a reference to the Brazilian literature character "Iracema" from the book "Iracema" written by José de Alencar."	
Caramuruacarus Bassini-Silva & Jacinavicius, 2022	Chigger	Caramuru	A genus native to Brazil, "named in honour of the epic poem Caramuru that exalts Brazilian lands, combined with the word 'acarus', which means 'mite' in Latin."	
Bothrostoma kovalyovi Mández-Sánchez et al., 2022	Protist	Major Kovalyov, The Nose (Gogol short story)	"refers to Major Kovalyov, the protagonist of Gogol's short story "The Nose", who one day wakes up without his nose". Other species in this genus have an anterior proboscis or snout, but it is absent in this one.	
Metagonia zatoichi Huber, 2022	Spider	Zatoichi		
Helicina marfisae Salvador, Silva & Bichuette, 2023	Land snail	Marfisa	"After Marfisa, a fictional character in the epics Orlando Innamorato and Orlando Furioso. Marfisa was the Queen of India and one of the fiercest warriors on the land, often compared to a lioness. The name is an allusion to the name of the type locality [Gruta do Leão, Bahia state, Brazil], which translates to Cave of the Lion."	
Axoniderma wanda Ekins & Hooper, 2023	Sponge	Wanderer/Wanda, The Host (novel) and The Host (2013 film)	"This species is named for its resemblance to the alien wanderer/wanda that parasitizes the host Melanie Stryder, played by actress Saoirse Ronan from the movie and novel by the same name i.e. "the Host", authored by Stephenie Meyer."	
Peltocephalus maturin Ferreira et al., 2024	Turtle	Maturin, The Dark Tower	"Maturin refers to the giant turtle that vomited out the universe in Stephen King's stories, which in turn was inspired by the character Stephen Maturin who, in the book H.M.S. Surprise of Patrick O'Brian's Aubrey–Maturin series, names a giant tortoise."	
Ceroptres lupini Nastasi, Smith & Davis, 2024	Wasp	Arsène Lupin	"Named for Arsène Lupin, a fictional thief initially appearing in early-1900s French serials written by Maurice Leblanc."	
Chrysolina tortilla Bieńkowski, 2024	Leaf Beetle	Tortila the Turtle, The Golden Key, or The Adventures of Buratino	"The new species is named "tortilla" [...] due to its unusually wide body, like a turtle. "Tortilla" is the personal name of a turtle from a fairy tale "The Golden Key" by the Russian writer A.N. Tolstoy."	
Goncharovtilla oblomovi Williams, Bartholomay & Lopez, 2024	Velvet ant	Ilya Ilyich Oblomov, Oblomov	"Named after the fictional character Ilya Ilyich Oblomov, the particularly lazy main character of the novel Oblomov by Ivan Goncharov [after whom the genus is named]. The first recorded specimen was collected in Russas, Ceará in 2010 and was almost immediately recognized by KAW [the lead author] as a new species. [...] It took 50 pages for Oblomov to even rise from his bed, and it has taken 14 years for KAW to get around to naming and describing this spectacular wasp."	
Entoloma daegae Rodrigues, Vila-Viçosa & Fachada (2025)	Fungus	João da Ega, Os Maias	"Named after João da Ega, iconic character from the novel Os Maias by Eça de Queirós. Known for his sharp wit and unorthodox ideas; originating from the type locality."	

== Comics ==
=== The Adventures of Tintin (1929–1986) ===
Taxon	Type	Named for	Notes	Ref
Scelio dupondi Yoder, 2014	Wasp	Dupont and Dupond, original French names of Thomson and Thompson	Named for the close similarity of the sister species, just as the "two [twins] were always being confused with one another"	
Scelio janseni Yoder, 2014	Wasp	Jansen and Janssen, translated Dutch names of Thomson and Thompson	Named for the close similarity of the sister species, just as the "two [twins] were always being confused with one another"	
Chaleponcus tintin Enghoff, 2014	Millipede	Tintin	The specific epithet "refers to a cartoon character developed by the Belgian author Hergé because of the (somewhat remote) resemblance of the shape of the gonopod cucullus to Tintin's hairstyle."	
Neralsia haddocki van Noort, Buffington & Forshage, 2014	Wasp	Captain Haddock	"The specific epithet [...] is for Captain Haddock, the comic book character by Hergé. The derivation has specific reference to Captain Haddock's consistent state of inebriation and utterance of the phrases "ten thousand thundering typhoons" and "billions of bilious blue blistering barnacles", expletives commiserate with the discovery and generic determination of this novel Afrotropical record in the CAR ethanol samples."	
Xyalophora tintini van Noort, Buffington & Forshage, 2014	Wasp	Tintin	"The specific epithet [...] is for Tintin, the comic book character by Hergé, whose adventures in the Congo [where this species is found] have done much to popularise the country in a very controversial manner in parts of the world. The Xyalophora spine may possibly suggest Tintin's famous tuft of hair."	
†Allonnia tintinopsis Bengtson & Collins, 2015	Chancelloriid	Tintin	"From Tintin, the comic-book hero of Hergé (Georges Remi), and Greek -opsis, like, alluding to the pronounced apical tuft of this species."	

=== Popeye (1929–present) ===
Taxon	Type	Named for	Notes	Ref
†Teruzzicheles popeyei (Teruzzi, 1990)	Polychelid lobster	Popeye	A fossil from the Jurassic of Italy, originally named Coleia popeyei but subsequently reclassified in its own monotypic genus (named after its discoverer). "dedicated to Popeye, a character of the cartoonist E. C. Segar. We have always called "Braccio di ferro" (the italian name of Popeye) specimens of this species because of the strong propodus, recalling Popeye's arm muscles"	
Campsicnemus popeye Evenhuis, 2013	Fly	Popeye	"The specific name derives from the American cartoon character 'Popeye the Sailor Man', who had swollen forearms; and refers to the swollen mid tibia of the males"	
Voriax popeye Kury, 2014	Harvestman	Popeye	"Popeye the sailor is a cartoon ﬁctional character created by Elzie Crisler Segar, and whose most distinctive feature are his massive forearms." (similar to the femurs of this species)	
Cephennodes popeye Jałoszyński, 2017	Beetle	Popeye	"named after the cartoon character Popeye the Sailor, in reference to the enlarged protibiae resembling Popeye's massive forearms."	
Masona popeye Quicke & Chaul, 2019	Wasp	Popeye	"Name refers to the fictional cartoon character 'Popeye the sailorman', created by Elzie Crisler Segar, who had extremely swollen, muscular, fore arms." (similar to the femurs of this insect)	
Spelaeochernes popeye Schimonsky & Bichuette, 2019	Pseudoscorpion	Popeye	"The specific epithet refers to the classic Popeye comic character, created by Elzie Crisler Segar in 1929, due to the size of the male chela, which is enhanced like the muscles of the character."	
Aenictus popeyei Gómez, 2022	Ant	Popeye	"named after the cartoon character Popeye. It can't be denied that mandibles do look alike."	
Apotropina popeye Ang, 2023	Fly	Popeye	"The specific epithet popeye refers to the comically enlarged hind tibia, which in combination with the comparatively thin femur, resembles the distinctive arms and legs of the spinach-powered cartoon character "Popeye the Sailor"."	

=== DC Comics (1935–present) ===
Taxon	Type	Named for	Notes	Ref
Otocinclus batmani Lehmann A., 2006	Catfish	Batman	Named for having a "bat-shaped vertical spot on [its] caudal-fin"	
Euragallia batmani Rodrigues, Goncalves & Mejdalani, 2012	Leafhopper	Batman	"The specific epithet, batmani, is a reference to the dorsal region of the aedeagal base in dorsal view, which closely resembles the open wings of a bat, like those of the Batman symbol."	
†Kalelia Pérez & del Río, 2017	Clam	Kal-El, the Kryptonian name of Superman		
Trissolcus nycteridaner Talamas, 2017	Wasp	Batman	"Like Batman, species of Trissolcus are dark in color, rarely seen by the public, kill bad guys (stink bugs) for the benefit of humankind, and are at times unfairly vilified on the basis of their name (parasitic wasp). The epithet derives from the Greek words 'nycteris,' meaning 'bat', and 'aner,' meaning 'man'"	
Anthracites furvuseques Tan, Baroga-Barbecho & Yap, 2018	Katydid	Batman	"The species name refers to the Dark Knight (in Latin; dark = furvus, knight = eques). This species is named after the fictional superhero character Batman in the Dark Knight Trilogy directed by Christopher Nolan. The species' black colouration resembles the dark suit of the vigilante while the titillators also shows certain resemblance to the iconic Batman mask and logo in the film."	
Biconcavus batmani Figuerola, Gordon & Cristobo, 2018	Bryozoan	Batman	"Alluding to 'Batman', a fictional superhero of comic books and movies, alluding to the distal oral rim bearing lateral stout tubercles which resemble a Batman mask."	
†Kariridraco dianae Cerqueira et al., 2021	Pterosaur	Diana Prince, the civilian identity of Wonder Woman		
Agamopus joker Costa-Silva & Carvalho & Vaz-De, 2022	Scarab beetle	The Joker	"The specific name 'joker' [...] is an eponym after the homonymous supervillain from the DC Comics Universe. It is a reference to the sinuous pygidial sulcus of this species, which resembles the shape of a smiley clown's mouth."	
Epicratinus arlequina Gonçalves & Brescovit, 2024	Ant spider	Harley Quinn	A species from Brazil, named "in reference to Harley Quinn (Arlequina in Portuguese), a fictional character appearing in American comic books published by DC Comics. Harley Quinn often uses a baseball bat as a weapon that resembles the shape of his atrium."	
Ceroptres selinae Nastasi, Smith & Davis, 2024	Wasp	Selina Kyle, a.k.a. Catwoman	"Named for Selina Kyle, a character from the DC Comics franchise perhaps more commonly known by the moniker Catwoman. She is famously known as a trickster, especially within the context of her tumultuous relationship with the infamous Batman."	
Laftrachia robin Porto, Derkarabetian, Giribet & Pérez-González, 2024	Harvestman	Robin	"The species name, a noun in apposition, is a reference to the DC comics character "Robin" [...] The black pigmentation in the eye region of the species is similar to the mask used by the character in his appearances."	
†Grana harveydenti Viertler, Schwarz, Verheyde & Klopfstein, 2024	Wasp	Harvey Dent, a.k.a. Two-Face	A fossil species found in Baltic amber, "Named after the fictional supervillain Harvey Dent (also called Two-Face), from the DC-Comic Batman. Like this character, this specimen has one side of its body destroyed, while the other side is intact."	
Alpaida batman Baptista, Castanheira & Schinelli, 2025	Spider	Batman	"The species epithet of the new species refers to the DC Comics hero Batman created by Bob Kane and Bill Finger, because the dark patches on the posterior half on the ventral side of the abdomen of both males and females resemble a small bat and are somewhat similar to the bat sign appearing in some old comics."	

=== Marvel Comics (1939–present) ===
Taxon	Type	Named for	Notes	Ref
Ogdoconta satana Metzler, Knudson & Poole, 2013	Moth	Satana	"The scientific name satana comes from the Marvel comic book fictional character Satana, a child of Satan and sinister character, who taught black magic. The name refers to the black (often equated with evil) color of the adult moth."	
†Allodaposuchus hulki Blanco et al., 2015	Crocodylomorph	Hulk	A fossil primitive crocodile from the Cretaceous of Spain, whose name comes "from the character of Marvel, Hulk; due to the strong muscle attachments of the bones."	
Bromeloecia wolverinei Yau & Marshall, 2018	Fly	Wolverine	"This species is named for the group of 3 heavily sclerotized, flattened setae on the ventral surface of the surstylus, which closely resembles the claws and fist of the comic book character 'Wolverine'."	
Otiothops doctorstrange Cala-Riquelme et al, 2018	Spider	Doctor Strange	"The specific epithet is a noun in apposition referring to the Marvel comics 'Doctor Strange' created by artist Steve Ditko and writer Stan Lee in 1963."	
†Thanos simonattoi Delcourt & Iori, 2018	Theropod dinosaur	Thanos	"Genus name from the Greek thánato, meaning death and from the Marvel's [sic] character Thanos, the Conquer, created by Jim Starlin"	
Cirrhilabrus wakanda Tea, et al., 2019	Wrasse	Wakanda	It was given the common name "Vibranium fairy wrasse" as the "purple chain-link scale pattern of the new species is reminiscent of" the fictional metal Vibranium.	
Discothyrea wakanda Hita Garcia & Lieberman, 2019	Ant	Wakanda	"The new species is endemic to the Rwenzori Mountains in the Albertine Rift, the location of Wakanda in the Black Panther comics. Wakanda is a peaceful, prosperous country which was never colonized, where ancient cultural traditions coexist with conservation of natural resources and high-technology modernity. Discothyrea wakanda is named in honor of these ideals for Africa and the world."	
Miroculis wolverine Costa & Almeida & Salles, 2019	Mayfly	Wolverine	"The specific epithet alludes to Marvel Comics character Wolverine, as the penis of the new species resembles the retractable adamantium claw that emerge from the back of the superhero's hand"	
Daptolestes bronteflavus Robinson & Yeates, 2020	Robber fly	Thor	The specific name means "blonde thunder" and was given the common name "Thor's fly."	
Daptolestes illusiolautus Robinson & Yeates, 2020	Robber fly	Loki	The specific name means "elegant deception" and was given the common name "Loki's fly."	
Daptolestes feminategus Robinson & Yeates, 2020	Robber fly	Black Widow	The specific name means "woman wearing leather" and was given the common name "Black Widow's fly."	
Humorolethalis Robinson & Yeates, 2020	Robber fly	Deadpool	The newly erected genus means "wet or moist and dead" and its sole member, Humorolethalis sergius, was given the common name "Deadpool's fly" for sharing similar markings to Deadpool's mask.	
Habeastrum strangei Simone & Cavallari & Salvador, 2020	Snail	Doctor Strange	"The specific epithet is given in honor of Dr. Stephen V. Strange, a fictional character from Marvel Comics. Besides being an acknowledgement of one of the greatest Marvel characters, the name also alludes to the weirdness of this dextral diplommatinid species."	
Hopliancistrus wolverine Oliveira, Zuanon, Rapp Py-Daniel, Birindelli & Sousa, 2021	Catfish	Wolverine	"This species has strong lateral curved spikes called odontodes tucked under the gill covers that can be extended to jab anything that tries to mess with them." The species is named for Wolverine, who has retractable, extendable claws.	
Gekko hulk Grismer et al., 2022	Gekko	Hulk	Named for sharing the characteristics of "great physical strength and a very aggressive temperament"	
Voconia loki Castillo & Rédei & Weirauch, 2022	True bug	Loki	"Named after the cunning trickster from Norse mythology and from the Marvel Comics' character, Loki, since this specimen deceived and tricked authors in a previous study (Hwang & Weirauch 2012) who misidentified it as 'Kayanocoris wegneri'."	
Tanyostea wolverini Lapointe & Watling, 2022	Coral	Wolverine	"The species is named in honor of Wolverine, a Marvel Comics superhero. The long, sharp sclerites protruding between the tentacles bases on the abaxial side of the polyp superficially resemble Wolverine’s bladed claws."	
Venomius Rossi, Castanheira, Baptista & Framenau, 2023	Orb-weaver spider	Venom	"This genus-group name is a reference to the head of the character Venom, with conspicuous black spots, that resembles the abdomen of our species, specifically the male holotype." The only species in the genus, Venomius tomhardyi, is named after Tom Hardy, who plays Venom in the eponymous films.	
Samadinia hela Davie & Lee, 2023	Crab	Hela	"The flattened hepatic and branchial plates are reminiscient of the crown of flattened horns depicted on the fictional Marvel comic-book and film character Hela, the Asgardian goddess of death (in turn derived from Hel, a character in Norse mythology)."	
Urostephanus lokii Gonz.-Martínez, Lozada-Pérez & L.O.Alvarado	Milkvine	Loki	"The specific epithet refers to the interstaminal corona that resembles the horns of the helmet used in the fictional representation in the Marvel Cinematic Universe, created by Stan Lee, of the mythical character Loki." Originally named Matelea lokii and subsequently transferred to genus Urostephanus.	
Montichneumon immortalibestia Chen & Kikuchi, 2025	Wasp	Wolverine	"The specific name immortalibestia is derived from the Latin words immortali- ('immortal') plus bestia ('beast'), meaning 'the undying beast'. The name refers to the superhero character 'Wolverine' from the Marvel Comics series 'X-Men', who has the abilities of regeneration and beast-like retractable metal claws, as the yellow and black color pattern of this species resembles the costume of this character."	

=== Peanuts (1950-2000) ===
Taxon	Type	Named for	Notes	Ref
Lepidopa luciae Boyko, 2002	Crab	Lucy Van Pelt	"The specific name 'luciae' is given after the 'Peanuts' character Lucy Van Pelt, as suggested by Jean Schulz, in recognition of Lucy's supremely 'crabby' attitude"	
Mexicope sushara Bruce, 2004	Isopod	Pig-Pen	"The epithet combines the Latin words sus (pig) and hara (pen, coop or sty) and alludes to the ability of these preserved specimens to collect adherent detritus; referring to the character 'Pigpen' in the famous comic strip Peanuts, who gathered dirt no matter what."	
Ceratocorema woodstocki Liang & Hsu, 2017	Moth	Woodstock	"Stripe patterns of adult body resemble the fictional character 'Woodstock' in Charles M. Schulz's comic strip of 'Peanuts'."	

=== The Smurfs (1958–present) ===
Taxon	Type	Named for	Notes	Ref
Agra smurf Erwin, 2000	Ground beetle	The Smurfs	"The specific epithet, smurf, is just for fun in that the weird head shape of this species reminded me of the Saturday-morning television cartoon characters of that name."	
Barrufeta N.Sampedro & S.Fraga, 2011	Dinoflagellate	The Smurfs	A species of phytoplankton described from the Costa Brava in Catalonia, Spain; "Named after the shape of the epicone, which is due to the shape of the apical groove. It is similar to the cap of a "Smurf" (originally a "Schtroumpf"), a comic strip character invented by Peyo in 1958 and adapted later to television. In Catalan, barrufet means "Smurf," with barrufeta as the feminine form".	
†Carditella pitufina Pérez, 2019	Bivalve	The Smurfs	A fossil clam from the Pliocene of Argentina; "The specific epithet refers to the Belgian comic characters created by Peyo, "Les Schtroumpfs" (called "The Smurfs" in English and "Los Pitufos" in Spanish speaker countries). These creatures are characterized by their tiny sizes as the condylocardiids bivalves. This epithet is expressed in Spanish diminutive form to emphasize the reference."	

=== Asterix (1959–present) ===
Taxon	Type	Named for	Notes	Ref
Stichoplastoris asterix (Valerio, 1980)	Tarantula	Asterix		
Stichoplastoris obelix (Valerio, 1980)	Tarantula	Obelix		
†Abraracourcix Stroiński & Szwedo, 2011	Planthopper	Vitalstatistix (Abraracourcix in the original French)	A fossil genus found in Eocene Oise amber, in Northern France.	
†Ordralfabetix Szwedo & Jacek, 2011	Planthopper	Unhygienix (Ordralfabétix in the original French)	A fossil genus found in Eocene Oise amber, in Northern France.	
Nemesia asterix Decae & Huber, 2017	Trapdoor spider	Asterix	"The trivial name asterix is derived from the Greek asteriskos meaning 'small star' and refers to the size and shape of the trapdoor that the species constructs. The spelling of the name is taken from the name of the fictional hero and star in the French comic book Asterix le Gaul 1959, by R. Goscinny & A. Uderzo."	
†Bela falbalae Ceulemans, Van Dingenen & Landau, 2018	Sea snail	Panacea (Falbala in the original French)	A fossil species from the Pliocene of western France, with a slender high spired shell, "Named after Falbala, the beautiful, tall, slender girl in the 'Asterix' comics."	
†Ondina asterixi Ceulemans, Van Dingenen & Landau, 2018	Sea snail	Asterix	A fossil species from the Pliocene of western France, "Named after the heroic comic character Asterix, [...] the valiant Gaul who resisted Julius Caesar from an unnamed village set not far from the study area."	
†Payraudeautia obelixi Landau, Ceulemans & Van Dingenen, 2018	Sea snail	Obelix	A fossil species from the Miocene of western France, "Named after the heroic comic character Obelix, [...] the valiant Gaul who resisted Julius Caesar from an unnamed village set not far from the study area. Obelix is a rotund character, reminiscent of the shape of this new species."	
Trigonopterus asterix Riedel, 2019	Weevil	Asterix		
Trigonopterus idefix Riedel, 2019	Weevil	Dogmatix (Idéfix in the original French)		
Trigonopterus obelix Riedel, 2019	Weevil	Obelix		
Kochosa asterix Framenau, Castanheira & Yoo, 2023	Wolf spider	Asterix	"The specific epithet honours Astèrix, the bravest and smartest of all Gaul warriors and best friend of Obelix, both fictional characters created by the late René Goscinny and the late Albert Uderzo"	
Kochosa obelix Framenau, Castanheira & Yoo, 2023	Wolf spider	Obelix	"The specific epithet is a patronym honouring Obelix, best friend of Astèrix and menhir delivery man"	
†Obelignathus Czepiński & Madzia, 2025	Dinosaur	Obelix	A rhabdodontomorph genus from the Cretaceous of France, whose name is "A combination of Obélix, the name of a cartoon character in the French comic book series Asterix, or Asterix and Obelix, by René Goscinny and Albert Uderzo, known for his exceptional strength, as a reference to the unusually robustly-built holotype dentary; and "gnáthos" ("γνάθος"), Greek for "jaw"."	

=== Monica and Friends (1959–present) ===
Taxon	Type	Named for	Notes	Ref
Ochyrocera dorinha Brescovit et al., 2021	Spider	Doreen/Dorinha	"Noun in apposition is a tribute to the fictional character of the Brazilian "Turma da Mônica" comic books by Maurício de Sousa. Dorinha, created in 2004, is a visually impaired character, in this case blind." This species has no eyes.	
Ochyrocera magali Brescovit et al., 2021	Spider	Maggy/Magali	"Noun in apposition is a tribute to the fictional character of the Brazilian "Turma de Mônica" comic books by Maurício de Sousa, based on his daughter Magali. She is 7 years old and her main characteristic is her voracious appetite."	
Ochyrocera monica Brescovit et al., 2021	Spider	Monica	"Noun in apposition is a tribute to the fictional character of the Brazilian 'Turma da Mônica' comic books by Maurício de Sousa."	
Ochyrocera rosinha Brescovit et al., 2021	Spider	Rosinha	"Noun in apposition is a tribute to the fictional character of the Brazilian "Turma da Mônica" comic books by Maurício de Sousa. She is a country girl, who is always wearing a red dress and a pair of pigtails in her hair."	

=== Calvin and Hobbes (1985–1995) ===
Taxon	Type	Named for	Notes	Ref
Zagrammosoma hobbesi LaSalle, 1989	Wasp	Hobbes	"Named after the tiger 'Hobbes' from the Calvin & Hobbes comic, as this species has yellow and black stripes on the face, similar to a tiger."	
Zagrammosoma calvini Perry, 2021	Wasp	Calvin	"The characteristic number of setae present on the head and body of Z. calvini is reminiscent of Calvin's spiked hair."	

=== JoJo's Bizarre Adventure (1987–present) ===
Taxon	Type	Named for	Notes	Ref
Neostygarctus lovedeluxe Fujimoto & Miyazaki, 2013	Tardigrade	Love Deluxe	"The specific epithet, lovedeluxe, refers to 'Love Deluxe', the name of a supernatural power enabling one to have complete control over one's hair, which appeared in JoJo's Bizarre Adventure Part 4: Diamond Is Unbreakable, a famous Japanese manga written and illustrated by Hirohiko Araki. The hairy appearance of the new species appears as if affected by the power of 'Love Deluxe'."	
Funny valentine Lin & Li, 2022	Spider	Funny Valentine	This species was named after Funny Valentine, the primary antagonist of the seventh part of JoJo's Bizarre Adventure, Steel Ball Run.	
Gyro zeppeli Lin & Li, 2024	Spider	Gyro Zeppeli	This species was named after Gyro Zeppeli, one of the main protagonists of the seventh part of JoJo's Bizarre Adventure, Steel Ball Run.	
Troglocoelotes doul Lin & Li, 2024	Spider	N'Doul	"The species is named after N'Doul, a character in the third part of JoJo's Bizarre Adventure, Stardust Crusaders"	

=== One Piece (1997–present) ===
Taxon	Type	Named for	Notes	Ref
Bathylepeta wadatsumi Chen, Tsuda & Ishitani, 2025	Limpet	Wadatsumi	"From 'Wadatsumi', god of the sea in Japanese mythology, alluding to its very deep habitat. It is also a reference to the fish-man character "Large Monk" Wadatsumi from Eiichiro Oda's manga series "ONE PIECE" [...], whose enormous body size is reminiscent of the large size that B. wadatsumi sp. nov. reaches for a deep-water patellogastropod."	
Damarchus inazuma Kunsete & Warrit, 2025	Spider	Inazuma	"The species is named after Inazuma, a character from the Japanese manga 'One Piece', known for the ability to change sex between male and female. The Inazuma style is characterized by bilateral asymmetry, presenting distinct coloration with orange on the left side and white on the right side. This color arrangement closely mirrors the sexual dimorphism observed in this species, with males exhibiting white coloration and females displaying orange."	
Luffy Hu & Solodovnikov, 2026	Rove beetle	Monkey D. Luffy	"The generic name Luffy is the given name of the main character of the famous manga “One Piece”, Monkey D. Luffy, who has the ability to extend his body parts. It refers to the elongated antennae, palps, and mandibles of the new genus. The gender is masculine."	
Luffy nika Hu & Solodovnikov, 2026	Rove beetle	Monkey D. Luffy	"The specific epithet nika is derived from the Devil Fruit of the main character, Luffy, in the famous manga One Piece, in reference to the genus name. It also alludes to the pale hairs of the new species, reminiscent of Luffy’s “Nika” form, in which his clothing and hair turn white."	

=== Other comics ===
Taxon	Type	Named for	Notes	Ref
†Ninjemys oweni Gaffney, 1992	Turtle	Teenage Mutant Ninja Turtles	"Ninja, in allusion to that totally rad, fearsome foursome epitomizing shelled success; emys, turtle."	
Sporopodiopsis mortimeriana Sérus. (1997)	Lichen	Professor Philip Mortimer, Blake and Mortimer	This New Guinean species, described by a Belgian scientist, "is named after Prof. Mortimer, the hero of the comic strip series of E. P. Jacobs known as "Black & Mortimer" [sic]; indeed, its campylidia, when observed fullface, look like the police robots that appear in the story "Le piège diabolique"."	
Mekon Bamber & Boxshall, 2006	Tanaid	The Mekon, Dan Dare comics	"Named after the fictitious alien in the comic strip "Dan Dare", who also had a surprisingly large, round head"	
Hypocaccus kidpaddlei Gomy, 2007	Clown beetle	Kid Paddle	The beetle resembles the "blorks", fictional aliens from the Kid Paddle comic	
Lurchibates Goldschmidt & Fu, 2011	Water mite	Lurchi	A subgenus of Hygrobates, named after "Lurchi – the main character of a famous children comic representing a salamander". Members of this subgenus are parasites of newts and salamanders.	
Euathlus condorito Perafán & Pérez-Miles, 2014	Tarantula	Condorito	A Chilean species whose name is "inspired by the main character of the most popular Chilean comic book of the same name, and one of the most acclaimed comics in Hispanoamerica [sic]. Condorito represents a man–condor, emblematic bird of the Andeans and Chile's national symbol, created in 1949 by Chilean cartoonist 'Pepo'."	
Taito kakera Kury & Barros, 2014	Harvestman	Kakera, Inuyasha	"From Japanese kakera = shard, because of the shape of the equuleus, reminiscent of the fragments of the Jewel of Four Souls in the Japanese manga 'InuYasha, a Feudal Fairy Tale', written and illustrated by Rumiko Takahashi."	
Nausicaamantis miyazakii Mériguet, 2018	Mantis	Nausicaä, Nausicaä of the Valley of the Wind	The genus Nausicaamantis "is dedicated to the manga Nausicaä of the Valley of the Wind (Kaze no tani no Naushika) by Hayao Miyazaki, published between 1982 and 1995 [...] In this ecological fable, the heroine, Nausicaä, a naturalist and benevolent character, explores the relationship between humans and a hostile nature in a universe where humanity is in its twilight. Insects play a central role." The species "is dedicated to the creator of the work Nausicaä of the Valley of the Wind, Hayao Miyazaki. The author, sensitive to our environment, places nature at the centre of several of his works." This species was described from a single specimen collected in Madagascar in 1906 (112 years before publication) and preserved in the National Museum of Natural History, France; its current conservation status is unknown and it may be extinct.	
Meoneura joedaltoni Stuke & Barták, 2019	Fly	Joe Dalton, Lucky Luke	"The species is named after Joe Dalton, the smallest of the four Dalton brothers, who appear in the Lucky Luke comic book series of Maurice de Bevere (Morris) and René Goscinny. Joe is the smallest of the four Dalton brothers as Meoneura joedaltoni is one of the smallest Acalyptratae."	
Cigaritis syama lamuae Hsu & Liang, 2020	Butterfly	Lamu, Urusei Yatsura	"The subspecific name lamuae refers to a comic character Lam (Lamu) created by a famous manga artist Rumiko Takahashi. The patterns of wing undersides recall the graphic design of the bikini Lam wears."	
Chiasmocleis jacki Fouquet, Rodrigues & Peloso, 2022	Frog	Jack Dalton, Lucky Luke	"The specific epithet [...] refers to Jack Dalton, the second tallest brother of the Dalton gang, the outlaw characters of Morris and Goscinny comic books Lucky Luke, reminding the different in size of the four species of Chiasmocleis co-occurring in the Guiana Shield, the new species being intermediary in body size."	
Larnaca lieyongzhou Shen & Yin, 2022	Raspy Cricket	Kaiou Retsu (Lie Yongzhou), Baki the Grappler	Described from Guangxi, China. The species is named after the Chinese name of Kaiou Retsu, a major character in the manga series Baki. The original description highlights his exceptional martial arts skills, kind personality, and sense of justice, which have made him widely admired by readers.	
Lathrobium guts Senda 2022	Rove beetle	Guts, Berserk	"The specific name of this new species is derived from "Guts", which is the protagonist of the Japanese manga "Berserk" by Mr Kentaro Miura. The author is a fan of this manga. Miura died in May 2021, when this paper was being prepared. This new species was named to mourn his death because it was collected from Miura's birthplace Chiba Prefecture."	
Luthela kagami Wei & Lin, 2023	Spider	Hiiragi Kagami, Lucky Star	"The specific epithet is from 'Hiiragi Kagami', a fictional character from the comic 'Lucky Star' (written and illustrated by the Japanese cartoonist Yoshimizu Kagami) with haircut similar to 'Asuka Langley Soryu'; the name refers to the great similarity between these two new species [Luthela kagami and Luthela asuka]."	
Apseudes ranma Matsushima & Kakui, 2024	Tanaid	Ranma Saotome, Ranma ½	"In the story, Ranma (originally male) changes "its" sex from male to female and vice versa when doused with cold or boiling water. The hermaphroditic condition of the new species was reminiscent of Ranma."	
†Pochitaserra Villafaña et al., 2025	Sawshark	Pochita, Chainsaw Man	"The genus name combines the name pochita (the name of the main character, also known as the 'Chainsaw Devil'), from Chainsaw Man, a Japanese anime, and the Latin word serra (saw), referring to the similarity of the Chainsaw Devil to the elongated, saw-like snout that sawsharks possess."	

== Films ==
=== Disney and Pixar (1921–present) ===
Taxon	Type	Named for	Notes	Ref
Ceraeochrysa michaelmuris Adams & Penny, 1987	Lacewing	Mickey Mouse	"The species name emphasizes the resemblance of the protruding gonapsis lobes to mouse ears"	
†Celmus michaelmus Adrain & Fortey, 1997	Trilobite	Mickey Mouse	Its abdominal apex looks like Mickey Mouse	
†Bambiraptor feinbergi Burnham et al., 2000	Theropod dinosaur	Bambi	"Bambi: from the now widely used nickname for the holotype, originally coined by the Linster family"	
Adelopsis dumbo Gnaspini & Peck, 2001	Beetle	Dumbo	Named "because the beetle's aedeagus, which resembles an elephant proboscis, has at its tip a very large lateral projection resembling an ear"	
Corinna zecarioca Rodrigues et al., 2014	Spider	José Carioca, Saludos Amigos	"The specific name is a noun in apposition referring to Walt Disney's character "José Carioca" or, shortly, "Zé Carioca", created in 1942. The green parrot Zé Carioca is a friend of Donald Duck and the comic books are still popular among Brazilian kids, especially those born in the city of Rio de Janeiro, the Cariocas."	
Endodrelanva jimini Tan & Kamaruddin, 2016	Cricket	Jiminy Cricket, Pinocchio	"The species is named after the Disney character, Jiminy cricket, from the book The Adventure of Pinocchio."	
Siphopteron dumbo Ong & Gosliner, 2017	Sea slug	Dumbo	The specific name "refers to the similarity of this species to the Disney character, Dumbo the elephant, as it swims through the water."	
Helobdella buzz Iwama, Nogueira & Gonçalves, 2017	Leech	Buzz Lightyear, Toy Story	"The protrusion of the skin on the nuchal region of Helobdella buzz n. sp. is a main diagnostic characteristic and its size and location resemble an astronaut helmet, as that of Buzz Lightyear."	
Trichonympha hueyi Boscaro et al., 2017	Parabasalids	Huey, Dewey, and Louie	Referring to "the three small and similar nephews of Donald Duck".	
Trichonympha deweyi Boscaro et al., 2017	Parabasalids	Huey, Dewey, and Louie	Referring to "the three small and similar nephews of Donald Duck".	
Trichonympha louiei Boscaro et al., 2017	Parabasalids	Huey, Dewey, and Louie	Referring to "the three small and similar nephews of Donald Duck".	
Trichonympha webbyae Boscaro et al., 2017	Parabasalids	Webby Vanderquack, DuckTales	"referring to the Disney character Webby, a small and adorable duckling unrelated to Donald Duck but unofficially referred to as the fourth nephew due to her similarity and friendship with the triplets."	
Epicratinus stitch Gonçalves & Brescovit, 2020	Spider	Stitch, Lilo & Stitch	"The specific epithet is a noun taken in apposition and is in reference to Stitch, a fictional character in Disney's Lilo & Stitch franchise. The shade of the colors of its ears resembles the spermathecae from ventral view."	
Larnaca walle Yin & Meng, 2021	Raspy Cricket	WALL-E	Described from Yingjiang, Yunnan, China. This species is named after the title character of film WALL-E. WALL-E is a waste-collecting robot working on a future Earth devastated by excessive consumerism, corporate greed, and environmental neglect. In the original description, the authors emphasize the film's environmental message about the importance of caring for Earth and preserving its ability to support life.	
Maratus nemo Schubert, 2021	Spider	Nemo, Finding Nemo	"The specific epithet refers to the colouration of the male of this species which resembles that of the character Nemo"	
†Osparvis aurorae Viertler, Schwarz, Verheyde & Klopfstein, 2024	Wasp	Aurora, Sleeping Beauty	A fossil species found in Baltic amber and "Named after the fictional character Aurora from the Walt Disney movie "Sleeping Beauty", since this specimen is beautifully preserved."	

=== Looney Tunes (1930–present) ===
Taxon	Type	Named for	Notes	Ref
Strotarchus beepbeep Bonaldo, et al., 2012	Spider	"Beep beep", Road Runner	"The specific name refers to the cartoon character Road Runner, which always manages to fool its enemy Wile E. Coyote in the classic TV series Looney Tunes and Merrie Melodies. The Road Runner character vocalises mostly with a sharp " Beep, Beep " and was inspired upon the bird Geococcyx californianus that is recorded in Arizona, where the species here described is known to occur."	
Cremnops wyleycoyotius Tucker et al., 2015	Wasp	Wile E. Coyote	"Named for the collector, J. Wiley, and for the holotype itself, which sneakily (like the well-known canine) remained undescribed until now"	

=== Orson Welles (1915–1985) ===
Taxon	Type	Named for	Notes	Ref
Erwiniana rosebudae (Erwin, 1994)	Ground beetle	Rosebud, Citizen Kane	"The species is named for the sled in Orsen Wells' film, Citizen Kane, because the male genitalic apex is gracefully curved as was the front of the sled, yet such gracefulness existed in a crumbling empire as does the beetle in a rapidly disappearing rainforest."	
Orsonwelles ambersonorum Hormiga, 2002	Spider	The Magnificent Ambersons		
Orsonwelles arcanus Hormiga, 2002	Spider	Mr. Arkadin	"The species epithet, a Latin noun in apposition meaning 'hidden, concealed', is derived from the Orson Welles film Mr. Arkadin/Confidential Report (1955)."	
Orsonwelles calx Hormiga, 2002	Spider	Harry Lime, The Third Man	"This species is named after Harry Lime, Welles' character in Carol Reed's movie The Third Man (1949). Calx is a Latin noun in apposition meaning 'lime' (that is, the mineral)."	
Orsonwelles falstaffius Hormiga, 2002	Spider	John Falstaff, Chimes at Midnight		
Orsonwelles iudicium Hormiga, 2002	Spider	The Trial (1962 film)	Iudicium means 'trial' in Latin.	
Orsonwelles macbeth Hormiga, 2002	Spider	Macbeth (1948 film)		
Orsonwelles malus Hormiga, 2002	Spider	Touch of Evil	"The species epithet, from the Latin adjective meaning 'evil,' is derived from the Orson Welles film Touch of Evil (1958)."	
Orsonwelles othello Hormiga, 2002	Spider	Othello (1951 film)		
Orsonwelles polites Hormiga, 2002	Spider	Citizen Kane	"The species epithet is derived from the Orson Welles film Citizen Kane (1941). Polites (citizen) is a Greek noun in apposition."	
Orsonwelles ventus Hormiga, 2002	Spider	The Other Side of the Wind	"The species epithet, a Latin noun in apposition meaning 'wind', is derived from Welles' posthumous (and unfinished) film The Other Side of the Wind."	

=== Godzilla (1954–present) ===
Taxon	Type	Named for	Notes	Ref
Godzilliidae Schram, Yager & Emerson, 1986	Crustacean	Godzilla	See for Godzillius, the type genus of the family.	
Godzillius Yager, 1986	Crustacean	Godzilla	"A reference to the almost monstrously large size of these animals as adults, the extreme styliform talon on the maxillule, and the grappling-like claws on the maxillae and maxillipedes."	
Godzilliognomus Yager, 1989	Crustacean	Godzilla	"The name is derived from Godzillius, the largest known remipede and the New Latin word "gnomus", meaning a diminutive fabled being".	
Pleomothra Yager, 1989	Crustacean	Mothra	"In keeping with the spirit of the first described godzilliid, the name is derived from the Japanese horror creature Mothra" and the Greek word "pleo", meaning swim".	
†Gojirasaurus Carpenter, 1997	Theropod dinosaur	Gojira, the Japanese name of Godzilla	"Gojira, a large fictional monster of the Japanese cinema, in reference to the large size of this Triassic theropod."	
Basitrodes godzilla Nomura, 2003	Beetle	Godzilla	"The specific name of this species is derived from "Godzilla" for its large body and rough surface of the head. The "Godzilla" is a monstrous beast illustrated in a series of Japanese cinemas, which is sized a hundred meters in height, sixty thousands tons in weight, and looks like a rough faced dinosaur. The English spell of "Godzilla" is given in the Hollywood picture "Godzilla" remade from the Japanese one in 1999." [sic]	
†Diplacodon gigan Mihlbachler, 2011	Odd-toed ungulate	Gigan	"'Gigan' is a fictional giant horned monster first appearing in the 1972 Japanese film 'Godzilla versus Gigan' and other Godzilla films thereafter."	
Angirasu Hoenemann et al., 2013	Crustacean	Anguirus	"Angirasu is another of the legendary Japanese Kaiju monsters that battled with Godzilla."	
Pleomothridae Hoenemann et al., 2013	Crustacean	Mothra	See for Pleomothra, the type genus of the family.	
Kumonga Hoenemann et al., 2013	Crustacean	Kumonga	"Kumonga, a giant spider, is one of the legendary Japanese Kaiju monsters that battled with Godzilla."	
Kumongidae Hoenemann et al, 2013	Crustacean	Kumonga	See for Kumonga, the type genus of the family.	
†Blackburnia godzilla Liebherr & Porch, 2015	Beetle	Godzilla	"The large body size exhibited by these beetles led us to colloquially name the species after Godzilla"	
†Blackburnia mothra Liebherr & Porch, 2015	Beetle	Mothra	"Among the Kauai Blackburnia, beetles of this species exhibit a bodysize second only to B. godzilla, leading to use of the epithet mothra [...], Godzilla’s cinematic companion."	
Amblyrhynchus cristatus godzilla Miralles et al., 2017	Marine Iguana	Godzilla	"The subspecific epithet refers to the fictional saurian monster from the eponym movie franchise created by Tomoyuki Tanaka (IMDb, 2016). Explicitly mentioned in the title sequence of the 1990s American remake (Emmerich, 1998), the physical appearance and swimming behaviour of marine iguanas were a significant source of inspiration to the creature's designer (Patrick Tatopoulos, personal communication). The name is an invariable noun in apposition."	
Mecodema godzilla Seldon & Buckley, 2019	Beetle	Godzilla	"Named for the giant mythical monster of Japan. Godzilla is a non-Latinised word so spelling remains invariant."	
Microgaster godzilla Fernandez-Triana & Kamino, 2020	Wasp	Godzilla	"The wasp's parasitization behaviour bears some loose resemblance to the kaiju character, in the sense that the wasp (after diving underwater to search for its host, a moth caterpillar) suddenly emerges from the water (to parasitize the host), similar to how Godzilla suddenly emerges from the water in the movies."	
Scytodes kumonga Zamani & Marusik, 2020	Spider	Kumonga	"The specific epithet is a noun in apposition and refers to a fictional, mutated, enormous "spitting" spider first appearing in Toho's 1967 movie Son of Godzilla."	
Agroeca angirasu Zamani & Marusik, 2021	Spider	Anguirus	"The new species is named after Anguirus (Hepburn: Angirasu), a fictional monster which first appeared in Godzilla Raids Again (1955) and has a covering of spikes over his carapace, referring to the distinct rows of six pairs of long spines on the tibiae I and II of the holotype specimen."	
Ramisyllis kingghidorahi Aguado et al., 2022	Bristle worm	King Ghidorah	"The name refers to King Ghidorah, the three-headed and two-tailed monster enemy of Godzilla. Both characters were created by Tomoyuki Tanaka based on Japanese mythology and folklore. King Ghidorah is a branching fictitious animal that can regenerate its lost ends."	
†Mutotylaspis Fraaije, Mychko, Barsukov & Jagt, 2023	Crustacean	MUTO	"A combination of 'Muto', a giant parasitic monster (daikaiju) from the Godzilla universe that walks on four legs, and the generic name Tylaspis"	
Evoplosoma anguirus Mah, 2024	Starfish	Anguirus	"This species name is derived from the Japanese kaiju Anguirus, from the 1955 movie Godzilla Raids Again alluding to the numerous spines present on this species."	
†Mosura Moysiuk & Caron, 2025	Radiodont	Mothra	"From the name of the fictional Japanese monster, or kaiju モスラ (also known as 'Mothra'), romanized according to Hepburn style, in reference to the moth-like appearance of the animal."	

=== Alien (1979–present) ===
Taxon	Type	Named for	Notes	Ref
†Xenomorphia Krogmann et al., 2018	Wasp	Xenomorph	"The genus name refers to the endoparasitoid Xenomorph creature featured in the "Alien" media franchise."	
Dolichogenidea xenomorph Fagan-Jeffries & Austin, 2018	Wasp	Xenomorph	"This species is named for the fictional creature from the movie franchise 'Alien', which reportedly was inspired by the lifecycle of parasitic wasps."	
Epizoanthus xenomorphoideus Kise et al., 2019	Zoanthid	Xenomorph	"The new species is named after a fictional alien xenomorph creature in the famous 1979 movie Alien, as this species resembles the 'face hugger' xenomorph. 'Xenomorph' is combined with the Latin word 'oideus' meaning 'resembling'."	
Coptoborus newt Smith & Cognato, 2021	Beetle	Rebecca "Newt" Jorden		
Coptoborus ripley Smith & Cognato, 2021	Beetle	Ellen Ripley	"This species is glabrous and reminiscent of Ripley's shaved head in 'Alien 3'"	
Coptoborus vasquez Smith & Cognato, 2021	Beetle	Private Vasquez		
Phyllophaga xenomorphallica Barria, Clavijo-Bustos & Ramírez-Ponce, 2022	Beetle	Xenomorph	"The specific name refers to the fictitious extraterrestrial species, the Xenomorph from the movie saga "Alien" designed by Hans R. Giger and originally directed by Ridley Scott, due to the similarity of the male genitalia in lateral view with the shape of the skull of this fictitious alien species. The epithet is a compound word composed by the noun Xenomorph, common name of the fictitious alien species, and the latin singular feminine adjective phallica in the nominative case (latinized from the ancient greek phallikós), meaning that is relating to, or characteristic of the penis."	
Bernardimyia xenomorpha (Pujol-Luz & Lamas, 2023)	Fly	Xenomorph	"due to the similarity of the shape of the phallus [...] with the 'inner jaw' of the alien creature, the iconic science fiction character created by Swiss surrealist artist H. R. Giger."; It was originally described as Bernardia xenomorpha, with a new monotypic genus created for this species and named after entomologist Nelson Bernardi; however this name was later found to be preoccupied by the scale insect genus Bernardia Ashmead, 1891 (now syonymised with Saissetia Deplanche, 1858), and was replaced with Bernardimyia Pujol-Luz & Lamas, 2023.	
Halictoxenos xenomorphae Zheng, Gong, Li & Zhou, 2025	Stylops	Xenomorph	"The species is named after xenomorph from the Alien series of movies, in reference to their similar parasitic and mysterious life history."	

=== A Nightmare on Elm Street (1984-2010) ===
Taxon	Type	Named for	Notes	Ref
Freddius Takeda & Kajihara, 2018	Flatworm	Freddy Krueger	A genus of rhabdocoel flatworms native to sandy intertidal zone areas of northern Japan.	
†Firkantus freddykruegeri Viertler, Klopfstein & Spasojevic, 2023	Wasp	Freddy Krueger	"Named after the fictional character Freddy Krueger from the horror movie "A nightmare on Elm Street". Alludes to the shared characteristics of the fictional character and the fossil species—long claws and arolium.	

=== Terminator (1984–present) ===
Taxon	Type	Named for	Notes	Ref
Hortipes terminator Bosselaers & Jocqué, 2000	Spider	The Terminator	The male's pedipalps resemble a "futuristic gun"	
Coptoborus sarahconnor Smith & Cognato, 2021	Bark beetle	Sarah Connor	"The vermiculate elytral declivity gives the species a rough appearance like the character it recognizes."	

=== Crocodile Dundee (1986-2001) ===
Taxon	Type	Named for	Notes	Ref
Pristomerus dundeei Klopfstein, 2016	Wasp	Michael "Crocodile" Dundee, Crocodile Dundee	An Australian species whose "name refers to one of the most famous Australians, the character "Crocodile Dundee" from the 1986 comedy movie set in the Australian outback."	
Qrocodiledundee outbackense Fernandez-Triana & Boudreault, 2018	Wasp	Crocodile Dundee	"Named after the iconic Australian movie "Crocodile Dundee", one of the favorite movies of the first author [and] after the Outback, the vast and remote interior of Australia where the holotype specimen was collected."	

=== Predator (1987–present) ===
Taxon	Type	Named for	Notes	Ref
Predatoroonops Brescovit, Rheims & Ott, 2012	Goblin spider	Predator	A genus of goblin spiders native to Brazil; "The name refers the fact that all species show the frontal area of the male chelicerae with modified structures that resemble the face of the Predator character"	
Predatoroonops anna Brescovit, Rheims & Bonaldo, 2012	Goblin spider	Anna	"refers to the character Anna, played by Elpidia Carrillo"	
Predatoroonops billy Brescovit, Rheims & Ott, 2012	Goblin spider	Billy	"for Billy Sole, played by Sonny Landham."	
Predatoroonops blain Brescovit, Rheims & Ott, 2012	Goblin spider	Blain	"refers to the character Blain Cooper, played by Jesse Ventura"	
Predatoroonops chicano Brescovit, Rheims & Santos, 2012	Goblin spider	Poncho	"a second nickname for the character Jorge "Poncho" Ramirez, played by Richard Chaves"	
Predatoroonops dillon Brescovit, Rheims & Bonaldo, 2012	Goblin spider	Dillon	"refers to the character George [sic; actually Alan] Dillon, a former teammate of Dutch and current CIA agent, played by Carl Weathers"	
Predatoroonops dutch Brescovit, Rheims & Bonaldo, 2012	Goblin spider	Dutch	"refers to the main character in the movie Predator, Major Alan "Dutch" Schaefer, played by Arnold Schwarzenegger."	
Predatoroonops maceliot Brescovit, Rheims & Ott, 2012	Goblin spider	Mac	"refers to the character Mac Eliot, played by Bill Duke"	
Predatoroonops olddemon Brescovit, Rheims & Santos, 2012	Goblin spider	Predator (fictional species)	"a popular name used by natives of the fictional nation of Val Verde for the Predators"	
Predatoroonops phillips Brescovit, Rheims & Santos, 2012	Goblin spider	General Phillips	"refers to the character General Homer Phillips, played by Robert G. Armstrong"	
Predatoroonops poncho Brescovit, Rheims & Ott, 2012	Goblin spider	Poncho	"for Jorge "Poncho" Ramirez, played by Richard Chaves"	
Predatoroonops rickhawkins Brescovit, Rheims & Bonaldo, 2012	Goblin spider	Hawkins	"refers to the character Rick Hawkins, played by Shane Black"	
Predatoroonops vallarta Brescovit, Rheims & Bonaldo, 2012	Goblin spider	Puerto Vallarta	"refers to Puerto Vallarta, Mexico, one of the filming locations for the movie Predator; the set there is now a tourist attraction." (the species itself is not native to Mexico but Rio de Janeiro state, Brazil)	
Predatoroonops valverde Brescovit, Rheims & Ott, 2012	Goblin spider	Val Verde (fictional country)	"The specific name refers to the South/Central American country Val Verde, a fictional country created for Predator [sic] by Hollywood filmmakers, to avoid getting into legal or diplomatic disputes." (In actuality, Val Verde was created for a previous Schwarzenegger film, Commando, and its status as the location of the events of Predator is a fan theory, supported by Commando screenwriter Steven E. de Souza; other media of the Predator franchise place the action of the original in Guatemala or Colombia.)	
Predatoroonops yautja Brescovit, Rheims & Santos, 2012	Goblin spider	Predator (fictional species)	"refers to the fictional name by which Predators are known on their planet."	
Predatoroonops naru Oliveira-Santos & Santos, 2026	Goblin spider	Naru, Prey	"The species name is derived from the movie Prey (2022), a part of the Predator movie franchise, which is set in the 18th century. It honours Naru, a native-american hero in the movie and the first female protagonist of the series, who stands out for using her intelligence and strategy to defeat the predator."	

=== The Fifth Element (1997) ===
Taxon	Type	Named for	Notes	Ref
Agra lilu Erwin, 2000	Ground beetle	Leeloo	Named after Leeloo for being "red-headed"	
Hirudicryptus quintumelementum Korsós et al., 2008	Millipede	The Fifth Element	"The species is named as the fifth member of the millipede order Siphonocryptida; but also in honour of the alien custodians (called mondoshawans) [...] whom the head and the collum of the new species (and actually all members of the order) resemble superficially"	
Coptoborus leeloo Smith & Cognato, 2021	Bark beetle	Leeloo		

=== The Big Lebowski (1998) ===
Taxon	Type	Named for	Notes	Ref
Anelosimus biglebowski Agnarsson, 2006	Spider	The Big Lebowski		
Anelosimus dude Agnarsson, 2006	Spider	Jeffrey "The Dude" Lebowski, The Big Lebowski		

=== Madagascar (2005-2022) ===
Taxon	Type	Named for	Notes	Ref
Oecobius kowalskii Magalhães & Santos, 2018	Spider	Kowalski	Four species of disc web spiders endemic to Madagascar, described concurrently and named after the four penguins of the Madagascar franchise.	
Paroecobius skipper Magalhães & Santos, 2018	Spider	Skipper	Four species of disc web spiders endemic to Madagascar, described concurrently and named after the four penguins of the Madagascar franchise.	
Paroecobius rico Magalhães & Santos, 2018	Spider	Rico	Four species of disc web spiders endemic to Madagascar, described concurrently and named after the four penguins of the Madagascar franchise.	
Paroecobius private Magalhães & Santos, 2018	Spider	Private	Four species of disc web spiders endemic to Madagascar, described concurrently and named after the four penguins of the Madagascar franchise.	

=== Avatar (2009–present) ===
Taxon	Type	Named for	Notes	Ref
†Ikrandraco avatar Wang et al., 2014	Pterosaur	Ikran	"Ikran, from the fictional flying creature portrayed in the movie Avatar that shows a well developed dentary crest and draco, from the Latin meaning dragon."	
Eukoenenia eywa Souza & Ferreira, 2018	Palpigrade	Eywa	"The species is named after Eywa, the guiding force and deity of Pandora, acting to keep the ecosystem in perfect equilibrium, according to the movie 'Avatar'. This name was given in reference to the threats imposed by the mining activities in the region where this species and many other endemic species occur."	
Eukoenenia navi Souza & Ferreira, 2018	Palpigrade	The Na'vi	"The species is named after Na'vi, the race of extraterrestrial humanoids who inhabit the jungle moon Pandora in the movie 'Avatar'. This name was given in reference to the threats imposed by the mining activities in the region where this species and many other endemic species occur."	
Eukoenenia neytiri Souza & Ferreira, 2018	Palpigrade	Neytiri	"The species is named after Neytiri, the Na'vi princess of the Omaticaya clan in the movie 'Avatar'. This name was given in reference to the threats imposed by the mining activities in the region where this species and many other endemic species occur."	
Arctesthes avatar Patrick, Patrick & Hoare, 2019	Moth	Avatar	"The name refers to the James Cameron movie Avatar; like the indigenous people and fauna of that film, the moth is vulnerable to habitat change or destruction in its very limited area of occurrence."	
†Oligomonoctenus neytiriae Nel et al, 2023	Sawfly	Neytiri	"Named after Neytiri, princess of the Na'vi people from Pandora planet in the Avatar animation movie (James Cameron, 2009 and 2022), a blue and bioluminescent skin people who defend nature and life in all its forms."	
Avatar Aneesh, Ohtsuka, Kondo & Helna, 2024	Copepod	Ikran	"The generic name is derived from a world-famous epic science fiction film, James Cameron's "Avatar", in which the dragon-like aerial predator "Mountain Banshee" with two pairs of wings reminds us of the present new taxon with two pairs of lateral processes on the trunk".	
†Torukjara Pêgas, 2024	Pterosaur	Toruk	"The name refers to the superficial resemblance between the toruk and tapejarids, both of which are winged creatures that bear large sagittal crests on the rostrum and mandible."	

=== How to Train Your Dragon (2010–present) ===
Taxon	Type	Named for	Notes	Ref
Mixtophyes toothlessi González-Casarrubios, Martínez Arbizu & Sánchez, 2023	Mud dragon	Toothless, the Night Fury	Described from the Clarion-Clipperton Zone in the northeastern Pacific Ocean. The species is named after Toothless, the Night Fury dragon from the How to Train Your Dragon books and films. Its middorsal spinose processes reminded the authors of the protrusions along the dragon's back. Additionally, a broken lateral terminal spine in the described specimen resembled Toothless's damaged tail in the animated film.	
Melanabropsis nightfury Yin, 2024	Chevron Cricket	Toothless, the Night Fury	Described from Hainan Island, China. The species is named after the Night Fury dragon from the fantasy film series How to Train Your Dragon. The original description explains that the name symbolizes the human protagonist's efforts to change humanity's perception of dragons, illustrating the possibility of harmonious coexistence between humans and nature. It also emphasizes that people, despite being small compared with nature, can show respect and kindness towards the natural world.	

=== Other films ===
Taxon	Type	Named for	Notes	Ref
†Chloridops regiskongi James & Olson, 1991	Finch	King Kong, King Kong	"Olson was once quoted as saying this species was 'a giant, gargantuan, a King Kong finch', an appellation that would never have occurred to him, this being a typical example of the liberties taken with quotation marks by the print media"	
Eubetia boop Brown, 1998	Moth	Betty Boop		
†Ozraptor subotaii Long & Molnar, 1998	Theropod dinosaur	Subotai, Conan the Barbarian	"After the fictional character Subotai, a swift running thief from the film "Conan the Barberian" [...], based on the Robert E. Howard books."	
†Sinemys gamera Brinkman & Peng, 1993	Turtle	Gamera	The fossil has wing-like projections from its shell.	
†Yinlong Xu et al., 2006	Dinosaur	Crouching Tiger, Hidden Dragon	"'Yin' and 'long' mean 'hiding' and 'dragon' in Chinese, respectively, derived from the movie ‘Crouching Tiger, Hidden Dragon' which was filmed in the locality where the holotype was found."	
Shrekin Britto & Navia, 2007	Mite	Shrek	Named "because of the resemblance of the long, laterodorsal scapular tubercules to the long stalked ears of this character"	
Teratohyla amelie (Cisneros-Heredia & Meza-Ramos 2007)	Glass frog	Amélie Poulain, Amélie	Originally described as Cochranella amelie and subsequently transferred to genus Teratohyla. "The specific name [...] of this new species of Glassfrog is for Amelie, protagonist of the extraordinary movie Le Fabuleux Destin d'Amélie Poulain; a movie where little details play an important role in the achievement of joie de vivre; like the important role that Glassfrogs and all amphibians and reptiles play in the health of our planet."	
Tithaeus drac Lian, Zhu & Kury, 2008	Harvestman	Dracs, Enemy Mine	"Species name refers to the fictitious reptilian species called "drac" from the 1985 science fiction film "Enemy mine", produced by Twentieth Century Fox and directed by Wolfgang Petersen. The shape of the drac's head is strongly reminiscent of the cheliceral bulla of T. drac sp. nov.."	
†Gamerabaena Lyson & Joyce, 2010	Turtle	Gamera	Name for the "fire-breathing turtle from the 1965 movie Gamera, in allusion to his fire breathing capabilities and the Hell Creek Formation"	
Eoperipatus totoro Oliveira et al., 2013	Velvet worm	Totoro, My Neighbour Totoro	Named after Totoro, who "uses a many-legged animal [Catbus] as a vehicle"	
Cystomastacoides kiddo Quicke & Butcher, 2013	Wasp	Beatrix Kiddo, Kill Bill	"Named after the character Beatrice Kiddo in the Quentin Tarantino 'Kill Bill' films because of the deadly biology to the host."	
Axima sidi Arias-Penna et al., 2014	Wasp	Sid, Ice Age	"The name is based on facial resemblance between these two, which is mainly caused by shared bulbous eyes, and the characteristic anteroventral orientation of accompanying structures"	
Prochyliza georgekaplani Martín-Vega, 2014	Fly	George Kaplan, North by Northwest	"The specific epithet [...] makes reference to George Kaplan, the nonexistent spy from Alfred Hitchcock's 1959 film North by Northwest for whom the main character is mistaken. Like in that celebrated film, P. georgekaplani had been misidentified as a "nonexistent" species (i.e. an unvalid [sic] name), at least in central Spain"	
Nosferatu De la Maza-Benignos, Ornelas-García, Lozano-Vilano, García-Ramírez & Doadrio, 2015	Cichlid fish	Nosferatu (1922)	Named in honor of Count Orlok from Nosferatu for the well-developed fangs possessed by the genus.	
†Zuul crurivastator Arbour & Evans, 2017	Dinosaur	Zuul, Ghostbusters		
Uroplatus kelirambo Ratsoavina et al., 2017	Lizard	John Rambo, Rambo (franchise)	"The specific epithet kelirambo is composed of the Malagasy words for small (kely) and tail (rambo). The name refers to the small and very thin tail of this species, but also points to the movie character Rambo and his toughness. This species shares with other members of the U. ebenaui group a grim, Rambo-esque expression, and is tough, surviving at exceptionally high altitudes, unique among Madagascar's nocturnal geckos."	
†Prolatcyclus kindzadza Mychko et al., 2019	Crustacean	Kin-dza-dza!	A fossil cycloid from the Carboniferous of Orenburg Oblast, Russia.	
Thalassozetes balboa Pfingstl, Lienhard & Baumann, 2019	Mite	Rocky Balboa, Rocky (franchise)	"As this species was found in Panama and Florida, the name was chosen to somehow relate to both locations. The specific epithet "balboa" (given as noun in apposition) refers to the Spanish explorer Vasco Núñez de Balboa; he led the first European expedition that crossed the Isthmus of Panama in 1513 and the Panamanian currency is named after him. It also refers to Rocky Balboa, a well-known movie character, a descendant of immigrants who made his fortune in the USA. The new species similarly may be an immigrant that has now successfully settled in North America. Moreover, T. balboa sp. nov. was predominantly found on "rocky" substrate."	
Paraeulioptera emitflesti Massa, 2020	Katydid	Emit Flesti, Faraway, So Close!	"Emit Flesti (read back to front: Time Itself) is the mysterious figure in the movie Faraway so close directed by Win Wenders [sic] and produced in 1993. Among the characters there were Emit Flesti (Willem Dafoe), Cassiel (Otto Sander) and Raphaela (Nastassja Kinski), two angels who observed the busy life of reunited Berlin. Emit Flesti is famous for his sentences on the time meaning (e.g.: time is the absence of money; time is your god, if you are its dog; we are the creators of time, the victims of time, and the killers of time; time is timeless)"	
Coptoborus brigman Smith & Cognato, 2021	Bark beetle	Dr. Lindsey Brigman, The Abyss		
Coptoborus furiosa Smith & Cognato, 2021	Bark beetle	Furiosa, Mad Max: Fury Road	"The 'spiny' elytra give the species a fierce appearance."	
Coptoborus trinity Smith & Cognato, 2021	Bark beetle	Trinity, The Matrix	"Three types of setae (trifid, scale-like and bristle-like) help diagnose this species."	
Coptoborus vrataski Smith & Cognato, 2021	Bark beetle	Rita Vrataski, Edge of Tomorrow	"The granulate elytral gives the species an armored appearance reminiscent of the character's combat jacket."	
Trigonopterus gundala Narakusumo & Riedel, 2021	Weevil	Gundala	This species is endemic to Sulawesi, Indonesia. "The black and ferruginous colors of this species resemble Gundala's movie costume."	
†Anisotremus rambo Lin & Wolf, 2022	Fish	Rambo: First Blood Part II	A fossil grunt from the Eocene of Texas, USA, "Named after the famous movie 'Rambo', which alludes to the unrestrained, wild, but valiant appearance of the otoliths."	
Proctoporus optimus Mamani, Cruz, Mallqui, & Catenazzi, 2022	Lizard	Optimus Prime, Transformers film series	"patronymic for Optimus Prime, leader of the Autobots in the science fiction movie Transformers, in recognition of the seventh film that was filmed in Machu Picchu [the type locality]: Transformers: Rise of the Beasts."	
Paravima totoro García & Villarreal, 2023	Harvestman	Totoro, My Neighbour Totoro	"For us, the paramedian armature of the new species resembles the ears of the charismatic Totoro. We take advantage of exalting the excellent work of Studio Ghibli with this tribute."	
Ceroptres jarethi Nastasi, Smith & Davis, 2024	Wasp	Jareth, Labyrinth	"Named for Jareth the Goblin King, the primary antagonist portrayed by David Bowie in Jim Henson's Labyrinth who is a thief, trickster, and master of disguise."	
†Diuqin lechiguanae Porfiri et al., 2024	Dinosaur	Lechiguana, Nazareno Cruz and the Wolf	A paravian carnivore dinosaur from the Cretaceous of Argentina.	
Branchiostegus sanae Huang, Chen, Ke & Zhang, 2025	Tilefish	San, Princess Mononoke	"The name sanae refers to the heroine's name, San in Hayao Miyazaki's film Princess Mononoke, who has similar red under-eye stripes to this species and symbolizes the ideas and appeals of harmonious coexistence between man and nature that we want to share."	

== Television ==
=== The Muppets and Sesame Street (1955–present) ===
Taxon	Type	Named for	Notes	Ref
†Geragnostus waldorfstatleri Turvey, 2005	Trilobite	Statler and Waldorf	Named after "the resemblance of the pygidial axis to the heads of Waldorf and Statler"	
Parabradya samsoni Seifried, et al., 2007	Copepod	Samson, Sesamstraße	"This species is named after the German character 'Samson' of the TV show 'Sesame Street' because of its big size and the unique ornamentation of body and setae."	
†Austerops kermiti McKellar & Catterton, 2009	Trilobite	Kermit the Frog	"This species is named for the resemblance of the cephalon [...] to the face of Kermit the Frog, a character from Jim Henson's 'The Muppet Show'."	
Anataphrus kermiti Amati, 2014	Trilobite	Kermit the Frog	"Named for Kermit the Frog, who this species resembles when enrolled."	
†Hensonbatrachus kermiti Gardner & Brinkman, 2015	Frog	Jim Henson, Kermit the Frog		
Stelis oscargrouchii Karremans (2015)	Orchid	Oscar the Grouch	"The name honors Oscar Grouch, of whom I am reminded by this extraordinary flower"	
Ariadna gonzo Marsh, Stevens & Framenau, 2022	Tube-dwelling spider	Gonzo	"The specific epithet is in reference to the curved and hooked embolus of the pedipalp, which resembles the nose of the Muppet character Gonzo."	
†Kermitops So, Pardo & Mann, 2024	Amphibian	Kermit the Frog	"Generic epithet is derived from a combination of 'Kermit' the famous lissamphibian and beloved Muppets' character created and originally performed by Jim Henson, and the Greek suffix '-ops', meaning face."	
Solenostomus snuffleupagus Short & Harasti, 2026	Ghost pipefish	Mr. Snuffleupagus	"The specific epithet snuffleupagus refers to the shaggy character Mr. Snuffleupagus, also known as ‘Snuffy’, from the children's television series Sesame Street™, in allusion to the species' distinctly shaggy, filamentous appearance and snout reminiscent of the character's covering and trunk."	

=== Doctor Who (1963–present) ===
Taxon	Type	Named for	Notes	Ref
†Yochelcionella daleki Runnegar & Jell, 1976)	Mollusc	Daleks	A fossil Helcionellid from the Cambrian of Australia.	
†Mestoronema Wagner, 2002	Mollusc	Mestor, The Twin Dilemma	Named after "the ruler of the intelligent evil gastropods from the world's longest running science fiction serial, Doctor Who."	
Tetramorium dalek Hita Garcia & Fisher, 2014	Ant	Daleks	"During different stages of the revision we considered placing the material listed here as Tetramorium dalek in at least three to four different groups, which caused a significant amount of nuisance, especially to the first author. Naming this species after an evil, extra-terrestrial, and often annoying race was a logical consequence."	
Synchiropus sycorax Tea & Gill, 2016	Dragonet fish	Sycorax	"The species is named after the red-robed and caped Sycorax warriors from the BBC sci-fi series Dr. Who, in showing similarities in both coloration and grandiloquence of their garb."	
Cyclocardia dalek Pérez & Del Río, 2017	Bivalve	Daleks	The Daleks are "characterized by an armour with prominent circles, similar to the nodular external sculpture of this species".	
Choeras zygon Fagan-Jeffries, Cooper & Austin, 2019	Wasp	Zygons	"The shape-shifting nature of this fictional race mirrors the large morphological variability within C. zygon [...] The Zygon in Doctor Who also consume their 'host', a trait particularly relevant to endoparasitoid wasps."	
†Ophiotardis Thuy & Numberger-Thuy, 2021	Brittle star	TARDIS	"Genus name formed as a combination of óphis, Greek for serpent, a commonly used prefix in ophiuroid genus names, and Tardis, acronym for 'Time And Relative Dimension In Space'"	
Dalek nationi Noyes, 2023	Wasp	Daleks, Terry Nation	"This species is named in honour of Terry Nation, creator of the Daleks, an alien species that has terrified children for the past 60 years." John S. Noyes, who described the genus, said, "I thought it was a good name for a genus and a bit of fun having been a big fan of Doctor Who in my early years."	
Ceroptres daleki Nastasi, Smith & Davis, 2024	Wasp	Daleks	"Named for the Daleks, a species of aliens from the Doctor Who franchise widely regarded as merciless, destructive creatures who are devoted only to usurping all life forms across the universe. Just as the Daleks travel between worlds to overtake new enemies, C. daleki has evidently journeyed to a new world in its association with galls of midges rather than those of oak gall wasps."	
Ceroptres songae Nastasi, Smith & Davis, 2024	Wasp	River Song	"Named for River Song, a character from the Doctor Who franchise portrayed by Alex Kingston. Song is a noted trickster and thief who encounters the titular Doctor numerous times throughout their interplanetary adventures. She is also the focus of a major plot twist in the show's sixth series, therein overturning audiences' expectations and providing another layer to Song's association with subversion, and therefore inquiline gall wasps."	
†Tardisia McCoy et al., 2025	Artiopod	TARDIS	A genus of vicissicaudatan artiopods from the Mazon Creek fossil beds of the Carboniferous of Illinois, USA, whose name "is inspired by the TARDIS time machine in the TV show Dr. Who, and refers to the large stratigraphic gap between this species and the next youngest members of the Vicissicaudata."	

=== Star Trek (1966–present) ===
Taxon	Type	Named for	Notes	Ref
Conus tribblei Walls, 1977	Sea snail	Tribbles	Named for a pet cat that was named Tribbles after the Star Trek alien species	
Agra dax Erwin, 2000	Beetle	Jadzia Dax	Also dedicated to Terry Farrell	
Xenaroswelliana deltaquadrant Erwin, 2007	Beetle	Delta Quadrant	" The word "deltaquadrant" is a Star Trek "run-together" word denoting an area of the popular television program's Universe where the Starship Voyager gets lost; the word is feminine. While there in the Delta Quadrant, the Starship crew faces Species 8472, an alien life form likely from a "fluidic" parallel Universe to our own. The carabid species described herein presents similar mental challenges in understanding what must surely be a mysterious way of life in the cerrado of Goiás, Brazil."	
†Boeckaspis geordii Karim, 2008	Trilobite	Geordi La Forge	"After the television character Geordi La Forge who wears a similar eye ridge like visor."	
†Annuntidiogenes worfi Fraaije, 2009	Hermit crab	Worf	Named "in reference to the wrinkled ornament of the anterior gastric region"	
Paridris gorn Talamas & Masner, 2012	Wasp	Gorn	"This species is named after a reptilian alien race from the original Star Trek television series for the similar appearance of their compound eyes. The epithet is treated as a noun in apposition."	
Ledella spocki Viegas, Benaim & Absalão, 2014	Mussel	Spock	Named because the species' "valves resembles the shape of the pointed ear of the Vulcans"	
Bolianus Karner, Salvato & Uliana, 2015	Beetle	Bolian	"The peculiar median groove along the head prompted us to derive the generic name from the 'Bolians', a fictitious species from the universe of the science fiction series 'Star Trek', characterized by a vertical suture running along the midline of head and face."	
Synopeas klingunculum Awad, 2021	Wasp	Klingons	"The epithet 'Synopeas klingunculum' means 'little Klingon' and refers to the rugose head sculpture, which resembles that of the fictional alien race from 'Star Trek'."	
Phanuromyia odo Nesheim, 2017	Wasp	Odo	Named after Odo "because this species has variable morphology"	
Spockia Roca-Cusachs et al., 2019	Stink bug	Spock	"[Spock] is a Vulcan/Human hybrid, this new genus shares with the commander Spock the fact that as it shares characters from genus Cazira and Blachia."	
Macrobiotus ripperi Stec, Vecchi & Michalczyk, 2021	Tardigrade	Ripper, Star Trek: Discovery	"Named after "Ripper", the giant tardigrade-like creature from the TV series "Star Trek: Discovery" to celebrate the presence of tardigrades in pop culture."	
Coptoborus hansen Smith & Cognato, 2021	Bark beetle	Seven of Nine, born Annika Hansen		
Coptoborus janeway Smith & Cognato, 2021	Bark beetle	Kathryn Janeway		
Coptoborus uhura Smith & Cognato, 2021	Bark beetle	Nyota Uhura	"This species is reddish and reminiscent of the uniform Uhura wore"	
Coptoborus yar Smith & Cognato, 2021	Bark beetle	Tasha Yar		
Roddenberryus kirk Sánchez-Ruiz & Bonaldo, 2023	Spider	James T. Kirk	Genus Roddenberryus was named after Star Trek creator Gene Roddenberry, and three newly discovered species in the genus were named after characters of the original series.	
Roddenberryus mccoy Sánchez-Ruiz & Bonaldo, 2023	Spider	Leonard McCoy	Genus Roddenberryus was named after Star Trek creator Gene Roddenberry, and three newly discovered species in the genus were named after characters of the original series.	
Roddenberryus spock Sánchez-Ruiz & Bonaldo, 2023	Spider	Spock	Genus Roddenberryus was named after Star Trek creator Gene Roddenberry, and three newly discovered species in the genus were named after characters of the original series.	
Boophis kirki Vences et al., 2024	Frog	James T. Kirk	"In reference to the otherworldly sounds by which these frogs fill Malagasy rainforests, some of them reminiscent of sounds of technical equipment in the fictional "Star Trek" universe, we here name and describe the seven new species in honor of fictional captains of starships"	
Boophis picardi Vences et al., 2024	Frog	Jean-Luc Picard	"In reference to the otherworldly sounds by which these frogs fill Malagasy rainforests, some of them reminiscent of sounds of technical equipment in the fictional "Star Trek" universe, we here name and describe the seven new species in honor of fictional captains of starships"	
Boophis siskoi Vences et al., 2024	Frog	Benjamin Sisko	"In reference to the otherworldly sounds by which these frogs fill Malagasy rainforests, some of them reminiscent of sounds of technical equipment in the fictional "Star Trek" universe, we here name and describe the seven new species in honor of fictional captains of starships"	
Boophis janewayae Vences et al., 2024	Frog	Kathryn Janeway	"In reference to the otherworldly sounds by which these frogs fill Malagasy rainforests, some of them reminiscent of sounds of technical equipment in the fictional "Star Trek" universe, we here name and describe the seven new species in honor of fictional captains of starships"	
Boophis archeri Vences et al., 2024	Frog	Jonathan Archer	"In reference to the otherworldly sounds by which these frogs fill Malagasy rainforests, some of them reminiscent of sounds of technical equipment in the fictional "Star Trek" universe, we here name and describe the seven new species in honor of fictional captains of starships"	
Boophis pikei Vences et al., 2024	Frog	Christopher Pike	"In reference to the otherworldly sounds by which these frogs fill Malagasy rainforests, some of them reminiscent of sounds of technical equipment in the fictional "Star Trek" universe, we here name and describe the seven new species in honor of fictional captains of starships"	
Boophis burnhamae Vences et al., 2024	Frog	Michael Burnham	"In reference to the otherworldly sounds by which these frogs fill Malagasy rainforests, some of them reminiscent of sounds of technical equipment in the fictional "Star Trek" universe, we here name and describe the seven new species in honor of fictional captains of starships"	
Agroecotettix idic Hill, 2024	Grasshopper	IDIC	"This name pays homage to the Star Trek principle of embracing diversity and complexity and highlights the rich biodiversity found in Mexico, the native land of this grasshopper. It is hoped that this name encourages appreciation and protection of the diverse forms of life that coexist on our planet."	
Picnoseus spock Campos-Soldini, Safenraiter & Roig-Juñent 2026	Beetle	Spock		
Spelaeodelphax nexus Santos & Asche, 2026	Planthopper	The Nexus, Star Trek Generations	"derived from the 1994 movie "Star Trek: Generations", in which Nexus refers to a place of bliss that connects different points in space-time, acting as a link between distinct realities." This species is endemic to a single cave in Brazil "where airflow between two distant entrances creates a pronounced seasonal microclimatic gradient."	

=== Dungeons & Dragons (1983–1985) ===
Taxon	Type	Named for	Notes	Ref
Regalana bobbyi Domahovski, Gonçalves & Cavichioli, 2014	True bug	Bobby, the Barbarian		
Regalana dianae Domahovski, Gonçalves & Cavichioli, 2014	True bug	Diana, the acrobat		
Regalana ericki Domahovski, Gonçalves & Cavichioli, 2014	True bug	Eric, the cavalier		
Regalana hanki Domahovski, Gonçalves & Cavichioli, 2014	True bug	Hank, the ranger		
Regalana prestoi Domahovski, Gonçalves & Cavichioli, 2014	True bug	Presto, the magician		
Regalana sheilae Domahovski, Gonçalves & Cavichioli, 2014	True bug	Sheila, the thief		
Regalana uni Domahovski, Gonçalves & Cavichioli, 2014	True bug	Uni, the unicorn		
Alpaida venger Castanheira & Baptista, 2015	Orb-weaver spider	Venger	"The specific name refers to the antagonist character "Venger", from the animated television series named and inspired on the game Dungeons & Dragons. The character has a single horn on the side of the head, resembling the long paramedian apophysis of the male palp."	

=== SpongeBob SquarePants (1999–present) ===
Taxon	Type	Named for	Notes	Ref
Spongiforma squarepantsii Desjardin, Peay & T.D.Bruns, 2011	Fungus	SpongeBob SquarePants	"Named in honor of the famed cartoon character SpongeBob SquarePants, whose shape shares a strong resemblance to the new fungus"	
Hemirhamphiculus krabsi Kritsky, 2017	Monogenean flatworm	Mr. Krabs	"The specific name (krabsi) was chosen because of the similar body shape of the species to that of Eugene H. Krabs (Mr. Krabs), a cartoon character in the children's animated television series SpongeBob SquarePants."	
Astrolirus patricki Zhang et al, 2020	Starfish	Patrick Star	"Since all specimens of the new species were observed in situ living on sponges, it was name[d] by Patrick to reflect this curious relationship."	
Xizangiana plankton Li & Zhang, 2022	Spider	Plankton	"The species is named after Sheldon J. Plankton, the main character in SpongeBob SquarePants, as the scape and anterior fold of epigyne of this new species resemble the body and flagellum of Plankton" (Note that Plankton is the antagonist, not the main character)	
Tripaphylus squidwardi Boxshall et al., 2022	Crustacean	Squidward Tentacles	"The shape of the head of this species resembles that of the character Squidward from the cartoon Sponge Bob."	

=== Battlestar Galactica (2003-2013) ===
Taxon	Type	Named for	Notes	Ref
Eucteniza caprica Bond & Godwin, 2013	Spider	Caprica-Six	Named "in reference to the humanoid cylon model Caprica 6, portrayed by Tricia Helfer in the remake of the science fiction series Battlestar Galactica."	
Coptoborus starbuck Smith & Cognato, 2021	Bark beetle	Kara "Starbuck" Thrace	"The vermiculate elytral declivity gives the species a tough persona like the character it recognizes."	

=== The Big Bang Theory (2007-2019) ===
Taxon	Type	Named for	Notes	Ref
Euglossa bazinga Nemésio & Ferrari, 2012	Orchid bee	"Bazinga"	"Euglossa bazinga sp. n. has tricked us for some time due to its similarity to E. ignita, which eventually led us to use 'bazinga'"	
Bazinga Gershwin & Davie, 2013	Jellyfish	"Bazinga"	"[B]azinga is a slang term in present popular culture, meaning 'fooled you!' [...] the type species, B. rieki, is so small that it has probably been overlooked in the past as a juvenile of a larger species."	
Kalcerrytus leonardi Bustamante, & Ruiz, 2016	Jumping spider	Leonard Hofstadter	"The specific name is dedicated to the fiction character of "The Big Bang Theory" TV show, Dr. Leonard Hofstadter."	

=== Breaking Bad (2008-2013) ===
Taxon	Type	Named for	Notes	Ref
Spiralix heisenbergi Quiñonero-Salgado, Alonso & Rolán, 2021	Freshwater snail	Walter White, alias Heisenberg, Breaking Bad	"The name is derived from the character Walter White, known as 'Heisenberg', in the TV series Breaking Bad."	
Hemipeplus heisenbergi KC & Pollock, 2025	Beetle	Walter White, alias Heisenberg, Breaking Bad	"The specific name [...] is given in allusion to Walter White's alias 'Heisenberg', the iconic protagonist of the acclaimed TV series 'Breaking Bad'."	
Hemipeplus saymyname KC & Pollock, 2025	Beetle	Breaking Bad	"The specific name [...] is given in allusion to the iconic phrase 'Say my name' from the popular TV series 'Breaking Bad'."	

=== Stranger Things (2016-2025) ===
Taxon	Type	Named for	Notes	Ref
Prosopanche demogorgoni Funez	Flowering plant	Demogorgon	"Demogorgon is a fictional monster whose mouth resembles the P. demogorgoni flower."	
Lankesteria pollywoga Iritani et al., 2021	Protist	Dart the pollywog	"Species name refers to the morphological resemblance of the trophozoite to both a tadpole and a stage two Demogorgon (i.e., pollywog in both cases) from the hit Netflix series Stranger Things (Season 2, Episode 3)."	
Demogorgonichthys Hart, Niemiller, Sandel, & Armbruster, 2026	Fish	Demogorgon	A genus of blind, cave-dwelling fish; "Demogorgon is the name of an underworld phantom demon in Greek mythology, and is additionally, the name of the Demon Prince in the role-playing game "Dungeons and Dragons" and a monster in the Netflix® television series "Stranger Things," where the creature can be found in the Upside-Down, a cave-like version of the real world."	

=== Other television series ===
Taxon	Type	Named for	Notes	Ref
Savignia naniplopi Bosselaers & Henderickx, 2002	Spider	Kabouter Plop	"The species is named after the gnome (Latin 'nanus') Plop, a popular character from children's stories whose cap is similar in shape to the male cephalic snout of the present species."	
Alphomelon simpsonorum Deans, 2003	Wasp	Simpson family, The Simpsons	"named in honor of television's Simpson family for helping the author maintain a positive attitude throughout his educational endeavors."	
Thelepus fraggleorum Capa & Hutchings, 2006	Polychaete worm	Fraggles, Fraggle Rock	"This species is dedicated to the Fraggles, incredible creatures that live in Fraggle Rock and that share some similarities with this new species."	
Acmopolynema isaura Triapitsyn & Berezovskiy, 2007	Fairyfly	Escrava Isaura (1976 TV series)		
Boccacciomymar (Prosto) maria Triapitsyn & Berezovskiy, 2007	Fairyfly	Simplemente María (1989 TV series)	"The specific name (a noun in apposition) is a common feminine name; this species is named so for no particular reason other that it makes a good combination with the subgeneric name ("Prosto Maria" was a popular soap opera serial shown on Russian television in the 1990s)."	
†Yochelcionella snorkorum Vendrasco et al., 2010	Mollusc	Snorks	Species of the fossil genus Yochelcionella, from the Cambrian of Australia, were characterized by a snorkel connected to their shell; this one is "Named after the Snorks, fictional creatures in an animated television series characterized by a prominent snorkel extending from the head."	
Moitessieria dexteri Corbella et al., 2012	Freshwater snail	Dexter Morgan, Dexter	"dedicated to the character of Dexter Morgan, serial killer in the TV show "Dexter", in allusion to the fact that the shell seems to have been cut with a knife at the level of the last whorl".	
Odontacolus zimi Valerio & Austin, 2013	Wasp	Zim, Invader Zim	"This species is named after the anime character 'Invader Zim', in reference to the invasion of the spider egg sacs that occurs when Odontacolus oviposit."	
Lycocerus evangelium Hsiao & Okushima, 2016	Soldier beetle	Neon Genesis Evangelion	"The specific epithet is derived from the Latin evangelium ('good news'), referring to [the] fact that its discovery was good news for the team; the specific name is also in memory of the anime 'Neon Genesis Evangelion', which is one of the greatest animes [sic] in Japanese history and had a strong impact on Japanese popular culture"	
Filistatinella chilindrina Magalhaes & Ramírez, 2017	Spider	La Chilindrina, El Chavo del Ocho	This species is native to Mexico.	
Elthusa xena van der Wal, 2019	Isopod	Xena, Xena: Warrior Princess	"This species is named after Xena, the warrior princess, in reference to the strong nature of the female cymothoid isopod."	
Salticus lucasi Zamani, Hosseini & Moradmand, 2020	Jumping spider	Lucas the Spider	"The species is named after Lucas the Spider, an animated character created by animator Josh Slice on the basis of the anatomy of jumping spiders, in recognition of the role that it played in "curing" many arachnophobes around the world".	
Ahaetulla farnsworthi Mallik et al., 2020	Snake	Professor Farnsworth, Futurama	"Dedicated to the physicist Dr. Hubert Farnsworth of the world of Futurama, for his efforts in resurrecting barking snakes from extinction."	
Coptoborus scully Smith & Cognato, 2021	Bark beetle	Dana Scully, The X-Files	The authors also highlighted the "Scully Effect"	
Trigonopterus unyil Narakusumo & Riedel, 2021	Weevil	Si Unyil	This species is endemic to Sulawesi, Indonesia	
Magnigryllacris tiga (Yin & Shen, 2021)	Leaf-rolling cricket	Ultraman Tiga	"This species is named after Ultraman Tiga, a character in the famous tokusatsu television series Ultraman. Species from genus Eugryllacris are always referred to as "Ultraman katydid" among katydid enthusiasts in China. They get this nickname because of their representative yellowish or reddish eyes. According to the Ultraman series, Tiga is the mysterious giant that wakes up from his petrified body and protects human beings. 2021 is the 25th anniversary of Tiga debuting, so we name this new species as Tiga in memory of the widely welcomed TV series Ultraman Tiga." This species was originally described as Eugryllacris tiga, and subsequently transferred to genus Magnigryllacris.	
Luthela asuka Wei & Lin, 2023	Spider	Asuka Langley Soryu, Neon Genesis Evangelion	"The specific epithet is from 'Asuka Langley Soryu', a fictional character wearing a red combat suit from the animation 'Evangelion' (by the Japanese creator Hideaki Anno), refers to the body color."	
Xangoniscus jonasi López-Orozco, Bichuette & Campos-Filho, 2024	Woodlouse	Jonas Kahnwald, Dark	A cave-dwelling species "named after Jonas Kahnwald, the protagonist of the "Dark" series, who explores caves to travel through time and space. The epithet "jonasi" is a tribute to the isolation and sense of separation from time and space that caves represent, evoking the central theme of "Dark". The species reflects extreme adaptation to dark depths, just as Jonas adapts to the complexities and paradoxes of time."	
Nitzschia nandorii Olszyński, Zakrzewski & Żelazna-Wieczorek, 2024	Diatom	Nandor the Relentless, What We Do in the Shadows (TV Series)	"The species name comes from the main character of the TV series "What We Do in the Shadows" Nandor the Relentless, and the name of the authors' cat"	
†Sociala borat Vršanský, 2024	Cockroach	Borat Sagdiyev	A fossil species from the Jurassic of Kazakhstan.	
Ceroptres swiperi Nastasi, Smith & Davis, 2024	Wasp	Swiper, Dora the Explorer	"Named for Swiper the Fox, the primary antagonist in the Nickelodeon animated series Dora the Explorer. Swiper's main role in the series is to attempt to steal crucial objects acquired by Dora and her colleagues during their adventures, just as inquiline gall wasps apparently take advantage of nutritive gall tissues intended for gall inducers' progeny."	
Commelina almandina M.Pell. & Cornejo, 2025	Flowering plant	Garnet, Steven Universe	"The epithet derives from the French word almandine, a corruption of the Medieval Latin words alamandīna and alabandīna, which were the names given to the deep to dark red types of garnets. This name is chosen in reference to the new species’ reddish-brown to dark maroon and gem-like fruits. The epithet also refers to the character Garnet from the Cartoon Network series Steven Universe, created by Rebecca Sugar."	
†Cretodorus noonoo Fabrikant, Fu & Davranoglou, 2026	Planthopper	Noo-Noo, Teletubbies	"The new species is named after the anthropomorphic vacuum cleaner character “Noo-Noo” appearing in the popular kids TV-show Teletubbies in reference to its similarly elongated and flexible mouthparts."	
Luzonogryllus appa Tan & Alo, 2026	Cricket	Appa, Avatar: The Last Airbender	"The species is named after the fictional sky bison, Appa, from the ‘Avatar The Last Airbender’ animated series. This is due to the resemblance of having a ventrad-pointing arrow-shaped stripe on their frons, pubescent and stripped body; noun in apposition."	

== Games ==
=== Galaga (1981) ===
Taxon	Type	Named for	Notes
†Galagadon nordquistae Gates et al., 2019	Carpet shark	Galaga	"[N]amed for the shape of the teeth, which when seen in different views resemble the spaceships in the arcade game 'Galaga'"
Taito galaga Kury & Barros, 2014	Harvestman	Galaga	Named in reference to "the shape of the alien insectoids which resemble the butterfly-shaped equuleus of this species".

=== Mario (1981–present) ===
Taxon	Type	Named for	Notes	Ref
†Rotundicardia mariobrosorum Pé & del Río, 2017	Bivalve	Mario and Luigi, the "Mario Bros."	"The specific epithet honors Mario and Luigi, the Mario Bros. brothers, main characters from the popular videogame Mario Bros., in which they collect mushrooms, and it is a reference to the 'funginate' nodes of the radial ribs in this species."	
Maraenobiotus supermario Novikov & Sharafutdinova, 2020	Copepod	Mario	"This species is named after the character of the video game Super Mario, who, like our species, goes often underground and wears a funny mustache (mandibular palp)."	

=== The Legend of Zelda (1986–present) ===
Taxon	Type	Named for	Notes	Ref
Epicratinus zelda Gonçalves & Brescovit, 2020	Spider	Princess Zelda	"Princess Zelda is the titular character in Nintendo's The Legend of Zelda video game series. [...] The shape of the epigynum remembers the Hyrule's symbol."	
Lanayrella Salvador & Cunha, 2020	Sea snail	Lanayru Sea	"Named after the Lanayru Sea from the game 'The Legend of Zelda: Breath of the Wild'"	
Orcevia yahaha Yu, Maddison & Zhang, 2023	Spider	Koroks	"The specific epithet is a noun in apposition from 'Yahaha' (also known as 'Korok'), a very cute pixie in the game The Legend of Zelda: Breath of the Wild. Yahaha often hide in tree trunks, bushlands, or rocks, and if you find them, they will say 'Yahaha!' and share with you some 'fruits' as a gift. Collecting Orcevia specimens is very like searching for Yahaha."	
Orcevia bokoblin Yu, Maddison & Zhang, 2023	Spider	Bokoblins	"The specific epithet is from 'Bokoblin', a small piggy monster in the game The Legend of Zelda: Breath of the Wild, developed and published by Nintendo. In the Master Mode of this game, Bokoblin commonly has either silver or gold coloration, corresponding to two color-forms observed in the males of the new species."	

=== Street Fighter (1987–present) ===
Taxon	Type	Named for	Notes	Ref
Epicratinus ehonda Gonçalves & Brescovit, 2020	Spider	E. Honda	"The specific epithet is a noun taken in apposition and is in reference to Edmond Honda, a fictional character in Street Fighter series game from CAPCOM. E. Honda is a Japanese sumo wrestler, and the epigynum resembles two sumo wrestlers in fighting position."	
Epicratinus zangief Gonçalves & Brescovit, 2020	Spider	Zangief	"The specific epithet is a noun taken in apposition and is in reference to Zangief, a fictional character in Street Fighter series game from CAPCOM. Zangief is a soviet strongman, and the RTA resembles a sickle, present in old USSR flag."	

=== Pokémon (1996–present) ===
Taxon	Type	Named for	Notes	Ref
Stentorceps weedlei Neilson & Buffington, 2011	Wasp	Weedle	"Weedle shares the distinguishing character of S. weedlei, a spine in the middle of its head."	
†Aerodactylus Vidovic & Martill, 2014	Pterosaur	Aerodactyl	"The name derives from the Nintendo Pokémon Aerodactyl, a fantasy creature made up of a combination of different pterosaurian features"	
Chilicola charizard Monckton, 2016	Bee	Charizard	"The specific epithet is in homage to the fictional monster which this species resembles"	
†Bulbasaurus phylloxyron Kammerer & Smith, 2017	Dicynodont	Bulbasaur	"Bulbasaurus (bulb lizard) refers to the bulbous nasal boss and the species phylloxyron (leaf razor) refers to the sharpened beak for slicing through the plant material it ate [...] similarities between this species and certain other squat, tusked quadrupeds may not be entirely coincidental."	
Dicranocentrus pikachu Xisto & Cleide de Mendonça, 2017	Springtail	Pikachu		
Parapharyngodon politoedi Santos et al., 2019	Roundworm	Politoed	A parasite of the Manaus slender-legged tree frog; "The species epithet is derived from the fictional character named 'Politoed', a frog-type Pokémon from the Pokémon Universe."	
Binburrum articuno Hsiao & Pollock, 2020	Beetle	Articuno		
Binburrum zapdos Hsiao & Pollock, 2020	Beetle	Zapdos		
Binburrum moltres Hsiao & Pollock, 2020	Beetle	Moltres		
Epicratinus pikachu Gonçalves & Brescovit, 2020	Spider	Pikachu	"The female epigynum resembles the face of Pikachu."	
Rathalos treecko Lin & Li, 2021	Spider	Treecko	"The species is named after Treecko, a fictional character from Pokémon Emerald that lives in the forest, as does this new species". Originally described as Anyphaena treecko and subsequently transferred to genus Rathalos.	
Anyphaena grovyle Lin & Li, 2021	Spider	Grovyle	"The species is named after Grovyle, a fictional character from Pokémon Emerald that lives in the forest, as does the new species"	
Anyphaena sceptile Lin & Li, 2021	Spider	Sceptile	"The species is named after Sceptile, a fictional character from Pokémon Emerald who lives in the forest, as does this new species"	
Alistra pikachu Lin & Li, 2021	Spider	Pikachu	"The species is named after Pikachu, a fictional character from Pokémon Yellow, as the habitus color of this new species is yellow"	
Hiperantha pikachu Pineda & Barros, 2021	Beetle	Pikachu	"The specific name is a homage to Pikachu, a fictional monster which this species resembles in its yellow elytra with a black apical band (like the ears of Pikachu)."	
Nocticola pheromosa Lucañas & Foo, 2023	Cockroach	Pheromosa	"There are some similarities between Pheromosa and the delicate cockroach [...] found, such as having a long antenna, wings that mimic a hood and long slender legs."	
Phrynarachne dreepy Lin & S. Li, 2022	Spider	Dreepy	"The species is named after Dreepy, a fictional character from Pokémon Sword and Shield, who has a triangular head that is reminiscent of the opisthosoma of the new species."	

=== Monster Hunter (2004–present) ===
Taxon	Type	Named for	Notes	Ref
Lagiacrusichthys Davis, 2015	Pearleye	Lagiacrus	"named for a wyvern, a dragon-like creature, specifically the sea-wyvern Lagiacrus (made famous by Monster Hunter), known for his fierceness and for inhabiting the deep. [...] both are rather ferocious coldwater predators"	
Rathalos Lin & Li, 2021	Spider	Rathalos	While the authors stated in the paper that this genus name was "an arbitrary combination of letters", the lead author subsequently admitted the link to Monster Hunter in a tweet.	
Otacilia khezu Lin & Li, 2024	Spider	Khezu	"The species is named after khezu; a kind of blind flying wyvern first appearing in Monster Hunter, noun in apposition."	

=== BioShock (2007–present) ===
Taxon	Type	Named for	Notes	Ref
Rapturella ryani Salvador & Cunha, 2016	Gastropod	Rapture and Andrew Ryan	"In honour of Andrew Ryan, the founder of the deep-sea city Rapture, from the science-fiction video game series BioShock."	
Rapturella atlas Cunha & Simone, 2018	Gastropod	Rapture and Frank "Atlas" Fontaine	"In honors of Atlas, the nick name of Frank Fontaine, the character of the science-fiction video game series BioShock: an allusion to the hidden identity of the species."	

=== Drakengard and Nier (2013-present) ===
Taxon	Type	Named for	Notes	Ref
Perinereis nieri Teixeira et al., 2025	Polychaete worm	Nier, Nier	"The new species name is based on the main protagonist, “Nier” (male replicant), from Nier Replicant, directed by the brilliant mind of Yoko Taro, and one of the favourite video game franchises of the first author."	
Perinereis twobae Teixeira et al., 2025	Polychaete worm	2B, Nier: Automata	"The new species name is based on the main protagonist from one of the favourite video games of the first author. MOTU 3 is named after “2B” (female android) from Nier Automata, directed by Yoko Taro."	

=== Elden Ring (2022) ===
Taxon	Type	Named for	Notes	Ref
Perinereis maleniae Teixeira et al., 2025	Polychaete worm	Malenia	"The new species name is based on the lore from one of the favourite video games of the first author. The twin demigods “Malenia” (younger sister) and “Miquella” (elder brother) were Empyreans based on the narrative from Elden Ring directed by Hidetaka Miyazaki, meaning they had the potential to one day replace their mother as a new god of a coming age."	
Perinereis miquellai Teixeira et al., 2025	Polychaete worm	Miquella	"The new species name is based on the lore from one of the favourite video games of the first author. The twin demigods “Malenia” (younger sister) and “Miquella” (elder brother) were Empyreans based on the narrative from Elden Ring directed by Hidetaka Miyazaki, meaning they had the potential to one day replace their mother as a new god of a coming age."	
Spiricoelotes metyr Chen, Liu & Wei, 2025	Spider	Metyr	"The species name is derived from “Metyr”, a character in the myth of Elden Ring, written by George R.R. Martin. Metyr is depicted as having a massive, finger-shaped body and living in an underground cave; this name refers to the shape of the spermathecae and the habitat of this new species."	

=== Other games ===
Taxon	Type	Named for	Notes	Ref
†Cortana Salvador & Simone, 2013	Gastropod	Cortana, Halo	"The name was taken from a character of the science fiction franchise 'Halo', and alludes to the convoluted markings on the shell surface of the holotype of Cortana carvalhoi"	
†Crash bandicoot Travouillon et al., 2014	Bandicoot	Crash Bandicoot, Crash Bandicoot	Named after Crash Bandicoot to allude to the "inference that this was the start of a new radiation of more modern bandicoots that 'crashed' through to dominate younger, drier ecosystems of Australia."	
Halystina umberlee Salvador, Cavallari & Simone, 2014	Gastropod	Umberlee, Dungeons & Dragons, Forgotten Realms	"[N]amed after Umberlee, a fictional goddess of the deep sea from the Faerûnian pantheon of the Forgotten Realms campaign setting of the Dungeons & Dragons role-playing game."	
Taito spaceinvaders Kury & Barros, 2014	Harvestman	Space Invaders	"Space Invaders (Japanese Supûsu Inbêdâ) is an arcade video game manufactured and sold by Taito and very successful and popular worldwide in the 1980s."	
Neobuthus factorio Kovařík, Lowe, Awale, Elmi, & Hurre, 2018	Scorpion	Factorio	Named after the video game Factorio, which was created by Michal Kovařík, the son of one of the researchers who described the species, František Kovařík.	
Demyrsus digmon Hsiao & Oberprieler, 2020	Weevil	Digimon, Digimon Adventure 02	Named after the insectoid Digmon, "who possesses the great power of drilling and manipulating the earth, in reference to the habit of this species, which can bore into hard trunk of cycads."	
Epicratinus mauru Gonçalves & Brescovit, 2020	Spider	Mauru, Waku Waku 7	"The specific epithet is a noun taken in apposition and is in reference to Mauru, a fictional character in Waku Waku Seven, game from SUNSOFT for Neo Geo, which is the non-threatening guardian of Lost Forest."	
Epicratinus omegarugal Gonçalves & Brescovit, 2020	Spider	Omega Rugal, The King of Fighters	"The specific epithet is a noun taken in apposition and is in reference to Omega Rugal, a fictional character in The King of Fighters series game from SNK, which is the boss on the first game and a recurrent character on this series, the epigynum looks like an Omega letter, from Greek alphabet."	
Euconnus hosakae Hoshina, Fukutomi, & Watanabe, 2020	Rove beetle	Miyuki Hosaka, Sentimental Graffiti	The type specimen and Miyuki Hosaka are both from Kanazawa.	
Emphysemastix frampt Olsen & Enghoff, 2020	Millipede	Kingseeker Frampt, Dark Souls	Named after Kingseeker Frampt from the 2011 video game Dark Souls due to the gonopods' resemblance to the character	
Abaddon despoliator Derkarabetian, 2021	Harvestman	Abaddon the Despoiler, Warhammer 40,000	Named after Abaddon the Despoiler, who is "typically portrayed adorned with spikes and various sharp things"	
Gothus teemo Yuan, Jiang, and Sha, 2024	Crab	Teemo, League of Legends	Named after the League of Legends champion Teemo, in reference to the crab's pale body with brown stripes and dense covering of setae resembling Teemo's brown and white fur coat.	
Epicratinus baraka Gonçalves & Brescovit, 2024	Spider	Baraka, Mortal Kombat	"Baraka features a set of long metal blades that retract into his forearms, resembling the retrolateral apophysis with constricted base on the palpal patella of the male"	
Epicratinus raiden Gonçalves & Brescovit, 2024	Spider	Raiden, Mortal Kombat	"Raiden is of "truth and light" and protector of Earthrealm, wearing light clothing, resembles the trochanter and part of the femurs of the male."	
Ceroptres sandiegoae Nastasi, Smith & Davis, 2024	Wasp	Carmen Sandiego, Carmen Sandiego	"Named for Carmen Sandiego, the titular character of a variety of video games, television series, and other media. Sandiego plays the role of an extremely intelligent master thief and detective, among others."	
†Paarthurnax Platt, Adams & Brochu, 2025	Crocodyliform	Paarthunax, The Elder Scrolls V: Skyrim	"[Named] after a dragon of The Elder Scrolls V: Skyrim role playing game developed by Bethesda Game Studios."	
Lepidepecreum myla Wróblewski & Jażdżewska, 2026	Amphipod	Myla, Hollow Knight	"This species is named for Myla, the character from the computer video game Hollow Knight. The representatives of the described species, like Myla, are just little arthropods trying to survive in total darkness."	

== Other media ==
Taxon	Type	Named for	Notes	Ref
Zygonemertes cocacola Corrêa, 1961	Worm	Coca-Cola	"This species is named coca cola for the well known soft drink which I enjoyed so much during my stay in the United States and which made my daily work so much more refreshing."	
Oxybelus cocacolae Verhoeff, 1968	Wasp	Coca-Cola	"The site where I made my discovery was an irrigated garden in the dunes; the specimens were collected on umbels (likely Daucus) and on the ground. It was hot, and we drank Coca-Cola to quench our thirst. I am naming the new species: cocacolae."	
†Roberthoffstetteria nationalgeographica Marshall, de Muizon & Sigé, 1983	Metatherian	National Geographic Society	"[Named] for the National Geographic Society which sponsored the field work and made the discovery of this animal possible.	
Orsonwelles bellum Hormiga, 2002	Spider	The War of the Worlds (1938 radio drama)	"This species, collected below the radio tower on Mount Kahili, is named after Orson Welles' 1938 radio broadcast of H. G. Wells' War of the Worlds. Bellum (war) is a Latin noun in apposition."	
Proceratium google Fisher, 2002	Ant	Google	"Named in recognition of the support from the Google company."	
Plecturocebus aureipalatii Wallace, Gómez, A. M. Felton, & A. Felton, 2006	Titi monkey	GoldenPalace.com	"This species is named...in recognition of a major financial contribution from GoldenPalace.com to FUNDESNAP (Foundation for the Development of the National Protected Area System)."	
Drizztius geminensis Edwards, 2015	Spider	Drizzt Do'Urden	"Named after the R.A. Salvatore fictional character Drizzt Do’Urden, who is famed for his skill with a pair of swords."	
Loncovilius carlsbergi Reyes-Hernández, Hansen, Jenkins Shaw & Solodovnikov, 2015	Rove beetle	Carlsberg	"The species epithet is in honour of the Denmark-based Carlsberg beer brewery, whose generous grants and beverages have facilitated much research in the Solodovnikov Lab. In addition, the male aedeagus resembles a bottle opener."	
Metallactus londonpridei Sassi, 2018	Leaf beetle	London Pride	"Dedicated to the excellent beer which inspired some lovely evening meditations during the visits of the author at BMNH."	
Tobleronius Fernandez-Triana & Boudreault, 2018	Wasp	Toblerone	"The name refers to the chocolate brand “Toblerone”, one of the favourites of the first author."	
Sathon oreo Fagan-Jeffries, Cooper & Austin, 2019	Wasp	Oreo	"This species is named for the brown antenna with a thick white stripe caused by the white flagellomeres 6–7 resembling the brown-white-brown colouration pattern of the Oreo cream-centred chocolate biscuits."	
Opaluma ednae Lessard & Woodley, 2020	Fly	Dame Edna Everage	A purple-coloured soldier fly from Australia, named "in honour of the comical character Dame Edna Everage whose signature hair has a striking resemblance to the colouration of this species."	
Troglomyces twitteri Reboleira, Santamaria & Enghoff, 2020	Fungi	Twitter	"Named after the social media platform Twitter, where it was observed for the first time."	
Ameronothrus twitter Pfingstl et al., 2021	Orbitad mite	Twitter	"The specific name ‘twitter’ refers to the social media platform, Twitter on which this species was spotted for the first time ever."	
Ameronothrus retweet Pfingstl et al., 2022	Orbitad mite	Twitter	"The specific name ‘retweet’ is given as noun in apposition. "Retweet" is used as both a verb and noun on the social media application Twitter and means repost or forward a message. The present work does not represent a direct act of retweeting in a strict sense, but the species was discovered by a post as a response to the message about the discovery of A. twitter."	
Chrysosoma bitcoin Bickel & Martin, 2022	Fly	Bitcoin	"This species is named bitcoin in recognition of a donation by one of the Australian Museum’s supporters. This may be the first time a cryptocurrency donation has been used to support biodiversity discovery."	
Bacteriophage Djungelskog Oliveros et al., 2024	Bacteriophage	Djungelskog	"SharkoochyBord was rejected as a name, so we changed it to Djungelskog because the ikea bear is very cute."	
Braunsia hodorii Kang, 2024	Wasp	Hodori	A braconid wasp from South Korea, "named after "Hodori", the male tiger mascot of the Seoul Olympic games in 1988 due to similarity in the color patterns (orange and with black stripes) [...]. Additionally, the long antennae resemble Hodori's distinctive hat streamer."	
Hotwheels sisyphus Liu & Zhang, 2024	Spider	Hot Wheels	"The generic name refers to Hot Wheels, a collectible die-cast toy car made by Mattel, as the long, coiled embolus of this new genus resembles a Hot Wheels track; neuter in gender."	
Hexura vandal Calatayud-Mascarell, Briggs & Hamilton, 2026	Spider	Idaho Vandals	"The name honors the [University of Idaho], which provided partial funding for this study, and represents how the University of Idaho is the “gem” of the Gem State’s higher education system."	

== See also ==
- List of unusual biological names
- List of organisms named after famous people
