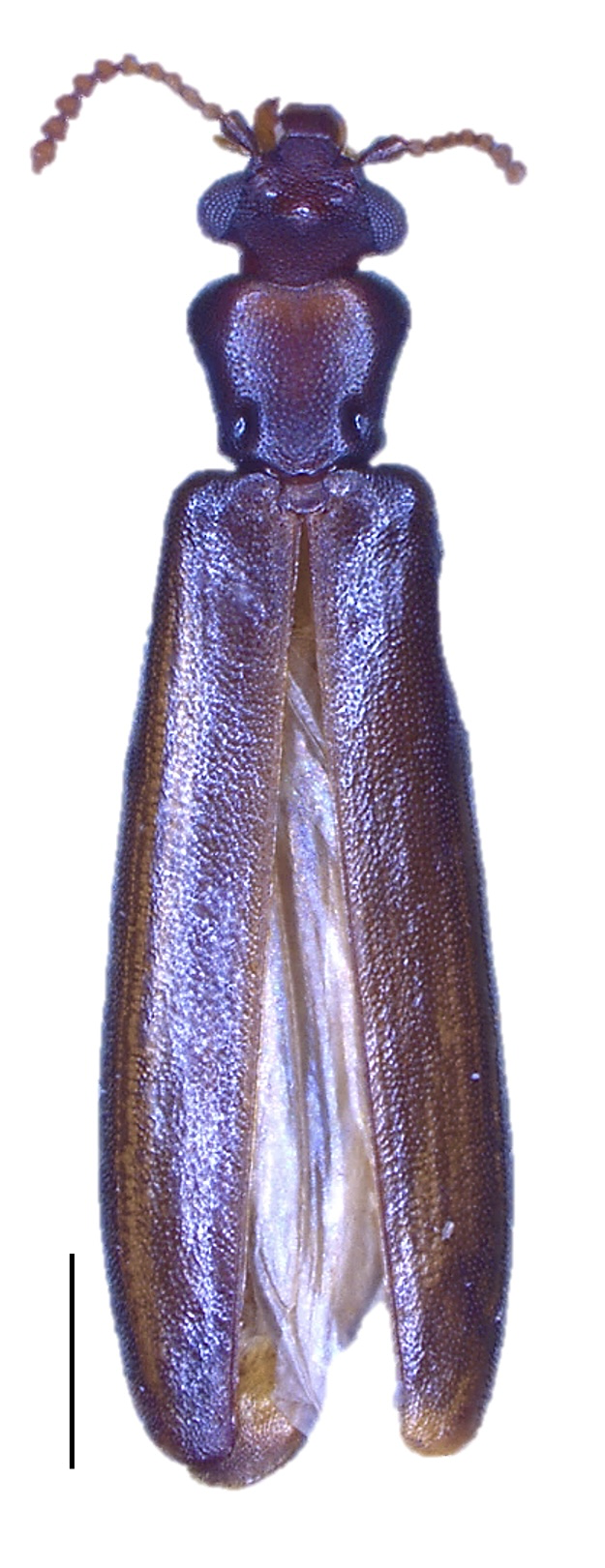
- Dorsal habitus of the holotype, scale bar = 1 mm

Scientific classification
- Kingdom: Animalia
- Phylum: Arthropoda
- Clade: Pancrustacea
- Class: Insecta
- Order: Coleoptera
- Suborder: Polyphaga
- Infraorder: Cucujiformia
- Family: Mycteridae
- Genus: Hemipeplus
- Species: H. anishae

Binomial name
- Hemipeplus anishae KC & Pollock, 2025

= Hemipeplus anishae =

Species of beetle

Hemipeplus anishae is a species of beetle in the family Mycteridae, and subfamily Hemipeplinae. The species is known from Belize, specifically the Cayo district, where it was collected at the Las Cuevas Research Station at an elevation of 550 m (1,800 ft).

== Taxonomy ==
The species was described in 2025 by KC & Pollock, with the type material consisting of a holotype (female) and one paratype (female). The specific name, anishae, was given in honour of Anisha Sapkota, the wife of the first author.

== Description ==
Hemipeplus anishae is characterized by its dark, shiny appearance and the absence of temples, which is a distinctive feature of this species. The scape is elongate, and the eyes are large, wide, and strongly convex, about the same length as the combined scape and pedicel. The pronotum is subcordiform with a deep anterior emargination, and its lateral margins are sinuate with the anterolateral angles broadly rounded. The elytra are elongate, more or less flat, and rufopiceous in color, with an overall shiny appearance. The ventral surface of the beetle is similarly rufopiceous, with hypomera piceous, and the legs are the same colour as the body, with lighter tarsi.

== Distribution ==
Hemipeplus anishae is currently known only from Belize (Cayo district), where it was collected in the Las Cuevas Research Station area.
