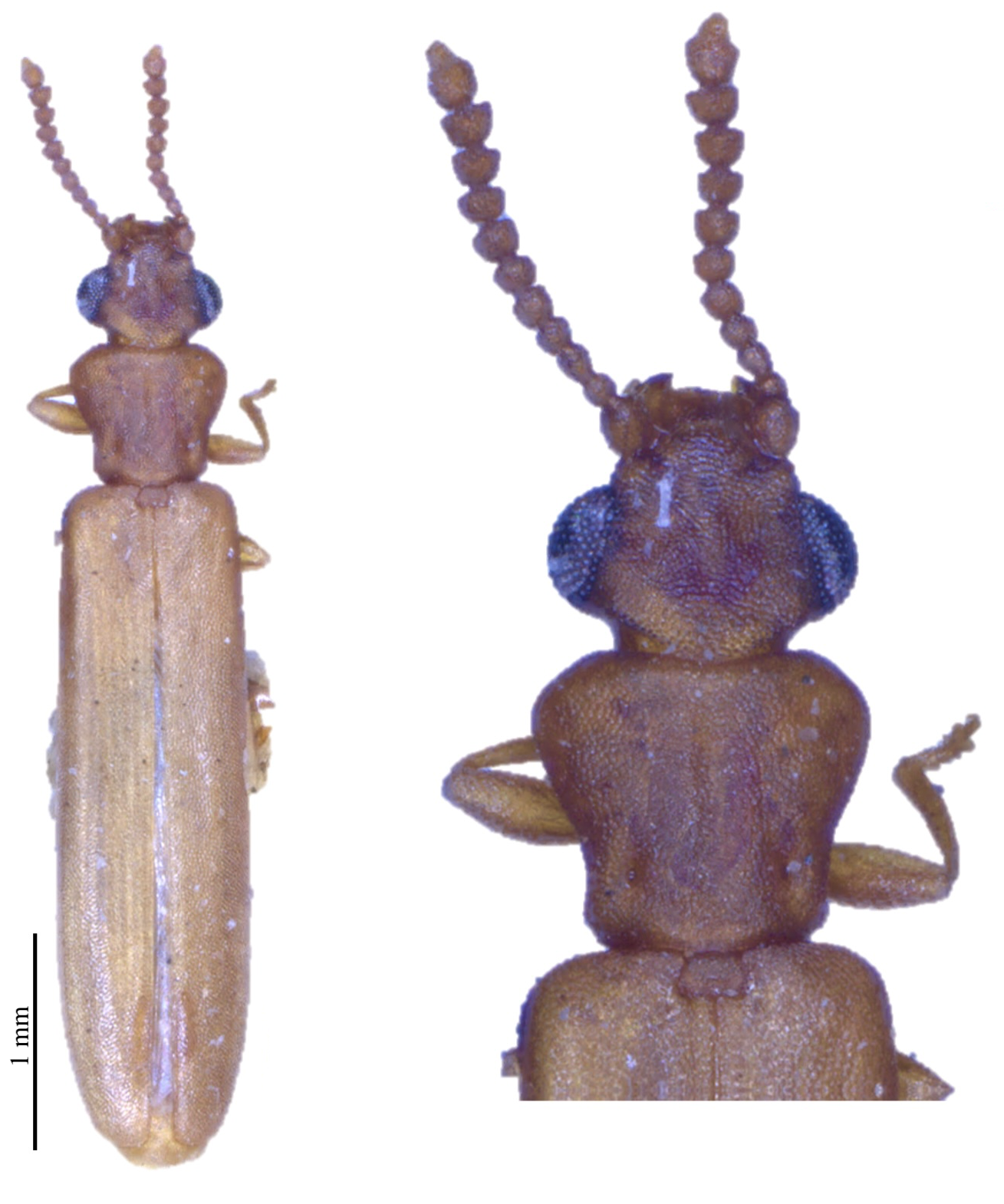
- Dorsal habitus of the holotype, scale bar = 1 mm

Scientific classification
- Kingdom: Animalia
- Phylum: Arthropoda
- Clade: Pancrustacea
- Class: Insecta
- Order: Coleoptera
- Suborder: Polyphaga
- Infraorder: Cucujiformia
- Family: Mycteridae
- Genus: Hemipeplus
- Species: H. harkoneni

Binomial name
- Hemipeplus harkoneni KC & Pollock, 2025

= Hemipeplus harkoneni =

Species of beetle

Hemipeplus harkoneni is a species of beetle in the family Mycteridae, subfamily Hemipeplinae. The species is known from several islands in the Philippines, including Luzon, Mindoro, and Leyte and Malaysia (Sarawak), where it has been collected from Cocos nucifera, Nypa fruticans and light traps.

== Taxonomy ==
The species was described in 2025 by KC & Pollock, with the type material consisting of a holotype (male) and 24 paratype specimens. The specific name harkoneni was given in honor of the first author's late friend from Finland, Reijo Härkönen, who supported the research during its early phases.

== Description ==
Hemipeplus harkoneni is characterized by large, wide, and convex compound eyes that are longer than the combined length of the scape and pedicel. The temples are absent, and the pronotum is wide with a moderately prominent pronotal pad. The body is relatively wide, with slightly flat and elongate elytra. The color varies from pale to deeper brown, with a distinctive rufous apical patch on the elytra. The pronotal angles are rounded, and the posterior lobe is truncate without a median notch.

== Distribution ==
Hemipeplus harkoneni is found in the Philippines, particularly in areas like Luzon, Mindoro, Leyte, and surrounding islands, and in Malaysia (Sarawak). It has been collected from Cocos nucifera, Nypa fruticans and light traps in these regions.
