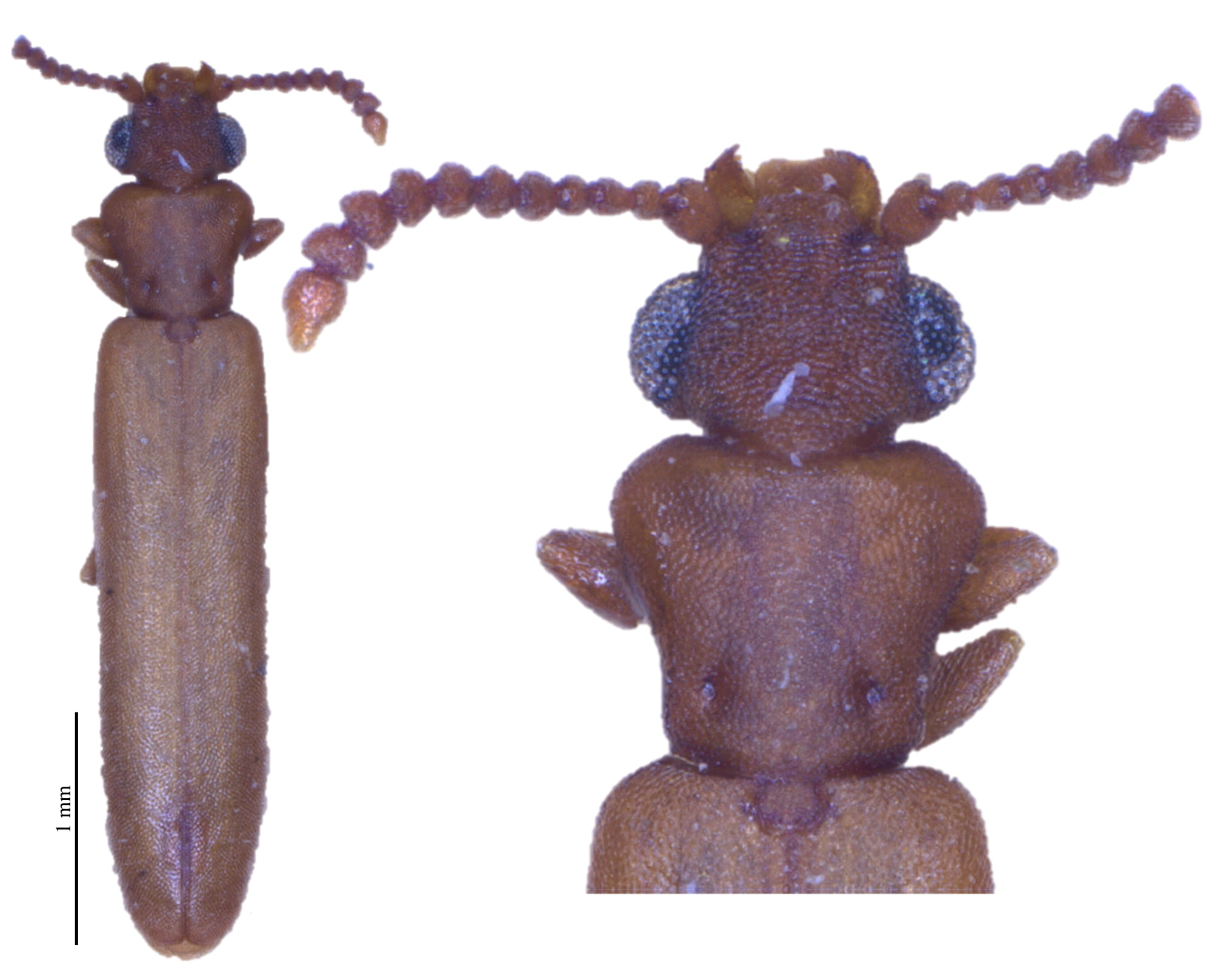
- Dorsal habitus of the holotype

Scientific classification
- Kingdom: Animalia
- Phylum: Arthropoda
- Clade: Pancrustacea
- Class: Insecta
- Order: Coleoptera
- Suborder: Polyphaga
- Infraorder: Cucujiformia
- Family: Mycteridae
- Genus: Hemipeplus
- Species: H. joerebeccae

Binomial name
- Hemipeplus joerebeccae KC & Pollock, 2025

= Hemipeplus joerebeccae =

Species of beetle

Hemipeplus joerebeccae is a species of beetle in the family Mycteridae, subfamily Hemipeplinae. The species is known from the Philippines, specifically from the islands of Luzon, Mindanao (Surigao), Mindoro, and Negros, where it was collected in various localities.

== Taxonomy ==
The species was described in 2025 by KC & Pollock, with the type material consisting of a holotype (male) and 36 paratype specimens. The specific name joerebeccae was given in honor of Joe Schelling and Mary Rebecca Gracey who are avid butterfly and bird naturalists from Albuquerque, New Mexico.

== Description ==
Hemipeplus joerebeccae is characterized by its large, wide, and convex eyes, which are as long as the combined length of the scape, pedicel, and antennomere III. The temples are extremely short, sometimes angulate, and in some specimens, indistinguishable. The pronotum is narrower and darker compared to closely related Hemipeplus luzonensis. The scape is moniliform and dilated apically, and the pronotal pad is distinct but narrow. The elytra are elongate, slightly convex, and have a rufous coloration with a darker apical patch.

== Distribution ==
Hemipeplus joerebeccae is found exclusively in the Philippines, particularly on the islands of Luzon, Mindanao (Surigao), Mindoro, and Negros, where it has been collected from light traps.
