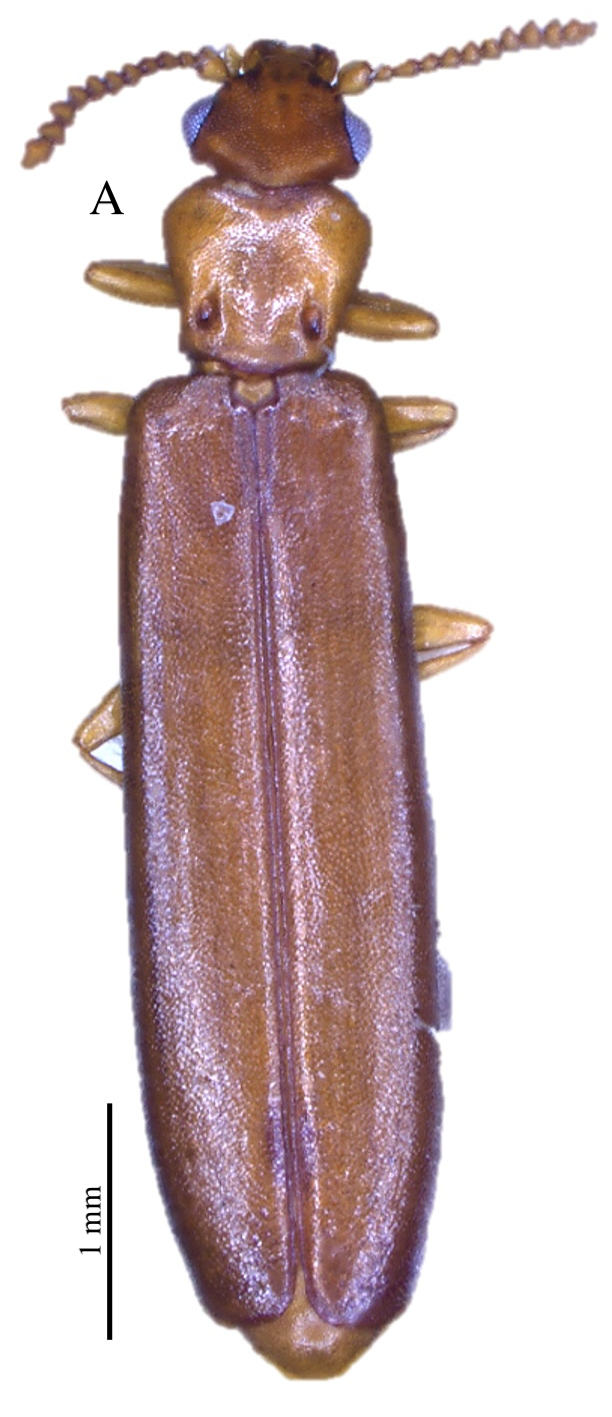
- Dorsal habitus of the holotype, scale bar = 1 mm

Scientific classification
- Kingdom: Animalia
- Phylum: Arthropoda
- Clade: Pancrustacea
- Class: Insecta
- Order: Coleoptera
- Suborder: Polyphaga
- Infraorder: Cucujiformia
- Family: Mycteridae
- Genus: Hemipeplus
- Species: H. pollocki

Binomial name
- Hemipeplus pollocki KC, 2025

= Hemipeplus pollocki =

Species of beetle

Hemipeplus pollocki is a species of beetle in the family Mycteridae, subfamily Hemipeplinae. The species is known from Mexico, specifically the Sonora region, where it was collected at Nácori Chico at an elevation of 780m.

== Taxonomy ==
The species was described in 2025 by KC, with the type material consisting of a holotype (male) and several paratype specimens. The specific name pollocki was given in honor of Darren A. Pollock, who contributed to the study of the Hemipeplinae subfamily.

== Description ==
Hemipeplus pollocki is characterized by its shiny rufous coloration and broad round temples. The scape is submoniliform and dilated apically, while the antennae are shorter than the combined length of the head and pronotum. The pronotum is subcordiform with a deep anterior emargination, and the elytra are elongate, flat, and rufous with a darker apical patch.

== Distribution ==
Hemipeplus pollocki is known exclusively from the Sonora region of Mexico, particularly around Nácori Chico and Yécora, where it was collected in association with Sabal uresana leaves.
