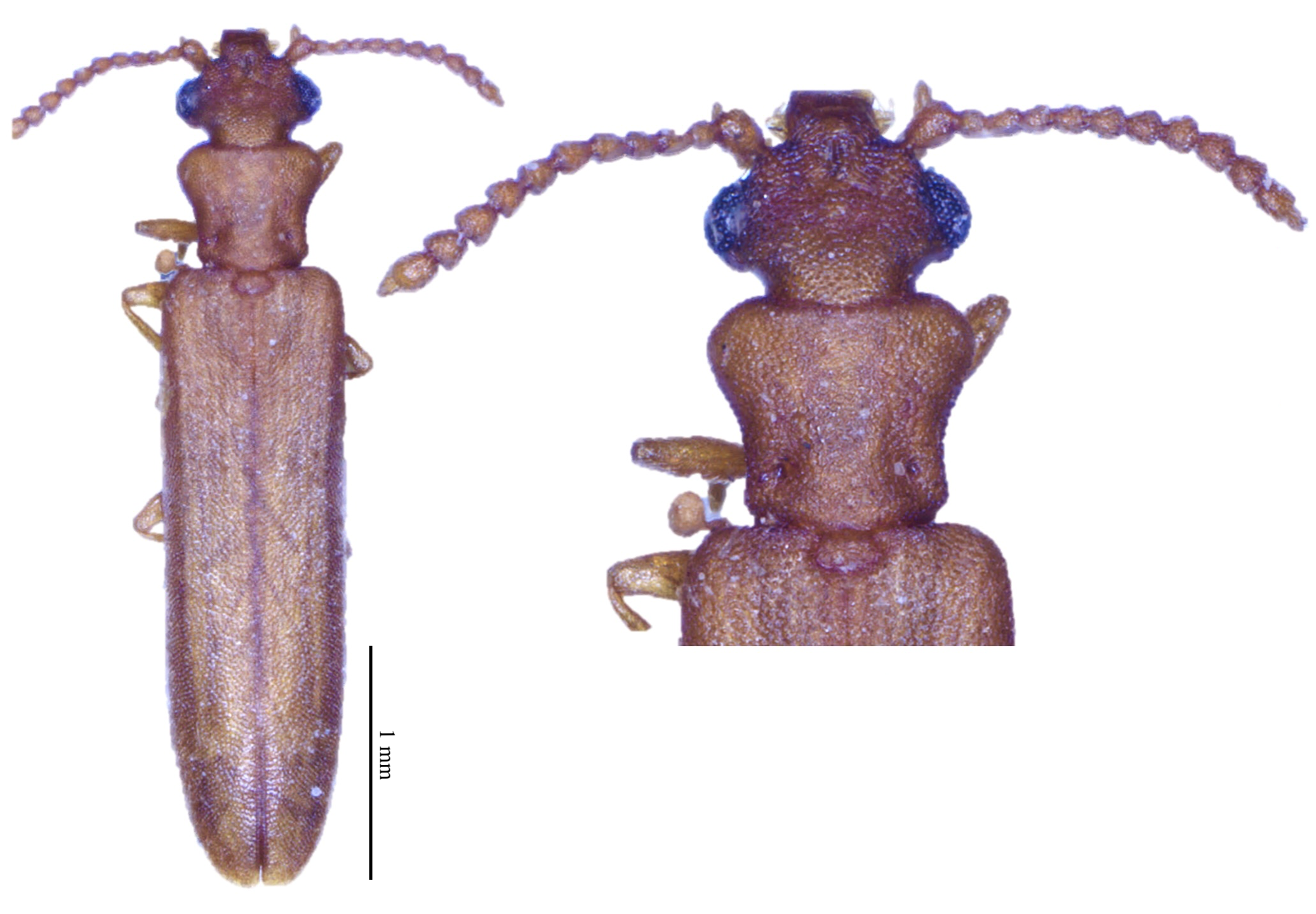
- Dorsal habitus of the holotype, scale bar = 1 mm

Scientific classification
- Kingdom: Animalia
- Phylum: Arthropoda
- Clade: Pancrustacea
- Class: Insecta
- Order: Coleoptera
- Suborder: Polyphaga
- Infraorder: Cucujiformia
- Family: Mycteridae
- Genus: Hemipeplus
- Species: H. craigi

Binomial name
- Hemipeplus craigi KC & Pollock, 2025

= Hemipeplus craigi =

Species of beetle

Hemipeplus craigi is a species of beetle in the family Mycteridae, subfamily Hemipeplinae. This species is found in Papua New Guinea and the nearby islands of New Britain and New Ireland, with specimens collected from various locations including Keravat and Bulolo. It is also found in Papua Province of Indonesia in Jayapura.

== Taxonomy ==
The species was described in 2025 by KC & Pollock. The type material includes a holotype (male), an allotype (female), and 9 paratype specimens. The specific name craigi honors the first author's longtime friend, Craig Winzelberg, from the USA.

== Description ==
Hemipeplus craigi is characterized by its dull, uniformly rufous color and moderately large eyes. The body is elongated, with a slight convexity to the elytra. The pronotum is subcordiform with moderately rounded anterior angles, and the scutellar shield is transverse and subhexagonal. The male genitalia feature a short and moderately slender lobe of basale with distinct suture, and the parameres are arcuate near the apices.

== Distribution ==
Hemipeplus craigi is found in the following regions: Indonesia in Papua, Papua New Guinea in Bulolo, New Britain (Keravat), and New Ireland. Specimens have been collected at elevations ranging from 60 m to 1005 m.
