= Hemipeplus marginipennis =

Scientific classification
- Kingdom: Animalia
- Phylum: Arthropoda
- Clade: Pancrustacea
- Class: Insecta
- Order: Coleoptera
- Suborder: Polyphaga
- Infraorder: Cucujiformia
- Family: Mycteridae
- Genus: Hemipeplus
- Species: H. marginipennis

Binomial name
- Hemipeplus marginipennis (LeConte, 1853 )

Species of beetle

Hemipeplus marginipennis is a species of beetle in the family Mycteridae. It is found in the Caribbean Sea, Central America (Mexico), and North America. It was proposed as a junior synonym of Hemipeplus hemipterus Lacordaire, 1854 by KC and Pollock in 2025.
