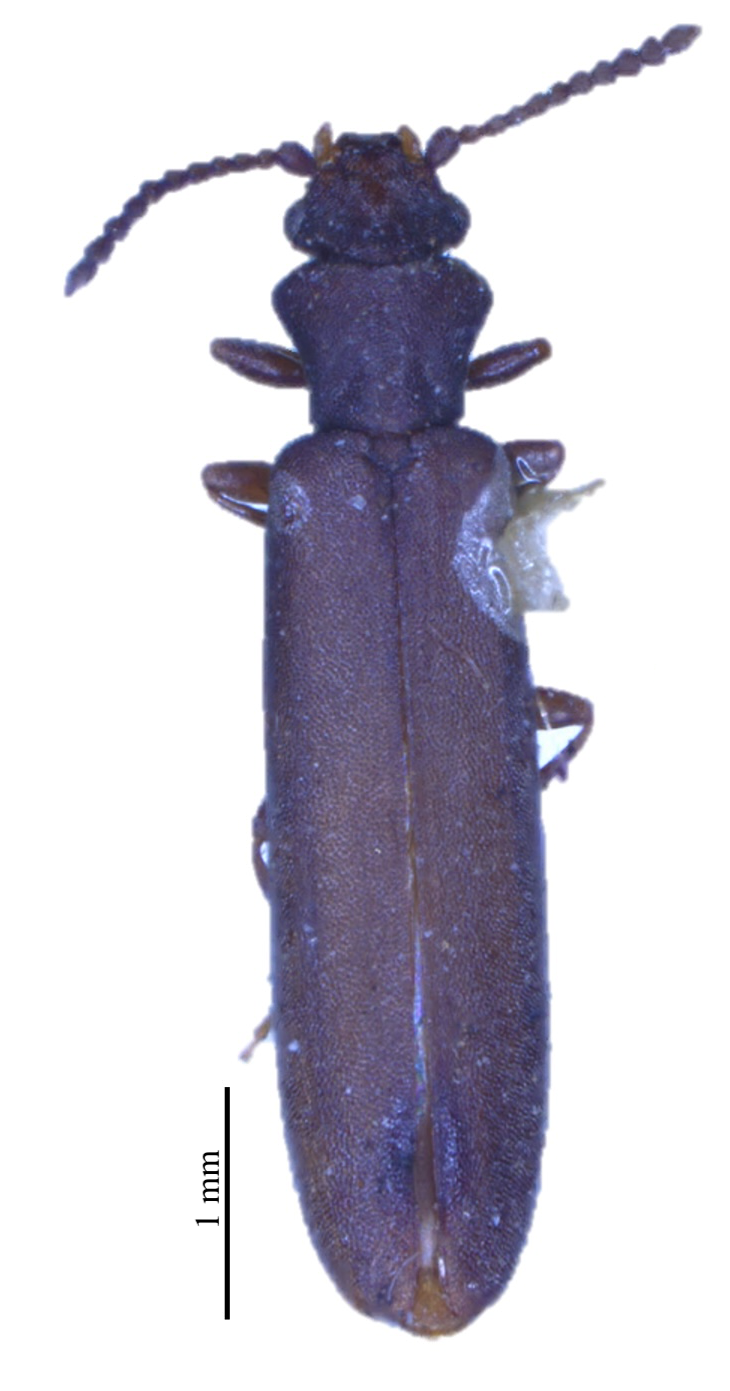
- Dorsal habitus of the holotype, scale bar = 1 mm

Scientific classification
- Kingdom: Animalia
- Phylum: Arthropoda
- Clade: Pancrustacea
- Class: Insecta
- Order: Coleoptera
- Suborder: Polyphaga
- Infraorder: Cucujiformia
- Family: Mycteridae
- Genus: Hemipeplus
- Species: H. heisenbergi

Binomial name
- Hemipeplus heisenbergi KC & Pollock, 2025

= Hemipeplus heisenbergi =

Species of beetle

Hemipeplus heisenbergi is a species of beetle in the family Mycteridae, subfamily Hemipeplinae. The species is known from New Guinea, specifically the Eastern Highlands Province, where it was collected at an elevation of 1600 m near Nondugl.

== Taxonomy ==
The species was described in 2025 by KC and Pollock, with the type material consisting of a holotype (male) and several paratype specimens. The specific name heisenbergi is derived from the alias 'Heisenberg', a reference to the fictional character Walter White from the TV series Breaking Bad.

== Description ==
Hemipeplus heisenbergi is characterized by its rufous to rufopiceous coloration, small eyes, and broad, round temples. The scape is submoniliform, dilated apically, and the antennae are shorter than the combined length of the head and pronotum. The pronotum is subcordiform with a deep anterior emargination, and the elytra are elongate and flat with a darker apical patch.

== Distribution ==
Hemipeplus heisenbergi is widespread in New Guinea from east to west.
