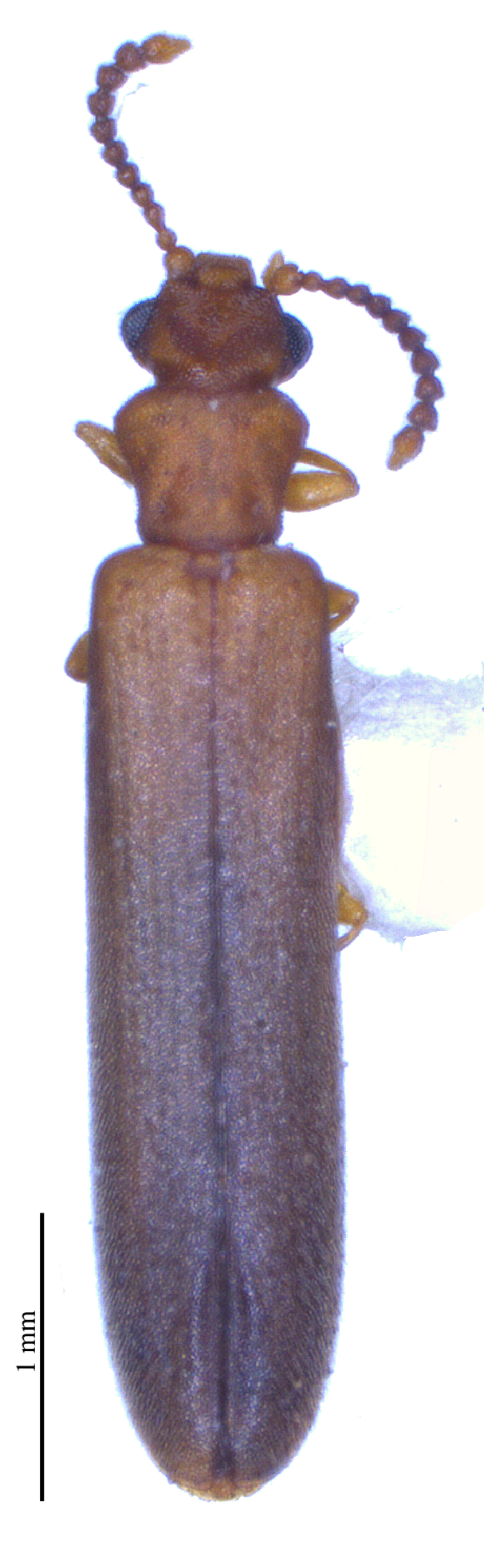
- Dorsal habitus of the holotype, scale bar = 1 mm

Scientific classification
- Kingdom: Animalia
- Phylum: Arthropoda
- Clade: Pancrustacea
- Class: Insecta
- Order: Coleoptera
- Suborder: Polyphaga
- Infraorder: Cucujiformia
- Family: Mycteridae
- Genus: Hemipeplus
- Species: H. saymyname

Binomial name
- Hemipeplus saymyname KC & Pollock, 2025

= Hemipeplus saymyname =

Species of beetle

Hemipeplus saymyname is a species of beetle in the family Mycteridae, subfamily Hemipeplinae. It is known from Malaysia, specifically from Sabah, Borneo, where it was collected in the Keningau region and Mount Kinabalu.

== Taxonomy ==
The species was described in 2025 by KC & Pollock. The type material consists of a holotype (male) and ten paratype specimens. The specific name, saymyname, is derived from the quote "Say my name" from the popular TV series Breaking Bad.

== Description ==
Hemipeplus saymyname is characterized by its dull rufous elytra, which are often suffused with a light piceous shade. The scape is submoniliform and dilated apically, while the antennae are shorter than the combined length of the head and pronotum. The pronotum is subcordiform with a moderate anterior emargination, rounded anterolateral angles, and a faint median notch. The male genitalia are distinguished by a long, slender lobe of the basale, a wide penis, and slender, slightly arcuate parameres with blunt tips.

== Distribution ==
Hemipeplus saymyname is found in Sabah, Malaysia, specifically in the Keningau region and Mount Kinabalu.
