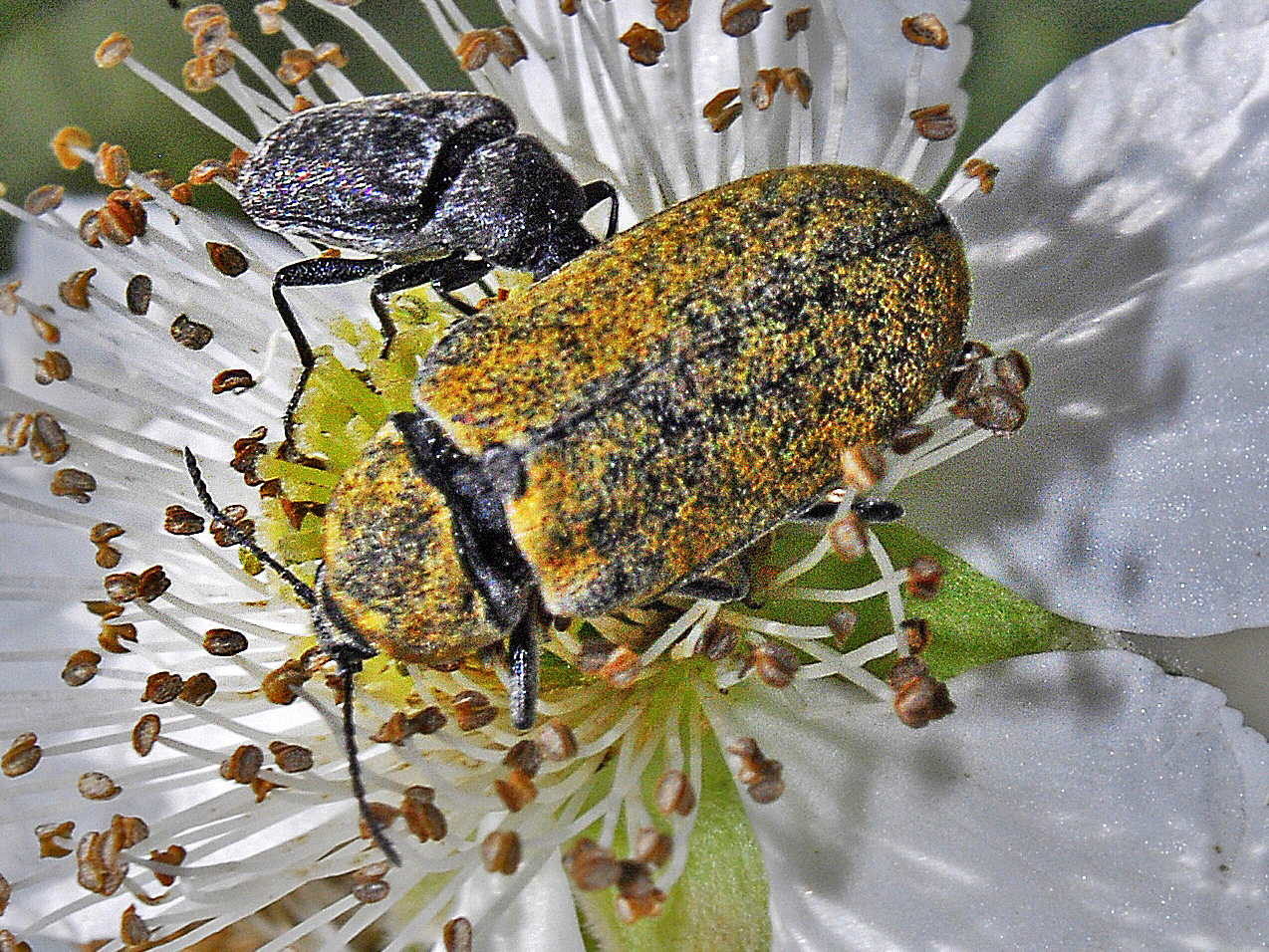
- In Genova, Italy

Scientific classification
- Kingdom: Animalia
- Phylum: Arthropoda
- Class: Insecta
- Order: Coleoptera
- Suborder: Polyphaga
- Infraorder: Cucujiformia
- Family: Mycteridae
- Genus: Mycterus
- Species: M. umbellatarum

Binomial name
- Mycterus umbellatarum (Fabricius, 1787

Synonyms
- List: Bruchus umbellatarum Fabricius, 1792; Mycterus pulverulentus Chevrolat, 1844; Mycterus siculus Baudi, 1883; Mycterus subtruncatus Guillebeau, 1893; Mycterus umbellatarum Mulsant, 1859; Mycterus umbellatarum Olivier, 1807; Rhinomacer umbellatarum Latreille, 1804

= Mycterus umbellatarum =

Species of beetle

Mycterus umbellatarum is a species of soft wing flower beetle in the family Mycteridae. It occurs in Europe and North Africa.

== Distribution ==
This species is present in part of Central and Southern Europe (Germany, Greece, Italy, Portugal, Spain and Switzerland) and in North Africa.

== Description ==
Mycterus umbellatarum can reach a body length of about 5–10 mm (0.20–0.39 in). These beetles are rather variable in size and colour. This species is similar to Mycterus curculioides and Mycterus tibialis. They can be distinguished by the length and thickness of rostrum.
