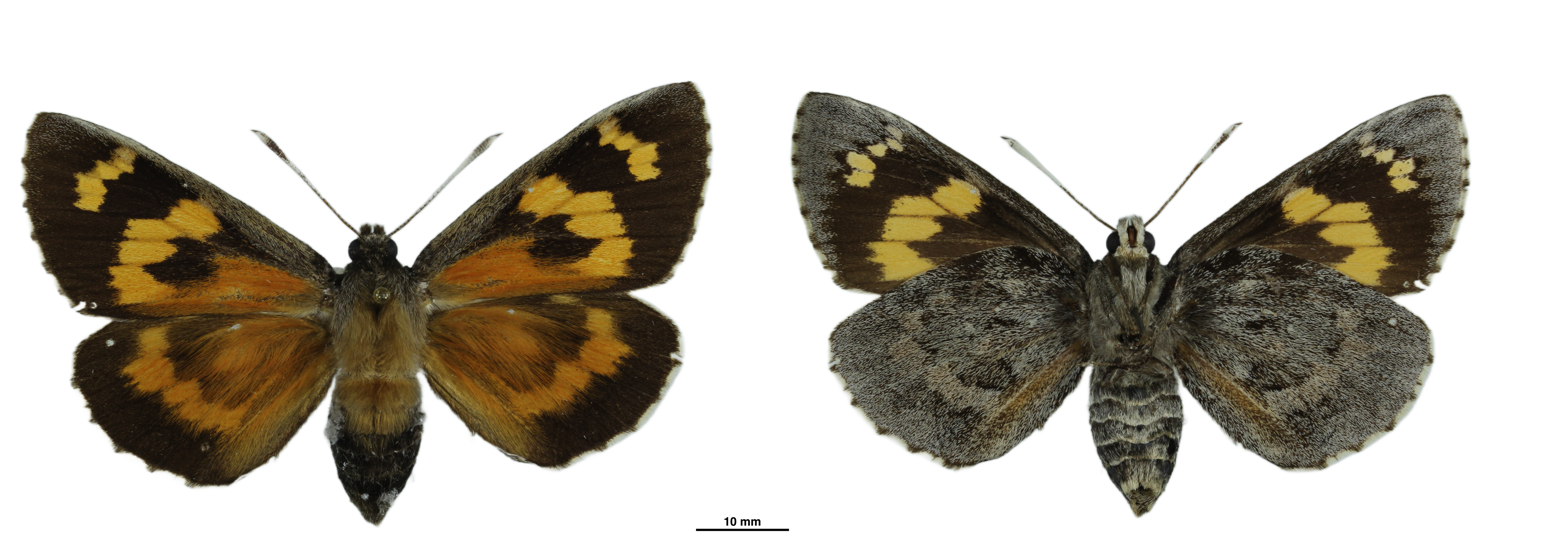
- Holotype, dorsal and ventral views

Scientific classification
- Kingdom: Animalia
- Phylum: Arthropoda
- Clade: Pancrustacea
- Class: Insecta
- Order: Lepidoptera
- Family: Hesperiidae
- Genus: Aegiale
- Species: A. occidentalis

Binomial name
- Aegiale occidentalis KC, McGuire, & Shirey, 2026

= Aegiale occidentalis =

Western tequila giant skipper

Species of skipper butterfly from Mexico

Aegiale occidentalis, the western tequila giant skipper, is a species of skipper butterfly in the subfamily Hesperiinae of the family Hesperiidae. It was described in 2026 by KC, McGuire, Willmott, Sapkota, and Shirey, making it a newly recognized species within the genus Aegiale.

== Taxonomy ==
Aegiale occidentalis is one of two recognized species in the genus Aegiale C. Felder & R. Felder, 1860, the other being Aegiale hesperiaris (Walker, 1856), the Tequila Giant Skipper. The ZooBank registration for A. occidentalis is 80FB045C-D332-48A5-82AF-E991F6FE7909.

The species epithet occidentalis is treated as a noun in apposition, derived from the Latin occidentalis, meaning "western", in reference to the species' known distribution in the Sierra Madre Occidental of western Mexico.

== Description ==
=== Adult ===
The holotype is a female with a forewing length of 44 mm. The dorsal forewing has a blackish-brown background with orange scaling at the base and along the discal band. The discal cell spot is entirely orange. The subapical spots (M2–R3) are unevenly conjoined and uniformly orange, with spots M2 and M1 fully aligned. The hindwing (35 mm) has extensive orange scaling from the base through the postdiscal area. Ventrally, the wings are clothed in dark gray overscales. The antennae are 19 mm long, mostly scaled white with long, slender clubs. The male is unknown.

=== Eggs ===
Eggs are dome-shaped, approximately 2.5 mm in diameter, with a ~0.6 mm circular depression at the top. Color is amber in the museum specimen; likely whitish in fresh condition.

=== Female genitalia ===
The papillae anales are almond-shaped, approximately 2× longer than wide, with rows of long dense setae. The sterigma is sclerotized overall, but the lower margin is unsclerotized, and the upper margin bears two rounded humps. This contrasts with A. hesperiaris, in which the papillae anales are more than 3× longer than wide and the sterigma has all margins well sclerotized with a concave upper margin.

== Distinction from Aegiale hesperiaris ==
A. hesperiaris can be distinguished from A. occidentalis by several characters:

1. The apical forewing spots in A. occidentalis are dark orange with unaligned inner margins; in A. hesperiaris the anterior apical spots are white to whitish with aligned inner margins, and spots M1 and M2 have their inner margins curved inward.
2. Spots CuA1 and M3 are obliquely inclined toward the costa in A. occidentalis, whereas they are more vertical in A. hesperiaris.
3. The forewing discal cell spot is entirely orange in A. occidentalis; in A. hesperiaris the upper portion is white to whitish.
4. The ventral surface is darker gray in A. occidentalis compared to the paler gray of A. hesperiaris.
5. Female papillae anales are ~2× longer than wide in A. occidentalis versus >3× in A. hesperiaris.
6. The sterigma is shorter with an unsclerotized lower margin and two round humps on the upper margin in A. occidentalis; longer, fully sclerotized, and concave on the upper margin in A. hesperiaris.

== Distribution ==
Aegiale occidentalis is currently known only from its type locality near San Antonio, Sonora, Mexico, in the Sierra Madre Occidental. The estimated coordinates of the type locality are 28.415°N, 109.110°W, at an elevation of approximately 1,170 m. The label data from the holotype indicates the specimen was collected approximately 7 miles east of the junction of Route 117 (San Nicolas) on Route 16 in Sonora.

== Biology ==
=== Flight period ===
Adults have been recorded in June. A possible August flight period has also been suggested.

=== Host plants ===
The larval host plant has not been confirmed for A. occidentalis. Given its membership in Megathyminae, agave or related agavoid plants are suspected, consistent with the biology of other giant skippers.

== Type material ==
The holotype is a female (MGCL 1199968) held in the McGuire Center for Lepidoptera and Biodiversity (MGCL) collection at the Florida Museum of Natural History (FLMNH), University of Florida. It was collected on June 20, 1992, by W. McGuire, (ex K. Roever). The abdomen was removed for genitalia analysis, the proboscis for measurement, and the hindlegs for DNA sequencing; these are preserved separately.
