= Bagger (surname) =

Bagger is the surname of:

- Ankie Bagger (born 1964), Swedish disco/pop musician and singer
- Eric Bagger (born 1955), Swedish writer and principal
- Hartmut Bagger (1938–2024), German general and Chief of Staff of the German armed forces
- Hedevig Johanne Bagger (1740–1822), Danish innkeeper and postmaster
- Herman Bagger (1800–1880), Norwegian newspaper editor and politician
- Jonathan Bagger (born 1955), American theoretical physicist
- Mianne Bagger (born 1966), Danish golfer
- Richard Bagger (born 1960), American politician, former New Jersey state senator and former chief of staff of Governor Chris Christie
- Ruben Bagger (born 1972), Danish former footballer
- Rüdiger Bagger (born 1943), German public prosecutor
- Stein Bagger (born 1967), Danish entrepreneur and businessman convicted of fraud and forgery
