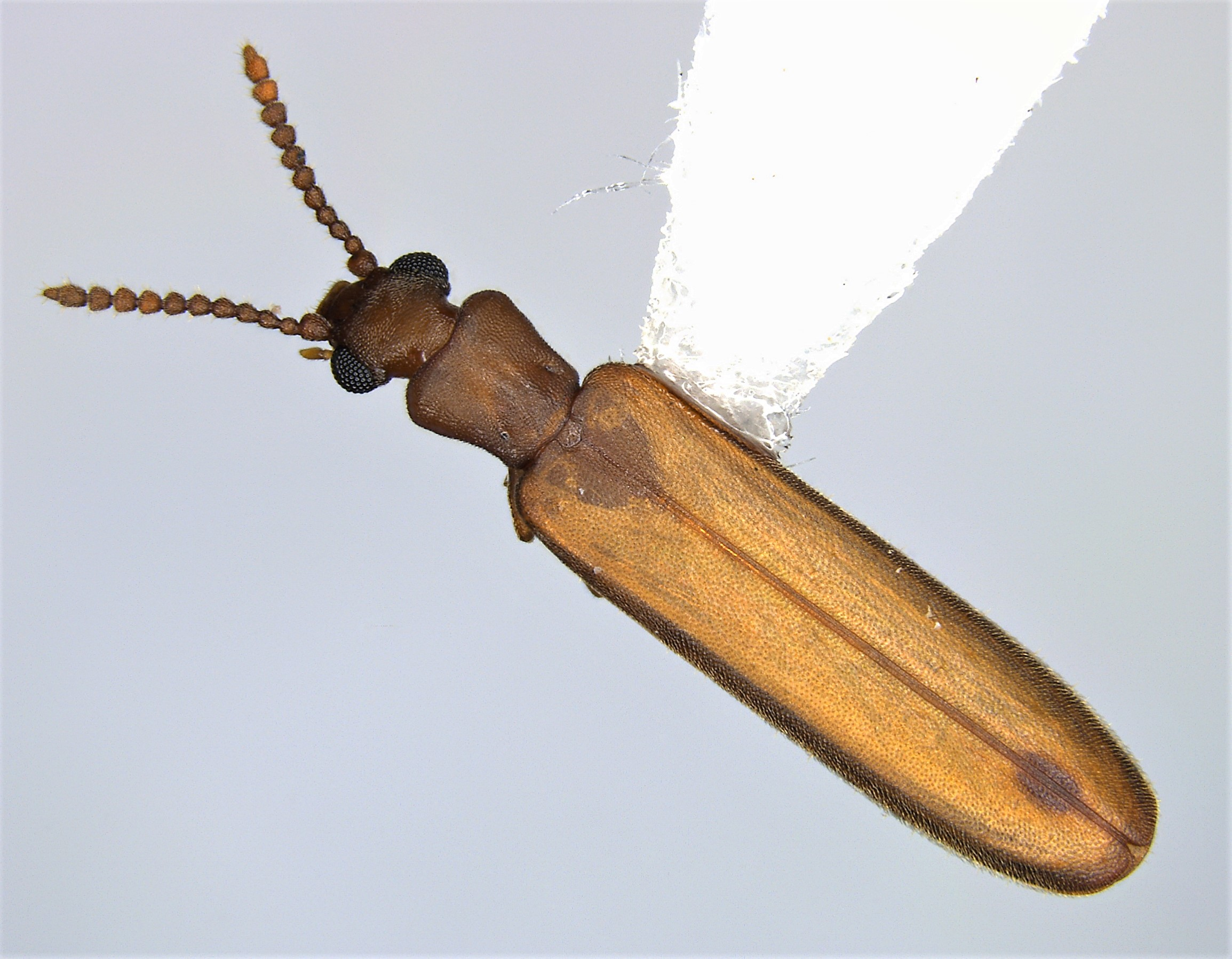

Scientific classification
- Kingdom: Animalia
- Phylum: Arthropoda
- Class: Insecta
- Order: Coleoptera
- Suborder: Polyphaga
- Infraorder: Cucujiformia
- Family: Mycteridae
- Genus: Hemipeplus
- Species: H. chaos

Binomial name
- Hemipeplus chaos Thomas, 1985

= Hemipeplus chaos =

Species of beetle

Hemipeplus chaos is a species of beetle in the family Mycteridae. It is found in Central America and North America. It is frequently found sheltered between blades of unopened Sabal palmetto fronds, although it is not known to cause any feeding damage to the plant.

This species was described in 1985 by entomologist Michael C. Thomas, who determined that samples of this species previously collected by earlier entomologists had been misidentified as females of a related species, Hemipeplus marginipennis. He gave it the specific epithet chaos, stating that it "is derived from the Greek word meaning 'utter disorder and confusion,' and refers to the taxonomic confusion among these species."
