= Hemipeplus microphthalmus =

Scientific classification
- Kingdom: Animalia
- Phylum: Arthropoda
- Class: Insecta
- Order: Coleoptera
- Suborder: Polyphaga
- Infraorder: Cucujiformia
- Family: Mycteridae
- Genus: Hemipeplus
- Species: H. microphthalmus

Binomial name
- Hemipeplus microphthalmus (Schwarz, 1878)

Species of beetle

Hemipeplus microphthalmus is a species of beetle in the family Mycteridae. It is found in Central America and North America.
