= Mycterus canescens =

Scientific classification
- Domain: Eukaryota
- Kingdom: Animalia
- Phylum: Arthropoda
- Class: Insecta
- Order: Coleoptera
- Suborder: Polyphaga
- Infraorder: Cucujiformia
- Family: Mycteridae
- Genus: Mycterus
- Species: M. canescens

Binomial name
- Mycterus canescens Horn, 1879

Species of beetle

Mycterus canescens is a species of beetle in the family Mycteridae. It is found in North America.
