= Pytho seidlitzi =

Scientific classification
- Domain: Eukaryota
- Kingdom: Animalia
- Phylum: Arthropoda
- Class: Insecta
- Order: Coleoptera
- Suborder: Polyphaga
- Infraorder: Cucujiformia
- Family: Pythidae
- Genus: Pytho
- Species: P. seidlitzi

Binomial name
- Pytho seidlitzi Blair, 1925

Species of beetle

Pytho seidlitzi is a species of dead log beetle in the family Pythidae. It is found in North America.
