= Parrhasius =

Parrhasius (Greek: Παρράσιος) may refer to:

- Persons:
  - Parrhasius (painter), a famous painter who worked in Athens in the late 5th century BC
  - Janus Parrhasius (1470–1522), Italian humanist scholar
  - Parrhasius (mythology), multiple figures from Greek mythology
- Taxonomy:
  - Parrhasius (butterfly), a butterfly genus
