= Pytho =

Pytho may refer to:

- Delphi or Pytho, a sacred precinct that served as the seat of the oracle Pythia
- Pytho, listed by Servius as one of the Hyades in Greek mythology
- Pytho (beetle), a genus of dead-log beetles

== See also ==
- Python (mythology)
