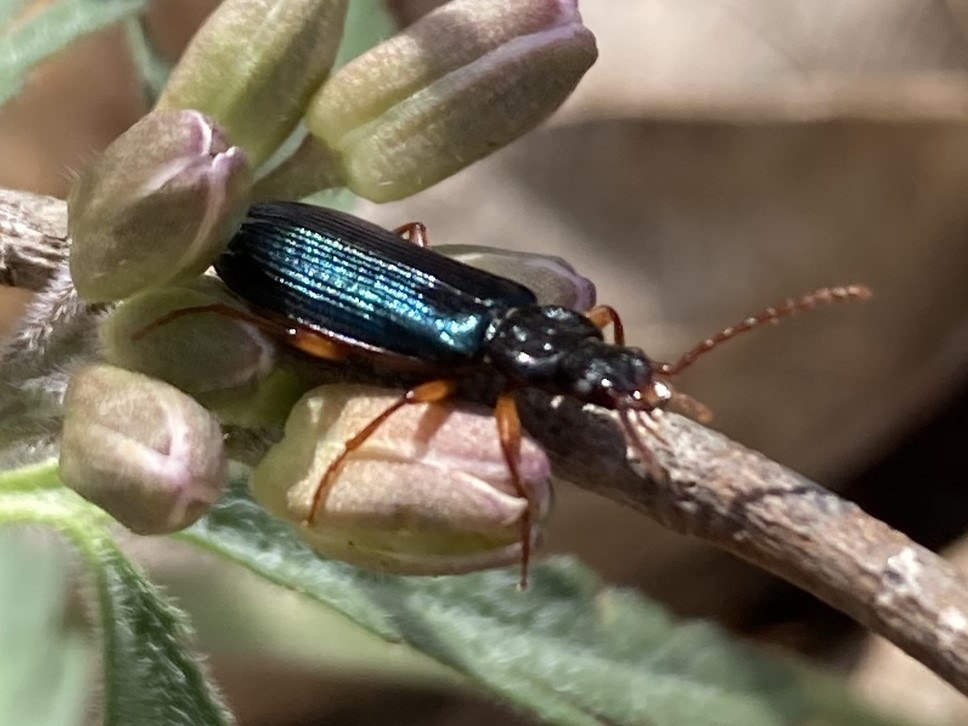

Scientific classification
- Domain: Eukaryota
- Kingdom: Animalia
- Phylum: Arthropoda
- Class: Insecta
- Order: Coleoptera
- Suborder: Polyphaga
- Infraorder: Cucujiformia
- Family: Pythidae
- Genus: Pytho
- Species: P. americanus

Binomial name
- Pytho americanus Kirby, 1837

Synonyms
- Pytho deplanatus Mannerheim, 1843

= Pytho americanus =

Species of beetle

Pytho americanus is a species of dead log beetle in the family Pythidae. It is found in North America. This beetle is able to overwinter both as a larva and an adult. It synthesizes glycerol during cold acclimation.
