= Vändåtberget =

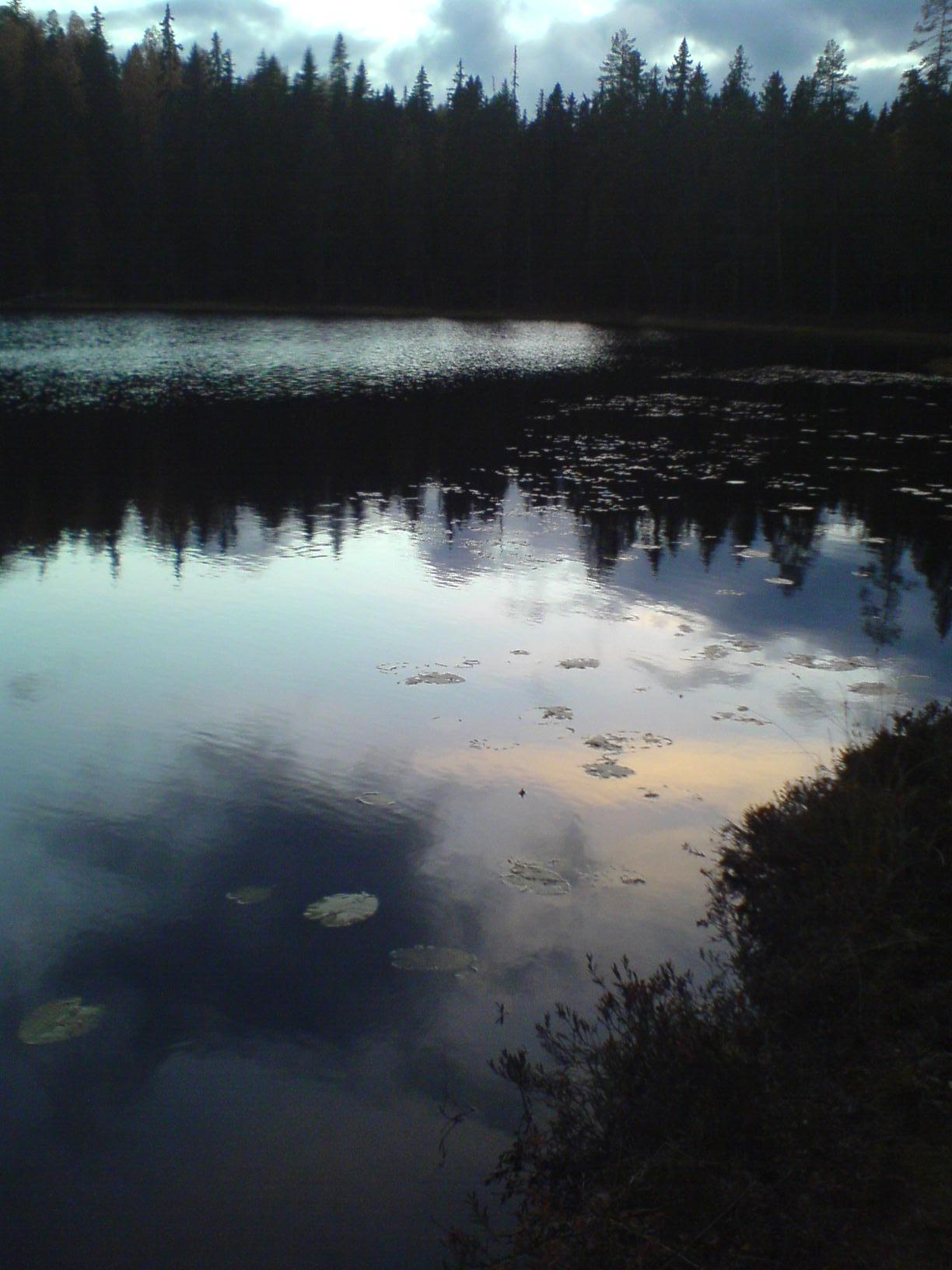
- Inner-Abborrtjärnen, a lakelet in the center of the reserve.

- Location within Sweden
- Coordinates: 63°48′30″N 18°18′0″E
- Country: Sweden
- County: Västernorrland

Area
  - Total: 3.45 km^{2} (1.33 sq mi)

Vändåtberget is a nature reserve in Västernorrland County in Sweden located 50 kilometres northwest of the town Örnsköldsvik. The reserve was established on 1 July 1989 and has an area of 3.45 km^{2}.

The old-growth forest of Vändåt is a habitat for the highly endangered beetle Pytho kolwensis, in the genus Pytho and the family Pythidae. It is also a habitat for a longhorn beetle, Nothorhina punctata.

The meaning of the name “Vändåt” is not known.

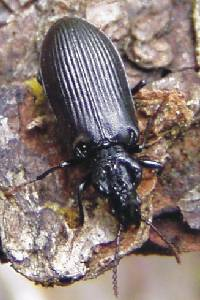
Pytho kolwensis, a rarity that can be found in Vändåtberget.
