= Lacconotus punctatus =

Scientific classification
- Domain: Eukaryota
- Kingdom: Animalia
- Phylum: Arthropoda
- Class: Insecta
- Order: Coleoptera
- Suborder: Polyphaga
- Infraorder: Cucujiformia
- Family: Mycteridae
- Genus: Lacconotus
- Species: L. punctatus

Binomial name
- Lacconotus punctatus LeConte, 1862

Species of beetle

Lacconotus punctatus is a species of beetle in the family Mycteridae. It is found in North America.
