= Mycterus quadricollis =

Scientific classification
- Domain: Eukaryota
- Kingdom: Animalia
- Phylum: Arthropoda
- Class: Insecta
- Order: Coleoptera
- Suborder: Polyphaga
- Infraorder: Cucujiformia
- Family: Mycteridae
- Genus: Mycterus
- Species: M. quadricollis

Binomial name
- Mycterus quadricollis Horn, 1874

Synonyms
- Mycterus depressus Champion, 1889

Species of beetle

Mycterus quadricollis is a species of palm or flower beetle in the family Mycteridae. It is found in North America.
