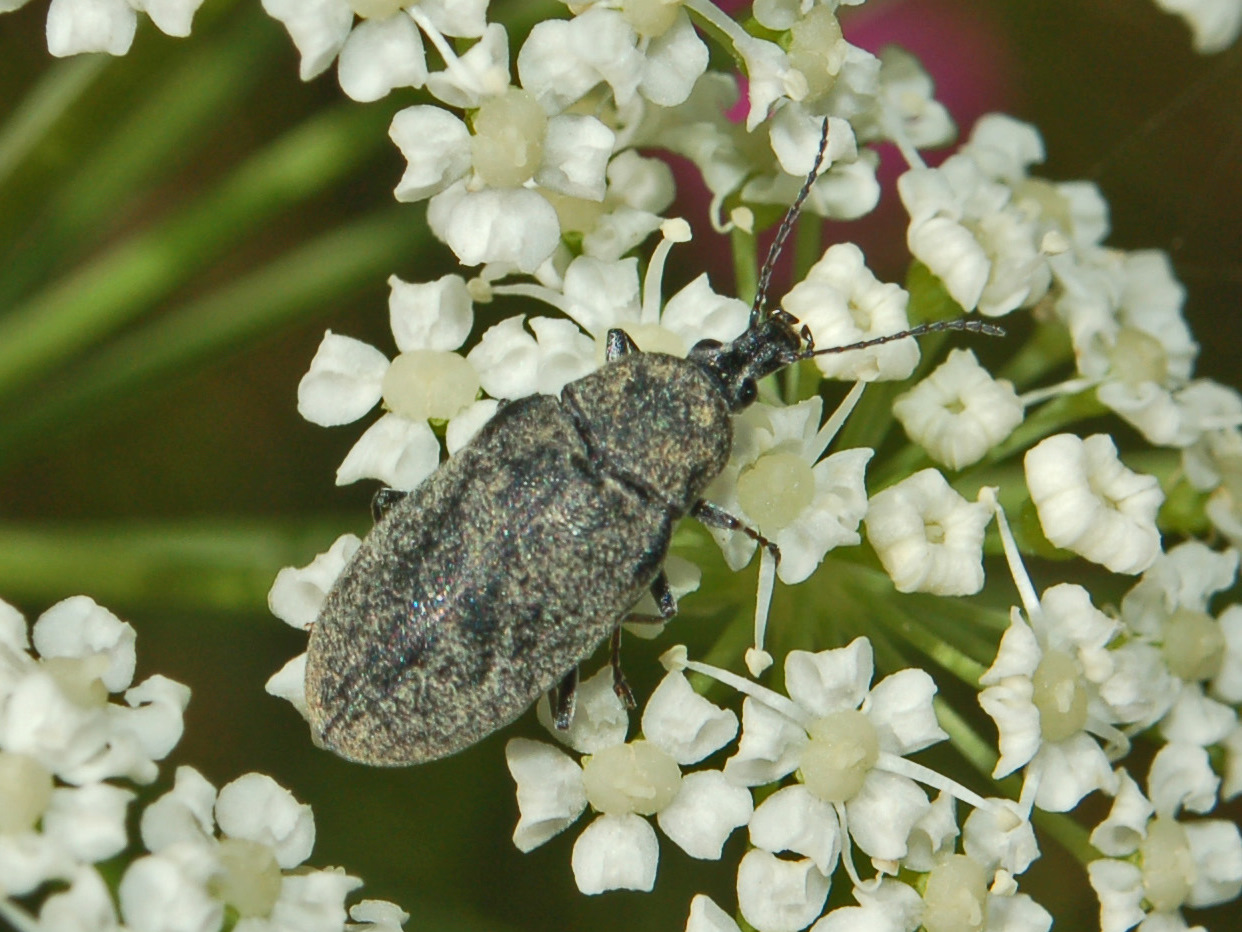
- Mycterus curculioides

Scientific classification
- Kingdom: Animalia
- Phylum: Arthropoda
- Class: Insecta
- Order: Coleoptera
- Suborder: Polyphaga
- Infraorder: Cucujiformia
- Family: Mycteridae
- Genus: Mycterus; Clairville, 1798

= Mycterus =

Genus of beetles

Mycterus is a genus of palm and flower beetles in the family Mycteridae. There are about seven described species in Mycterus.

== Species ==
- Mycterus canescens Horn, 1879
- Mycterus concolor LeConte, 1853
- Mycterus curculioides (Fabricius, 1781)
- Mycterus elongata Hopping, 1935
- Mycterus marmoratus Pollock, 1993
- Mycterus quadricollis Horn, 1874
- Mycterus scaber Haldeman, 1843
- Mycterus umbellatarum (Fabricius, 1787)
- Mycterus youngi Pollock 2012
