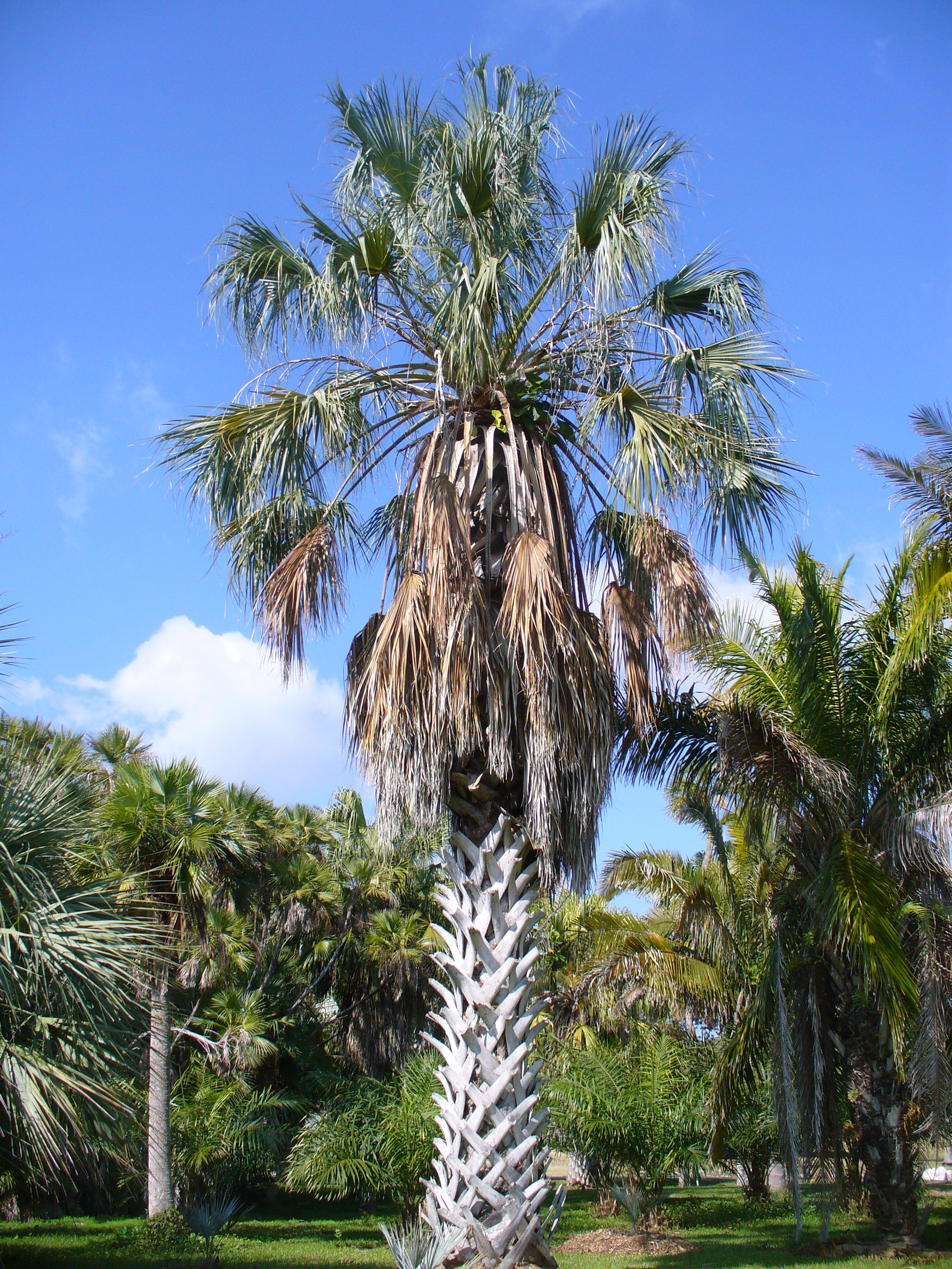

Conservation status
- Vulnerable (IUCN 2.3)

Scientific classification
- Kingdom: Plantae
- Clade: Tracheophytes
- Clade: Angiosperms
- Clade: Monocots
- Clade: Commelinids
- Order: Arecales
- Family: Arecaceae
- Genus: Sabal
- Species: S. uresana

Binomial name
- Sabal uresana Trel., 1900

= Sabal uresana =

Species of palm

Sabal uresana, commonly known as the Sonoran palmetto, is a species of palm tree that is native to the foothills of the Sierra Madre Occidental in northwestern Mexico (states of Chihuahua and Sonora). The specific epithet, "uresana", refers to Ures, Sonora, a town within its range. It is threatened by habitat loss. It is known to be the only known host plant for Hemipeplus pollocki.

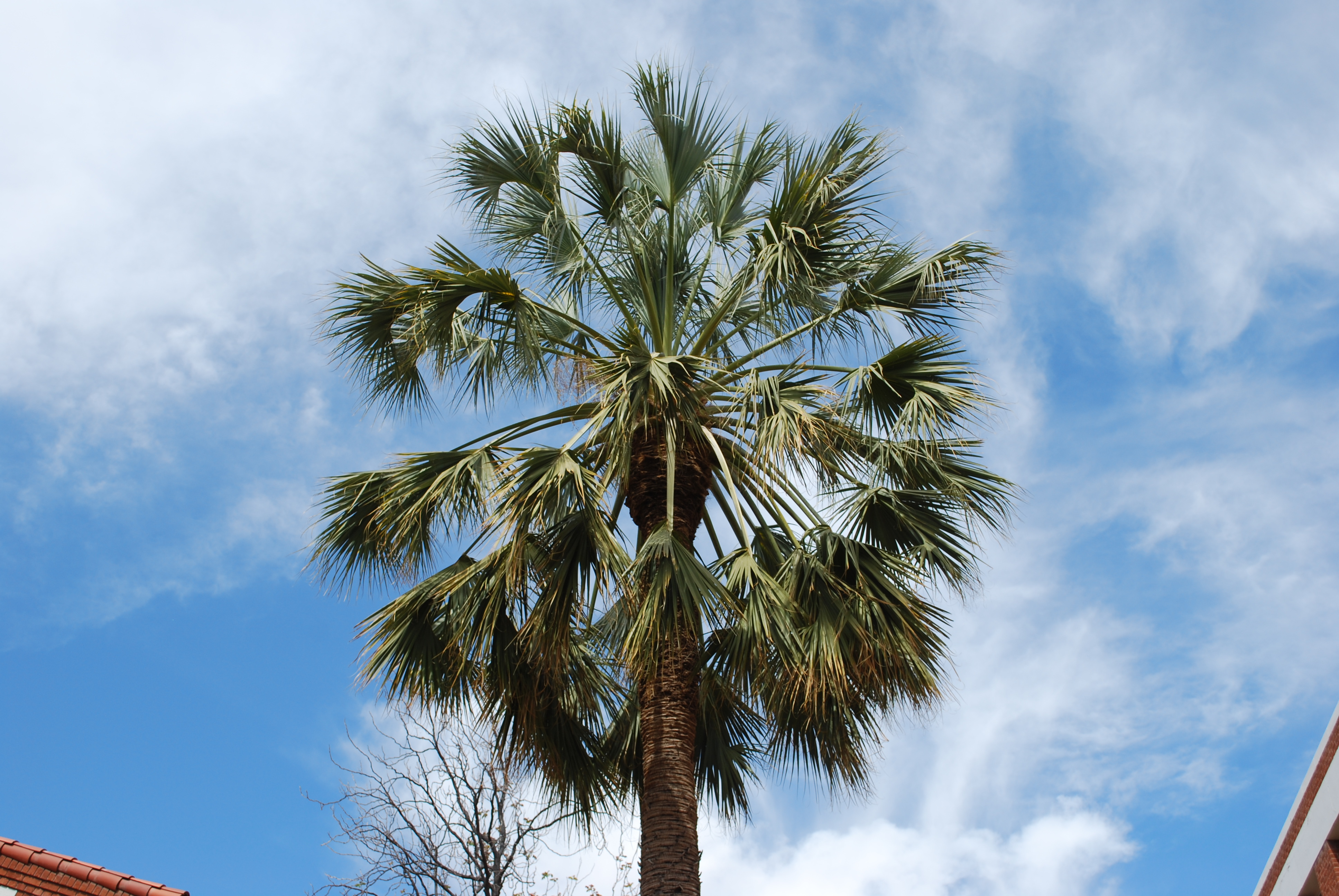
Sabal uresana growing as an ornamental in Tucson, Arizona.
