= Lacconotus =

Scientific classification
- Domain: Eukaryota
- Kingdom: Animalia
- Phylum: Arthropoda
- Class: Insecta
- Order: Coleoptera
- Suborder: Polyphaga
- Infraorder: Cucujiformia
- Family: Mycteridae
- Genus: Lacconotus; LeConte, 1862

Genus of beetles

Lacconotus is a genus of palm and flower beetles in the family Mycteridae. There are two described species in Lacconotus.

== Species ==
These species belong to the genus Lacconotus:

- Lacconotus pinicola Horn, 1879
- Lacconotus punctatus LeConte, 1862
