= Reijo Härkönen =

Finnish journalist (1948–2021)

- Born: August 25, 1948; Valtimo
- Died: July 8, 2021 (aged 72)
- Education: University of Tampere
- Occupations: Journalist, travel writer
- Known for: Finland–Nepal relations

Reijo Härkönen (25 August 1948 – 8 July 2021) was a Finnish journalist and travel writer best known for spending nearly four decades building cultural and tourism ties between Finland and Nepal. He served for many years as the Nepal Tourism Board's honorary public relations representative in Finland and helped found the Finland–Nepal Society.

== Early life and education ==
Härkönen was born on 25 August 1948 in Valtimo, in a farming family. His curiosity about the wider world began early: as a schoolboy he took up DX listening, tuning into distant radio stations, and started writing a radio column for the newspaper Karjalan Maa — a hobby that pointed him toward journalism before he had finished school. He went on to study at the Alkio Institute and completed a journalism degree at the University of Tampere.

== Career ==
Härkönen settled in Helsinki, which became his home for the rest of his life. He began his career as managing editor of the magazine Elanto before moving into insurance industry communications, where he spent the longest stretch of his working life editing publications for the LähiTapiola group.

Journalism by day left room for travel writing on the side, and Härkönen used it. He freelanced travel pieces for Finnish newspapers and magazines for years, developing a reputation for sharp, well-observed snapshots of daily life in the places he visited. He also wrote books, including several children's titles co-created with Matti A. Pitkänen as part of the World's Children series, some of which appeared in English-language editions for young readers abroad. His own travels in Nepal across nearly three decades were eventually collected in Tiikerin jalanjälki (2009), drawing on visits made between 1982 and 2009.

He stayed closely involved with the Finnish Travel Journalists' Guild (Finnish: Matkailutoimittajien Kilta) for decades, helping organize its trips and events, and was elected its chairman in 2018 — a role he held until his death.

== Nepal advocacy ==
Härkönen's first trip to Nepal, in 1982, changed the course of his life. He was taken with the country immediately, and for nearly forty years afterward he returned almost every year, often staying about a month at a time. He came to call Nepal his "second homeland."

That attachment turned into institution-building. He helped found the Finland–Nepal Society and later served as its chairman, and for many years he carried the formal title of Honorary Public Relations Representative of the Nepal Tourism Board (NTB) in Finland. The role was not ceremonial only: when the NTB made its first appearance at Helsinki's Matka Nordic Travel Fair in 2008, it was Härkönen who wrote the feature on the Himalayas and Nepali culture for the fair's Panorama magazine issue, drawing visitor interest to the new exhibitor. Three years later, at a Helsinki event marking Nepal Tourism Year 2011, he and Matti Penttilä, president of the Nepal Finland Friendship Association, spoke about the relationship between the two countries he had spent decades trying to bring closer together.

== Human rights activism ==
Härkönen's writing was not confined to travel. He used newspaper articles and opinion pieces to speak out on human rights issues, at home and abroad. That activism had a cost: his support for Soviet dissidents drew the attention of the KGB, which monitored his movements in Estonia, and in 1987 he was barred from entry for five years.

== Legacy ==
In 2025, the beetle species Hemipeplus harkoneni (Coleoptera: Mycteridae), described from the Philippines, was named in Härkönen's honor in recognition of his support for children in Nepal, among whom the species' first author had been one.

== Personal life and death ==
In his later years Härkönen's attention turned back toward where he had started — his home region and his family's roots. His house on the shore of Nuolijärvi, a village in his native Valtimo, mattered to him. Those who knew him described a man who didn't draw attention to himself: quiet, friendly, even reserved, but warm and dependable as a friend.

He died on 8 July 2021 in Helsinki, at the age of 72.

== Selected works ==
- (with Matti A. Pitkänen) The Children of Nepal (World's Children series), 1990
- (with Matti A. Pitkänen) The Children of China (World's Children series), 1990
- (with Matti A. Pitkänen) The Children of Egypt (World's Children series), 1991
- (with Matti A. Pitkänen) The Grandchildren of the Vikings (World's Children series), 1996
- Tiikerin jalanjälki: matkakertomuksia Himalajan juurelta vuosilta 1982–2009 (2009)
- Matti Härkönen: Karjalan salomaiden herättäjä (2017)
