= Eric Bagger =

Swedish writer and principal

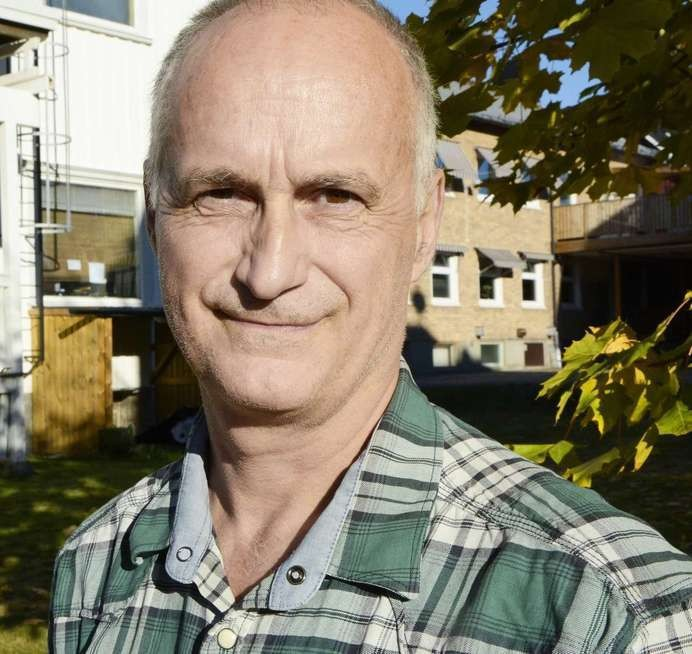
- Eric Bagger 2015
- Born: Erik Nylander; 19 May 1955 (age 71)
- Citizenship: Örnsköldsvik
- Occupations: Writer and school principal
- Spouse(s): Anneli Bengtzelius (1988–2006), Anette Bagger, born Johansson (2010–)
- Writing career
- Language: Swedish
- Years active: 1983–
- Genres: Fantasy, naturalism
- Subject: Vändåtberget
- Website: granskatan.blogspot.se

Eric Bagger (born Nylander; 19 May 1955 in Örnsköldsvik, Sweden) is a Swedish writer, journalist and principal.

== Bibliography ==
- Linnés vän Peter Artedi 1705–1735, Jubileumsskrift utgiven av Projekt Vision Artedi och Kulturföreningen Anundsjö Ton (2005) Eric Nylander and Bo R Holmberg.
- Vandrare i Vändåt, Visto förlag (2014)
- Lägereld - en faktaroman, Visto förlag (2018)
