= Parrhasius urraca =

Scientific classification
- Domain: Eukaryota
- Kingdom: Animalia
- Phylum: Arthropoda
- Class: Insecta
- Order: Lepidoptera
- Family: Lycaenidae
- Genus: Parrhasius
- Species: P. polibetes

Binomial name
- Parrhasius polibetes Nicolay, 1979

Species of butterfly

Parrhasius urraca is a butterfly of the family Lycaenidae. It was described by Stanley S. Nicolay in 1979. It is found in Panama.
