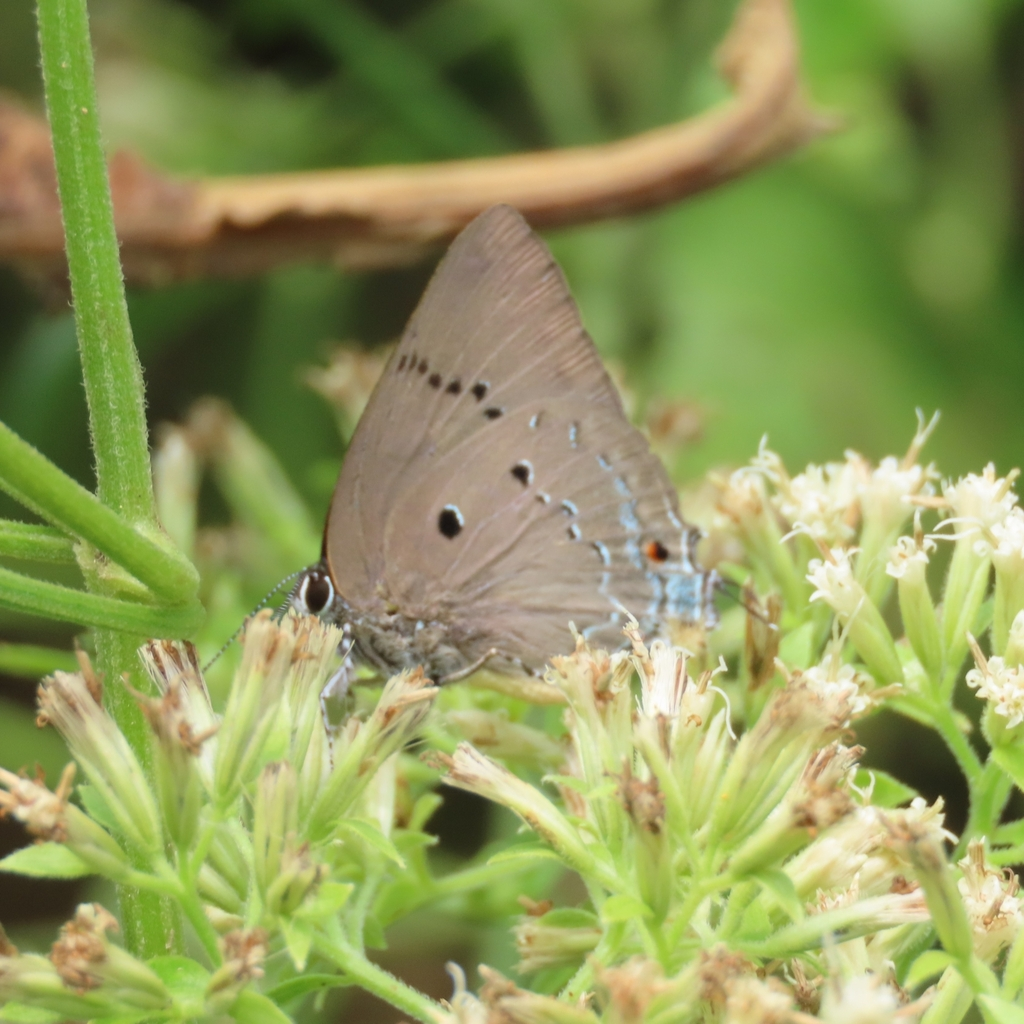

Scientific classification
- Domain: Eukaryota
- Kingdom: Animalia
- Phylum: Arthropoda
- Class: Insecta
- Order: Lepidoptera
- Family: Lycaenidae
- Genus: Parrhasius
- Species: P. polibetes

Binomial name
- Parrhasius polibetes (Stoll, [1781])

Synonyms
- Papilio polibetes Stoll, [1781]; Thecla zoë Reakirt, [1867]; Thecla zoe Reakirt, [1867]; Thecla arindela rinde Dyar, 1916

= Parrhasius polibetes =

Species of butterfly

Parrhasius polibetes is a butterfly of the family Lycaenidae. It was described by Caspar Stoll in 1781. It is found from Mexico to Brazil and Suriname.
