= Sphalma =

Scientific classification
- Domain: Eukaryota
- Kingdom: Animalia
- Phylum: Arthropoda
- Class: Insecta
- Order: Coleoptera
- Suborder: Polyphaga
- Infraorder: Cucujiformia
- Family: Pythidae
- Genus: Sphalma; Horn, 1872
- Species: S. quadricollis

Binomial name
- Sphalma quadricollis Horn, 1872

Genus of beetles

Sphalma is a genus of dead log beetles in the family Pythidae. There is one described species in Sphalma, S. quadricollis.
