= Priognathus =

Scientific classification
- Kingdom: Animalia
- Phylum: Arthropoda
- Class: Insecta
- Order: Coleoptera
- Suborder: Polyphaga
- Infraorder: Cucujiformia
- Family: Pythidae
- Genus: Priognathus; LeConte, 1850
- Species: P. monilicornis

Binomial name
- Priognathus monilicornis (Randall, 1838)

Genus of beetles

Priognathus is a genus of dead log beetles in the family Pythidae. There is one described species in Priognathus, P. monilicornis.
