= Trimitomerus =

Scientific classification
- Domain: Eukaryota
- Kingdom: Animalia
- Phylum: Arthropoda
- Class: Insecta
- Order: Coleoptera
- Suborder: Polyphaga
- Infraorder: Cucujiformia
- Family: Pythidae
- Genus: Trimitomerus; Horn, 1888
- Species: T. riversii

Binomial name
- Trimitomerus riversii Horn, 1888

Genus of beetles

Trimitomerus is a genus of dead log beetles in the family Pythidae. There is one described species in Trimitomerus, T. riversii.
