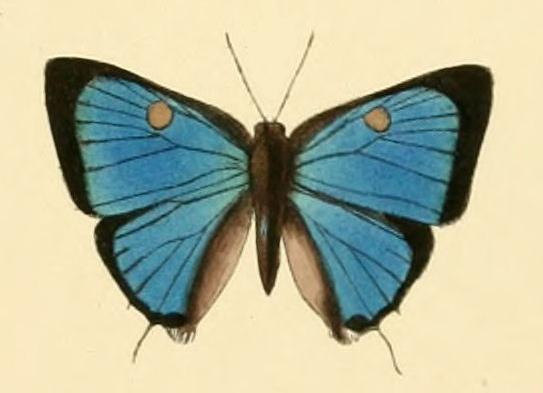

Scientific classification
- Domain: Eukaryota
- Kingdom: Animalia
- Phylum: Arthropoda
- Class: Insecta
- Order: Lepidoptera
- Family: Lycaenidae
- Genus: Parrhasius
- Species: P. orgia

Binomial name
- Parrhasius orgia (Hewitson, 1867)

Synonyms
- Thecla orgia Hewitson, 1867; Panthiades (Parrhasius) orgia; Thecla polibetes var. sedecia Hewitson, 1874 (preocc. Hewitson, 1874); Thecla teleontes Druce, 1890; Parrhasius orgia amazonis Nicolay, 1979; Parrhasius orgia melissa Nicolay, 1979; Parrhasius orgia orgiophantes Clench, 1979

= Parrhasius orgia =

Species of butterfly

Parrhasius orgia, the variable hairstreak, is a butterfly in the family Lycaenidae. It is found from Mexico to Venezuela, the Amazon, French Guiana, Colombia and Bolivia.
