= Parrhasius selika =

Scientific classification
- Domain: Eukaryota
- Kingdom: Animalia
- Phylum: Arthropoda
- Class: Insecta
- Order: Lepidoptera
- Family: Lycaenidae
- Genus: Parrhasius
- Species: P. selika

Binomial name
- Parrhasius selika (Hewitson, 1874)

Synonyms
- Thecla selika Hewitson, 1874; Thecla appula Hewitson, 1874

Species of butterfly

Parrhasius selika is a butterfly of the family Lycaenidae. It was described by William Chapman Hewitson in 1874. It is found in Brazil, Bolivia and Venezuela.
