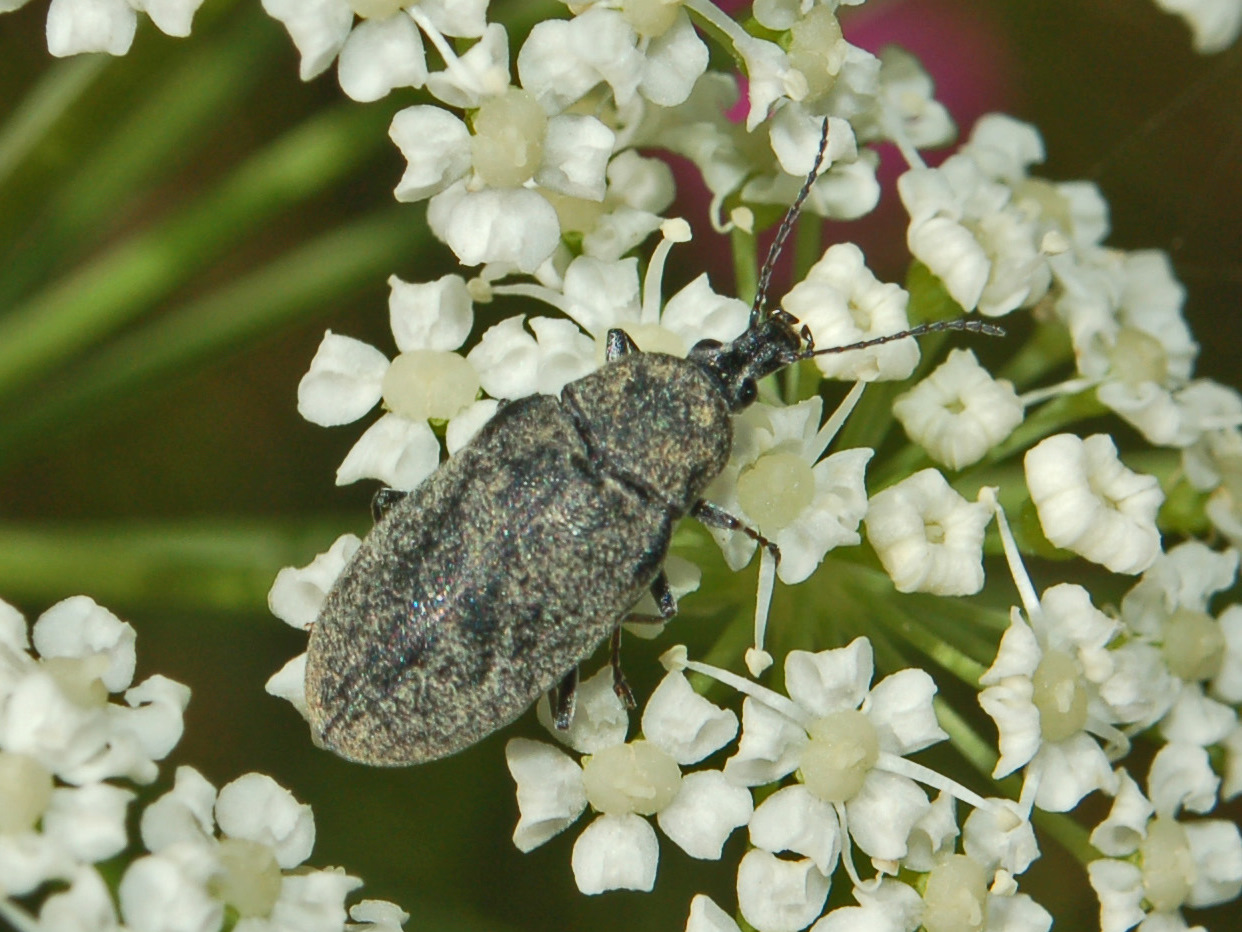

Scientific classification
- Kingdom: Animalia
- Phylum: Arthropoda
- Class: Insecta
- Order: Coleoptera
- Suborder: Polyphaga
- Infraorder: Cucujiformia
- Family: Mycteridae
- Genus: Mycterus
- Species: M. curculioides

Binomial name
- Mycterus curculioides (Fabricius, 1781)

Synonyms
- Rhinomacer curculionoides Olivier, 1803

= Mycterus curculioides =

Species of beetle

Mycterus curculioides is a species of beetles belonging to the family Mycteridae.

These beetles are present in British Isles, Italy, Greece, Hungary, Portugal, Spain, Southern Russia and in North Africa.

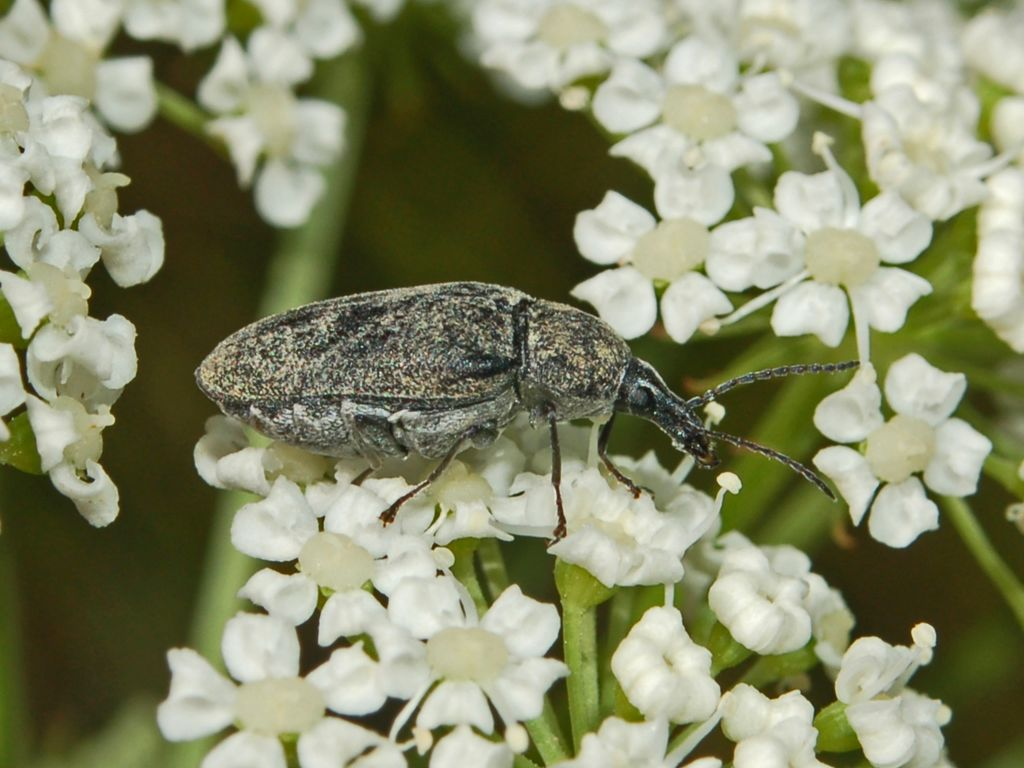
Mycterus curculioides – lateral view

They are dark grey, have thoracic and golden grey elytral pubescence and the head has an extended rostrum. They can be distinguished from Mycterus tibialis and Mycterus umbellatarum by their narrower and longer rostrum. The adults grow up to 7–9 millimetres (0.28–0.35 in) long.
