= Hemipeplinae =

Scientific classification
- Kingdom: Animalia
- Phylum: Arthropoda
- Clade: Pancrustacea
- Class: Insecta
- Order: Coleoptera
- Suborder: Polyphaga
- Infraorder: Cucujiformia
- Family: Mycteridae
- Subfamily: Hemipeplinae; Lacordaire, 1854

Genera
- Eurypeplus KC & Pollock, 2025; Hemipeplus Latreille, 1829; Holopeplus Arrow, 1930

Hemipeplinae is a subfamily of beetles in the family Mycteridae, sometimes referred to by the informal common name palm and flower beetles. The subfamily comprises three genera and, as of a 2025 taxonomic review, 59 described species distributed across the New World, Afrotropical, and Austro-Oriental biogeographic realms.

== Description ==
Adult Hemipeplinae have an almost flat, parallel-sided body with a subcordate pronotum, distinguishing them from the other two subfamilies of Mycteridae: Mycterinae, whose members are stout or dorsoventrally convex with a long rostrum and campanulate pronotum, and Eurypinae (=Lacconotinae), which are less dorsoventrally convex or pear-shaped with a subquadrate or transverse pronotum. Body size and features such as pronotal pads, temples, and truncate elytra vary among genera and species.

== Classification ==
Historically, only two genera were recognized in Hemipeplinae: Hemipeplus Latreille, 1829, the most speciose and pantropical genus, and Holopeplus Arrow, 1930, a monotypic genus known only from the Greater Antilles (Cuba and the Bahamas). A third genus, Eurypeplus KC & Pollock, was described in 2025 from Madagascar; it is also monotypic and shows some morphological resemblance to Eurypinae, though it is classified within Hemipeplinae based on its ventral characters.

Phylogenetically, Hemipeplinae is considered more closely related to Eurypinae than to Mycterinae.

== Taxonomic history ==
The name "Hemipeple" was first used, without any taxonomic description, by Latreille in 1825 under the family Cucujidae. A Latinized form, Hemipeplus, appeared in Berthold (1827) as a nomen nudum. Latreille formally described the genus Hemipeplus in 1829 based on a specimen collected in Scotland. During the 19th and early 20th centuries the group was shuffled between Cucujidae and Lagriidae. In 1930, Arrow split the group from Cucujidae and erected the family Hemipeplidae. Crowson & de Viedma (1964) subsequently placed Hemipeplus and Holopeplus within Mycteridae as the subfamily Hemipeplinae, based on the morphology of both adults and larvae, the classification generally followed today.

The most recent comprehensive taxonomic treatments were by Pollock in 1997 (Afrotropical species) and 1999 (New World species), and by KC & Pollock in 2025, which reviewed the entire world fauna, described the new genus Eurypeplus and 29 new species, proposed one new synonymy, and designated several type specimens.

== Distribution ==
Hemipeplinae are found in tropical, subtropical, and, to a lesser extent, temperate regions worldwide, with most diversity concentrated in warmer areas. As of the 2025 review, 22 species are known from the New World (Nearctic and Neotropics), 10 from the Afrotropical region, and 27 from the Austro-Oriental region, the last being the most speciose of the three realms.

== Biology and ecology ==
Hemipeplinae are consistently associated with monocots, mostly palms, and with gymnosperms. They were traditionally believed to be phytophagous and were reported as pests of palms. However, gut-content analysis of larvae and adults of several species found mostly fungal matter and almost no plant material, with no observed feeding damage on host plants, suggesting the beetles are mycophagous (fungus-feeding) rather than plant pests, similar to some Staphylinidae, Coccinellidae, Endomychidae, and Erotylidae. The detailed biology of most species remains unknown.
