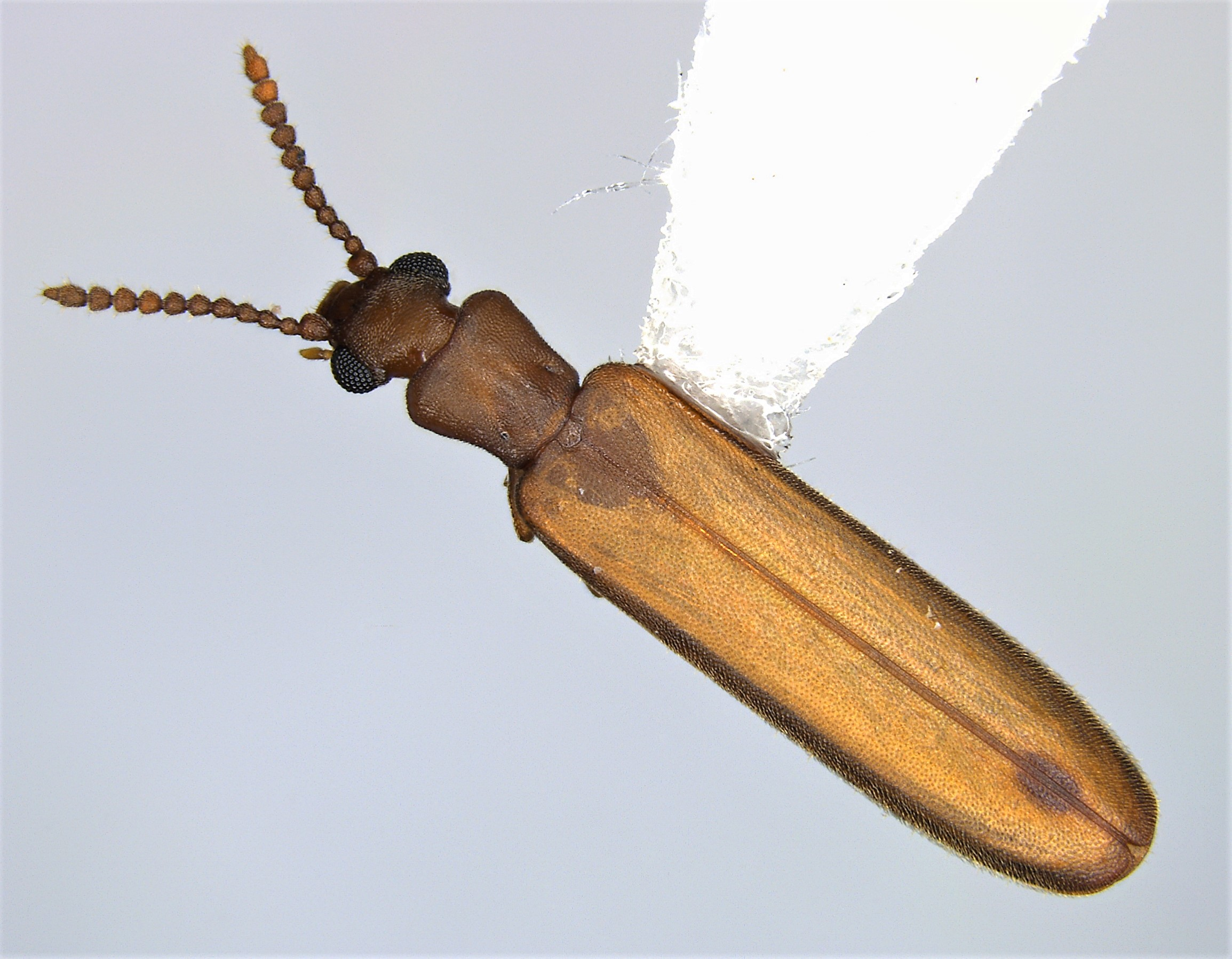
- Dorsal view of an adult Hemipeplus chaos beetle. Length: 4.2 mm

Scientific classification
- Kingdom: Animalia
- Phylum: Arthropoda
- Class: Insecta
- Order: Coleoptera
- Suborder: Polyphaga
- Infraorder: Cucujiformia
- Family: Mycteridae
- Subfamily: Hemipeplinae; Lacordaire, 1854
- Genus: Hemipeplus; Latreille, 1825

= Hemipeplus =

Genus of beetles

Hemipeplus is a genus of beetles in the family Mycteridae. There are 57 described species in Hemipeplus. These beetles are pantropical in distribution and primarily mycophagous.

== Species ==
The following species are included in the genus Hemipeplus:

== New World Hemipeplinae ==
1. Hemipeplus abditus Pollock, 1999
2. Hemipeplus angustipennis Pollock, 1999
3. Hemipeplus anishae KC & Pollock, 2025
4. Hemipeplus argentinus Pollock, 1999
5. Hemipeplus belizensis KC & Pollock, 2025
6. Hemipeplus bolivianus Pollock, 1999
7. Hemipeplus brasiliensis KC & Pollock, 2025
8. Hemipeplus chaos Thomas, 1985
9. Hemipeplus dominicensis Pollock, 1999
10. Hemipeplus gounellei Grouvelle, 1896
11. Hemipeplus hemipterus Lacordaire, 1854
12. Hemipeplus insularis Grouvelle, 1896
13. Hemipeplus longiscapus Pollock, 1999
14. Hemipeplus mexicanus Grouvelle, 1896
15. Hemipeplus microphthalmus (Schwarz, 1878)
16. Hemipeplus pollocki KC, 2025
17. Hemipeplus pseudoquadricollis KC & Pollock, 2025
18. Hemipeplus quadricollis Pollock, 1999
19. Hemipeplus thomasi Pollock, 1999

== Afrotropical Hemipeplinae ==
1. Hemipeplus africanus Grouvelle, 1915
2. Hemipeplus alluaudi Grouvelle, 1923
3. Hemipeplus dollmani Scott, 1933
4. Hemipeplus egregius Arrow, 1930
5. Hemipeplus grouvellei Pollock, 1997
6. Hemipeplus madagascariensis Grouvelle, 1906
7. Hemipeplus reichertae Pollock, 1997
8. Hemipeplus rodericensis Scott, 1933
9. Hemipeplus suturalis Grouvelle, 1919

== Austro-Oriental Hemipeplinae ==
1. Hemipeplus antennatus KC & Pollock, 2025
2. Hemipeplus australicus Arrow, 1930
3. Hemipeplus bromineus KC & Pollock, 2025
4. Hemipeplus bucculentus KC & Pollock, 2025
5. Hemipeplus craigi KC & Pollock, 2025
6. Hemipeplus enarotaliensis KC & Pollock, 2025
7. Hemipeplus exhaustus KC & Pollock, 2025
8. Hemipeplus gressitti KC & Pollock, 2025
9. Hemipeplus harkoneni KC & Pollock, 2025
10. Hemipeplus heisenbergi KC & Pollock, 2025
11. Hemipeplus joerebeccae KC & Pollock, 2025
12. Hemipeplus klematanicus (Gestro, 1873)
13. Hemipeplus labuanensis KC & Pollock, 2025
14. Hemipeplus luzonensis KC & Pollock, 2025
15. Hemipeplus manusicus KC & Pollock, 2025
16. Hemipeplus monteithi KC & Pollock, 2025
17. Hemipeplus miyamotoi Kamiya, 1961
18. Hemipeplus neoaustralicus KC & Pollock, 2025
19. Hemipeplus neoguineensis KC & Pollock, 2025
20. Hemipeplus nigerrimus KC & Pollock, 2025
21. Hemipeplus nuciferae Arrow, 1930
22. Hemipeplus palawanensis KC & Pollock, 2025
23. Hemipeplus philippinensis KC & Pollock, 2025
24. Hemipeplus pseudoklematanicus KC & Pollock, 2025
25. Hemipeplus rugosus KC & Pollock, 2025
26. Hemipeplus saymyname KC & Pollock, 2025
27. Hemipeplus sinensis KC & Pollock, 2025
