= Rüdiger Bagger =

German public prosecutor

Rüdiger Bagger (born 17 November 1943 in Gallgarben, East Prussia) was a renowned German public prosecutor until his retirement in 2008.

== Biography ==
Bagger grew up in Lower Saxony. He studied law in Hamburg. In 1977, Bagger joined the Hamburg Public Prosecutor's Office. Since 1988, he has served as press spokesman for the office. Among journalists, Bagger is known for a reputation that combines respect and controversy. He was nicknamed “Spocky,” a reference to his notably large ears.

In Hamburg he worked in the Organized Crime division for twelve years. His most high-profile case was the prosecution of Wilfrid “Frida” Schulz [de], known as the “Godfather” of St. Pauli.

In the film with the title Reeperbahn Spezialeinheit FD65: Der Pate von St. Pauli (Special Unit FD65: The Godfather of St. Pauli) with the story of the first German police team dedicated to combating organized crime, Rüdiger Bagger explained the working methods in the following words (in English translation):

Normal is how the public knows it: someone is murdered. When you see the crime scene, the detectives come and ask: Who was the perpetrator? — With us, it was the other way around: we had certain people and investigated based on the suspects. We didn’t yet know exactly what crimes they would commit, but we knew they would commit some. And now we take a closer look at these people.

After entering retirement in 2008, he moved to the Palatinate Forest.
