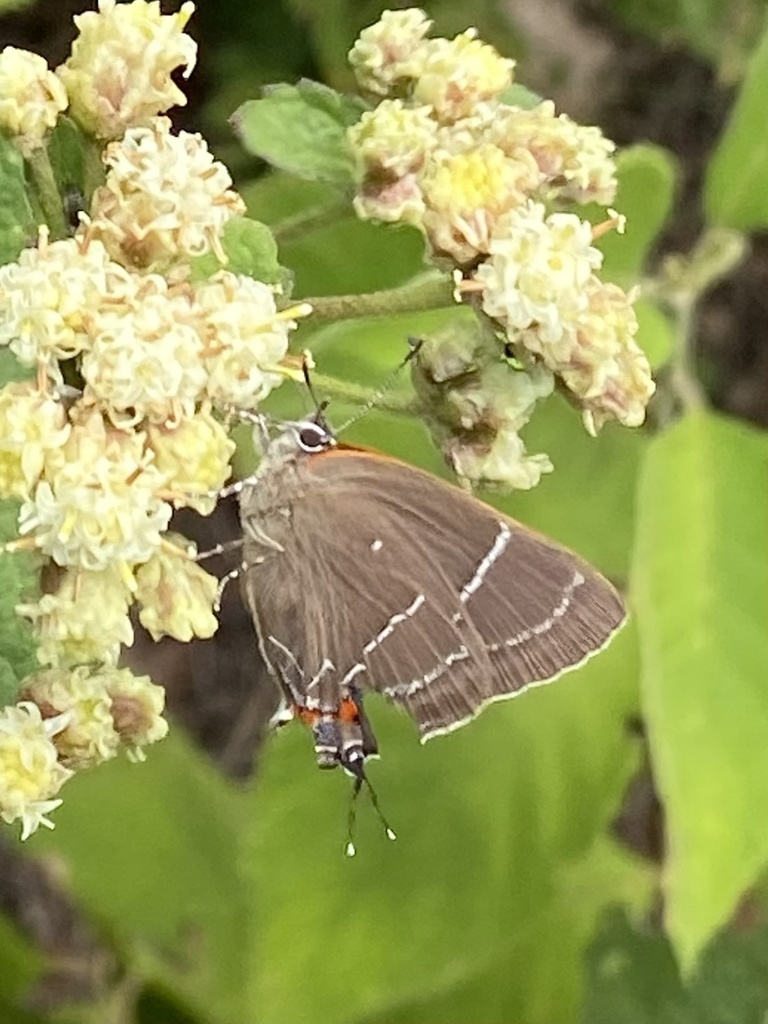

Scientific classification
- Kingdom: Animalia
- Phylum: Arthropoda
- Clade: Pancrustacea
- Class: Insecta
- Order: Lepidoptera
- Family: Lycaenidae
- Genus: Parrhasius
- Species: P. polibetes

Binomial name
- Parrhasius polibetes (Clench, 1971)

Synonyms
- Panthiades m-album moctezuma Clench, 1971

= Parrhasius moctezuma =

Species of butterfly

Parrhasius moctezuma is a butterfly of the family Lycaenidae. It was described by Harry Kendon Clench in 1971. It is found in Mexico.
