= Las Cuevas, Belize =

Las Cuevas
- Location within Belize
- Coordinates: 16°43′53″N 88°59′11″W
- Country: Belize
- District: Cayo District
- Time zone: UTC-6 (Central)

Las Cuevas is a Research Station and Explorers Lodge in the heart of the Chiquibul Tropical Moist Forest, at 550 m altitude in the Maya Mountains of Belize in Central America. It is an important centre for biological research established jointly by the Forest Department of Belize and the Natural History Museum, London in 1994. In May 1995 venturers from the charity Raleigh International built a 30-foot tower to help Ornithologists study flight paths in the area and watch out for forest fires. It is located close to the mouth of a large cave an ancient Mayan temple complex and Monkey Tail River which runs through the Virgin rainforest. Las Cuevas Research Station is located in Tropical Broadleaf Deciduous vegetation as described by Penn et al (2004) and is underlain by limestone dominated geology, which influences the high regional variations in vegetation classes across the Chiquibul. Las Cuevas Research Station is surrounded by a forest that is highly adapted to seasonal drought, frequent fires and the significant input of atmospherically derived nutrients. The nutrient-rich Inceptisols of this region support an abundant and diverse forest, dominated by Sabal mauritiiformis, Cryosophila stauracantha and Manilkara spp. The fine-textured soils in the depressions of the karstic Las Cuevas area collect and retain much available water during the wet season, thereby serving as refugia during particularly long periods of severe drought. To the extent that the soils around Las Cuevas and the Chiquibul region promote and maintain forest diversity, they also confer redundancy and resilience to these same forests and, to the broader ecosystem, of which they are a central part of (Dubbin & Penn 2006).
