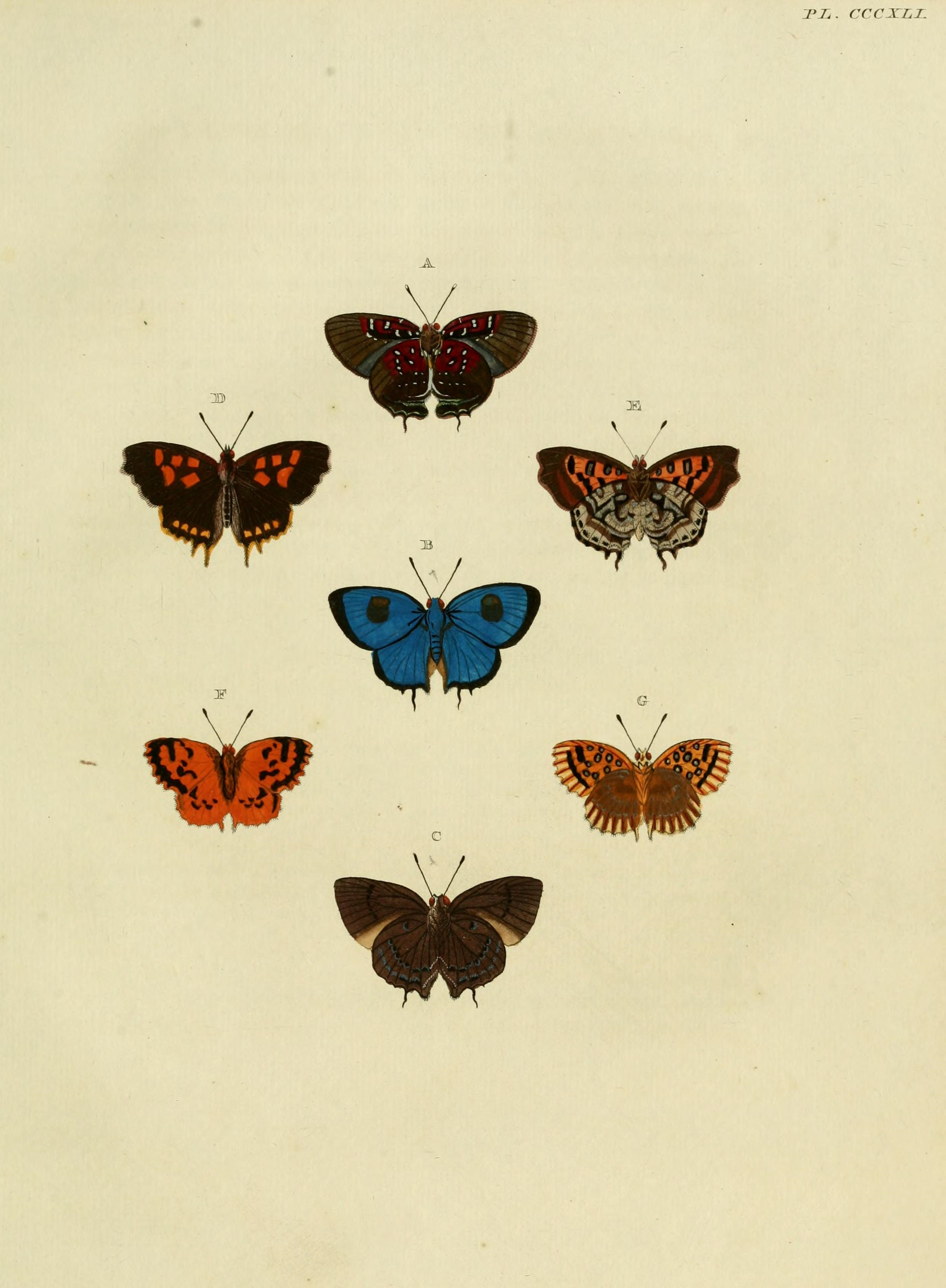
- Parrhasius polibetes in Pieter Cramer's Uitlandsche Kapellen

Scientific classification
- Kingdom: Animalia
- Phylum: Arthropoda
- Clade: Pancrustacea
- Class: Insecta
- Order: Lepidoptera
- Family: Lycaenidae
- Tribe: Eumaeini
- Genus: Parrhasius; Hübner, [1819]

Synonyms
- Eupsyche Scudder, 1876

= Parrhasius (butterfly) =

Butterfly genus in family Lycaenidae

Parrhasius is a Nearctic and Neotropical genus of butterflies in the family Lycaenidae.

== Species ==
- Parrhasius m-album (Boisduval & Le Conte, 1833)
- Parrhasius moctezuma (Clench, 1971)
- Parrhasius orgia (Hewitson, 1867)
- Parrhasius polibetes (Stoll, [1781])
- Parrhasius selika (Hewitson, 1874)
- Parrhasius urraca Nicolay, 1979
