= Vaughn Shirey =

American lepidopterist and conservation biologist

- Other names: Vaughn M. Shirey, Vaughn Michael Shirey
- Education: Drexel University (B.S., 2017); Georgetown University (Ph.D., 2023)
- Known for: LepTraits butterfly trait database
- Awards: GBIF Young Researchers Award (2020); David H. Smith Conservation Research Fellowship (2023); Harold N. Glassman Distinguished Dissertation Award (2025)
- Scientific career
- Fields: Lepidopterology, biodiversity informatics, global change biology
- Workplaces: Georgetown University; University of Southern California; Florida Museum of Natural History, University of Florida

Vaughn Shirey (also published as Vaughn M. Shirey or Vaughn Michael Shirey) is an American lepidopterist and conservation biologist. He is Assistant Curator of Lepidoptera at the McGuire Center for Lepidoptera and Biodiversity, part of the Florida Museum of Natural History at the University of Florida.

== Education ==
Shirey received a Bachelor of Science in environmental science, with a concentration in biodiversity and systematics, from Drexel University in 2017. After graduating, he held a Fulbright fellowship at the Laboratory for Integrative Biodiversity Research, Finnish Museum of Natural History, University of Helsinki, working with Pedro Cardoso on using GBIF occurrence data to assess the conservation status of spiders, including co-authoring two 2019 papers on spider conservation profiling and potential red-list assessment.

He went on to complete a Ph.D. in biology (ecology, evolution, and animal behavior) at Georgetown University in 2023, working in the Ries Lab of Butterfly Informatics under Leslie Ries on how boreal and Arctic butterfly communities in North America are responding to climate change, combining field surveys across Canada and Alaska with natural history museum records. He was a National Science Foundation Graduate Research Fellow during his doctoral studies. His dissertation received Georgetown's 2025 Harold N. Glassman Distinguished Dissertation Award in the Sciences, shared with David Saxon.

== Research and career ==
In 2020, Shirey received a GBIF Young Researchers Award for work modeling long-term changes in boreal butterfly diversity while addressing sampling bias in biodiversity occurrence data; Georgetown reported him at the time to be only the second American to receive the award.

In 2022, he was first author of "LepTraits 1.0", a dataset compiling life-history and morphological trait data for roughly 12,500 butterfly species, published in the journal Scientific Data.

From 2023, he held a David H. Smith Conservation Research Fellowship, a national postdoctoral fellowship in applied conservation science, for a project titled "Towards a Novel Integrative Framework for Rapid Conservation Assessments of Insect Decline in the Anthropocene," mentored by Laura Melissa Guzman at the University of Southern California and Robert Guralnick at the Florida Museum of Natural History, in partnership with the Xerces Society for Invertebrate Conservation and the Finnish Museum of Natural History.

In 2025, he joined the Florida Museum of Natural History as Assistant Curator of Lepidoptera, where he curates the butterfly and moth collections of the McGuire Center for Lepidoptera and Biodiversity.
