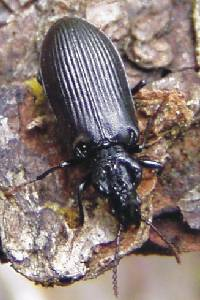

Scientific classification
- Kingdom: Animalia
- Phylum: Arthropoda
- Class: Insecta
- Order: Coleoptera
- Suborder: Polyphaga
- Infraorder: Cucujiformia
- Family: Pythidae
- Genus: Pytho; Latreille, 1796

= Pytho (beetle) =

Genus of beetles

Pytho is a genus of dead log beetles in the family Pythidae. There are about nine described species in Pytho.

== Species ==
- Pytho abieticola Sahlberg, 1875
- Pytho americanus Kirby, 1837
- Pytho depressus Linnaeus, 1767
- Pytho kolwensis Sahlberg, 1833
- Pytho niger Kirby, 1837
- Pytho nivalis Lewis, 1888
- Pytho planus Olivier, 1795
- Pytho seidlitzi Blair, 1925
- Pytho strictus LeConte, 1866
