= Sajan KC =

Nepalese entomologist

- Education: Tribhuvan University; Eastern New Mexico University (M.S., 2023)
- Known for: Taxonomy of Hemipeplinae; butterfly fauna of Nepal
- Scientific career
- Fields: Entomology, Lepidoptera, Coleoptera

Sajan KC is a Nepalese entomologist. His research focuses on the taxonomy of beetles and butterflies across South Asia, particularly the Himalayas, and the Americas. He is known for a monographic revision of the beetle subfamily Hemipeplinae and for contributions to documenting butterfly diversity in Nepal. He has also written fiction in both English and Nepali.

== Early life and education ==
KC is from Pokhara, Kaski District, Nepal. He completed his undergraduate studies at Tribhuvan University and earned a Master of Science in biology at Eastern New Mexico University in 2023, under the supervision of entomologist Darren Pollock. He is currently a Ph.D. student at the University of Florida.

== Research ==
=== Hemipeplinae ===
KC co-authored a review of the world fauna of the beetle subfamily Hemipeplinae (family Mycteridae) with Darren A. Pollock, published in Zootaxa in 2025. The paper described twenty-nine new species. The study examined about 1,000 specimens representing 59 species. Two of the new species were named in reference to the television series Breaking Bad, which is set in New Mexico: Hemipeplus heisenbergi and the Malaysian Hemipeplus saymyname.

=== Butterfly fauna of Nepal ===
KC began studying butterflies and other insects around 2017 and had studied about 280 of the 669 butterfly species then recorded in Nepal by 2020.

In 2021, he recorded the skipper Halpe aucma in Nepal for the first time. It was first noticed in Dhankuta, and further specimens were found at Bhedetar and Godawari. Examination of the male genitalia at the Nepal Agricultural Research Council's entomology research division in Khumaltar distinguished the specimens from the similar Halpe filda and Halpe molta. The species had previously been known only from northeastern India. He had earlier recorded five other species new to Nepal and was preparing a revised checklist of the country's butterflies.

KC contributed to the 2022 Annotated Catalogue of the Butterflies of Nepal and has co-authored papers on butterfly communities in the Central Himalayas (2024) and in a forest habitat in Pokhara (2025).

=== Giant skippers and Aegiale ===
In January 2023, KC and Sapkota photographed a Mexican-M hairstreak (Parrhasius moctezuma) at the National Butterfly Center in Mission, Texas, the first record of the species in the United States. A 2024 paper by the two published the record, along with a possible sighting of the tequila giant skipper (Aegiale hesperiaris) in the United States. In 2026, KC and colleagues described a new species in the genus Aegiale C. Felder & R. Felder, 1860, from Sonora, Mexico.

=== Rapala taxonomy and phylogenomics ===
In 2025, KC and colleagues published a review of the genus Rapala in Nepal, recognizing 13 species. The review recorded Rapala rosacea in Nepal for the first time and proposed Rapala hinomaru as a junior synonym of Rapala nissa. In 2026, KC, Vaughn Shirey, and Nick Grishin published a phylogenomic study of Asian Rapala based on DNA from 16 specimens representing 15 species, which suggested a new species from Myanmar.

== Books ==
=== Fiction ===
KC has written two novels: After Love, in English, and Phitkiri, in Nepali. In 2021, KC was among 22 writers recognized in Baahrakhari Media's "Best Stories 2078" (उत्कृष्ट कथा–२०७८) selection, part of the third Dish Home 12Khari story writing competition.

== Selected publications ==
=== Beetles ===
- KC, S.; Pollock, D.A. (2025). "Review of the Hemipeplinae (Coleoptera: Mycteridae) fauna of the world with descriptions of twenty-nine new species". Zootaxa. 5574 (1): 1–140. doi:10.11646/zootaxa.5574.1.1. PMID 40173889.

=== Butterflies ===
- van der Poel, P.; Smetacek, P.; Colin, S.; et al. (2022). An Annotated Catalogue of the Butterflies of Nepal. Bionotes: Occasional Paper 1. pp. vii + 241.
- KC, S.; Sapkota, A. (2022). "Additional distribution records of butterflies (Lepidoptera: Rhopalocera) with seven species new to Nepal". Biodiversitas. 23 (5): 2711–2738. doi:10.13057/biodiv/d230555.
- KC, S.; Sapkota, A. (2024). "Butterfly Diversity and Community Dynamics in the Central Himalayas: Species Composition, Richness, Abundance, and Seasonal Variation of Butterflies (Lepidoptera: Papilionoidea)". Ecology and Evolution. 14 (12) e70612. doi:10.1002/ece3.70612. PMC 11650754. PMID 39691430.
- KC, S. (2025). "An Untapped and Undocumented Butterfly Diversity in a Rapidly Urbanizing and Fragmenting Forest Habitat in Pokhara, Nepal: First Checklist and Implications for Conservation". Ecology and Evolution. 15 (8) e71937. doi:10.1002/ece3.71937. PMC 12361351. PMID 40837529.
- KC, S.; Sapkota, A. (2025). "Butterfly Fauna of Central Panama During an El Niño Period: Preliminary Insights on Diversity Patterns". Psyche: A Journal of Entomology. 2025 2097097. doi:10.1155/psyc/2097097.
- KC, S.; et al. (2026). "A new species of Tequila Giant Skipper Aegiale C. Felder & R. Felder, 1860 (Lepidoptera, Hesperiidae, Megathymina) from Sonora, Mexico". ZooKeys (1272): 157–171. Bibcode:2026ZooK.1272..157K. doi:10.3897/zookeys.1272.181963. PMC 12983079. PMID 41837207.

=== Citizen science ===
- KC, S.; Sapkota, A. (2025). "Can gamification save the planet? Revolutionizing citizen science for biodiversity conservation". Biological Conservation. 302 111001. Bibcode:2025BCons.30211001K. doi:10.1016/j.biocon.2025.111001.

== See also ==
- Hemipeplinae
- Papilionoidea
- Megathyminae
- List of butterflies of Nepal
