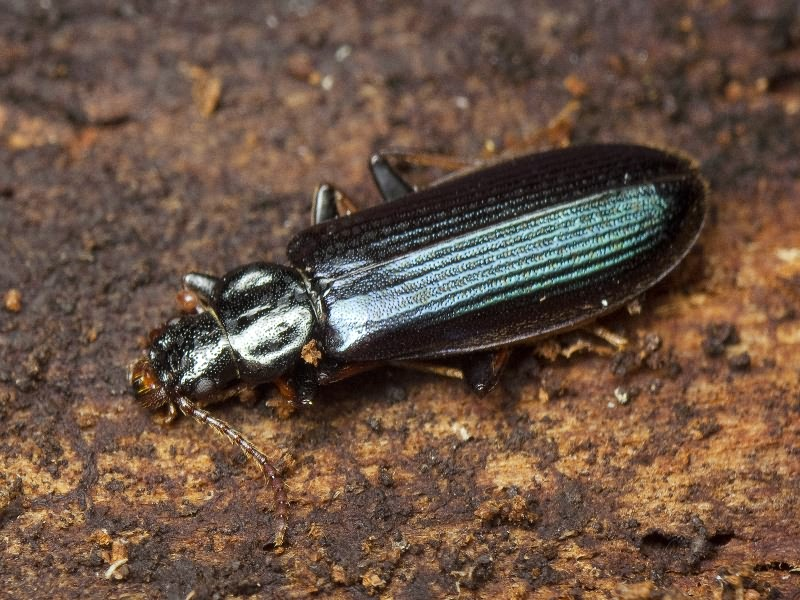
- Pytho depressus

Scientific classification
- Kingdom: Animalia
- Phylum: Arthropoda
- Clade: Pancrustacea
- Class: Insecta
- Order: Coleoptera
- Suborder: Polyphaga
- Infraorder: Cucujiformia
- Superfamily: Tenebrionoidea
- Family: Pythidae; Solier, 1834

= Pythidae =

Family of beetles

The family Pythidae is a small group of tenebrionoid beetles with no vernacular common name, though recent authors have coined the name dead log bark beetles. There are seven genera, which are largely native to the mid-high latitude regions of the Northern Hemisphere and Australia, with one genus also present in the tropical Americas. The larvae are generally found with decaying vegetation and wood on which they feed, while adults are not associated with the larvae and are generally caught using malaise traps and light traps.

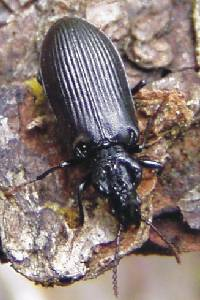
Pytho kolwensis

== Genera ==
These genera belong to the family Pythidae

- Anaplopus Blackburn, 1890 Australia
- Ischyomius Chevrolat, 1878^{g} Central America and Northern South America
- Osphyoplesius Winkler, 1915^{g} Palearctic
- Priognathus LeConte, 1850^{i c g b} North America
- Pytho Latreille, 1796^{i c g b} Holarctic
- Sphalma Horn, 1872^{i c g b} Western North America
- Trimitomerus Horn, 1888^{i c g b} North America

Data sources: i = ITIS, c = Catalogue of Life, g = GBIF, b = Bugguide.net
