= Darren Pollock =

Canadian-American entomologist

Darren A. Pollock is a Canadian-American entomologist and professor of biology at Eastern New Mexico University, known for his taxonomic work on beetles, particularly the superfamily Tenebrionoidea.

== Background ==
Pollock studied at the University of Manitoba and earned a Ph.D. from the University of Alberta in 1994. After postdoctoral work on beetle systematics and a stint studying fire ecology on the tallgrass prairie, he eventually settled at Eastern New Mexico University, where he now curates the invertebrate collection at the university's natural history museum.

== Research ==
Much of Pollock's career has gone into untangling the classification of obscure beetle families — Mycteridae, Pythidae, Pyrochroidae, Boridae, Melandryidae, Salpingidae, and their relatives — work that rarely makes headlines but quietly fills in the map of an enormous, under-studied group of insects. In a 2012 interview about a newly identified Wisconsin species, Mycterus youngi, he described a long-standing attachment to what he called "orphan beetles" — small, economically unremarkable species that "fall through the cracks" of funding and attention precisely because they don't bite, sting, or damage crops. "I just want to keep adding to the list of things we didn't know," he said.

One contribution stands out for its strangeness rather than its obscurity: a 2002 study, co-written with Benjamin Normark, on Micromalthus debilis, the telephone-pole beetle. It is the only living member of its family, and its larvae reproduce almost entirely by giving birth to more larvae without ever mating — one of the strangest life cycles known in insects. Pollock and Normark's paper remains a key reference on how that life cycle was pieced together and what it means for beetle evolution.

He also discovered the Australian beetle genus Binburrum in 1995, and in 2020, working with then-doctoral student Yun Hsiao, described three new species in the genus. In a nod to their rarity, the pair named them Binburrum articuno, B. moltres, and B. zapdos, after the "legendary birds" of the Pokémon franchise. The story spread well beyond entomology circles, picked up by dozens of outlets internationally — including USA Today, IGN, GameSpot, Kotaku, and the United Kingdom's Metro — making it, by some distance, the most widely reported moment of his career.

Other taxonomists have returned the favor: at least two beetle species have been named in his honor, including Trictenotoma pollocki Telnov & Drumont, 2020, a member of the genus Trictenotoma described from Indochina, whose published etymology credits Pollock as a leading specialist on tenebrionoid beetles.

== Selected publications ==
- Pollock, D.A. & Normark, B.B. (2002). "The life cycle of Micromalthus debilis LeConte (1878) (Coleoptera: Archostemata: Micromalthidae): historical review and evolutionary perspective." Journal of Zoological Systematics and Evolutionary Research 40(2): 105–112.
- Pollock, D.A. (1991). "Natural history, classification, reconstructed phylogeny, and geographic history of Pytho Latreille (Coleoptera: Heteromera: Pythidae)." Memoirs of the Entomological Society of Canada 123(S154): 3–104.
- Bukejs, A., Alekseev, V.I. & Pollock, D.A. (2019). "Waidelotinae, a new subfamily of Pyrochroidae (Coleoptera: Tenebrionoidea) from Baltic amber of the Sambian peninsula." Zootaxa 4664(2): 261–273.
- Hsiao, Y. & Pollock, D.A. (2021). "Contribution to the knowledge of the endemic Australian genus Binburrum Pollock, 1995 (Coleoptera: Pyrochroidae: Pilipalpinae), with description of three new species." The Canadian Entomologist.
