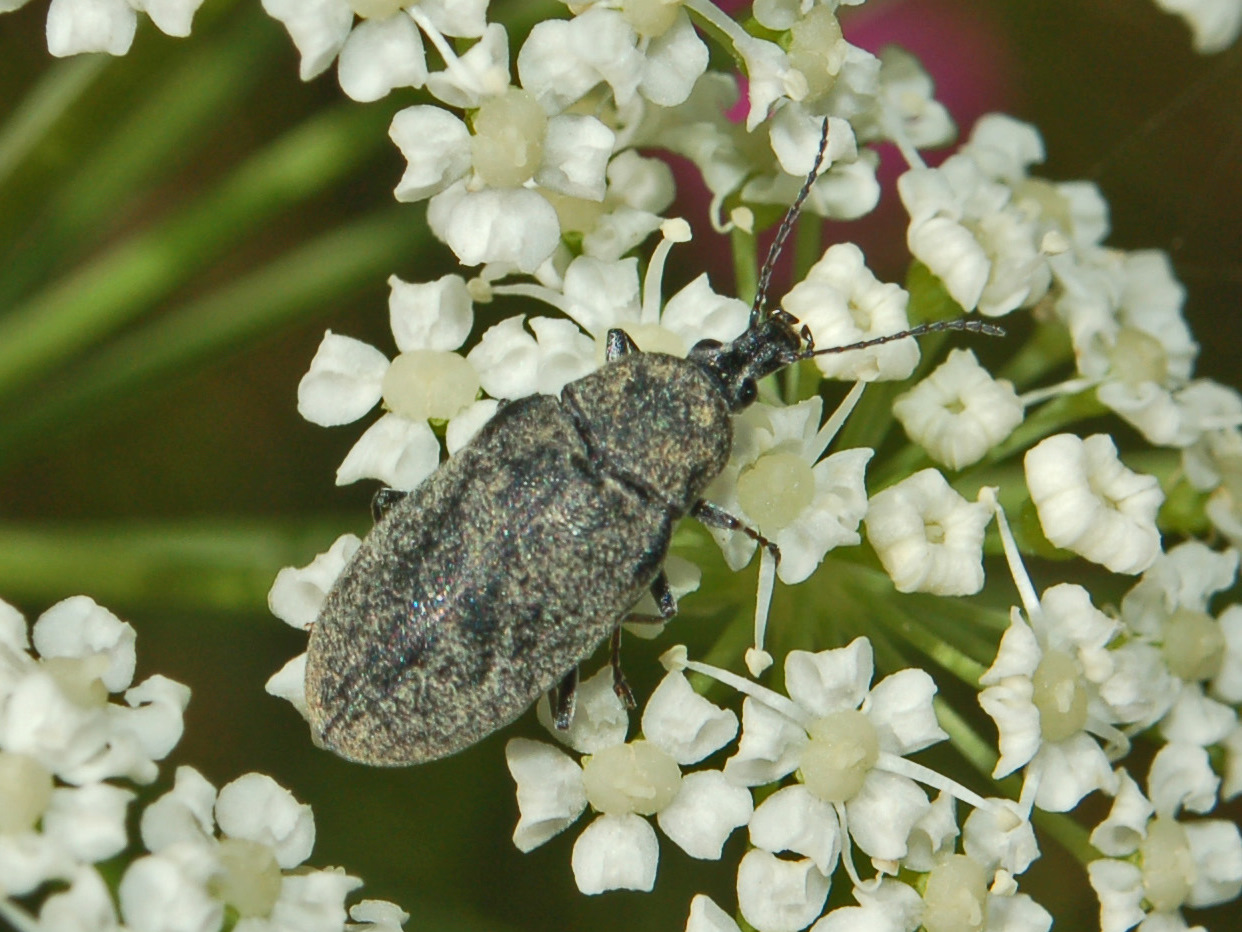
- Mycterus curculioides

Scientific classification
- Kingdom: Animalia
- Phylum: Arthropoda
- Clade: Pancrustacea
- Class: Insecta
- Order: Coleoptera
- Suborder: Polyphaga
- Infraorder: Cucujiformia
- Superfamily: Tenebrionoidea
- Family: Mycteridae; Blanchard, 1845

Genera
- See text

= Mycteridae =

Family of beetles

The family Mycteridae is a small group of tenebrionoid beetles with no vernacular common name, though recent authors have coined the name palm and flower beetles. The family Mycteridae is distributed worldwide. There are about 30 genera and 160 species in three subfamilies Mycterinae, Hemipeplinae and Eurypinae (= Lacconotinae). These 3 subfamilies are extremely diverse in appearance and it is difficult to diagnose the adults at the family level. About 20 species are found in Australia, and species of three genera are found in North America (Mycterus, Hemipeplus and Lacconotus). The larvae are generally flattened and typically inhabit the spaces between leaves or the bases of fronds, where they appear to consume fungi.
