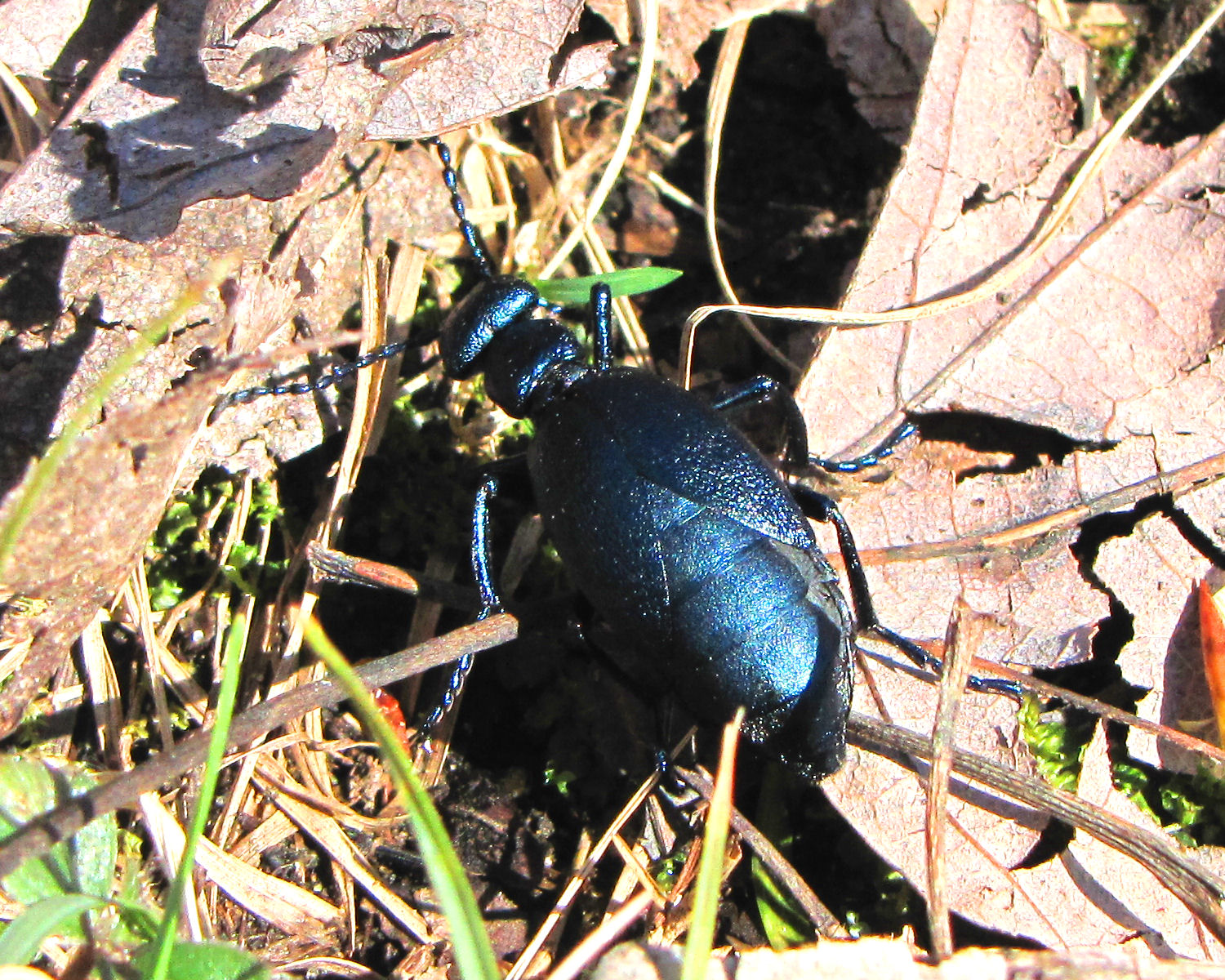
- Meloe angusticollis

Scientific classification
- Kingdom: Animalia
- Phylum: Arthropoda
- Class: Insecta
- Order: Coleoptera
- Suborder: Polyphaga
- Infraorder: Cucujiformia
- Family: Meloidae
- Genus: Meloe angusticollis Say, 1824

= Meloe angusticollis =

Short-winged blister beetle

Species of beetle

Meloe angusticollis, commonly known as the short-winged blister beetle or oil beetle, is a species of blister beetle, native to North America. They average 9-19 mm (0.35-0.75 inches) in length — females are much larger than males. When disturbed the adult releases oily droplets of hemolymph from its body to repel potential predators, which may cause blistering on human skin.

== Description ==
Meloe angusticollis is black or metallic blue. Extremely short and sparse setae matching integument color. Head is moderately to densely punctate. Pronotum is moderately to densely punctate; scutellum conically produced. Elytra are short, not reaching end of abdomen. Legs each have an outer metathoracic tibial spur with apical portion produced anteriorly.

The moderate to dense punctation on the head and pronotun, and the presence of a conically produced scutellum readily distinguishes M. angusticollis from the other Meloe species.

Blister beetles release a toxic secretion called cantharidin, which causes skin blisters and deters predators. Cantharidin is highly toxic to humans, with just 100 milligrams being potentially fatal if ingested. Historically used in medicine as the aphrodisiac Spanish fly, its use has declined due to its dangers.

Nuthatches (birds in the genus Sitta) have been observed using blister beetles by rubbing them around tree cavity entrances to repel animals, likely due to the beetles' toxic secretion.

== Life cycle ==
Blister beetles undergo complete metamorphosis, which includes egg, larva, pupa, and adult stages. The first larval stage, known for its mobility and well-developed legs, is much different from later stages — a process called hypermetamorphosis. Meloe angusticollis larvae hitchhike on bees to reach food sources like bee nests. As the larvae progress they become engorged with reduced mobility, focusing on feeding and growth. After overwintering as late-stage larvae they enter the pupal stage, transitioning into adults. Typically there is one generation per year.

== Distribution ==
This species is active primarily during spring and early summer across the northern half of the United States and southern Canada.

== Predators ==
Natural enemies of the short-winged blister beetle are fire-colored beetles, including Pedilus impressus and Pedilus terminalis which have been observed on adult short-winged blister beetles. P. terminalis has been observed eating the elytra of the blister beetle. Pedilus lugubris and Pedilus collaris have also been observed on adult blister beetles.
