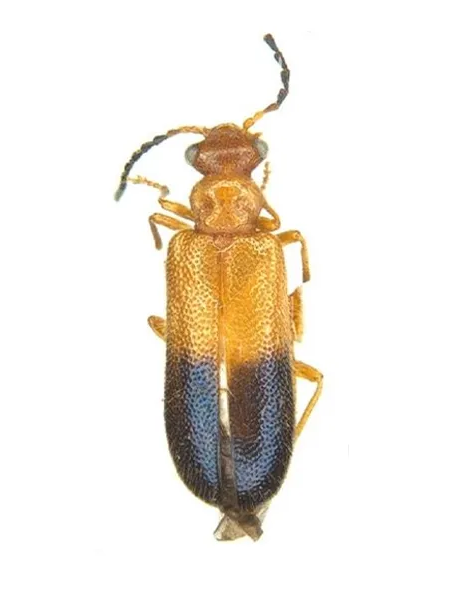
- Binburrum moltres

Scientific classification
- Kingdom: Animalia
- Phylum: Arthropoda
- Clade: Pancrustacea
- Class: Insecta
- Order: Coleoptera
- Suborder: Polyphaga
- Infraorder: Cucujiformia
- Family: Pyrochroidae
- Subfamily: Pilipalpinae
- Genus: Binburrum

= Binburrum =

Genus of insects

Binburrum is a genus of beetles belonging to the small family of fire-coloured beetles, Pyrochroidae. They are found only in Australia. Larvae of the genus are found under moist bark of dead trees, including celerytop logs. Adults may be found around foliage and light.

== Species ==
- Binburrum angusticollis (Pollock, 1995)
- Binburrum articuno (Hsiao and Pollock, 2020)
- Binburrum bifoveicollis (Lea, 1917)
- Binburrum concavifrons (Pollock, 1995)
- Binburrum ephippiatum (Wilson, 1926)
- Binburrum moltres (Hsiao and Pollock, 2020)
- Binburrum ruficollis (Champion, 1895)
- Binburrum zapdos (Hsiao and Pollock, 2020)

The species B. articuno, B. zapdos, and B. moltres were named after legendary birds in the Pokémon franchise due to one of the discoverers having a childhood interest in the franchise and the rarity of the three species.
