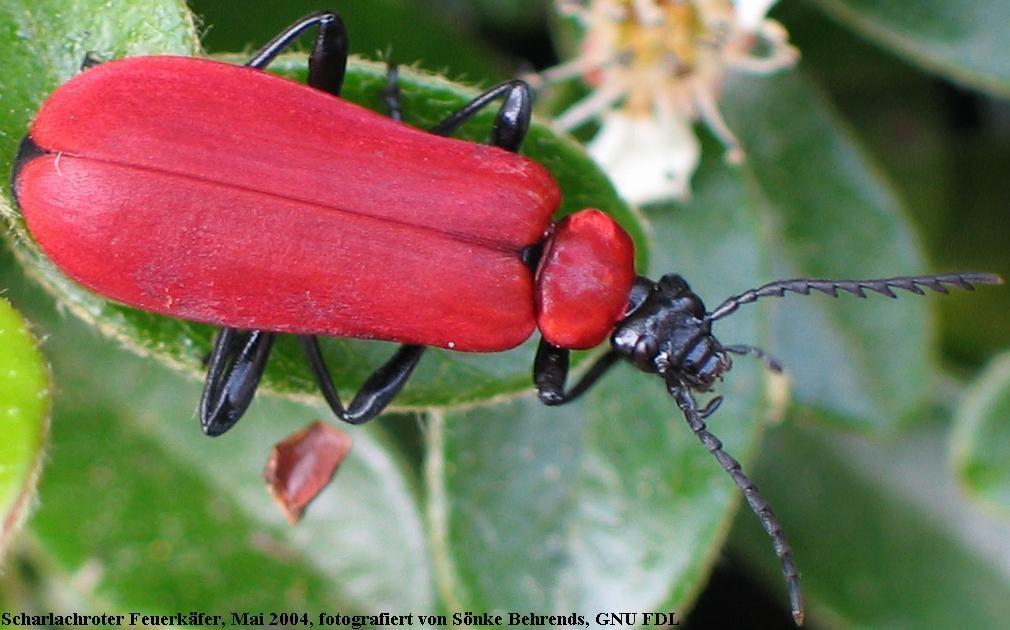

Scientific classification
- Kingdom: Animalia
- Phylum: Arthropoda
- Clade: Pancrustacea
- Class: Insecta
- Order: Coleoptera
- Suborder: Polyphaga
- Infraorder: Cucujiformia
- Family: Pyrochroidae
- Genus: Pyrochroa
- Species: P. coccinea

Binomial name
- Pyrochroa coccinea Linnaeus, 1762

= Cardinal beetle =

Species of beetle

Pyrochroa coccinea, commonly known as the Black-headed cardinal beetle, is a species of cardinal beetle in the family Pyrochroidae. It is found mainly in wooded areas and pastures throughout central Europe, including southern Great Britain. Similar to other species of ambrosia beetles, P. coccinea live and reproduce on wooden logs in early stages of decomposition. Larvae develop over the span of many years, with overlapping generations often inhabiting a single wooden territory. Adults, however, are short-lived and exist during a brief season. They typically show up in April, become more populous in May and early June, and become very rare in the remaining months.

== Geographic range ==
In Europe, Pyrochroa coccinea is found in mainly the central regions but its presence also expands south to the Pyrenees, central Italy, and Greece; north to southern Scandinavia and the United Kingdom; and east to Ukraine, western Russia, and Kazakhstan.

Pyrochroa coccinea is widespread in southern England and is most commonly found in the southeastern regions. It is found more locally and sporadically in northern regions toward the Lake District and expands well into the Welsh Border Counties. This species is found to a lesser extent in southwest England, northern into southern Cumbria, and is generally not found in the West Country and western Wales, nor in Scotland.

== Morphology ==
=== Adults ===
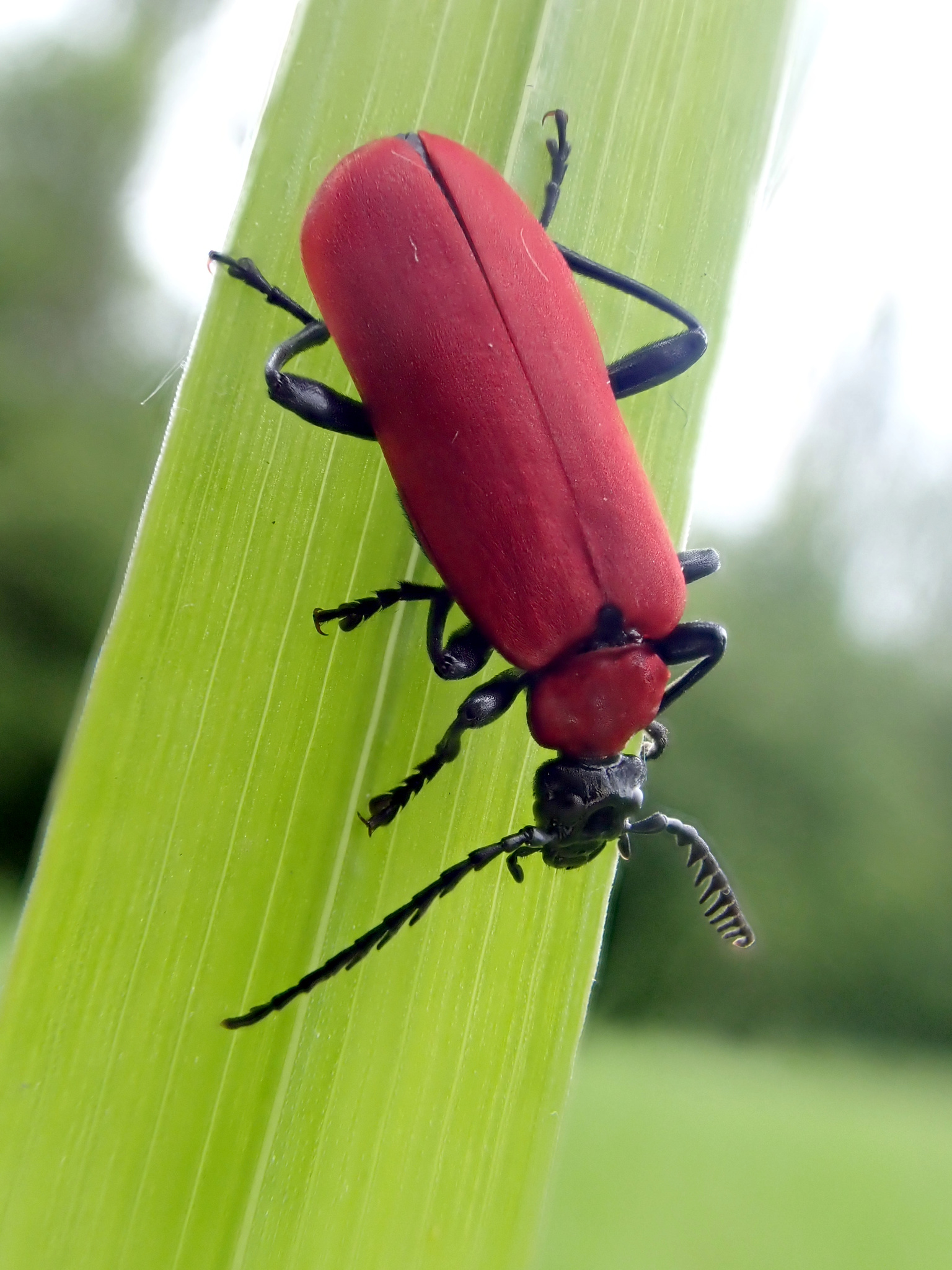
Adult Cardinal beetle

This species is large, with an average length of 14–20 mm. Its pronotum and elytra are distinctively brightly coloured and smooth, with either a red or scarlet colour or shiny black. Compared to the red-headed common cardinal beetle (Pyrochroa serraticornis), this species is distinct in that its head is black with feathery antennae, its pronotum and elytra are characteristically structured, and it is larger and deeper blood red in colour. Adult P. coccinea has evolved aposematic coloration which serves as a protective mechanism as the beetles disperse, given that its notable bright red coloration is known to be toxic to predators.

=== Larvae ===
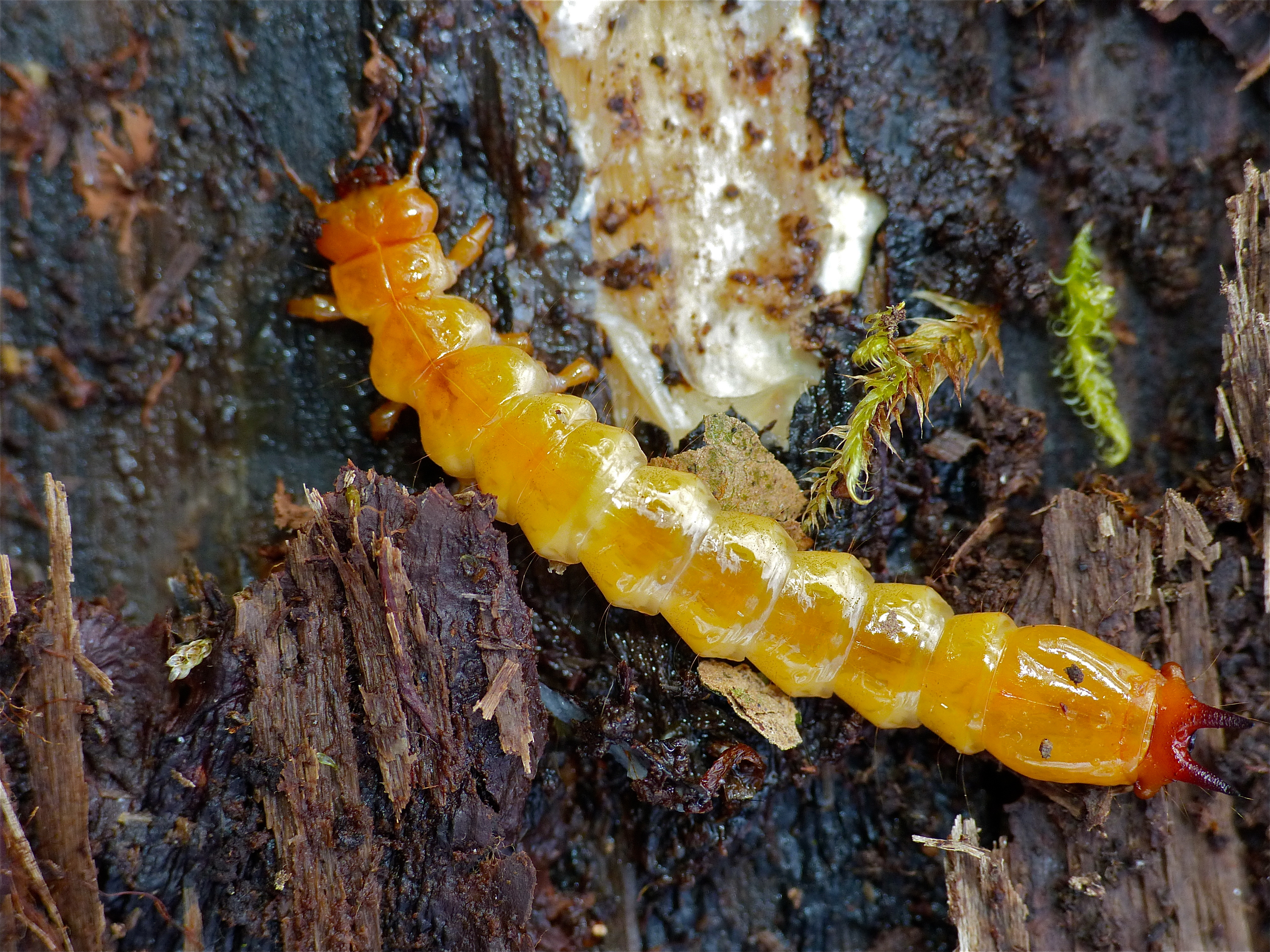
Cardinal beetle larva

The larvae are distinguishable based on colour, as they are creamy grey or yellow. The larvae are also elongated and flattened in shape, and each thoracic and abdominal segment is distinctively rounded. Extending from each thoracic segment is a pair of short legs, with the eighth tergite containing a perpendicular raised line at its base that is otherwise absent in P. serraticornis. The final abdominal segment also has a pair of hardened, straight urogomphi, which allows these beetles to crawl in between the narrow crevices of wood and bark to establish their habitat.

=== Sex differences ===
There are distinctive anatomical features present in each sex. Males contain antennae pectinate and have a deep indentation between the eyes, whereas females contain antennae serrates and have a much shallower depression between its eyes.

== Habitat ==
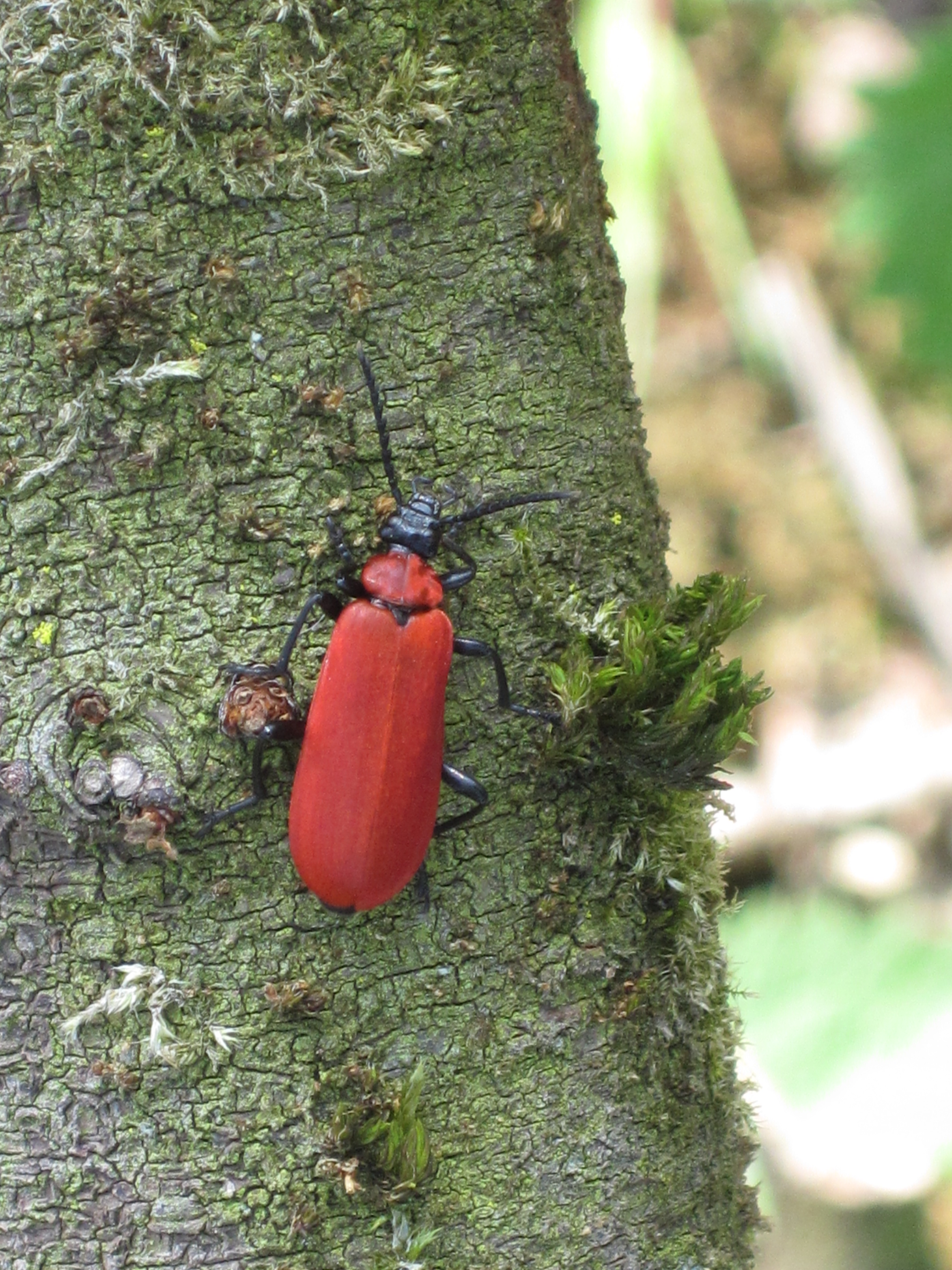
Cardinal beetle on bark

Pyrochroa coccinea is active during the day (diurnal) and inhabits vascular plant species in wooded environments under the bark of decaying broad-leaved timber and fallen logs. P. coccinea is less likely to be found in wooded areas with increased sun exposure, but its presence is unaffected by microhabitat factors such as the moisture or humidity within the tree bark. This species also does not have an obvious preference for different tree species, and its presence is unaffected by factors such as diameter, bark coverage, or the presence of fungi. This is in contrast to many species of Ambrosia beetles that live mutualistically in wooded areas with a fungal source.

Larvae mature over the span of many years and therefore require a habitat with abundant host resources.

Adults have a short life span and only exist during limited months of the year, typically showing up in April, becoming the most populous throughout May and June, declining in July, and appearing only very rarely in the remaining months.

== Feeding behaviour and diet ==
While these beetles inhabit fallen timber, they are active during the day and live an exposed lifestyle easily detectable by predators and researchers. Larvae develop in small groups and feed upon the decomposing wood, nearby dead insects, and their own faeces as well as microorganisms inhabiting the wooded debris. However, when these beetles are highly populous, this species has been found to engage in cannibalism.

Adults are predatory and, in contrast to larvae, feed primarily on many different small insects living within the nearby foliage, as well as flowers and pollen.

== Life cycle ==
Because it takes larvae many years to fully develop, there are often many overlapping generations simultaneously inhabiting a single wooded area. Small larvae typically develop under narrower bark areas, but the bark slackens as they grow and develop. This allows the developing larvae to find groupings of other large larvae within these more spacious regions that are filled with debris. This property of fallen timber also explains why this is where females choose to lay their eggs, as the bark initially remains solid, stably containing the eggs, until it eventually loosens once the eggs hatch and larvae begin to grow in size.

Once adults appear from underneath the tree bark, they remain confined to the host material and will often mate during this period. Adults eventually disperse by flying and can be found among foliage within a small distance from their native logs.

In contrast to adults, larvae are present throughout the entire year but preferentially pupate in the spring once they are fully developed.

== Chemical signaling ==
Semiochemicals are chemical agents that facilitate communication between either members of the same or different species. Cantharidin (CTD) is a type of semiochemical that has different actions based on which species are relying on it for communication. CTD is a type of terpene, which is a volatile unsaturated hydrocarbon found in the essential oils of plants. CTD specifically is naturally produced by blister beetles and false blister beetles, and it is highly toxic such that it strongly discourages predators and parasites from feeding on these beetles throughout all stages of their development. Even though CTD is highly poisonous, it actually lures some arthropods known as canthariphilous species. These species can sense the blister and false blister beetles producing CTD and manipulate the compound to convert it into a defensive material.

This canthariphilous mechanism involving transforming the properties of CTD is common within the Pyrochidae family, where it functions as a pheromone for males and females in close proximity and is an important factor in sexual selection. All species within the Pyrochroa genus are drawn toward specifically blister beetles, and P. coccinea has previously been observed feeding on Melo brevicollis, Meloe proscarabaeus, and Melo violaceus.

== Reproduction ==
=== Sexual anatomy ===
Specifically, CTD interacts with specialized glands found only in specific male anatomical structures. In this glandular cranial apparatus, CTD is released as secretions that are consumed by females when males are courting them, inducing sexual intercourse. In males, this cranial structure is located in the frontal region and contains one indentation extending to a modest depth in between the eyes. However, in different genera of Pyrochroinae, the structure can vary from a single shallow indentation interocularly, to two matching indentations behind the eyes, to a bulging frontal ledge in the frontoclypeal region.

The head also contains distinctive cuticular ducts that enter and pass through the cuticular wall of the structure, both of which are involved in transporting the chemicals produced by the secretory cells. These two different kinds of ducts comprise two different types of ectodermal glands.

=== Copulation ===
After males ingest CTD, the male gradually approaches the female following a brief settling phase and presents itself face to face. The male and female proceed to approach each other and interact by touching their antennae, where the male positions its antennae sideways. This allows the cranial structure to be exposed to the female, and she immediately tests it out with her mouth anatomical structures. The male proceeds to mount the female and begin copulating, securely grasping the female's body and the level of the pronotum and elytra and forcing his open mandibles onto the pronotum. Following the conclusion of copulation, the male orients itself face to face once again to the female, revealing his cranial structure repeatedly, allowing the female to test the apparatus again and potentially consume the secretions. This repeated sampling of the apparatus is a relatively unusual post-copulatory behaviour. This is because when gifts are imparted by males, it typically occurs before or during copulation, rather than after.

=== Mating preferences & oviposition ===
Although this species does not have a significant preference for the tree species that it inhabits, mating occurs most frequently on the decomposing bark of broadleaf wooded plants, including oak and beech trees, as well as fallen timber. Reproduction takes place early in the season of the adult beetle's presence (mainly during the early spring months). Females lay their eggs in small groups and primarily beneath the wood and rarely on upright trunks where they will have access to feed on nearby insects.
