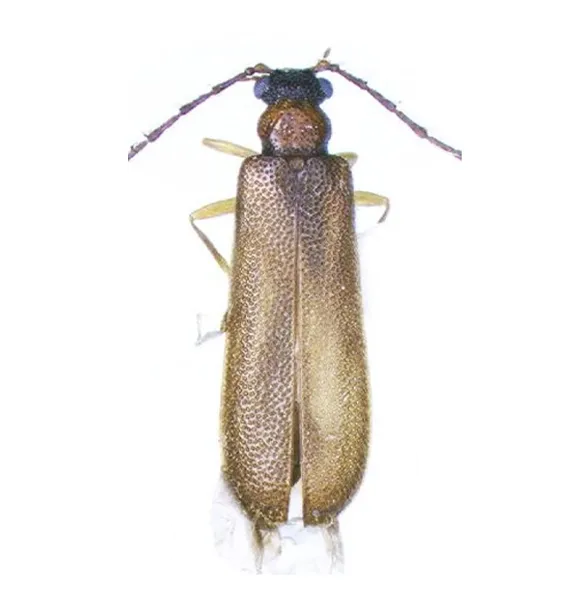
- A member of the Binburrum articuno species

Scientific classification
- Kingdom: Animalia
- Phylum: Arthropoda
- Clade: Pancrustacea
- Class: Insecta
- Order: Coleoptera
- Suborder: Polyphaga
- Infraorder: Cucujiformia
- Family: Pyrochroidae
- Genus: Binburrum
- Species: B. articuno

Binomial name
- Binburrum articuno Hsiao & Pollock, 2020

= Binburrum articuno =

Species of beetle named after fictional animal Articuno

Binburrum articuno is a species of beetle endemic to Australia.

== Habitat ==
Larvae are found under moist bark of dead trees, including celerytop logs. Adults may be found around foliage and light.

== Appearance ==
Binburrum articuno is less than a foot long with two half-ellipse shaped elytras or forewings that have hundreds of black spots all over them. It has two transparent hind wings. As do all insects, it also has six legs, these are yellow. It has two brown anntennae made up of segments. It has two blue compound eyes on the sides of the face.

== In popular culture ==
It is named after the fictional creature Articuno from the pop culture franchise Pokémon. It was named alongside other beetles from the same genus, Binburrum zapdos and Binburrum moltres, by Darren Pollock and Yun Hsiao. Because these beetles were named after notable Pokémon, these species saw above average media coverage upon being named.

== See also ==
- Fauna of Australia
- List of organisms named after works of fiction
