= Tump 39 =

Repurposed former Royal Arsenal magazine

Tump 39, formerly known as 5N F39, is a disused and repurposed munitions site constructed originally by the Royal Arsenal, located at Dolphin Close in north Thamesmead, London, England. It was used during both world wars and was eventually repurposed for public recreational access, before being shut to the public in the 1990s and re-opened again in 2023 by Three Rivers for organized community events and other recreational use.

Three Rivers, directed by Scott Burrel, is a local community arts organization in the London Borough of Bexley hosted by the Peabody Trust which collaborates with the Friends of Tump 39, a volunteer group who facilitate the site and orchestrate local events and workshops. They work with the Zoönomic Institute as part of the Zoöp movement, and have been known to also collaborate with artists Blanc Sceol, foraging advocacy project Right For Weeds, artist and cook Maia Magoga, soil and alternative sanitation co-op Compost Mentis, and Ed Webb-Ingall for the production of a film about the site.

== History ==
In the 1880s, the Royal Arsenal developed two new high explosives: cordite, to propel shells out of guns, and lyddite, to serve as the destructive component of those shells. Both of these materials are inherently stable but can explode devastatingly if exposed to fire, and so were stored in large amounts in allocated magazines. These magazines were constructed far apart due to the volatile nature of the materials being stored, and were connected by an extensive railway system. A total of 14 magazines were constructed, covering 1,800 square feet on the Plumstead and Erith marshes in the mid-1890s. The land was privately-owned and each Magazine was built with a moat and high brick wall, serving to deter unauthorized entry, protect explosive materials from fire traveling inward and supply water for firefighting. The earth embankments were also designed to direct explosions upwards in the event of one occurring. The temperature of the magazines was affected by the Royal Arsenal's boiler houses via heating pipes and their roofs were painted white to reflect sunlight. The Royal Arsenal hit its zenith in 1916, possessing over 1,100 buildings extending over 3 miles long and 1 mile wide, all of which were surrounded by electrified fences and high walls.

One of these magazines, located in what would eventually become Thamesmead, was called 5N F39 (later Tump 39). The "5N" stood for "Magazine 5, reserved for Naval Use", whereas "F39" served as the address of the magazine in the Royal Arsenal's internal directory. 5N F39 was built in 1887 and in use until the end of WW2. It was used to store cartridges and bulk cordite under the supervision of Royal Arsenal Police and magazine foremen.

So much ammunition was manufactured and handled by the Royal Arsenal that the magazines were eventually unable to store all of it. Around 172 buildings were dedicated to storing these munitions, amassing a total of 40,000 tons of explosives at its peak. This amount of explosive material was sufficient to level neighboring areas such as Greenwich, Woolwich, Belvedere, Erith and half of north Kent, raising concerns.

Air raids during WW1 caused the gradual relocation of the magazines to remote sites, a process which took over 40 years. By the 1960s the Royal Arsenal was winding down, with marshland at the eastern end sold to the London County Council for the construction of Thamesmead. It's around this time the term "tump" became used to refer to the magazine sites, where 5N F39 would then become known as Tump 39.

Tump 39 was adapted by the Greater London Council in 1987 for public recreational use, seeing the incorporation of a bridge, pathways, stairs, railings, bird-watching facilities, decked areas and lighting. The site was locked up and shut off to the public in the 1990s, where it became largely forgotten, the entrance concealed in the housing estate of Dolphin Close. Throughout the following decades, the site would become overgrown with vegetation.

In 2023, the community arts organization Three Rivers, supported by the Peabody Trust, worked with the voluntary Friends of Tump 39 group to become a Zoöp, a model as part of a Dutch initiative overseen by the Zoönomic Institute in Rotterdam which involves taking non-human life into consideration when making decisions. An individual, dubbed the Speaker for the Living, is assigned to serve the role of representing animals, plants and other living things in a given group, with the current Speaker for the Living of Tump 39 being J D Swann. Three Rivers is the first UK organization to adopt this model. The Friends of Tump 39 group can be joined for free by anybody via an online form.

The site was furthermore utilized to host various community-oriented workshops and events, which are free with offered concessions such as free vegetarian meals. The first public event held in Tump 39 after its closure during the 1990s was in the summer of 2023 where artist duo Blanc Sceol collaborated with local residents to co-create an imaginary world and alternative environment for the engagement of those attending via radical listening, somatic explorations and sonic meditation. Over the span of 4 months, the community utilized the space for recreational activities such as drawing, singing, dancing and sharing of meals. The event also included the construction of instruments from sticks, stones and leaves, as well as the accompaniment of Orbit, a unique instrument designed and made by Blanc Sceol in collaboration with master luthier Kai Tönjes as part of an improvised performance to thank Tump 39 for hosting them.

The next event thereafter would be hosted between June and August 2024, starting with a workshop titled "The Gift of Blackberries" which focused on the botanical abundance of the site. Further events and workshops would be hosted up until present day, where local inhabitants and other visitors would engage in educational workshops, documenting the local wildlife, help plan, facilitate and build on-site infrastructure and brainstorm future courses of action related to the site.

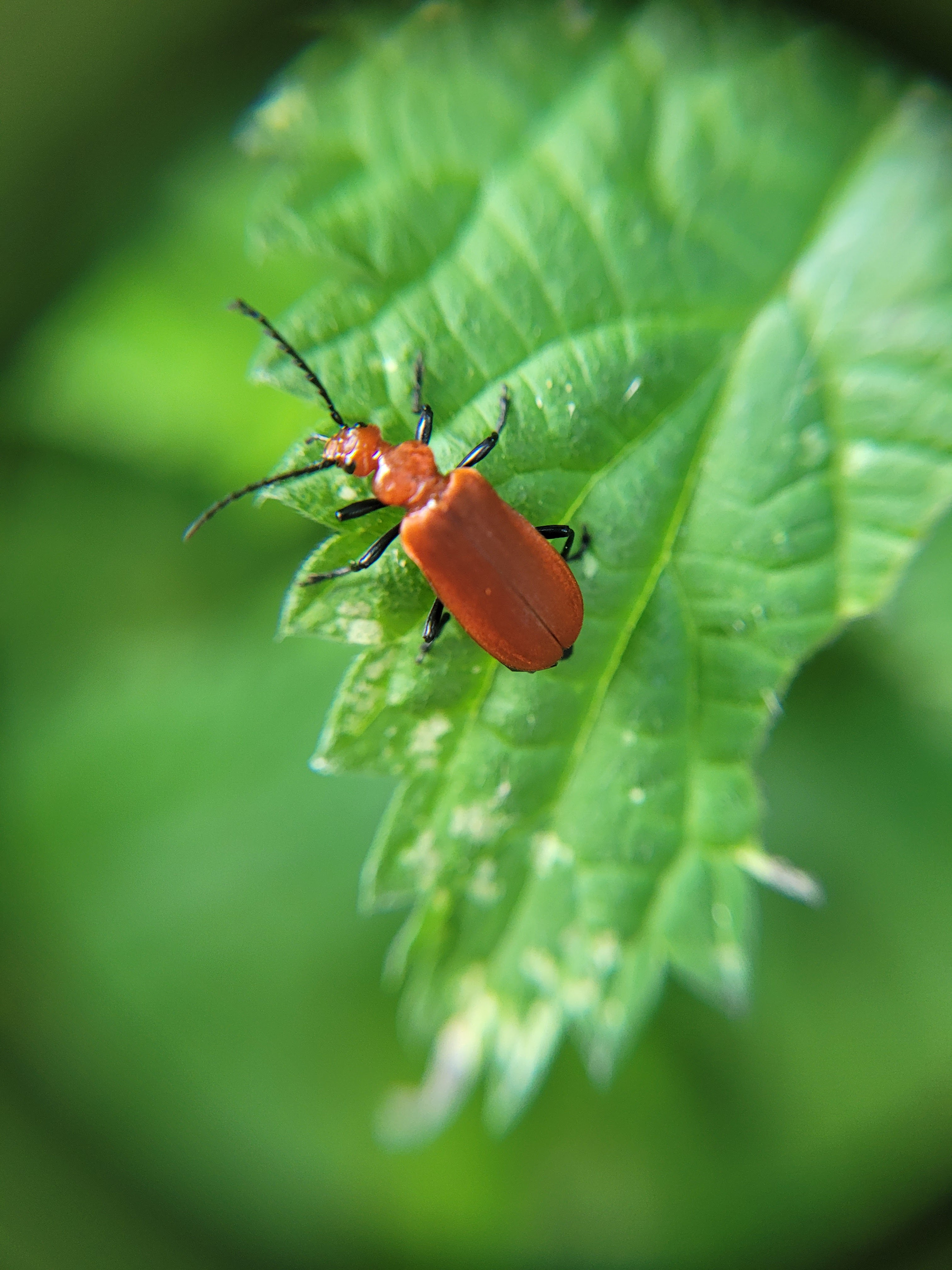
Red-Headed Cardinal Beetle sat on a leaf at Tump 39, 19th May 2024.

On the 29th June a workshop was held which focused on educating visitors on composting and soil care, as well as co-designing and building a new compost toilet for the site.

On the 24th October 2024, artist, filmmaker and researcher Ed Webb-Ingall, with support from artist Rhea Storr, released a film titled "From Dolphin Close" which anecdotally explored the social dynamics and impetus of community formation, especially regarding Tump 39 and its volunteers. The film was first shown at FormaHQ, Pervil Garden Studios in London, where Webb-Ingall and Rhea Storr discusssed the making and thematics of From Dolphin Close and how collaboration is enacted and questioned in their filmmaking practices. From Dolphin Close was quoted by Webb-Ingall as being inspired by a 1972 film titled "All You Need's an Excuse", which documents a similar project in Beckton, which Webb-Ingall chose to shoot with a 16mm film with a Bolex camera, the same kind of camera used to shoot the original film. Doing this limited him to 30 seconds of continuous filming and a total of six minutes worth of footage each time he had visited Tump 39 up until that point.

On October 20, 2025, Three Rivers was awarded £1 million funding as a significant grant as part of the Arts Council England's Creative People and Places Portfolio. The fund supported it to deliver its new Hello Earth Project over the following 3 years. Funds would also be invested in developing the South East Way, a group of 12-18 year-olds who run their own stage in Thamesmead Festival.
