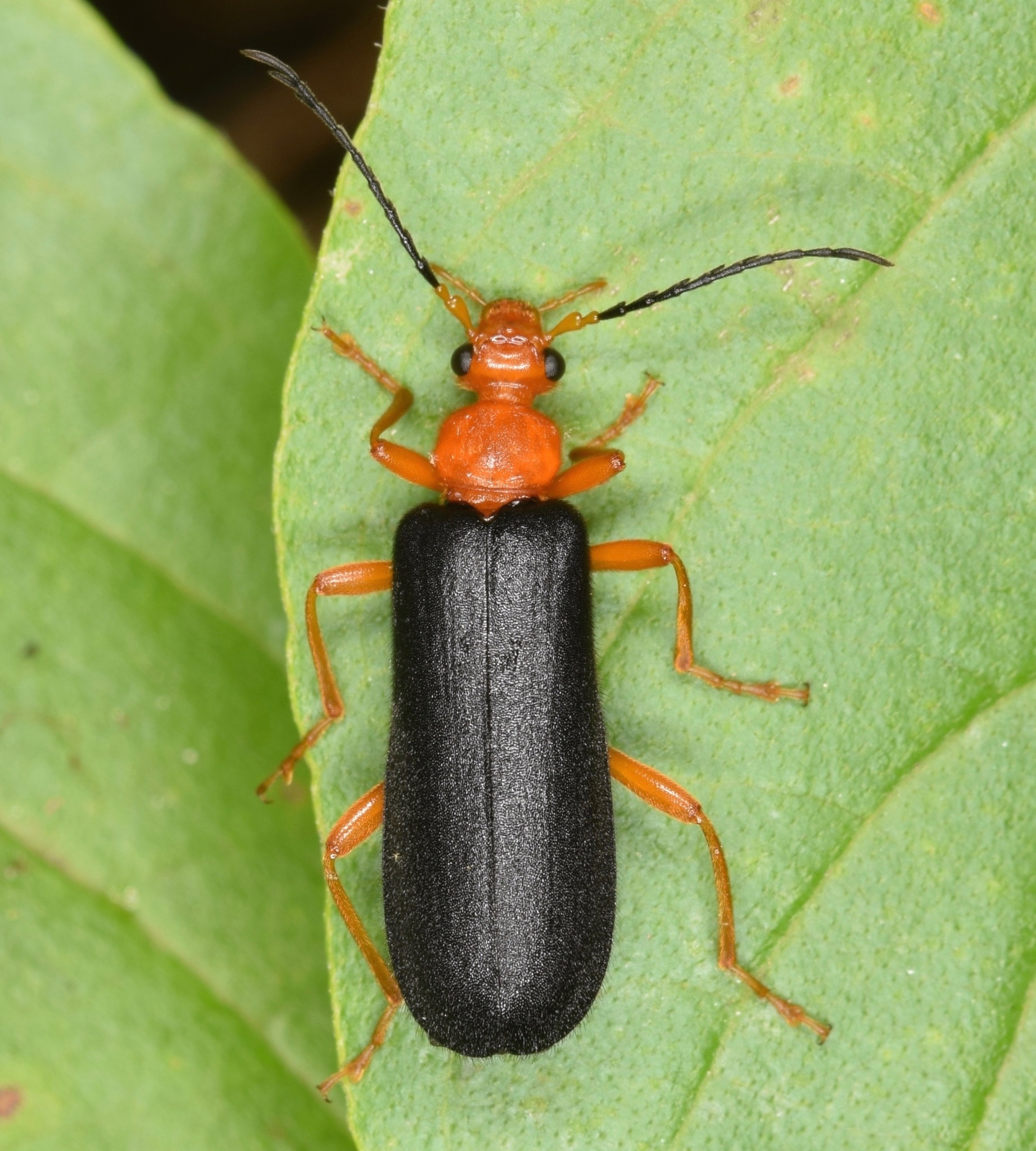

Scientific classification
- Domain: Eukaryota
- Kingdom: Animalia
- Phylum: Arthropoda
- Class: Insecta
- Order: Coleoptera
- Suborder: Polyphaga
- Infraorder: Cucujiformia
- Family: Pyrochroidae
- Genus: Neopyrochroa
- Species: N. flabellata

Binomial name
- Neopyrochroa flabellata Fabricius, 1787

= Neopyrochroa flabellata =

Species of beetle

Neopyrochroa flabellata is a species of fire-coloured beetles in the genus Neopyrochroa. The species' range is the eastern United States.

== Habitat ==
Larvae live in dead wood and feed on fungus rather than being predatory or eating the wood in which it lives. Adults rarely eat but have been known to be attracted to cantharidin.
