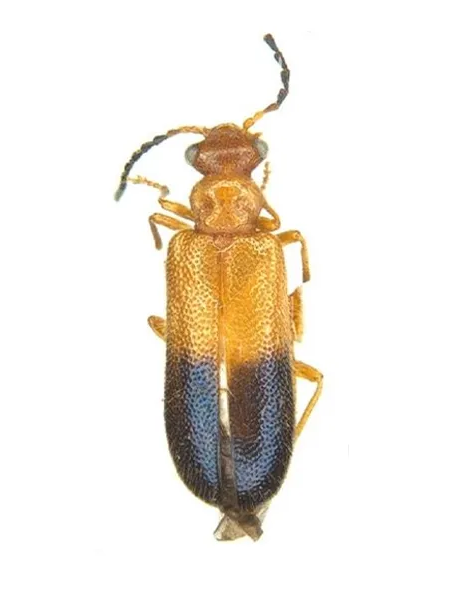
- A member of the Binburrum moltres species

Scientific classification
- Kingdom: Animalia
- Phylum: Arthropoda
- Class: Insecta
- Order: Coleoptera
- Suborder: Polyphaga
- Infraorder: Cucujiformia
- Family: Pyrochroidae
- Genus: Binburrum
- Species: B. moltres

Binomial name
- Binburrum moltres Hsiao & Pollock, 2020

= Binburrum moltres =

Species of beetle

Binburrum moltres is a species of beetle within the Binburrum genus. The species is endemic to South Australia and is named after the Pokémon Moltres.

== Taxonomy ==
Binburrum moltres is a species of beetle in the family Pyrochroidae. The species was first described in 2020 by Dr. Darren Pollock, a professor of entomology at Eastern New Mexico University, and Yun Hsiao, a Ph.D. student at Australian National University. The species was initially discovered by Hsiao during a review of the Australian National Insect Collection, who reported to and later published the discovery with Pollock. The species' epithet, 'moltres' is based upon the Pokémon franchise's legendary bird Moltres. This species was discovered alongside Binburrum articuno, and Binburrum zapdos, named after the Pokémon Articuno and Zapdos, respectively.

According to Hsiao, the choice to name this species after a legendary bird was a reference to both Moltres' rarity in the Pokémon games, and the beetle's rarity in the wild.

== Description ==
Binburrum moltres has a distinct golden top-half and a black colored bottom half.

== Distribution and habitat ==
Due to very few specimen having been collected, the species is considered rare in the wild. Binburrum moltres is native to southeastern South Australia.

== See also ==
- List of organisms named after works of fiction
