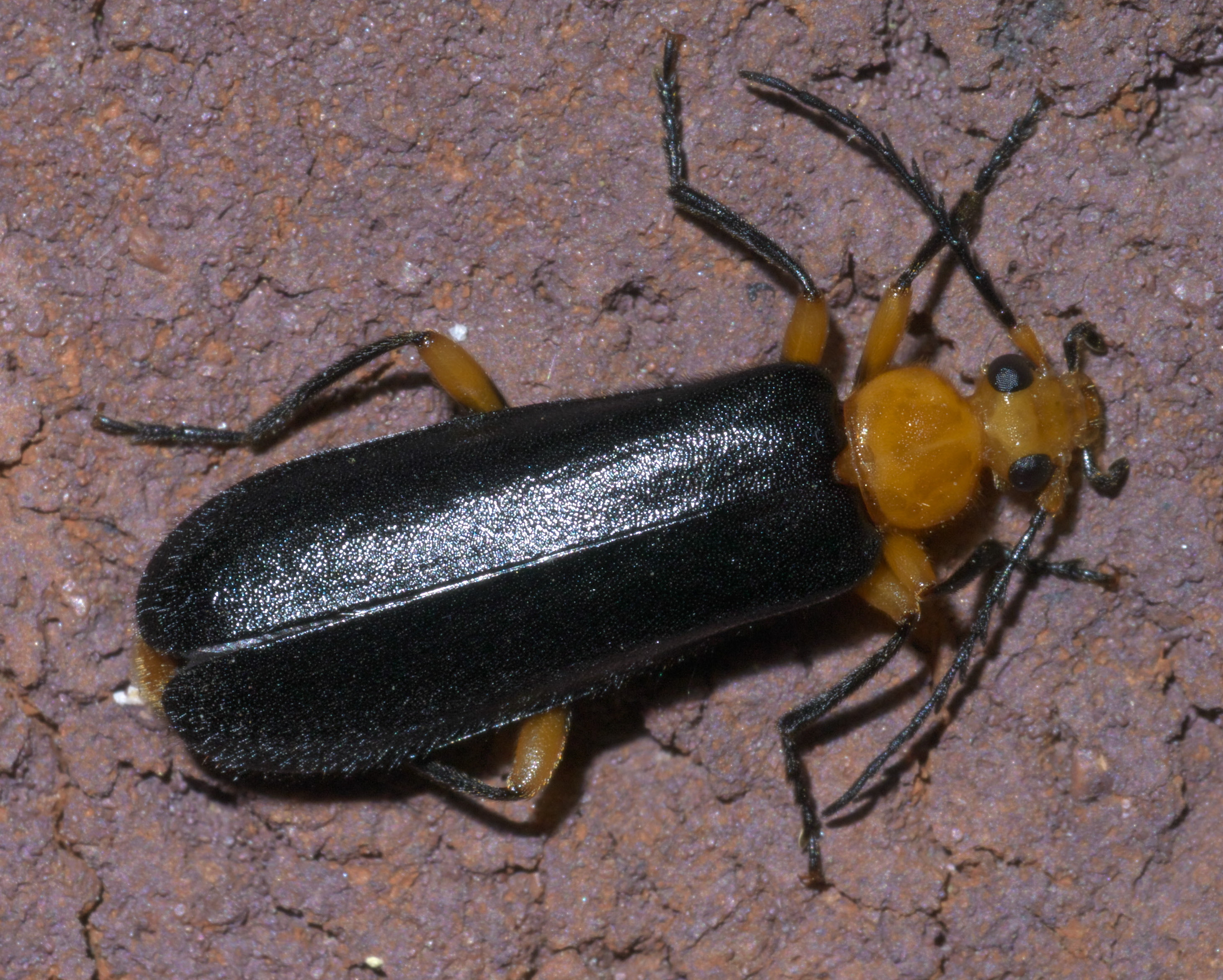

Scientific classification
- Domain: Eukaryota
- Kingdom: Animalia
- Phylum: Arthropoda
- Class: Insecta
- Order: Coleoptera
- Suborder: Polyphaga
- Infraorder: Cucujiformia
- Family: Pyrochroidae
- Genus: Neopyrochroa
- Species: N. femoralis

Binomial name
- Neopyrochroa femoralis (LeConte, 1855)

= Neopyrochroa femoralis =

Species of beetle

Neopyrochroa femoralis is a species of fire-colored beetle in the family Pyrochroidae.

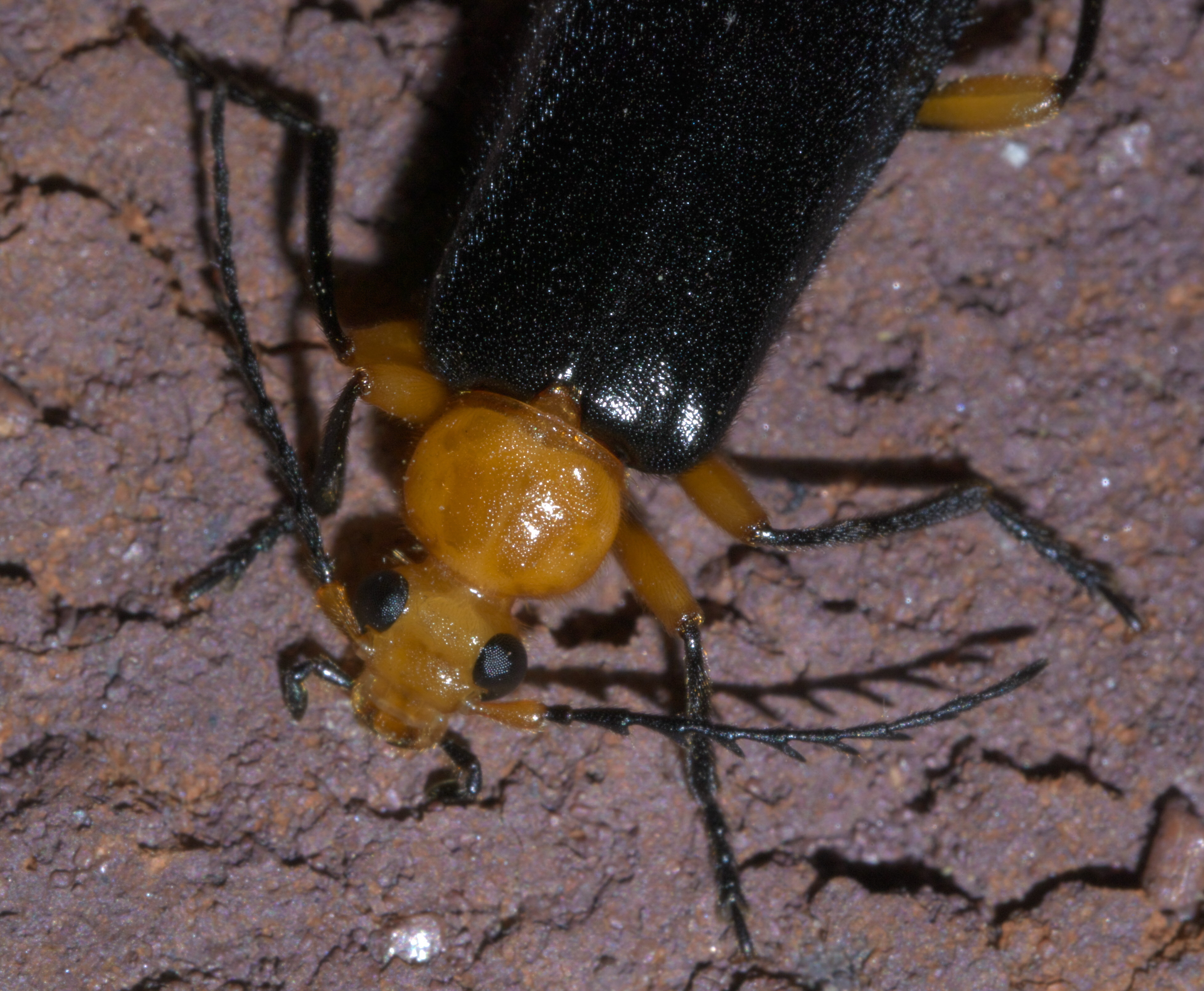
