= Pedilus abnormis =

Scientific classification
- Domain: Eukaryota
- Kingdom: Animalia
- Phylum: Arthropoda
- Class: Insecta
- Order: Coleoptera
- Suborder: Polyphaga
- Infraorder: Cucujiformia
- Family: Pyrochroidae
- Genus: Pedilus
- Species: P. abnormis

Binomial name
- Pedilus abnormis (Horn, 1874)

Species of beetle

Pedilus abnormis is a species of fire-colored beetle in the family Pyrochroidae, located in North America.
