= Ranomafana (beetle) =

Scientific classification
- Domain: Eukaryota
- Kingdom: Animalia
- Phylum: Arthropoda
- Class: Insecta
- Order: Coleoptera
- Suborder: Polyphaga
- Infraorder: Cucujiformia
- Family: Pyrochroidae
- Subfamily: Pilipalpinae
- Genus: Ranomafana; Pollock, 1995

Genus of insects

Ranomafana is a genus of beetles belonging to the family Pyrochroidae.

Species:

- Ranomafana steineri Pollock, 1995
