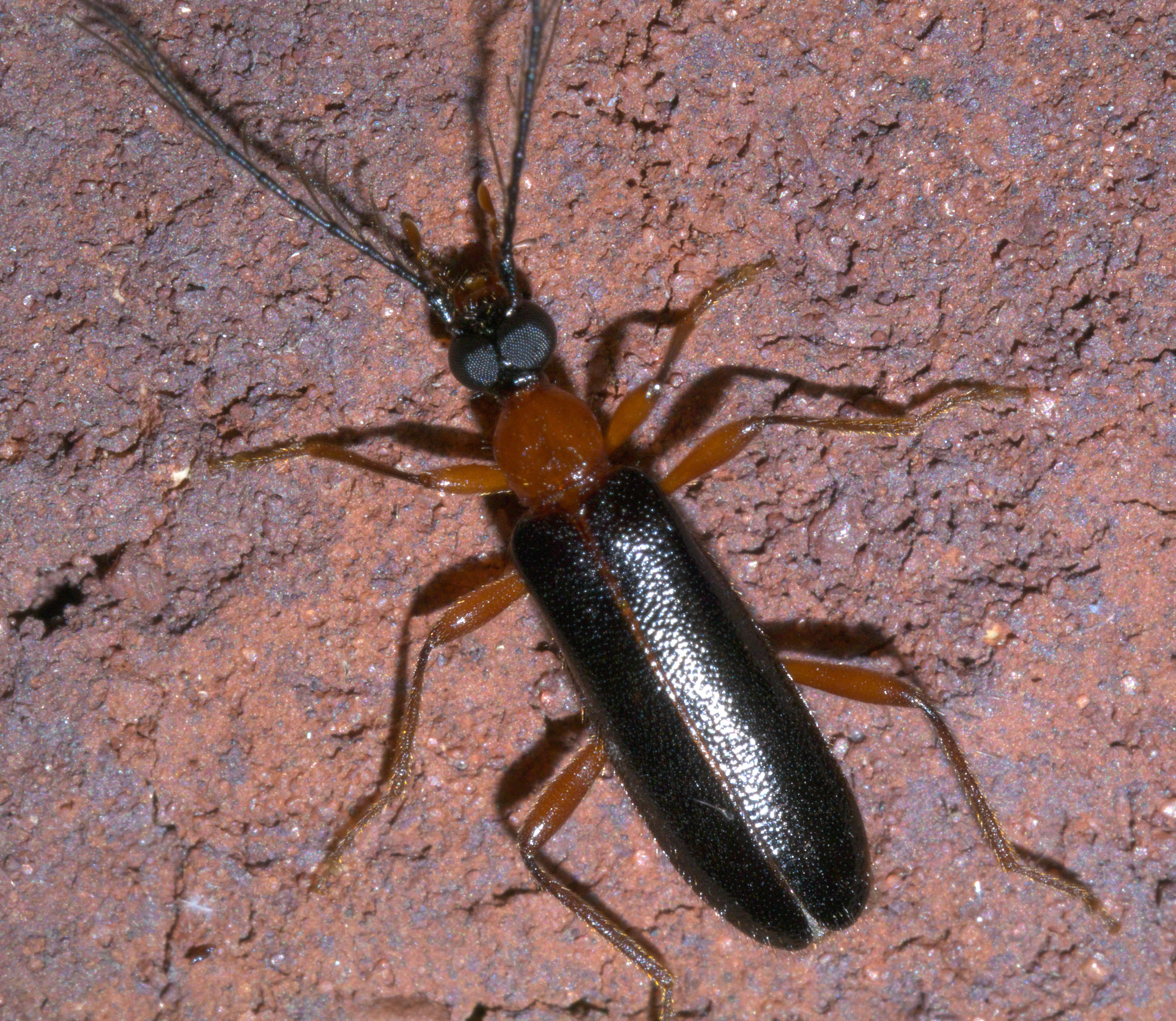
- Dendroides canadensis

Scientific classification
- Domain: Eukaryota
- Kingdom: Animalia
- Phylum: Arthropoda
- Class: Insecta
- Order: Coleoptera
- Suborder: Polyphaga
- Infraorder: Cucujiformia
- Family: Pyrochroidae
- Subfamily: Pyrochroinae
- Genus: Dendroides; Latreille, 1810

= Dendroides =

Genus of beetles

Dendroides is a genus of fire-colored beetles in the family Pyrochroidae. There are about seven described species in Dendroides.

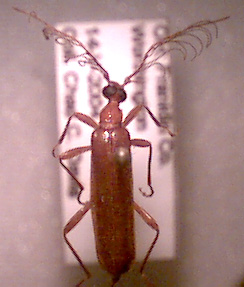
Dendroides concolor

== Species ==
These seven species belong to the genus Dendroides:

- Dendroides canadensis Leconte (fire-colored beetle)
- Dendroides concolor (Newman, 1838)
- Dendroides ephemeroides (Mannerheim, 1852)
- Dendroides marginata Van Dyke, 1928
- Dendroides marginatus Van Dyke, 1928
- Dendroides picipes Horn, 1880
- Dendroides testaceus LeConte, 1855
