= Pedilus impressus =

Scientific classification
- Domain: Eukaryota
- Kingdom: Animalia
- Phylum: Arthropoda
- Class: Insecta
- Order: Coleoptera
- Suborder: Polyphaga
- Infraorder: Cucujiformia
- Family: Pyrochroidae
- Genus: Pedilus
- Species: P. impressus

Binomial name
- Pedilus impressus Say, 1827

Species of beetle

Pedilus impressus, known as the spring fire-coloured beetle, is a species of fire-colored beetle in the family Pyrochroidae, which is native to North America. It has been found in Quebec and Ontario.
