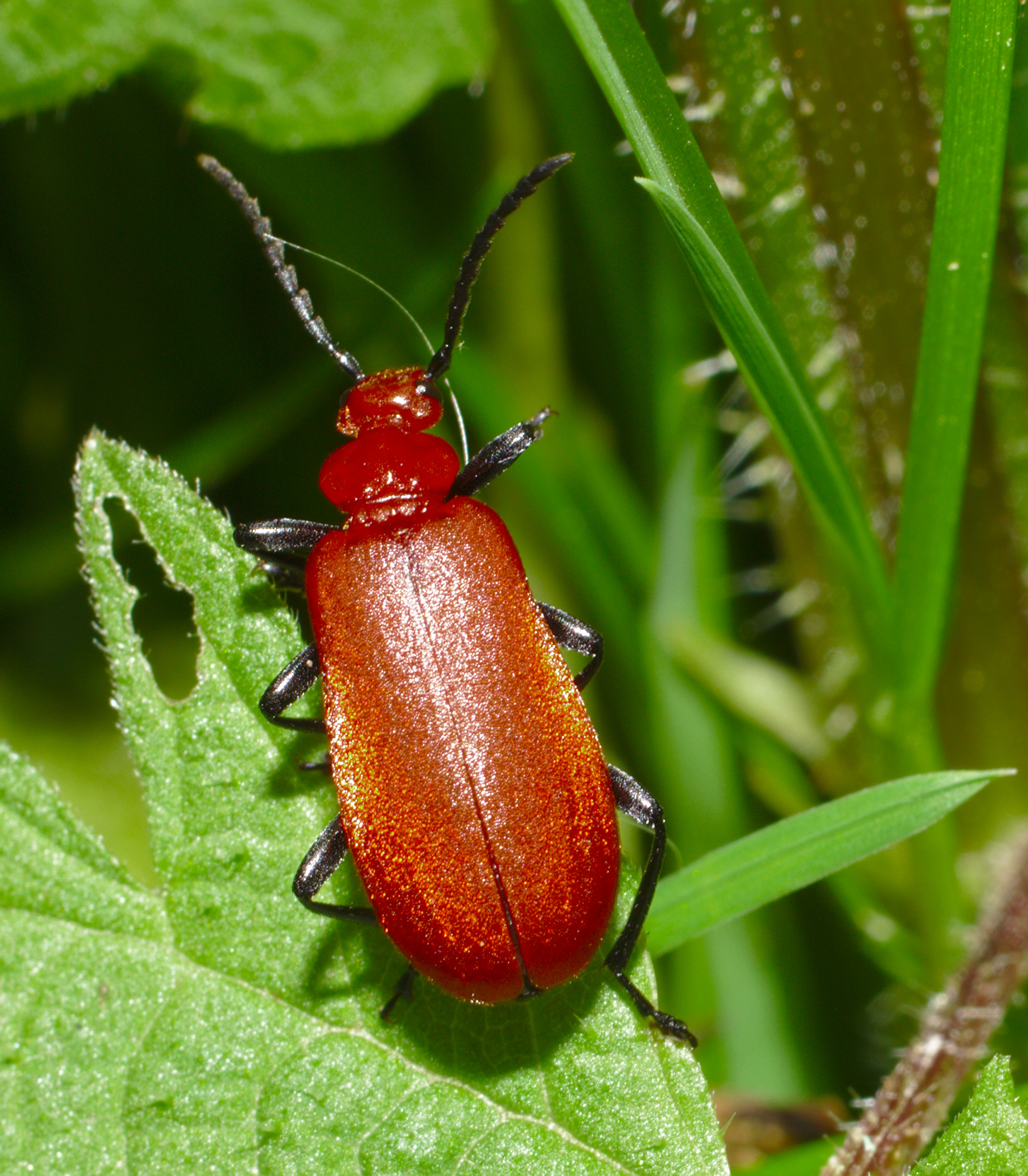
- Pyrochroa serraticornis, France

Scientific classification
- Kingdom: Animalia
- Phylum: Arthropoda
- Clade: Pancrustacea
- Class: Insecta
- Order: Coleoptera
- Suborder: Polyphaga
- Infraorder: Cucujiformia
- Family: Pyrochroidae
- Genus: Pyrochroa
- Species: P. serraticornis

Binomial name
- Pyrochroa serraticornis (Scopoli, 1763)

= Pyrochroa serraticornis =

Species of beetle

Pyrochroa serraticornis, the cardinal beetle, is a species of fire-colored beetle in the family Pyrochroidae. It is found in Europe. Population from Germany and Eastern Europe belong to the cryptic species Pyrochroa bifoveata Molfini, Mancini & Bologna 2022.
