= Pilipalpinae =

Scientific classification
- Kingdom: Animalia
- Phylum: Arthropoda
- Clade: Pancrustacea
- Class: Insecta
- Order: Coleoptera
- Suborder: Polyphaga
- Infraorder: Cucujiformia
- Family: Pyrochroidae
- Subfamily: Pilipalpinae; Abdullah, 1964

Diversity
- 12 genera

Synonyms
- Techmessinae Paulus, 1971

Subfamily of beetles

The beetles of the subfamily Pilipalpinae belong to the small family of fire-coloured beetles (Pyrochroidae). They are found only in the Southern Hemisphere, occurring in Australia, Chile, Madagascar and New Zealand. Most of the genera are small or even monotypic, but it is highly likely that a number of undescribed species exist.

== Genera ==
- Binburrum
- Cycloderus
- Exocalopus
- Incollogenius
- Malagaethes
- Morpholycus
- Paromarteon
- Pilipalpus
- Ranomafana
- Techmessa
- Techmessodes
- Temnopalpus
