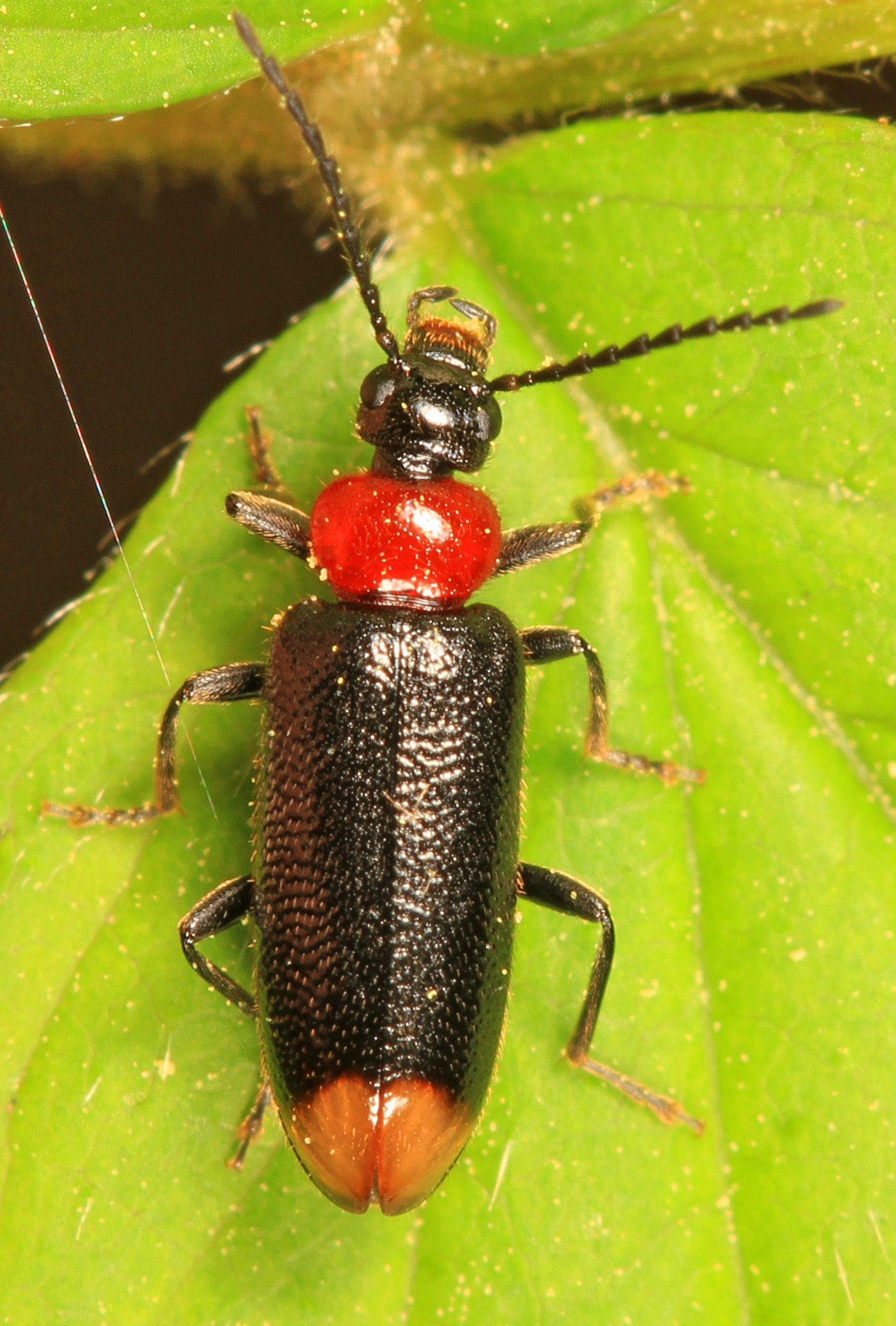
- Pedilus terminalis

Scientific classification
- Domain: Eukaryota
- Kingdom: Animalia
- Phylum: Arthropoda
- Class: Insecta
- Order: Coleoptera
- Suborder: Polyphaga
- Infraorder: Cucujiformia
- Family: Pyrochroidae
- Subfamily: Pedilinae
- Genus: Pedilus; Fischer von Waldheim, 1820

= Pedilus =

Genus of beetles

Pedilus is a genus of fire-colored beetles in the family Pyrochroidae. There are at least 20 described species in Pedilus.

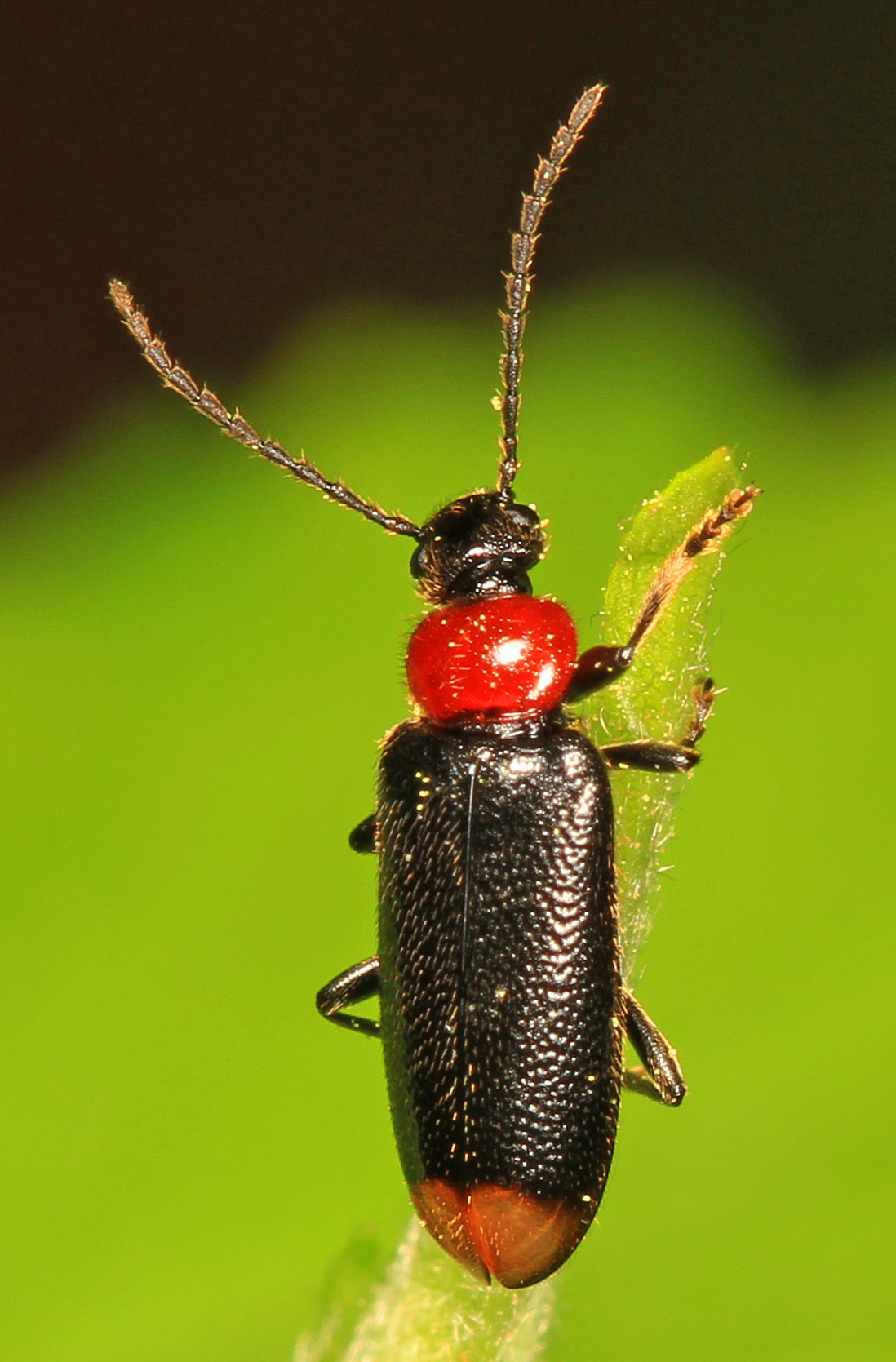
Pedilus terminalis

== Species ==
These 23 species belong to the genus Pedilus:

- Pedilus abnormis (Horn, 1874)^{g b}
- Pedilus bardii (Horn, 1874)^{b}
- Pedilus canaliculatus (LeConte, 1866)^{g b}
- Pedilus cavatus Fall, 1915^{b}
- Pedilus cyanipennis Bland, 1864^{g}
- Pedilus elegans (Hentz, 1830)^{g b}
- Pedilus flabellatus (Horn, 1883)^{g b}
- Pedilus flexiventris Fall, 1915^{b}
- Pedilus fuscus Fisher von Waldheim, 1822^{g}
- Pedilus impressus (Say, 1826)^{g}
- Pedilus inconspicuus (Horn, 1874)^{g b}
- Pedilus joanae^{b} (manuscript name)
- Pedilus labiatus (Say, 1827)^{b}
- Pedilus laevicollis Reitter, 1901^{g}
- Pedilus lewisii (Horn, 1871)^{b}
- Pedilus longilobus Fall, 1915^{g}
- Pedilus lugubris Say^{i c g b}
- Pedilus oregonus Fall, 1915^{g}
- Pedilus parvicollis Fall, 1919^{b}
- Pedilus punctulatus LeConte, 1851^{g b}
- Pedilus rubricollis Motschulsky, 1858^{g}
- Pedilus terminalis (Say, 1827)^{g b}
- Pedilus weberi Reitter, 1901^{g}

Data sources: i = ITIS, c = Catalogue of Life, g = GBIF, b = Bugguide.net
