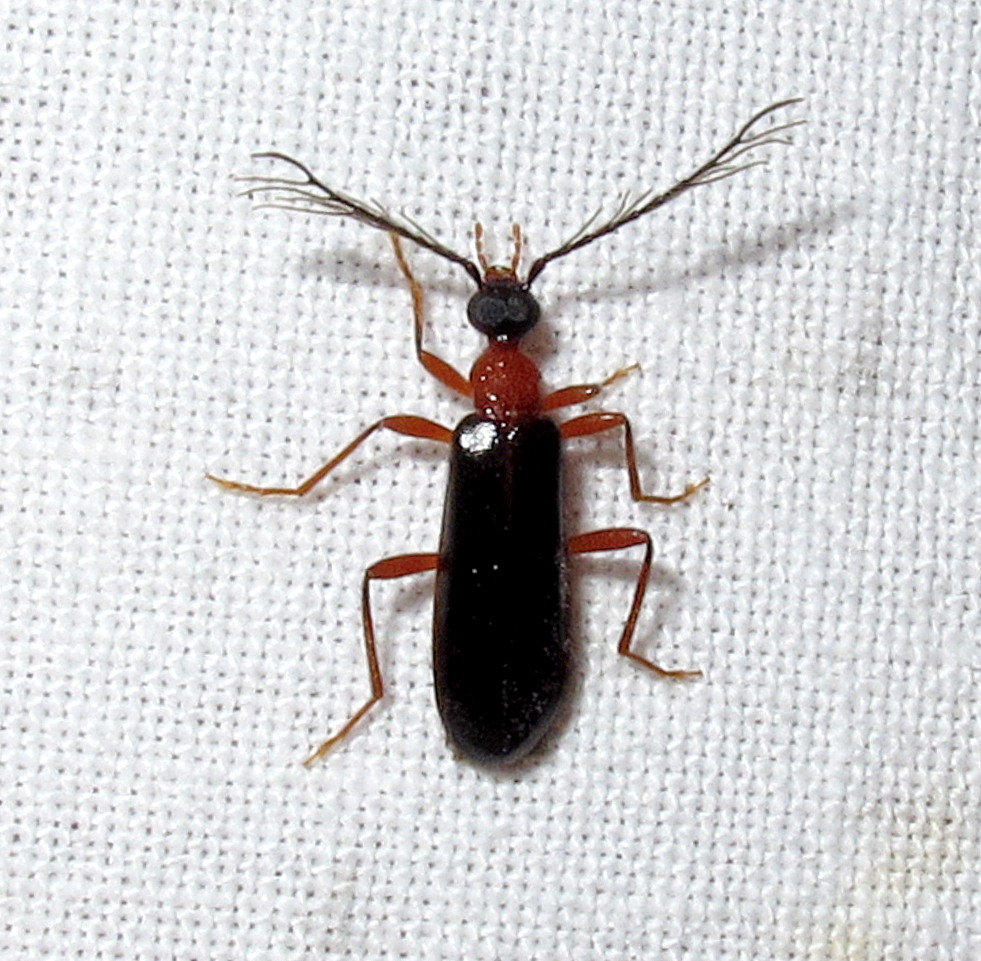
- Adult male
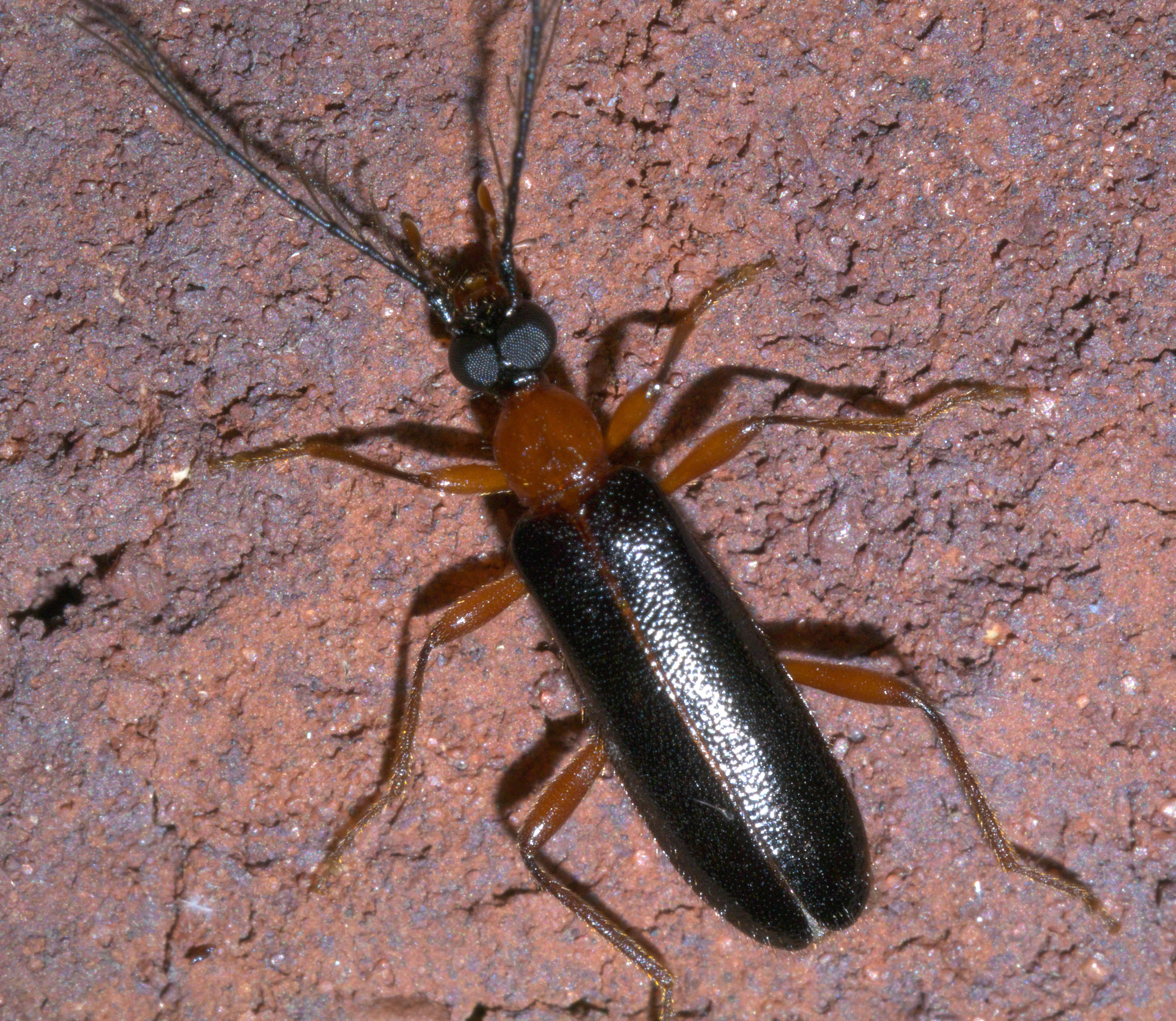
- Adult female

Scientific classification
- Kingdom: Animalia
- Phylum: Arthropoda
- Class: Insecta
- Order: Coleoptera
- Suborder: Polyphaga
- Infraorder: Cucujiformia
- Family: Pyrochroidae
- Genus: Dendroides
- Species: D. canadensis

Binomial name
- Dendroides canadensis Latreille, 1810

= Dendroides canadensis =

Species of beetle

Dendroides canadensis, the fire-colored beetle, is a species of fire-colored beetle in the family Pyrochroidae from southeastern Canada and the eastern and central United States. This beetle has both the adaptations of freezing tolerance and freezing susceptibility (supercooling).

== Description ==
The adult Dendroides canadensis is from 7 to 16 mm (0.28 to 0.63 in) long. The head and elytra are black, while the thorax and legs are reddish-brown. The antennae are pectinate (comb-like), and the compound eyes are very large, being contiguous in the male and almost united in the female. The larvae are whitish grubs with light tan heads; their urogomphi (spines on the last segment) are not recurved but are relatively straight.

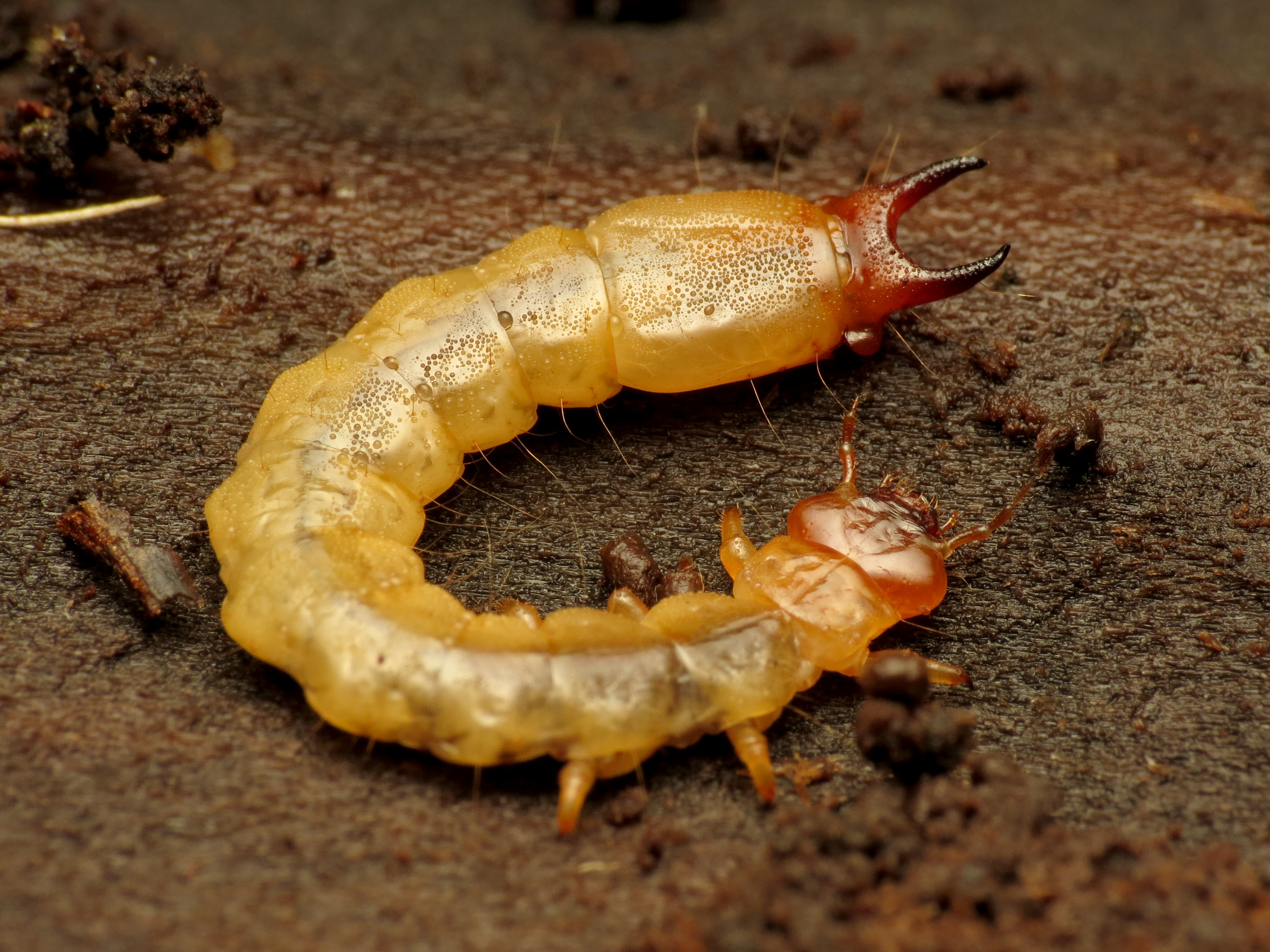
Larva

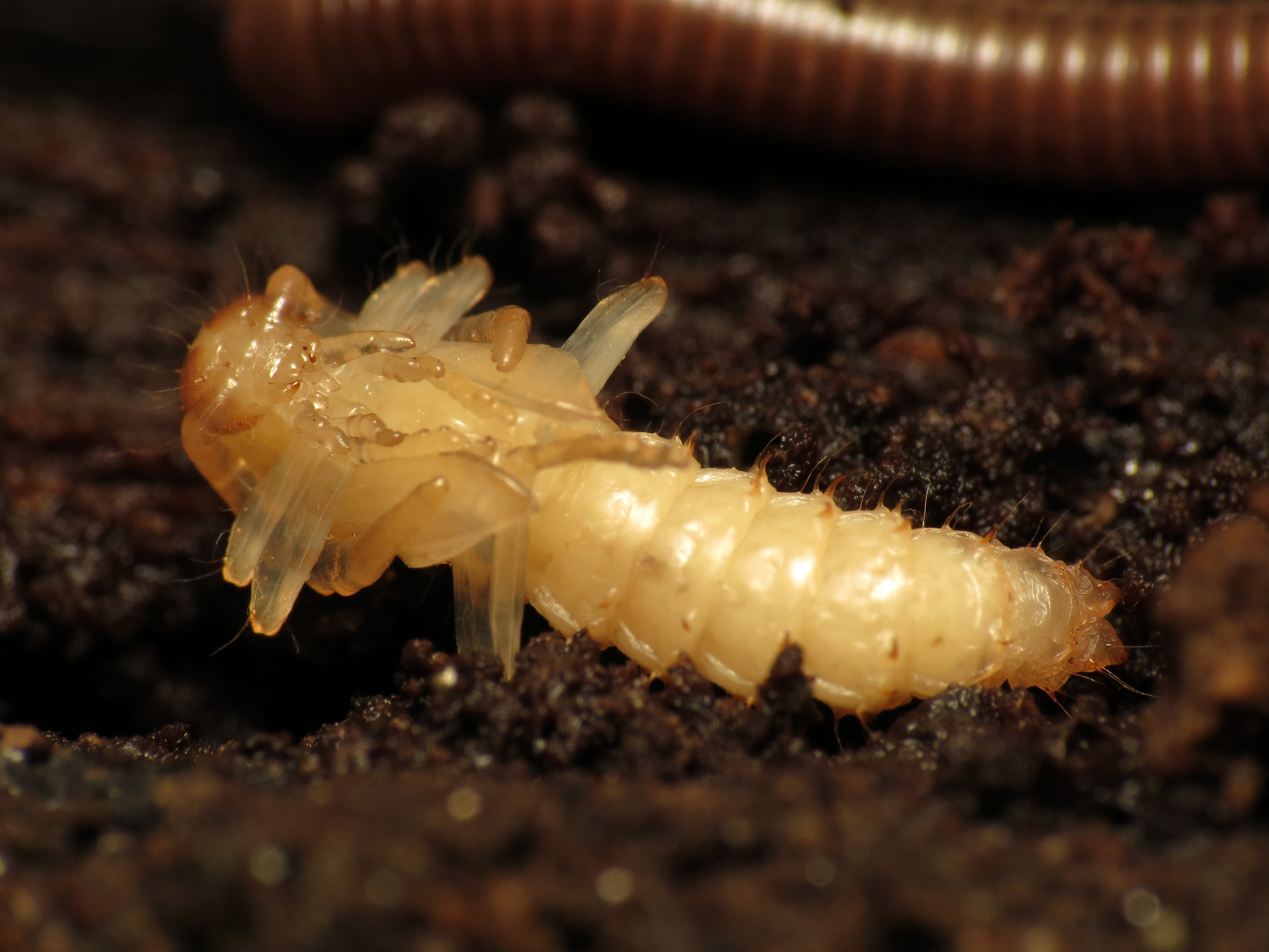
Pupa

== Distribution and habitat ==
Dendroides canadensis is found in eastern North America, its range extending from Manitoba and Nova Scotia in Canada to Oklahoma and Florida in the United States. The adults are active at night, are attracted to lights, and can be found among foliage. The larvae live under the bark of the upper and side surfaces of fallen trees and branches.

== Physiology ==
Native to Northern Indiana, this species has both the adaptations of freezing tolerance—that is, keeping body fluids above crystallization temperatures between −8 and −12 °C (18 and 10 °F)—and freezing susceptibility (supercooling)—that is, surviving with ice in the body up to −26 °C (−15 °F). This is the first known instance of overwintering by switching between the two mechanisms. In response to decreasing temperatures in the fall, D. canadensis larvae cease eating and drinking, and they evacuate the gut. In order to avoid mortality, other body fluids also need to remain liquid, and D. canadensis increases the antifreeze proteins in its hind-gut and primary urine at this time.

Its antifreeze molecules are similar to those used by the mealworm Tenebrio molitor, but they are quite distinct from antifreeze molecules used by any known fishes. Multiple types of antifreeze in simultaneous use complement each other and enhance the process. These have been used in studies to help raise cold resistance in plant species.
