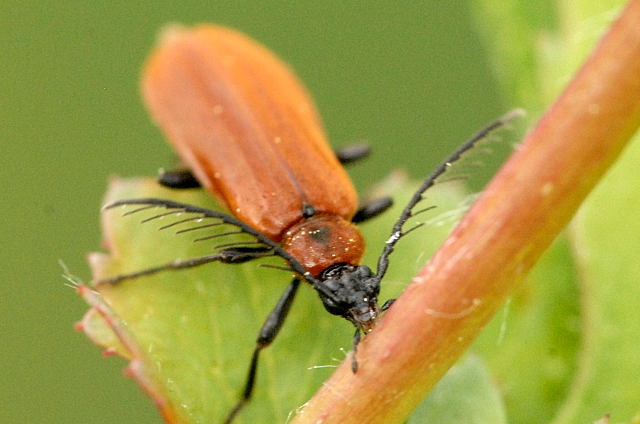

Scientific classification
- Domain: Eukaryota
- Kingdom: Animalia
- Phylum: Arthropoda
- Class: Insecta
- Order: Coleoptera
- Suborder: Polyphaga
- Infraorder: Cucujiformia
- Family: Pyrochroidae
- Subfamily: Pyrochroinae
- Genus: Schizotus; Newman, 1838

= Schizotus =

Genus of beetles

Schizotus is a genus of fire-colored beetles in the family Pyrochroidae. There are at least three described species in Schizotus.

== Species ==
These three species belong to the genus Schizotus:

- Schizotus cervicalis Newman, 1838^{g b}
- Schizotus fuscicollis (Mannerheim, 1852)^{g b}
- Schizotus pectinicornis (Linnaeus, 1758)^{g}

Data sources: i = ITIS, c = Catalogue of Life, g = GBIF, b = Bugguide.net
