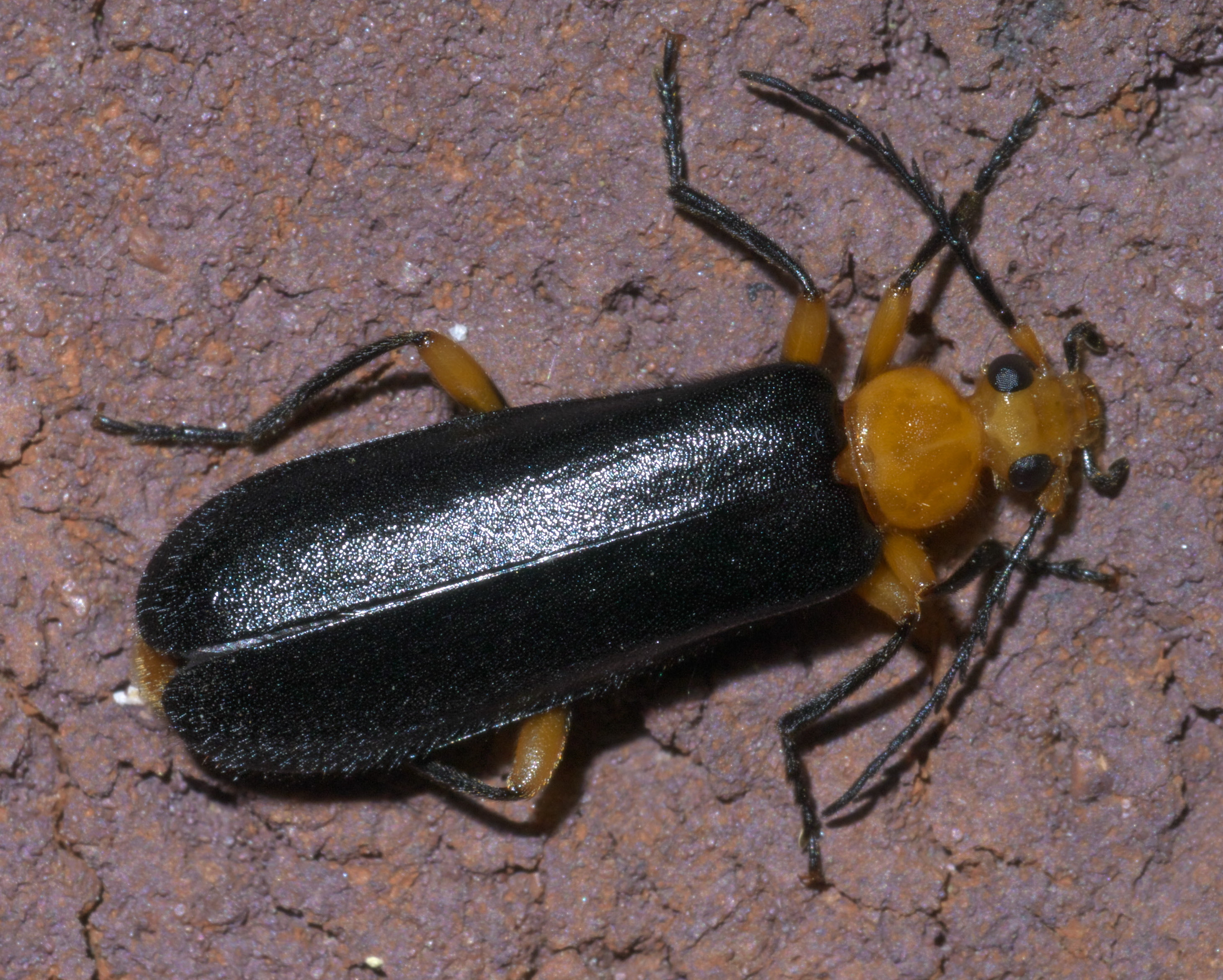
- Neopyrochroa femoralis

Scientific classification
- Domain: Eukaryota
- Kingdom: Animalia
- Phylum: Arthropoda
- Class: Insecta
- Order: Coleoptera
- Suborder: Polyphaga
- Infraorder: Cucujiformia
- Family: Pyrochroidae
- Subfamily: Pyrochroinae
- Genus: Neopyrochroa; Blair, 1914

= Neopyrochroa =

Genus of beetles

Neopyrochroa is a genus of fire-colored beetles in the family Pyrochroidae. There are at least three described species in Neopyrochroa.

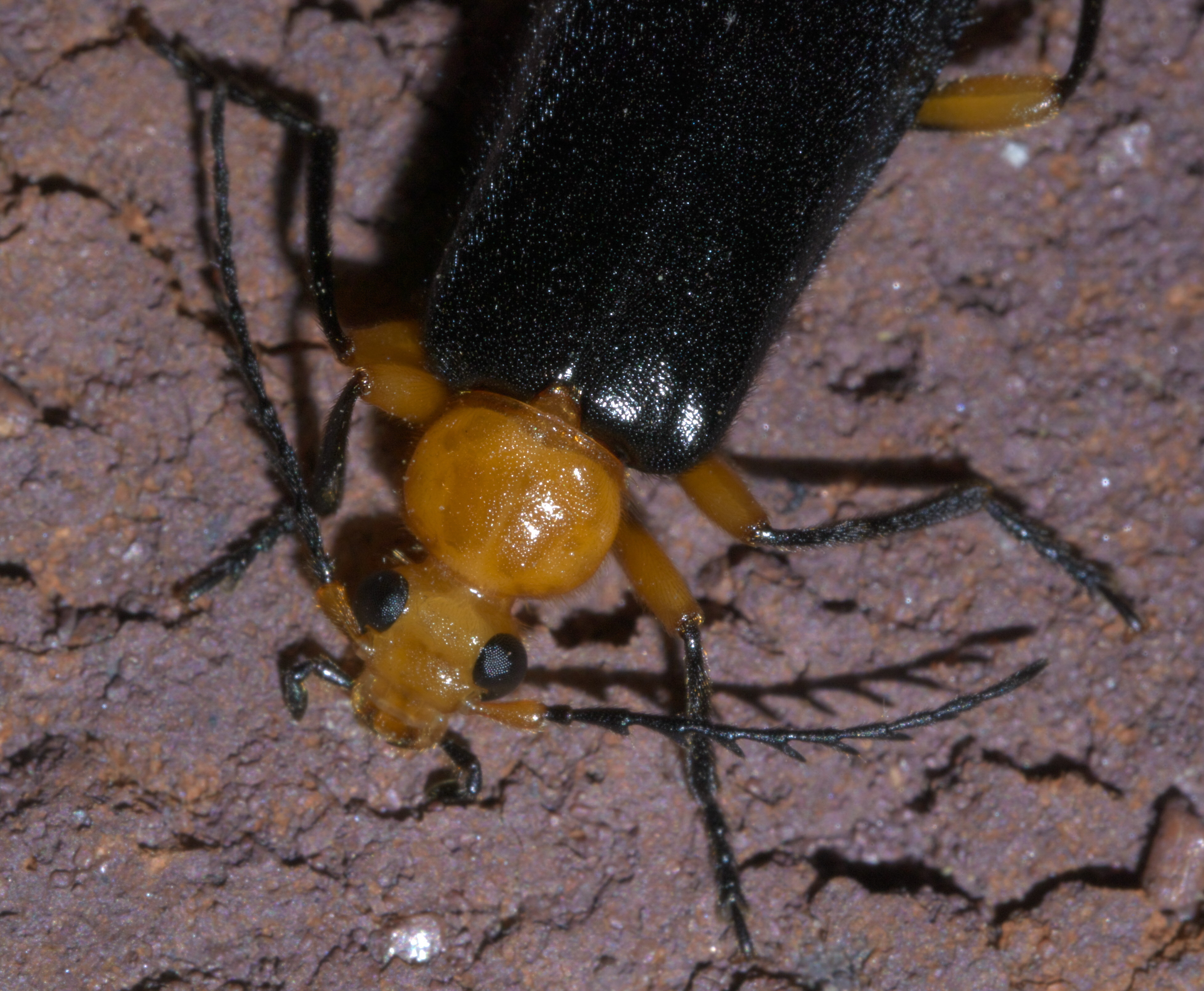
Neopyrochroa femoralis

== Species ==
These three species belong to the genus Neopyrochroa:

- Neopyrochroa californica (Horn, 1891)^{b}
- Neopyrochroa femoralis (LeConte, 1855)^{g b}
- Neopyrochroa flabellata (Fabricius, 1787)^{g b}

Data sources: g = GBIF, b = Bugguide.net
