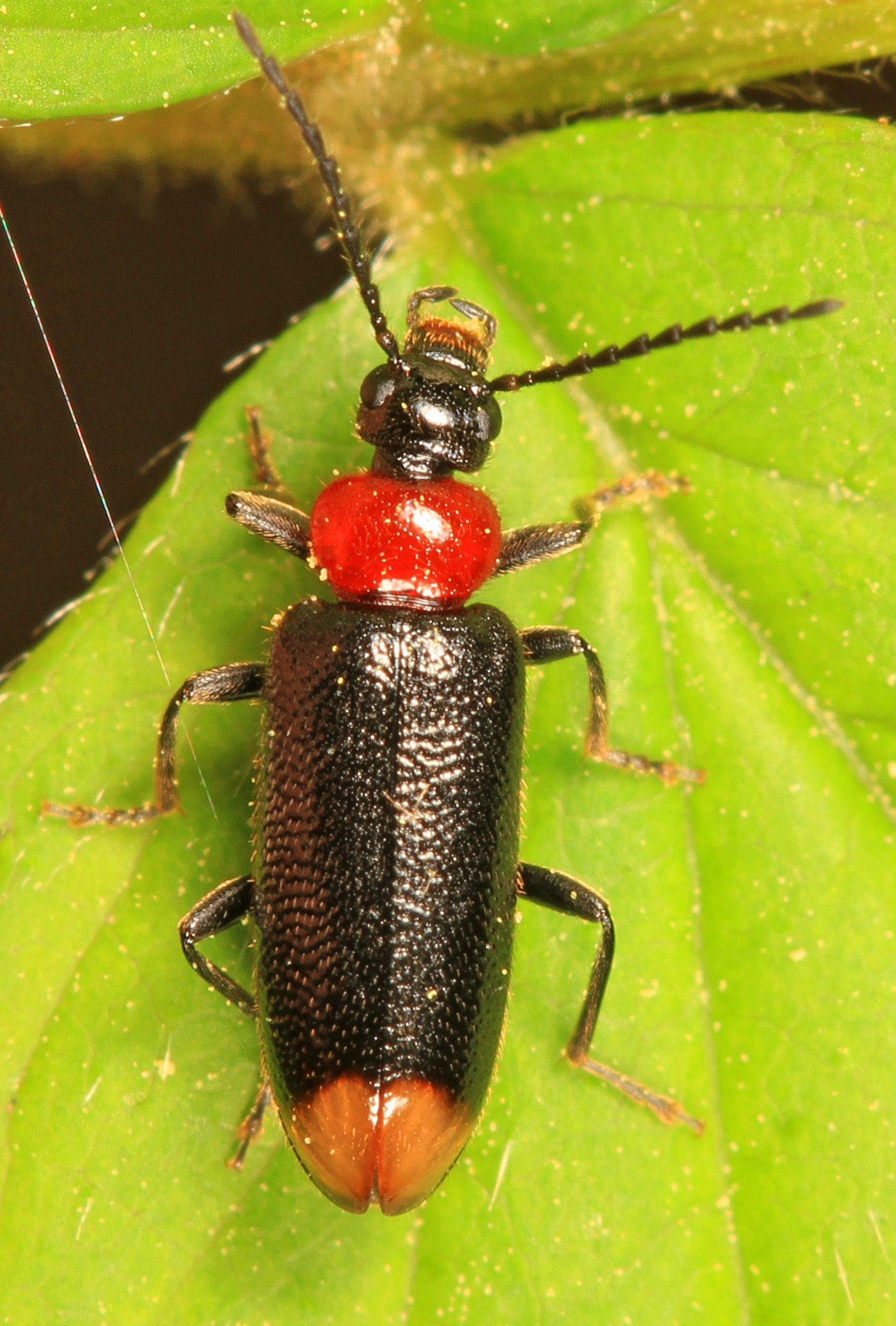

Scientific classification
- Domain: Eukaryota
- Kingdom: Animalia
- Phylum: Arthropoda
- Class: Insecta
- Order: Coleoptera
- Suborder: Polyphaga
- Infraorder: Cucujiformia
- Family: Pyrochroidae
- Genus: Pedilus
- Species: P. terminalis

Binomial name
- Pedilus terminalis (Say, 1827)

= Pedilus terminalis =

Species of beetle

Pedilus terminalis is a species of fire-colored beetle in the family Pyrochroidae.

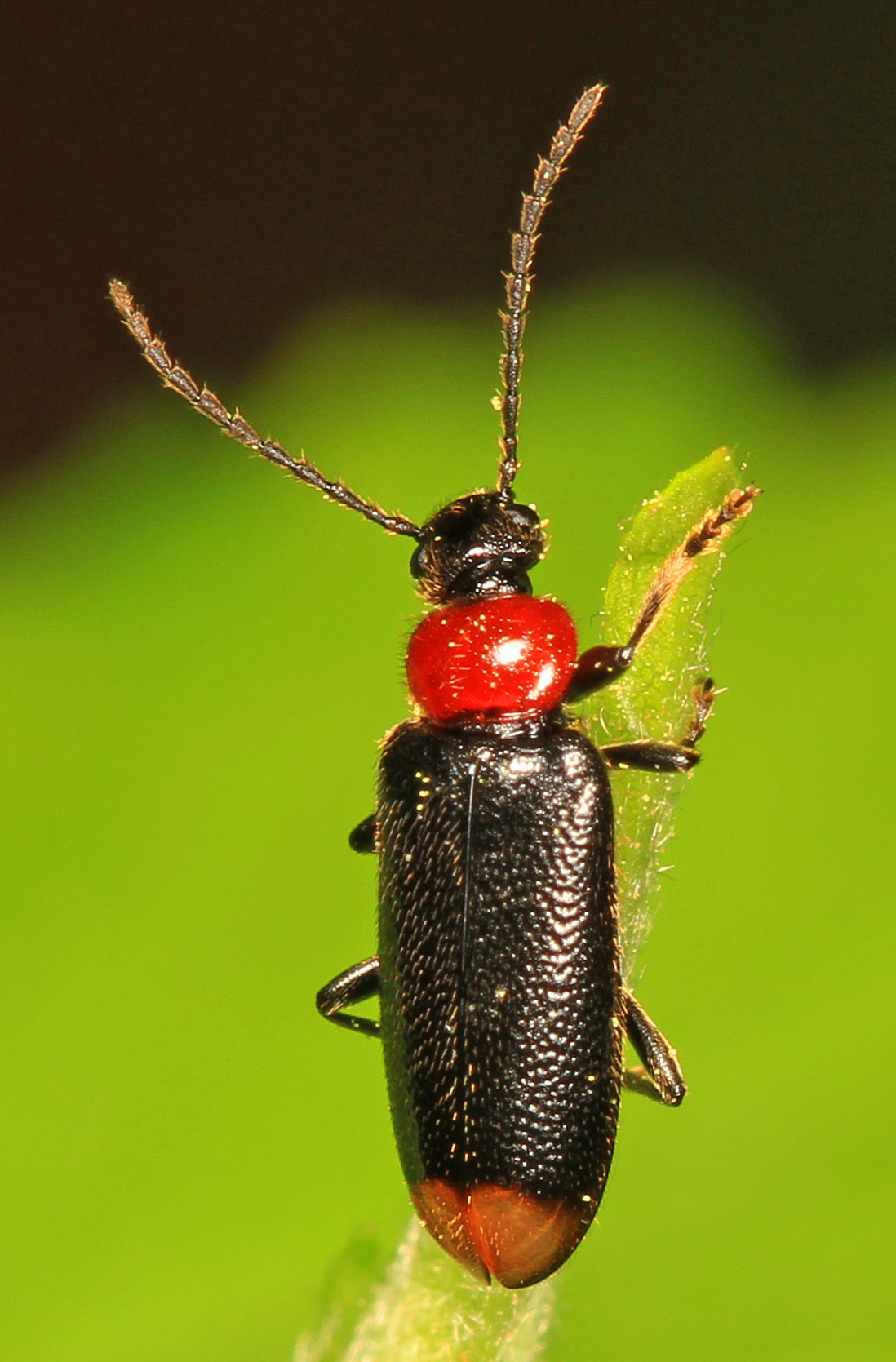
