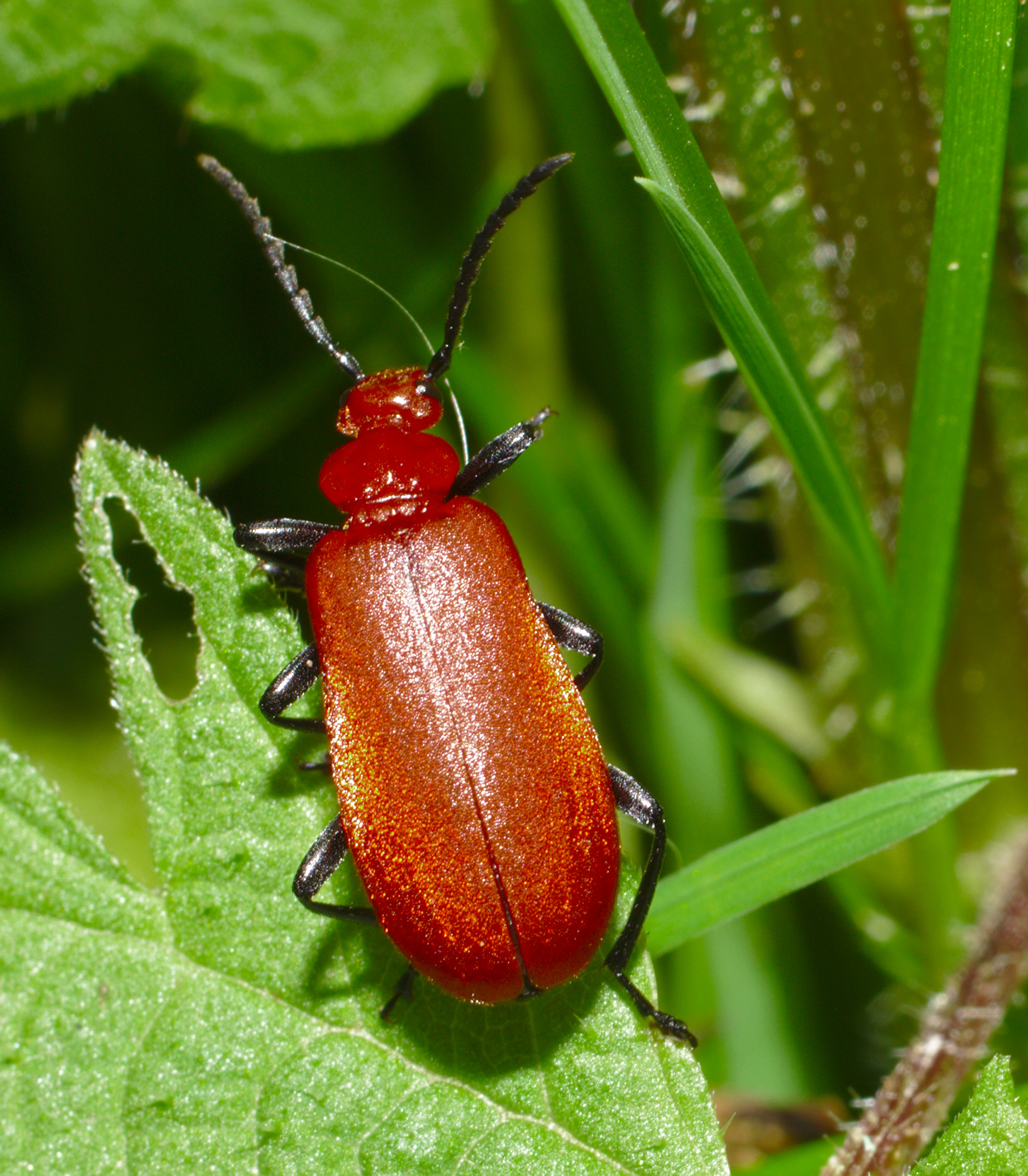
- Pyrochroa serraticornis

Scientific classification
- Kingdom: Animalia
- Phylum: Arthropoda
- Class: Insecta
- Order: Coleoptera
- Suborder: Polyphaga
- Infraorder: Cucujiformia
- Family: Pyrochroidae
- Genus: Pyrochroa; Geoffroy, 1762

= Pyrochroa =

Genus of beetles

Pyrochroa is a genus of cardinal beetle in the family Pyrochroidae. There are at least two described species in Pyrochroa.

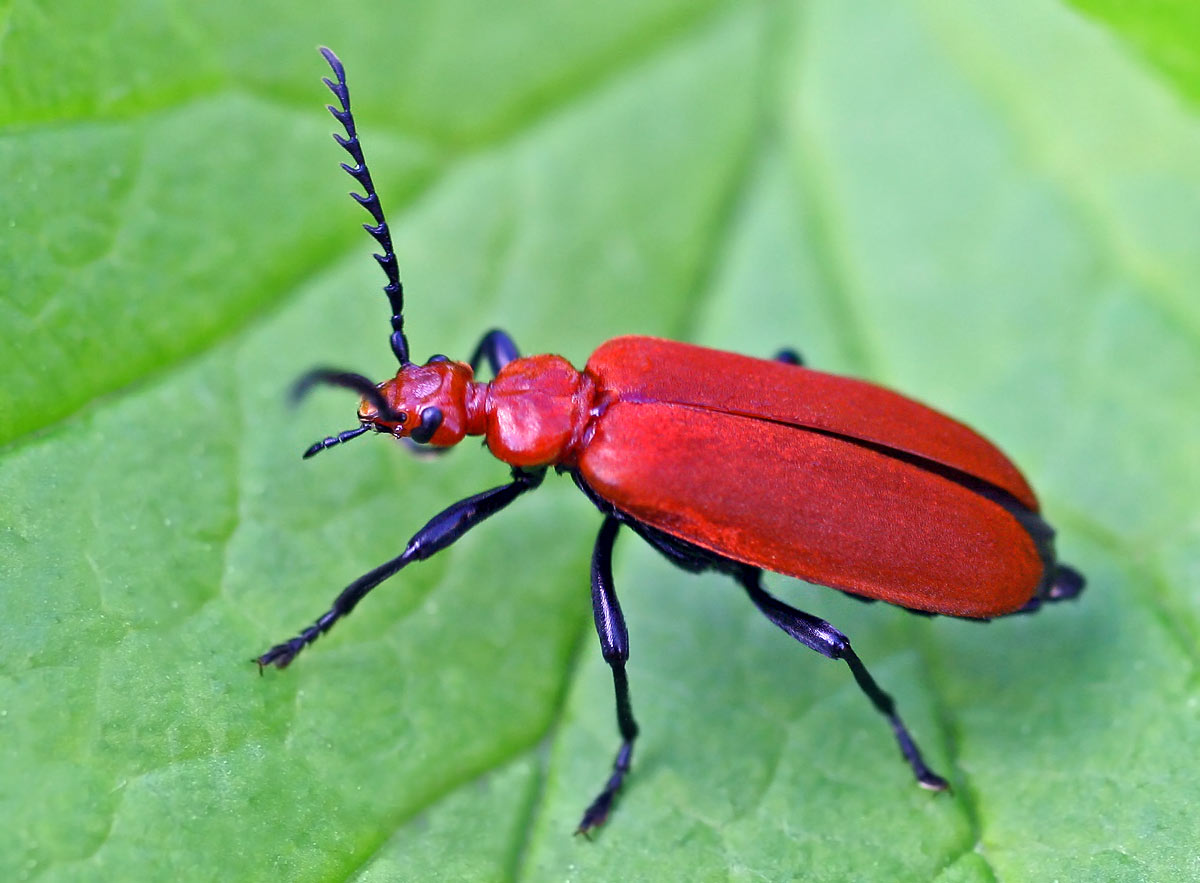
Pyrochroa serraticornis

== Species ==
These two species belong to the genus Pyrochroa:

- Pyrochroa grandis
- Pyrochroa serraticornis (Scopoli, 1763)
