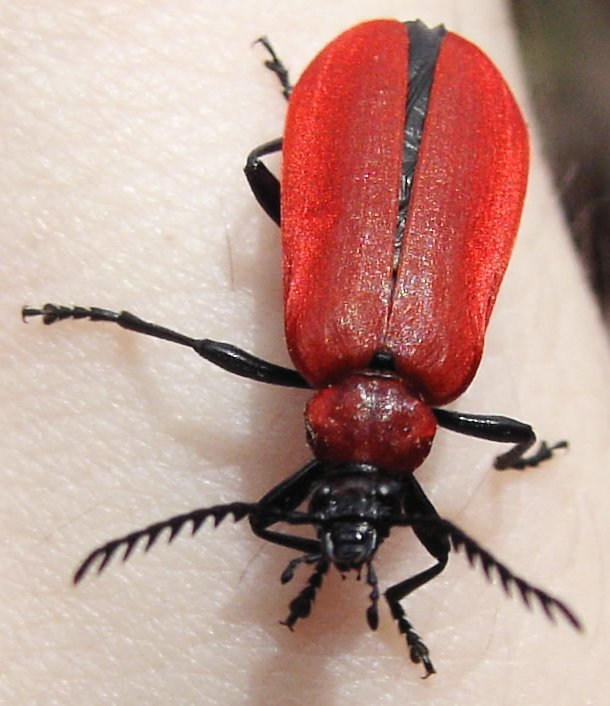
- Pyrochroa coccinea female

Scientific classification
- Kingdom: Animalia
- Phylum: Arthropoda
- Class: Insecta
- Order: Coleoptera
- Suborder: Polyphaga
- Infraorder: Cucujiformia
- Superfamily: Tenebrionoidea
- Family: Pyrochroidae; Latreille, 1807

Subfamilies
- Agnathinae; Pedilinae; Pilipalpinae; Pyrochroinae; Tydessinae

= Fire-coloured beetle =

Fire-coloured beetles

Family of beetles

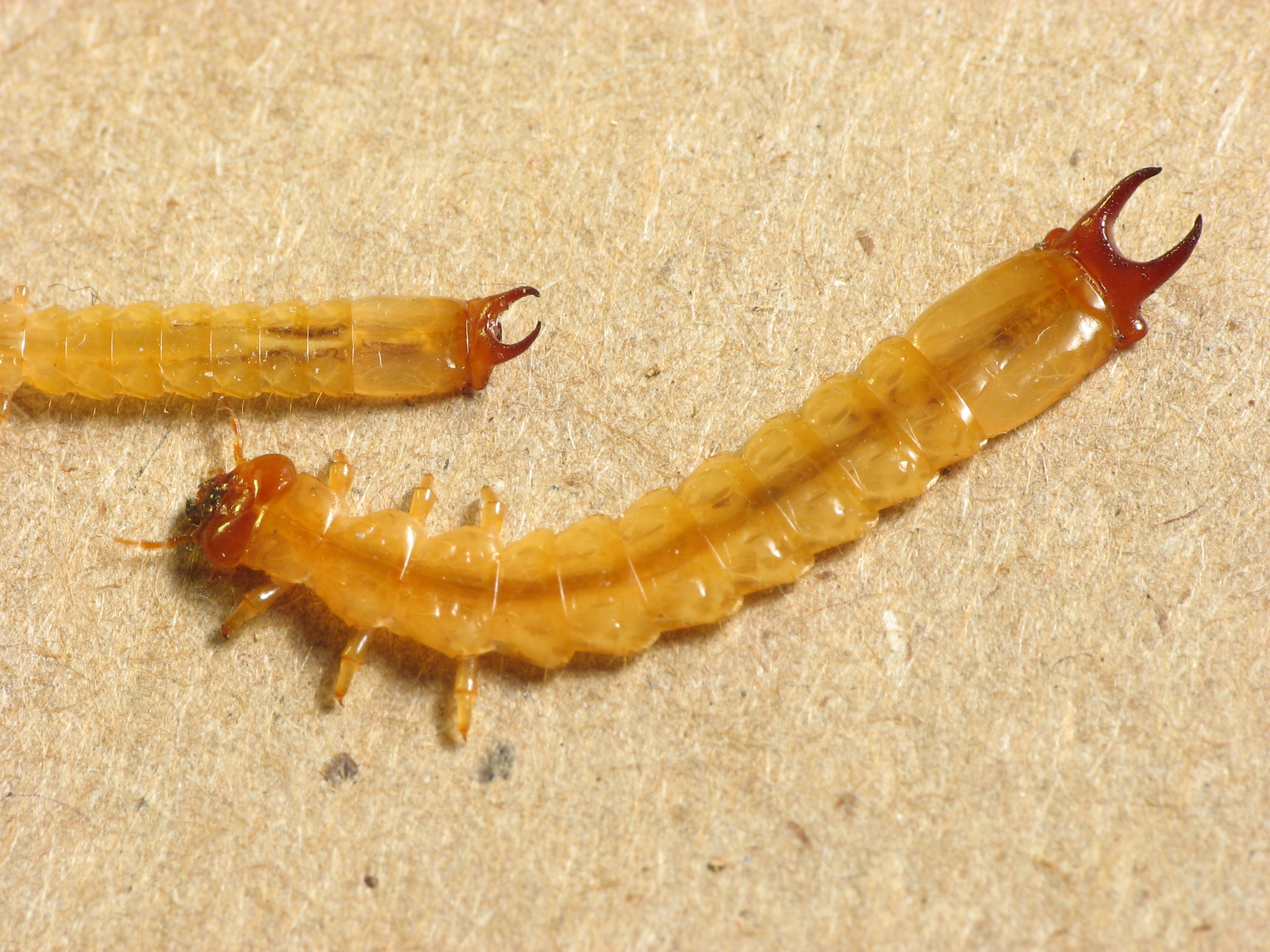
Dendroides canadensis, larvae

Fire-coloured beetles is the common name for members of the tenebrionoid family Pyrochroidae. The family is found worldwide, and is most diverse at temperate latitudes. Adults measure 2–20 millimetres (0.079–0.787 in); larvae reach 35 millimetres (1.4 in). Larvae of Pyrochroinae are found associated with the bark of dead trees. They are probably mostly fungivorous, although they may become cannibalistic if too crowded.

This family contains some 150 species in 30 genera. The males of many species in the subfamily Pyrochroinae have comb- or antler-like antennae. This family also now includes most former members of the defunct family Pedilidae.

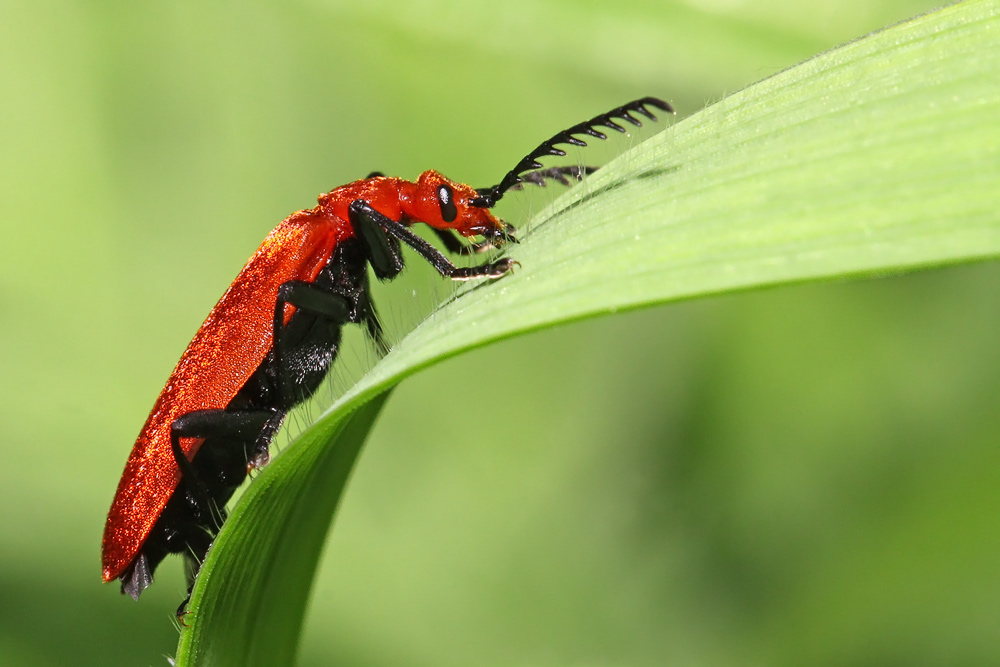
Pyrochroa serraticornis

== Genera ==
These 21 genera belong to the family Pyrochroidae:

- Agnathus Germar, 1818^{g}
- Anisotria Young, 1984^{b}
- Cononotus Leconte, 1851^{b}
- Dendroides Latreille, 1810^{i c g b}
- Exocalopus Broun, 1893^{g}
- Frontodendroidopsis Young, 2004^{g}
- Hemidendroides Ferrari, 1869^{g}
- Lithomacratria Wickham, 1914^{g}
- Malagaethes Pollock, 1995^{g}
- Neopyrochroa Blair, 1914^{g b}
- Palaeopyrochroa Abdullah, 1965^{g}
- Pedilus Fischer von Waldheim, 1820^{i c g b}
- Pogonoceromorphus Pic, 1921^{g}
- Pseudodendroides Blair, 1914^{g}
- Pseudopyrochroa Pic, 1906^{g}
- Pyrochroa Müller, 1764^{g}
- Ranomafana Pollock, 1995^{g}
- Schizotus Newman, 1838^{g b}
- Techmessodes Broun, 1893^{g}
- Tydessa Peacock, 1982^{g}

Data sources: i = ITIS, c = Catalogue of Life, g = GBIF, b = Bugguide.net

== Behaviour ==
Fire-coloured beetles are not considered harmful to humans, as they do not bite, sting, or secrete toxic chemicals. However, more research on these insects is needed to fully understand their behaviour and qualities.
