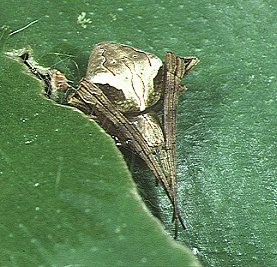
- Acacesia tenella
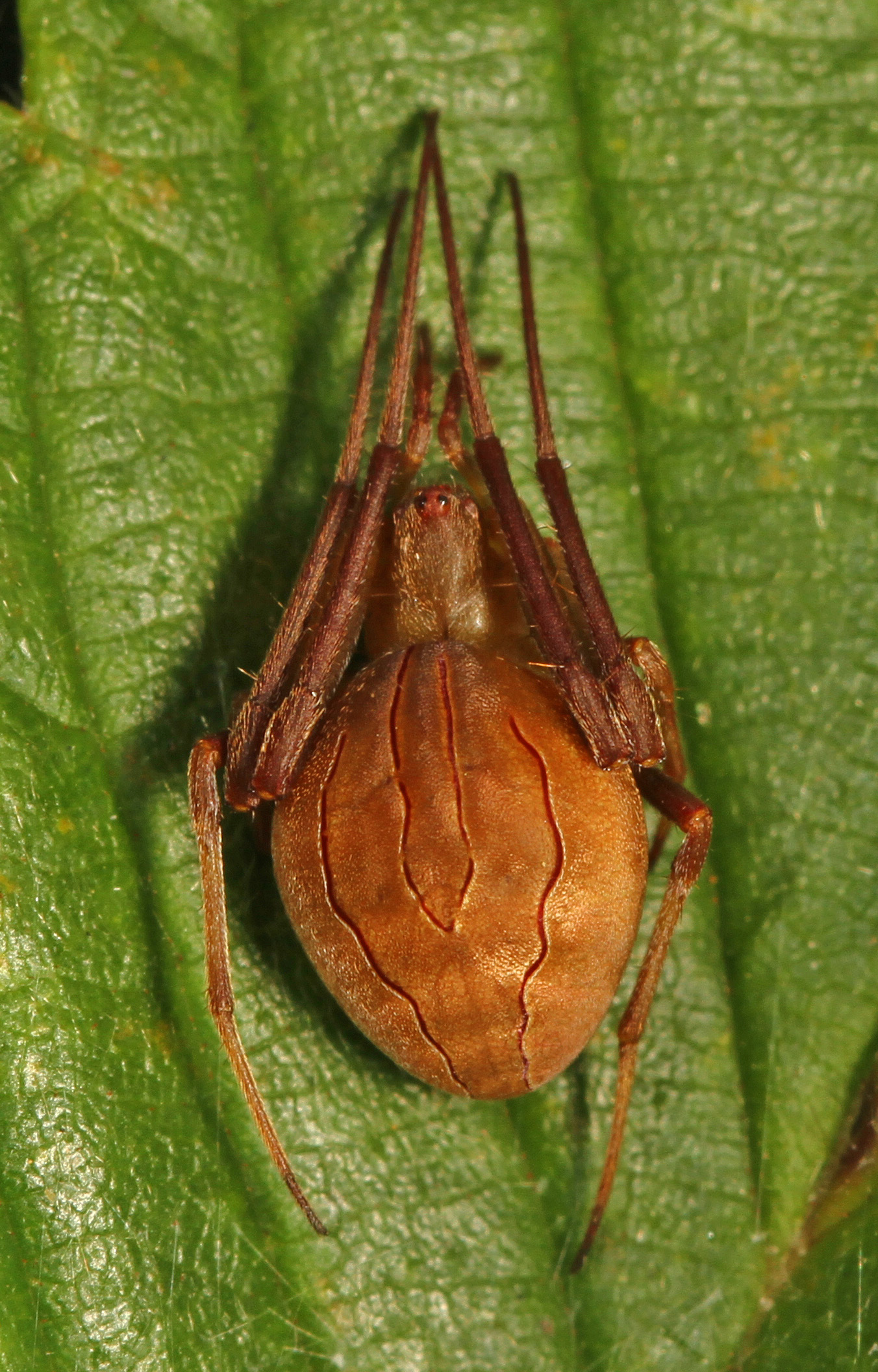
- Acacesia hamata

Scientific classification
- Kingdom: Animalia
- Phylum: Arthropoda
- Subphylum: Chelicerata
- Class: Arachnida
- Order: Araneae
- Infraorder: Araneomorphae
- Family: Araneidae
- Genus: Acacesia; Simon, 1895

Type species
- Epeira hamata (Hentz, 1847)

Species
- 6, see text

= Acacesia =

Genus of spiders

Acacesia is a genus of orb-weaver spiders first described by Eugène Simon in 1895. It contains six species with a mostly neotropical distribution, ranging from South America to Mexico. One species, A. hamata, is found in the US as well.

== Description ==
The backs of spiders in this genus are marked with a dagger shape, outlined in black and surrounded by a triangular folium. On each side of the dagger there are parallel rows of orange-brown dots. Body length of females ranges from 4.3 to 8 millimetres (0.17 to 0.31 in), of males from 3.6 to 6.5 millimetres (0.14 to 0.26 in)

== Behavior ==
As the other species are only known from museum specimens, only the natural history A. hamata is known in any detail.

== Relationships ==
Ocrepeira and Cyclosa are close relatives of this genus.

== Species ==
As of October 2026, this genus includes six species:

- Acacesia benigna Glueck, 1994 – Peru, Bolivia, Brazil
- Acacesia graciosa Lise & Braul, 1996 – Brazil
- Acacesia hamata (Hentz, 1847) – USA to Argentina
- Acacesia tenella (L. Koch, 1871) – Mexico to Brazil, French Guiana, Guyana
- Acacesia villalobosi Glueck, 1994 – Brazil
- Acacesia yacuiensis Glueck, 1994 – Brazil, Argentina
