= Ocrepeira klamt =

Scientific classification
- Kingdom: Animalia
- Phylum: Arthropoda
- Subphylum: Chelicerata
- Class: Arachnida
- Order: Araneae
- Infraorder: Araneomorphae
- Family: Araneidae
- Genus: Ocrepeira
- Species: O. klamt

Binomial name
- Ocrepeira klamt Hopfe, Ospina-Jara, Scheibel & Cabra-García, 2020

Species of spider

Ocrepeira klamt is a species of orb-weaving spider found in the Colombian paramos, named in honour of the German teacher Ulrike Klamt. Due to an armed conflict, the region in which Ocrepeira klamt can be found has been largely inaccessible until recently. Both phenotypic and genotypic studies were used to substantiate the finding that Ocrepeira klamt is a new species of the neotropical orb-weaving spiders. In addition to Ocrepeira klamt, various other neotropical orb-weaving in the genera Ocrepeira spiders have been found in the paramos region. Ocrepeira Marx, Ocrepeira globoas, and Ocrepeira subrufa are various examples of orb-weaving spiders found along with Ocrepeira klamt. Ocrepeira klamt and other orb-weaving spiders can be easily differentiated from the other genera from the shape of the carapace and the anterior humps on the abdomen. In addition, notable morphological characteristics of Ocrepeira include a patterned abdomen, a black abdomen with white spots. Presence of the carapace wide in the eye region, structure of the posterior median eyes, and abdomen physiology, including two anterior humps, confirmed the placement of Ocrepeira klamt into the Ocrepeira genus. Furthermore, unique genitalia structure and the altitude it lives separates it from other species in the genus. As compared to other species in the genus, Ocrepeira klamt was found at the highest elevation of all the Ocrepeira species in the region at 3,650 metres (11,980 ft).

== Distribution ==
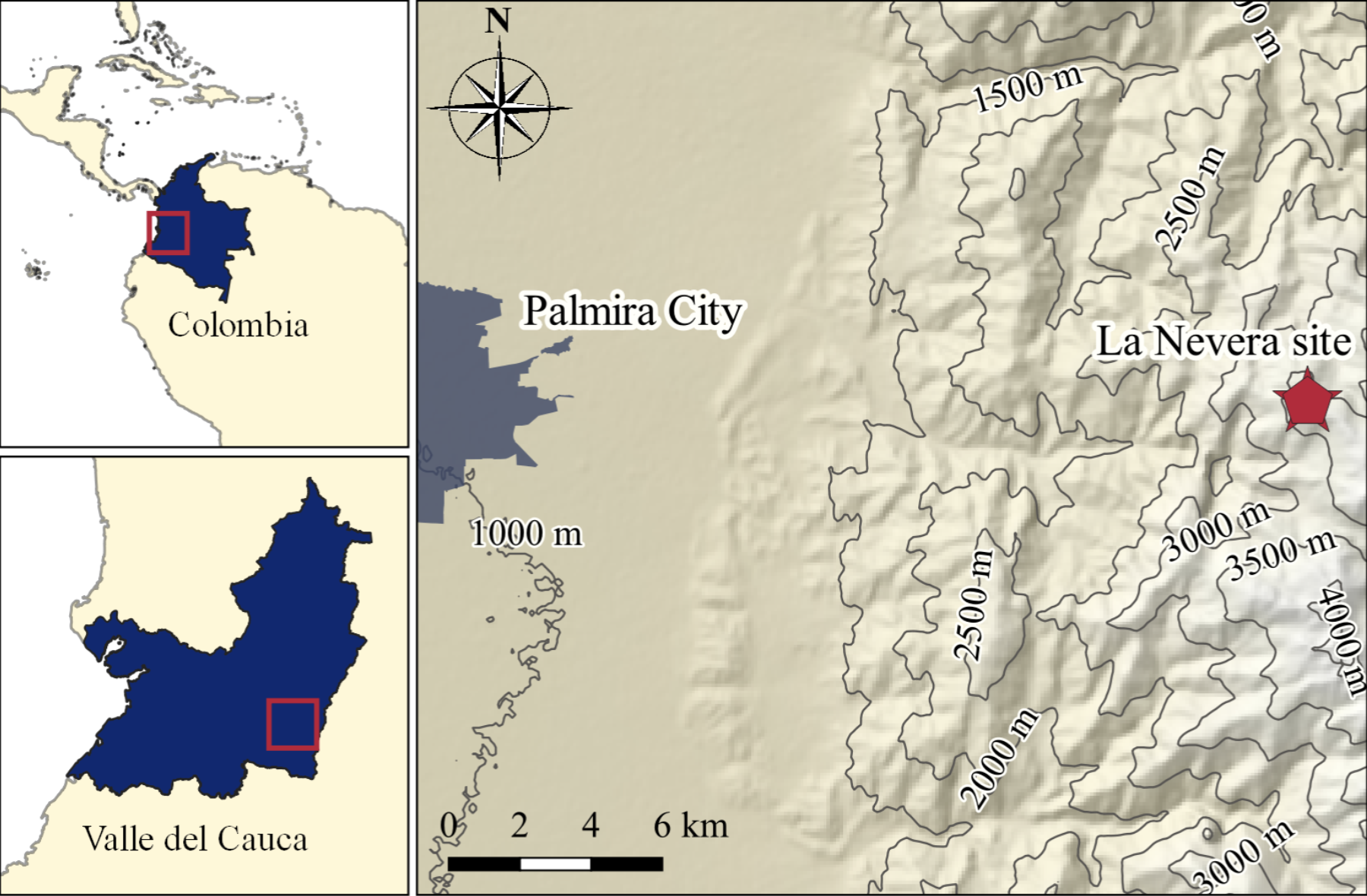

Ocrepeira klamt are located in the Colombian páramos in the Tropical Andes. The Colombian páramos faces a neotropical grassland ecosystem between the timberline and snow fields. This area is located in Valle del Cauca Colombia, the Paramo Las Hermosas, La Nevera locality (03°31'54.8"N, 76°04'40.1"W) at an elevation of roughly 3650 meters above sea level.

== Habitat and ecology ==
The paramos, which is in a montane, per-humid Holdridge life zone, has a mean temperature of 7.4 °C year round and 2400 mm of total precipitation yearly. The neotropical grassland ecosystem is characterized by swamps and wet grasslands with patches of shrubs and forests. Although this ecosystem is highly diverse, it is dominated by tussock grasses, dwarf shrubs, and Espeletia. These areas are often referred to as 'grassland isles'.

The paramos' play a key role in Colombia's hydrological system while also providing natural isolation and high biodiversity. There are a growing number of anthropogenic effects on these ecosystems and new conservation efforts should be considered. In addition, spider communities are known indicators of anthropogenic disturbance. The orb-weaving spiders Ocrepeira in the neotropical parámos are highly diverse and require protection. Paramo ecosystems are 'island-like' as they are typically isolated, which suggests that species living in these ecosystems have a generally small distribution range, which is similar to other Ocrepeira species.

Aranae are typically predators, and we can assume O. klamt holds that same role however, future studies should be conducted to analyze O. klamt's trophic role. Aranae are good indicators for analyzing the health and efficiency of an ecosystem because they can monitor functional changes in an ecosystem by easily adapting to biotic and abiotic factors in the environment.

== Morphology ==
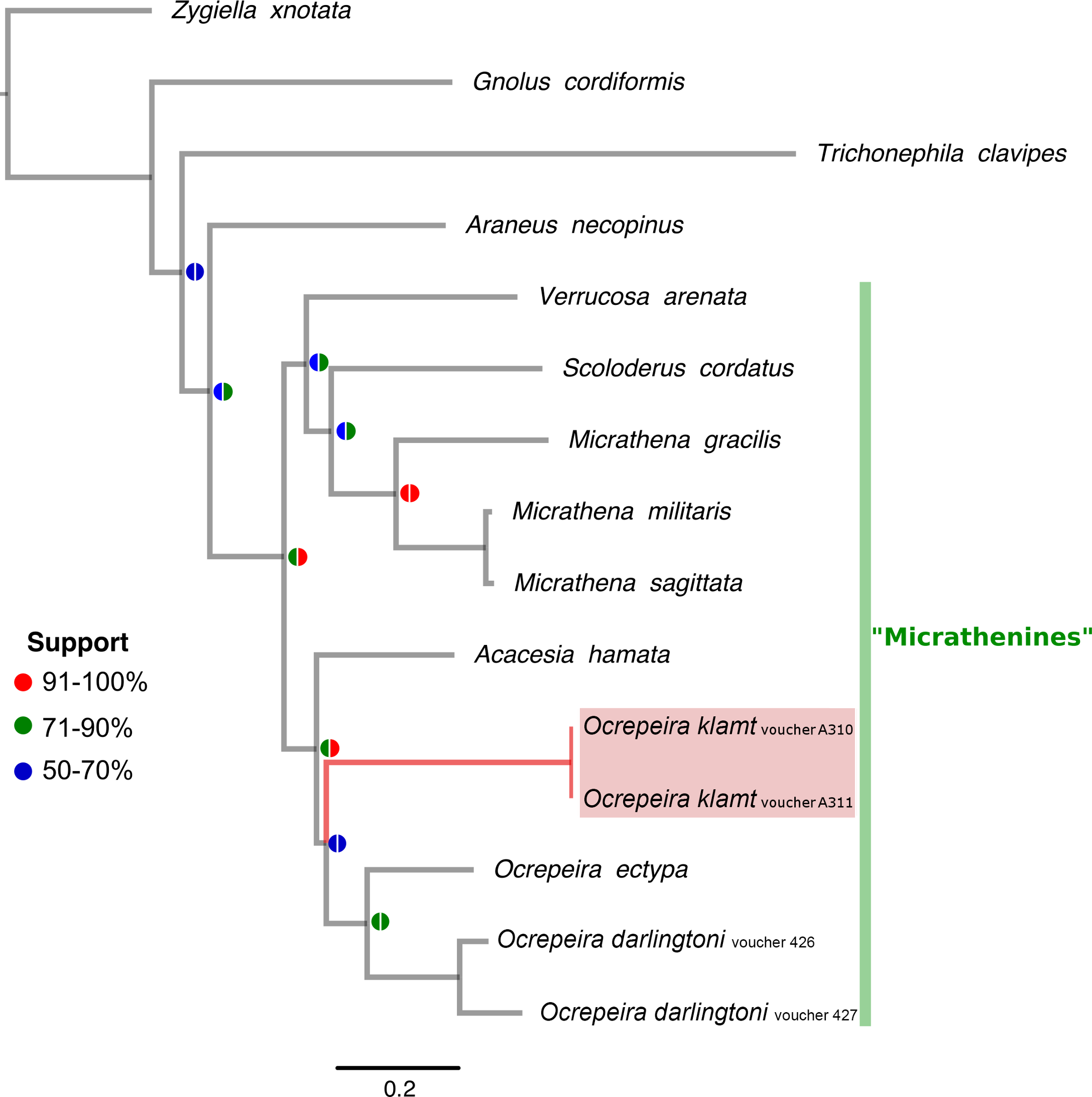
IQ-TREE optimal tree (log likelihood = −9629.087).

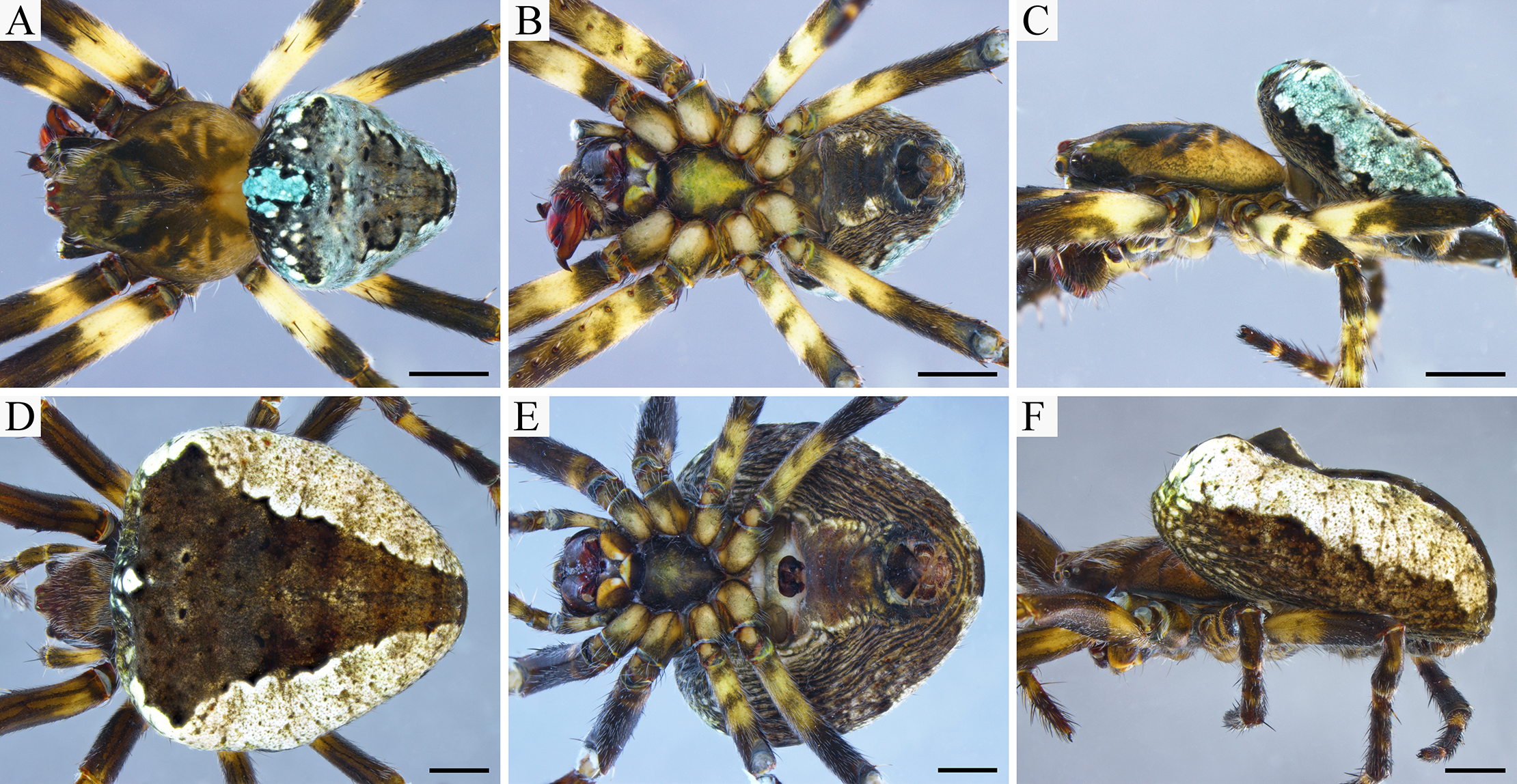
Ocrepeira klamt sp. n. habitus.

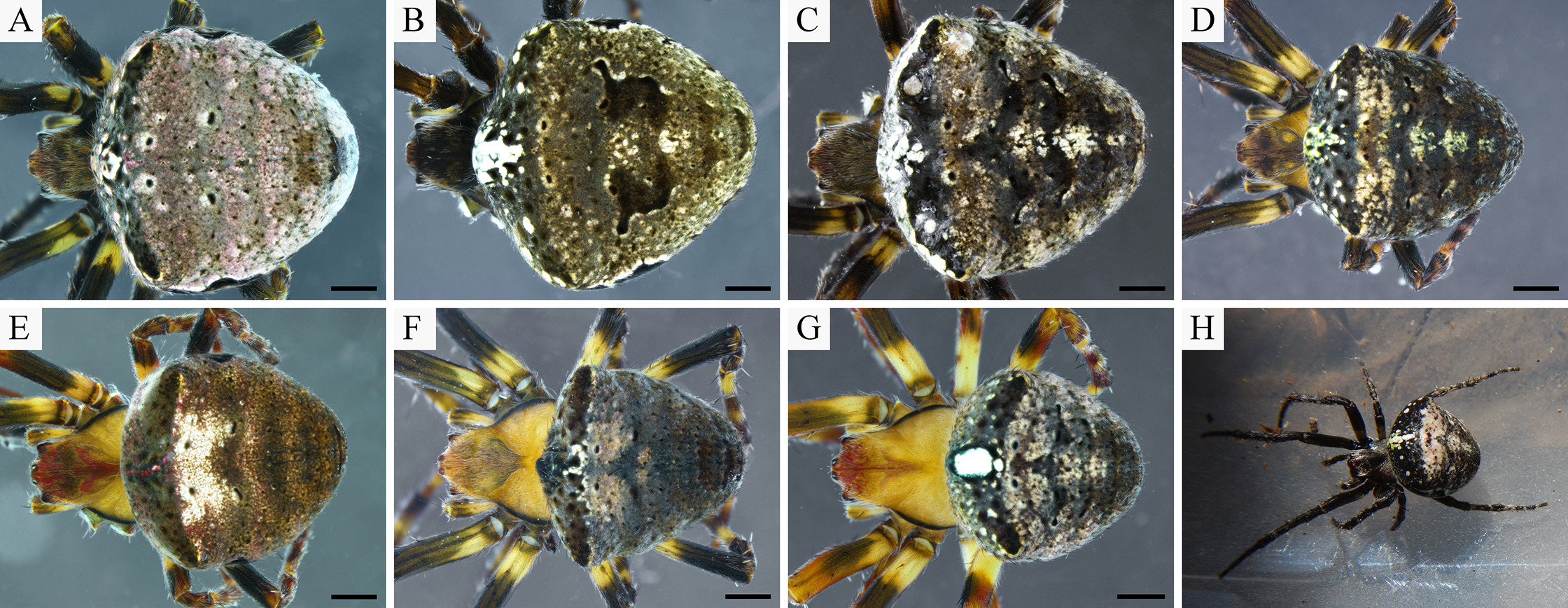
Color variation of Ocrepeira klamt sp. n. females

Ocrepeira klamt was delimited from other species of Ocrepeira through comparisons of genitalia morphological characteristics. Male (holotype). Approximately 5mm in length, the torso-exterior of the male (dorsal side) is khaki colored, with a taupe-colored head and a pattern that almost resembles the spider itself on the thoracic region. Chelicerae (appendages up near its mouth) are generally black near the body, fading to brown near their ends. Labium (mouth part) is taupe brown with a greenish rim. Turning the spider over to its ventral side, the sternum is also taupe brown fringe with a light greenish center. Its legs are patterned from darker brown through light brown with some greenish patches. The abdomen has a large hump that is patterned in grey with a robin egg-blue tint and a V-shaped brown central pattern, almost resembling that of a moth of butterfly. This orb-weaving spider has eight eyes in two transverse rows and the requisite 8 legs in a familiar 2 sets angled forward, 2 sets angled back on each side. Total length varies from 4.60 mm to 4.96 mm, carapace length from 2.75 mm to 3.18 mm (n = 3).

Female (paratype). The female is slightly larger than the male (approx. 6mm torso) and has a chocolate brown exterior. Her mouth parts including the chelicerae are similar in color to that of her male counterpart (dark brown to black with some light brown patterning. The sternum of the female is black. Legs chocolate to taupe brown, with lighter patches in the basal portion of femora, tibia, metatarsi and tarsi. The abdomen has two lateral humps which are larger than the male's and a small anterior median hump. Viewing from the dorsal side, she has a V-shaped chocolate brown pattern, the sides are mottled white with greenish-grey patterning. This white pattern covers the anterior sides of the spider's hump and similar to the male, has a pattern that resembles a moth when viewed from above. Total length from 5.47 mm to 7.11 mm, car apace 2.85 mm to 3.55 mm (n = 9). On average females are 23% larger than males.

== Species delimitation ==
Reproductive organs of Ocrepeira klamt contrast from the reproductive organs of other Ocrepeira species. Although internal genitalia of female Ocrepeira species requires further research, preliminary analysis indicates the copulatory ducts of O. klamt sp. n. differ in morphology in comparison to other Ocrepeira species.

== Medicinal ==
Future studies may demonstrate the potential for medicinal applications in silk from Ocrepeira klamt sp. n. Analysis of Ocrepeira klamt sp. n. silk proteins would be necessary to determine possible uses in biomedicine, as Charlotte Hopfe discussed.

== Orb webs ==
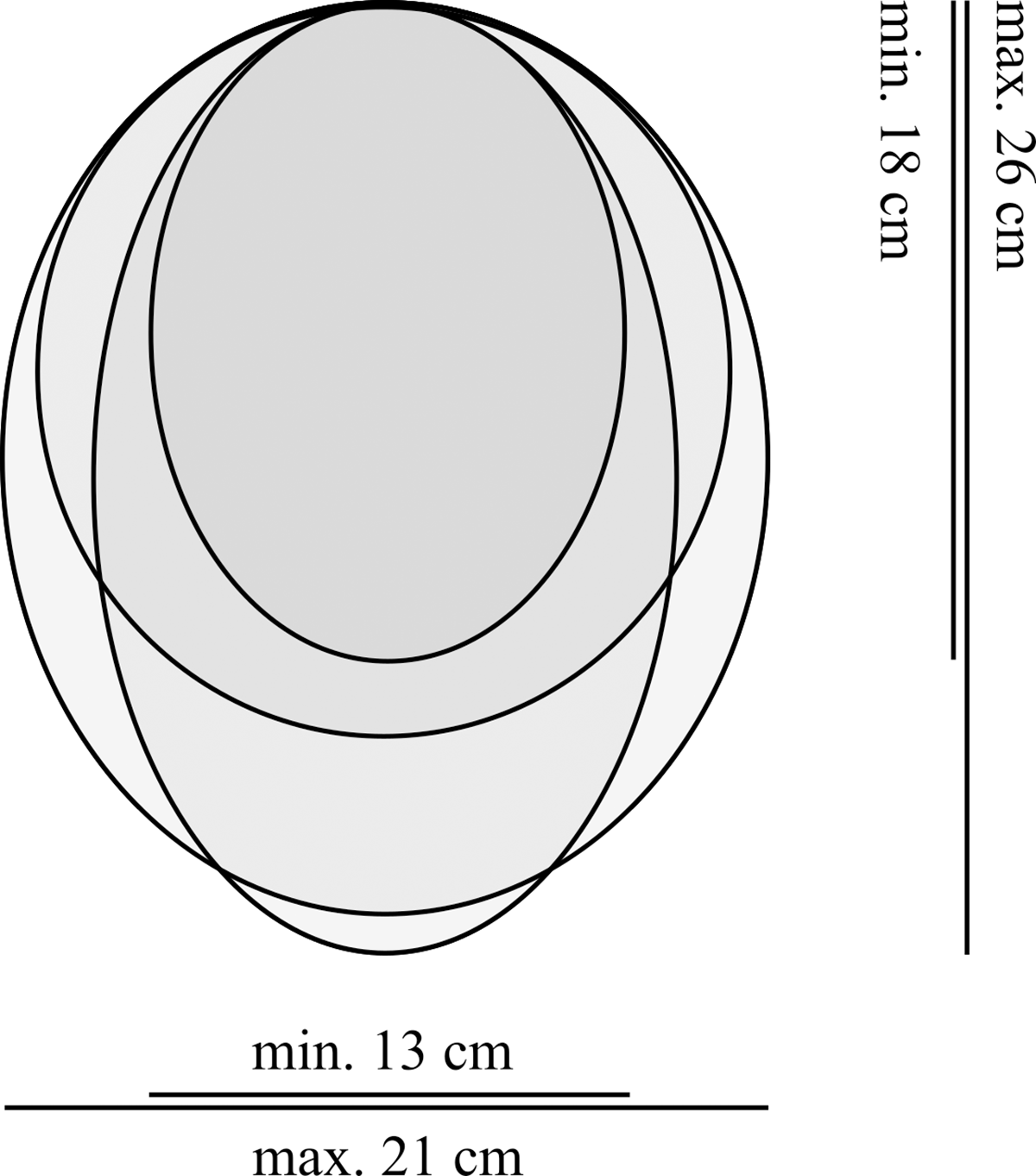
Representative web shapes of Ocrepeira klamt sp. n.

Ocrepeira klamt construct vertical orb webs, and occupy the hub, or central region of these webs throughout the night. These webs are ranging in size, dimensions, and location. Some orb webs are more round in shape, while others were found to be elliptical. In terms of height and width of the orb webs discovered, the webs were identified at a minimum of 18 cm × 13 cm and a maximum of 26 cm × 21 cm. Orb webs were located between 0.4 m and 1.6 m above the ground, and some were built within slight coverage from habitat threatening conditions, while others were found in the open.
