= Ocrepeira georgia =

Scientific classification
- Domain: Eukaryota
- Kingdom: Animalia
- Phylum: Arthropoda
- Subphylum: Chelicerata
- Class: Arachnida
- Order: Araneae
- Infraorder: Araneomorphae
- Family: Araneidae
- Genus: Ocrepeira
- Species: O. georgia

Binomial name
- Ocrepeira georgia (Levi, 1976)

Species of spider

Ocrepeira georgia is a species of orb weaver in the spider family Araneidae. It is found in the United States.
