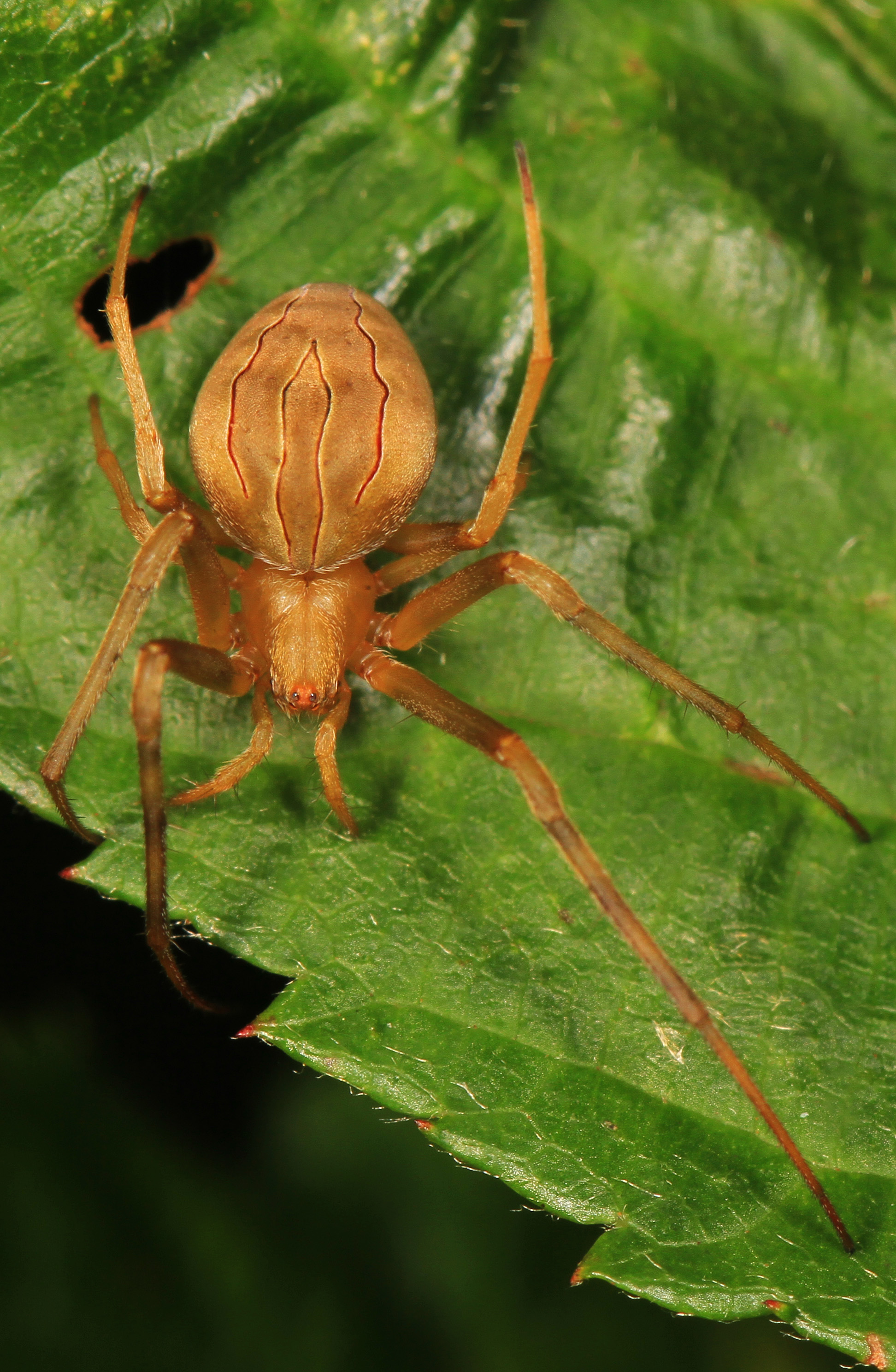
- Female

Scientific classification
- Domain: Eukaryota
- Kingdom: Animalia
- Phylum: Arthropoda
- Subphylum: Chelicerata
- Class: Arachnida
- Order: Araneae
- Infraorder: Araneomorphae
- Family: Araneidae
- Genus: Acacesia
- Species: A. hamata

Binomial name
- Acacesia hamata Hentz, 1847

= Acacesia hamata =

Species of spider

Acacesia hamata is a species of spider in the orb weaver family, Araneidae. It is typically found in summer months of the eastern half of the United States, south to Argentina. Acacesia hamata is the only species of Acacesia normally found in the United States.
