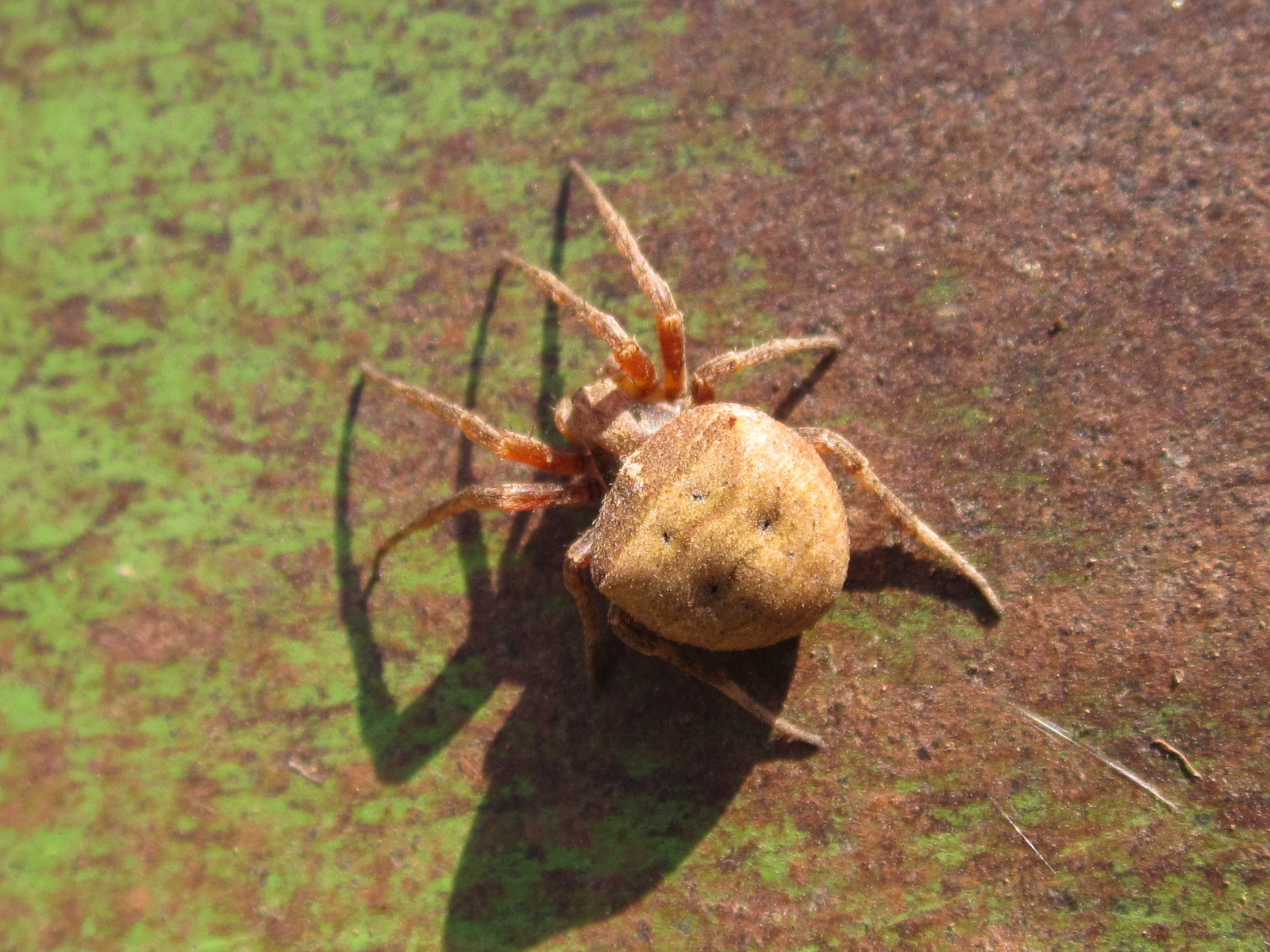
- Ocrepeira venustula

Scientific classification
- Kingdom: Animalia
- Phylum: Arthropoda
- Subphylum: Chelicerata
- Class: Arachnida
- Order: Araneae
- Infraorder: Araneomorphae
- Family: Araneidae
- Genus: Ocrepeira; Marx, 1883

Type species
- O. ectypa (Walckenaer, 1841)

Species
- 74, see text

= Ocrepeira =

Genus of spiders

Ocrepeira is a genus of orb-weaver spiders first described by George Marx in 1883.

== Species ==
As of November 2026 it contains seventy-four species:

- O. abiseo Levi, 1993 – Peru
- O. albopunctata (Taczanowski, 1879) – Peru, Brazil, Guyana, French Guiana
- O. anta Levi, 1993 – Colombia
- O. aragua Levi, 1993 – Venezuela
- O. arturi Levi, 1993 – Panama
- O. atuncela Levi, 1993 – Colombia
- O. barbara Levi, 1993 – Peru
- O. bispinosa (Mello-Leitão, 1945) – Brazil
- O. branta Levi, 1993 – Jamaica
- O. camaca Levi, 1993 – Brazil
- O. camelus (Simon, 1895)
- O. comaina Levi, 1993 – Peru
- O. covillei Levi, 1993 – Costa Rica, Trinidad to Bolivia
- O. cuy Levi, 1993 – Peru
- O. darlingtoni (Bryant, 1945) – Hispaniola
- O. duocypha (Chamberlin, 1916) – Peru
- O. ectypa (Walckenaer, 1841) – USA
- O. fiebrigi (Dahl, 1906) – Brazil, Paraguay
- O. galianoae Levi, 1993 – Brazil, Argentina
- O. georgia (Levi, 1976) – USA
- O. (O. Pickard-Cambridge, 1889)
- O. gima Levi, 1993 – Brazil
- O. globosa (F. O. Pickard-Cambridge, 1904) – USA, Mexico
- O. gnomo (Mello-Leitão, 1943) – Brazil
- O. gulielmi Levi, 1993 – Colombia, Ecuador
- O. heredia Levi, 1993 – Costa Rica
- O. herrera Levi, 1993 – Colombia, Ecuador, Peru
- O. hirsuta (Mello-Leitão, 1942) – Brazil, Paraguay, Argentina
- O. hondura Levi, 1993 – Costa Rica
- O. incerta (Bryant, 1936) – Cuba
- O. ituango Levi, 1993 – Colombia
- O. jacara Levi, 1993 – Brazil
- O. jamora Levi, 1993 – Ecuador
- O. klossi Levi, 1993 – Brazil
- O. lapeza Levi, 1993 – Colombia
- O. lisei Levi, 1993 – Brazil
- O. lurida (Mello-Leitão, 1943) – Bolivia, Argentina
- O. macaiba Levi, 1993 – Brazil
- O. macintyrei Levi, 1993 – Ecuador
- O. magdalena Levi, 1993 – Colombia
- O. malleri Levi, 1993 – Brazil
- O. maltana Levi, 1993 – Peru
- O. maraca Levi, 1993 – Colombia, Venezuela, Brazil
- O. maroni Dierkens, 2014 – French Guiana
- O. mastophoroides (Mello-Leitão, 1942) – Argentina
- O. molle Levi, 1993 – Bolivia, Argentina
- O. pedregal Levi, 1993 – Mexico, Nicaragua
- O. perpera (Petrunkevitch, 1911)
- O. pinhal Levi, 1993 – Brazil
- O. pista Levi, 1993 – Peru
- O. planada Levi, 1993 – Colombia, Ecuador
- O. potosi Levi, 1993 – Mexico
- O. quasimodo (Ferreira-Sousa & Motta, 2022)
- O. redempta (Gertsch & Mulaik, 1936) – USA to Honduras
- O. redondo Levi, 1993 – Colombia
- O. rufa (O. Pickard-Cambridge, 1889) – Mexico to Costa Rica
- O. saladito Levi, 1993 – Colombia
- O. serrallesi (Bryant, 1947) – Caribbean
- O. sorota Levi, 1993 – Bolivia
- O. steineri Levi, 1993 – Venezuela
- O. subrufa (F. O. Pickard-Cambridge, 1904) – Mexico to Panama
- O. tinajillas Levi, 1993 – Colombia, Ecuador
- O. topazio (Ferreira-Sousa & Motta, 2022)
- O. tumida (Keyserling, 1865) – Colombia, Ecuador
- O. tungurahua Levi, 1993 – Ecuador
- O. valderramai Levi, 1993 – Colombia
- O. venustula (Keyserling, 1879) – Colombia to Chile
- O. verecunda (Keyserling, 1865) – Colombia
- O. viejo Levi, 1993 – Costa Rica to Peru
- O. willisi Levi, 1993 – Panama
- O. yaelae Levi, 1993 – Ecuador
- O. yucatan Levi, 1993 – Mexico
