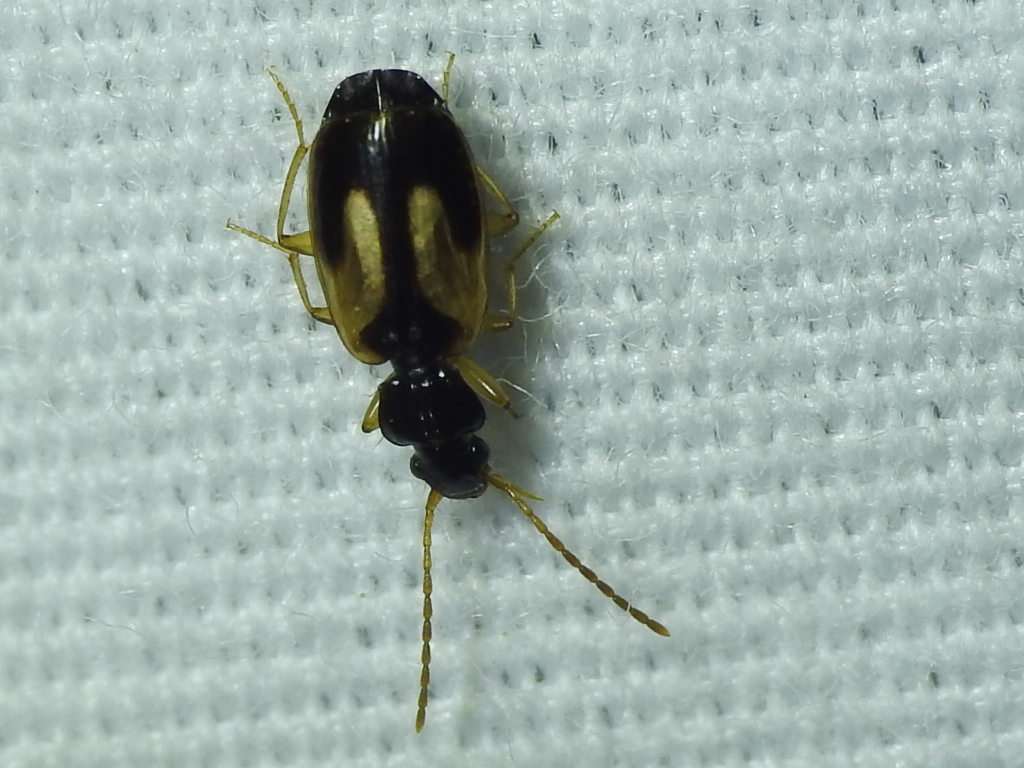
- Axinopalpus biplagiatus, Texas

Scientific classification
- Kingdom: Animalia
- Phylum: Arthropoda
- Class: Insecta
- Order: Coleoptera
- Suborder: Adephaga
- Family: Carabidae
- Subfamily: Lebiinae
- Tribe: Lebiini
- Genus: Axinopalpus; LeConte, 1846

= Axinopalpus =

Genus of beetles

Axinopalpus is a genus in the beetle family Carabidae, found in North, Central, and South America. There are about 15 described species in Axinopalpus.

== Species ==
These 15 species belong to the genus Axinopalpus:

- Axinopalpus biplagiatus (Dejean, 1825) (United States, Canada, and Mexico)
- Axinopalpus brevicollis (Germain, 1855) (Chile)
- Axinopalpus brunneus (Chaudoir, 1876) (Chile)
- Axinopalpus crusoei (Reed, 1874) (Chile)
- Axinopalpus denticulatus Hatch, 1949 (United States)
- Axinopalpus fusciceps LeConte, 1851 (United States and Mexico)
- Axinopalpus humeralis (Solier, 1849) (Chile)
- Axinopalpus illectus Casey, 1920 (United States)
- Axinopalpus jucundus Bates, 1883 (Guatemala)
- Axinopalpus mexicanus Bates, 1883 (Mexico)
- Axinopalpus ovipennis (Chaudoir, 1876) (Chile)
- Axinopalpus pratti Hatch, 1949 (United States)
- Axinopalpus pusillus (Dejean, 1831) (Chile, Colombia, and Brazil)
- Axinopalpus utahensis Tanner, 1928 (United States)
- Axinopalpus vittatus Hatch, 1949 (United States)
