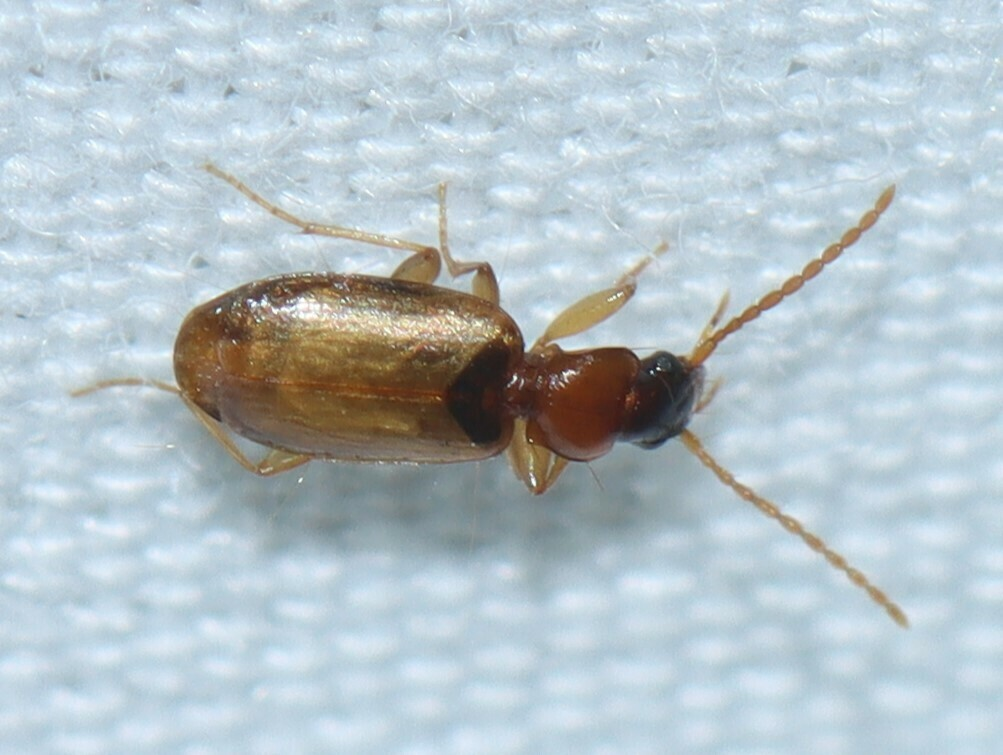

Scientific classification
- Kingdom: Animalia
- Phylum: Arthropoda
- Class: Insecta
- Order: Coleoptera
- Suborder: Adephaga
- Family: Carabidae
- Genus: Axinopalpus
- Species: A. fusciceps

Binomial name
- Axinopalpus fusciceps LeConte, 1851

Synonyms
- Axinopalpus nigriceps (LeConte, 1880)

= Axinopalpus fusciceps =

Species of beetle

Axinopalpus fusciceps, the black-headed pale carabid, is a species of ground beetle in the family Carabidae. It is found in North America.

== Range ==
Western United States (from California, Texas, Oklahoma, Colorado, and Idaho) extending southward to Guatemala, with a primary range in the southwestern United States to central Texas, as well as Mexico. A. fusciceps is seen occurring mostly in the summer and fall months, with large spikes in occurrences in June and July.
