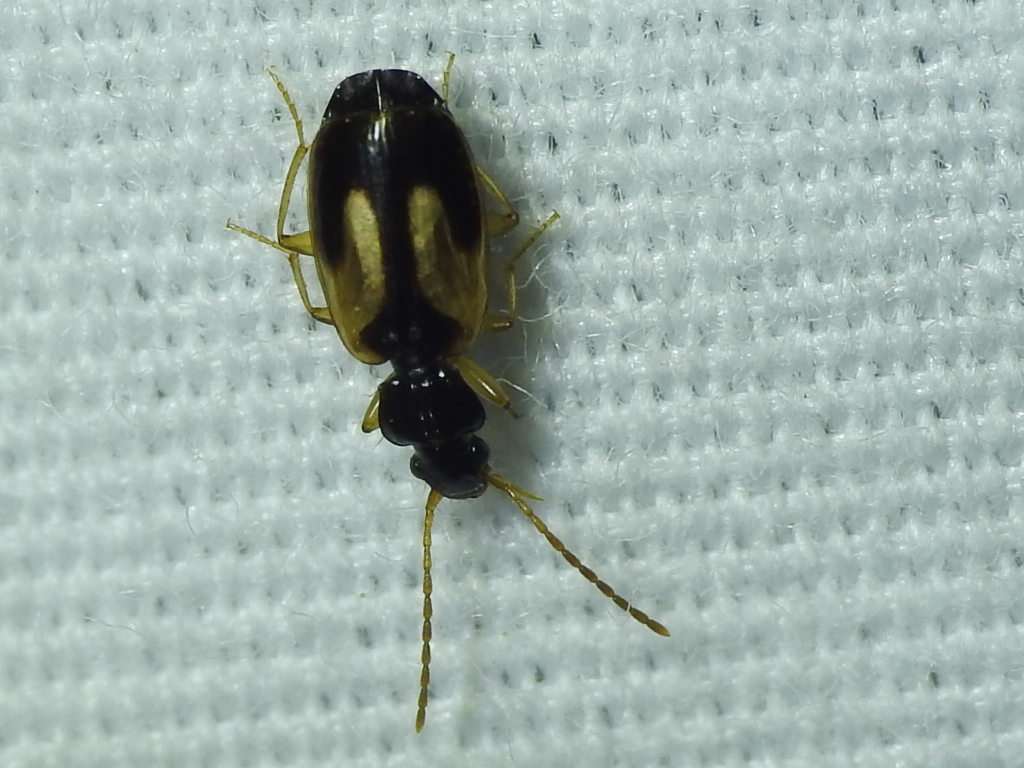
- Image of Axinopalpus biplagiatus

Scientific classification
- Kingdom: Animalia
- Phylum: Arthropoda
- Class: Insecta
- Order: Coleoptera
- Suborder: Adephaga
- Family: Carabidae
- Genus: Axinopalpus
- Species: A. biplagiatus

Binomial name
- Axinopalpus biplagiatus (Dejean, 1825)

Synonyms
- Axinopalpus coloradensis Casey, 1920; Axinopalpus demissus Casey, 1920; Axinopalpus habilis Casey, 1920

= Axinopalpus biplagiatus =

Species of beetle

Axinopalpus biplagiatus is a species of ground beetle in the family Carabidae. It is found in North America.
