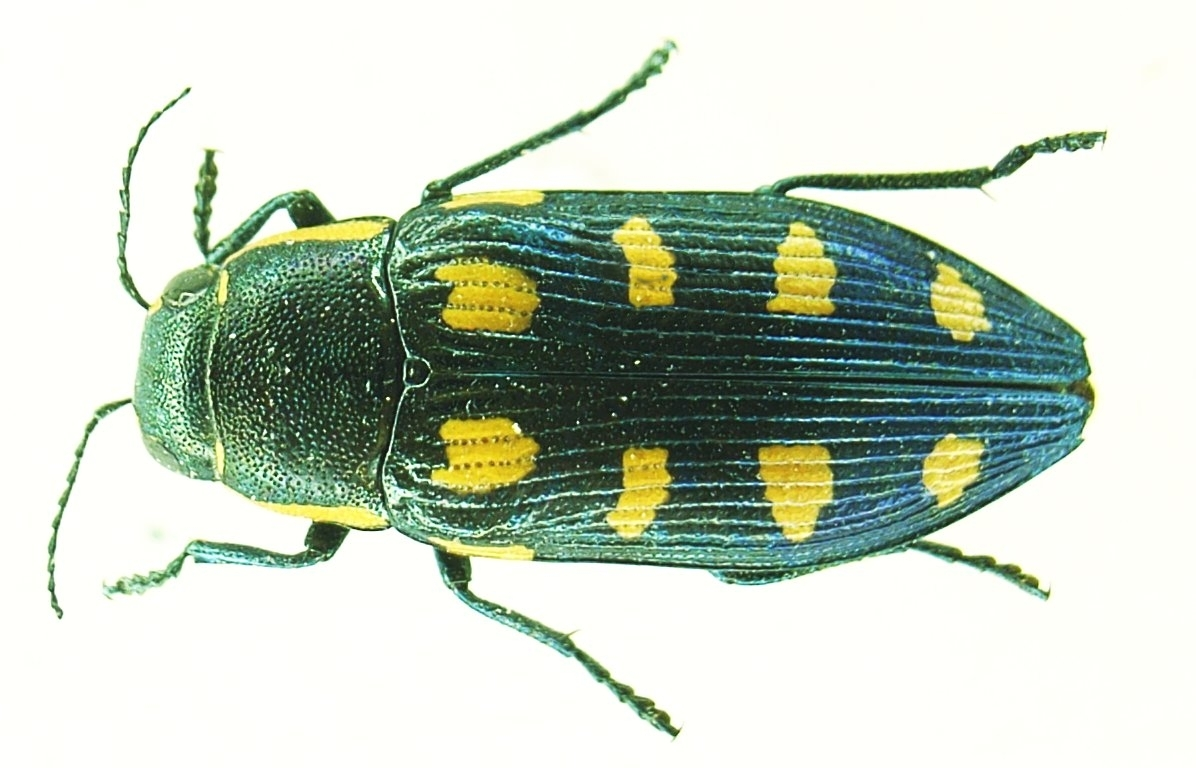
- Buprestis octoguttata (type sp.)

Scientific classification
- Domain: Eukaryota
- Kingdom: Animalia
- Phylum: Arthropoda
- Class: Insecta
- Order: Coleoptera
- Suborder: Polyphaga
- Infraorder: Elateriformia
- Family: Buprestidae
- Subfamily: Buprestinae; Lacordaire, 1857

= Buprestinae =

Subfamily of beetles

Buprestinae is a subfamily of beetles in the family Buprestidae, containing the following genera in the tribes Anthaxiini, Buprestini, Chrysobothrini, Melanophilini, and Xenorhipidini:

- Actenodes Dejean, 1833
- Afagrilaxia Bily & Bellamy, 1999
- Afrabothris Thery, 1936
- Agaeocera Saunders, 1871
- Aglaostola Saunders, 1871
- Agrilaxia Kerremans, 1903
- Agrilozodes Thery, 1927
- †Andakhudukia Alexeev, 2008
- Anilara Saunders, 1868
- Anthaxia Eschscholtz, 1829
- Anthaxioides Cobos, 1978
- Anthaxoschema Obenberger, 1923
- Araucariana Levey, 1978
- †Archeobuprestis Bellamy, 2006
- Aristosoma Saunders, 1871
- Augrabies Bellamy, 1987
- Australorhipis Bellamy, 1986
- Balthasarella Obenberger, 1958
- Barakula Peterson, 2000
- Belionota Eschscholtz, 1829
- Bilyaxia Holynski, 1989
- Brachanthaxia Thery, 1930
- Brachelytrium Obenberger, 1923
- †Brachyspathus Wickham, 1917
- Brasilaxia Thery, 1935
- †Brevista Alexeev, 1995
- Bubastes Laporte & Gory, 1836
- Bubastoides Kerremans, 1909
- Buprestina Obenberger, 1923
- Buprestis Linnaeus, 1758
- †Buprestites Heer, 1847
- Calodema Laporte & Gory, 1838
- Calotemognatha Peterson, 1991
- Castiarina Gory & Laporte, 1838
- Ceylonaxia Bily, 1993
- Chalcangium Waterhouse, 1882
- Chalcogenia Saunders, 1871
- Chrysobothris Eschscholtz, 1829
- Cimrmanium Bily, 2009
- Colobogaster Solier, 1833
- Conognatha Eschscholtz, 1829
- Coomaniella Bourgoin, 1924
- †Cretothyrea Alexeev, 1996
- Ctenoderus Germain, 1856
- Cylindrophora Solier, 1849
- Cyrioides Carter, 1920
- Cyrioxus Hoschek, 1925
- Diadoxus Saunders, 1868
- Ditriaena Waterhouse, 1911
- Embrikiola Obenberger, 1928
- †Eolampra Zhang, Sun & Zhang, 1994
- Epistomentis Solier, 1849
- Eudiana Leraut, 1983
- Euryspilus Lacordaire, 1857
- Eurythyrea Dejean, 1833
- Exagistus Deyrolle, 1864
- †Fuesslinia Heer, 1847
- †Glaphyroptera Heer, 1852
- Hesperorhipis Fall, 1930
- Hilarotes Saunders, 1871
- Hiperantha Gistel, 1834
- Hoscheckia Thery, 1925
- Hovorigenium Bellamy, 2007
- †Illolampra Zhang, Sun & Zhang, 1994
- Jakovleviola Obenberger, 1924
- Julodimorpha Gemminger & Harold, 1869
- Juniperella Knull, 1947
- †Jurabuprestis Alexeev, 2000
- Karenaxia Bily, 1993
- Kisanthobia Marseul, 1865
- Knowltonia Fisher, 1935
- Kurosawaia Toyama & Ohmomo, 1985
- †Kzylordyina Alexeev, 1995
- Lamprocheila Saunders, 1869
- Lasionota Mannerheim, 1837
- †Lobites Tillyard & Dunstan, 1923
- †Lomatus Murray, 1860
- Madessetia Bellamy, 2006
- Maoraxia Obenberger, 1924
- Megactenodes Kerremans, 1893
- Melanophila Eschscholtz, 1829
- Melobasis Laporte & Gory, 1837
- Mendizabalia Cobos, 1957
- Merimna Saunders, 1868
- †Mesostigmodera Etheridge & Olliff, 1890
- †Metabuprestium Alexeev, 1995
- Metaxymorpha Parry, 1848
- †Micranthaxia Heer, 1865
- Microcastalia Heller, 1891
- Mixochlorus Waterhouse, 1887
- Nascio Laporte & Gory, 1837
- Nascioides Kerremans, 1903
- Neobubastes Blackburn, 1892
- Neobuprestis Kerremans, 1903
- Neocuris Saunders, 1868
- Notobubastes Carter, 1924
- Notographus Thompson, 1879
- Oaxacanthaxia Bellamy, 1991
- Panapulla Nelson, 2000
- Paractenodes Thery, 1934
- Paracuris Obenberger, 1923
- Paraphrixia Saunders, 1871
- Peronaemis Waterhouse, 1887
- Phaenops Dejean, 1833
- Philandia Germain & Kerremans, 1906
- Philanthaxia Deyrolle, 1864
- †Philanthaxoides Bílý & Kirejtschuk, 2007
- Phrixia Deyrolle, 1864
- †Protogenia Heer, 1847
- Pseudactenodes Kerremans, 1890
- Pseudanilara Thery, 1910
- Pseudhyperantha Saunders, 1869
- †Pseudothyrea Handlirsch, 1908
- Pterobothris Fairmaire & Germain, 1858
- Pygicera Kerremans, 1903
- Romanophora Bily, 2004
- Roswitha Bellamy, 1997
- Selagis Dejean, 1833
- Semiognatha Moore & Lander, 2004
- Senegalisia Bellamy, 1987
- Sinokele Bily, 1989
- Spectralia Casey, 1909
- Sphaerobothris Semenov-Tian-Shanskij & Rikhter, 1934
- Stephansortia Thery, 1925
- Stigmodera Eschscholtz, 1829
- Strandiola Obenberger, 1920
- Temognatha Solier, 1833
- Tetragonoschema Thomson, 1857
- Theryaxia Carter, 1928
- Thomassetia Thery, 1928
- Torresita Gemminger & Harold, 1869
- Trachykele Marseul, 1865
- Trachypteris Kirby, 1837
- Trichinorhipis Barr, 1948
- Trigonogenium Harold, 1869
- Xenomelanophila Sloop, 1937
- Xenorhipis LeConte, 1866
- Zulubuprestis Bellamy, 1991
