= Buprestini =

Scientific classification
- Kingdom: Animalia
- Phylum: Arthropoda
- Clade: Pancrustacea
- Class: Insecta
- Order: Coleoptera
- Suborder: Polyphaga
- Infraorder: Elateriformia
- Family: Buprestidae
- Subfamily: Buprestinae
- Tribe: Buprestini

Tribe of beetles

Buprestini is a tribe of metallic wood-boring beetles in the family Buprestidae. There are about eight genera in Buprestini.

== Subtribes and genera ==
subtribe Agaeocerina Nelson, 1982

1. Agaeocera Saunders, 1871
2. Mixochlorus Waterhouse, 1887
3. Peronaemis Waterhouse, 1887

subtribe Buprestina Leach, 1815

1. Buprestis Linnaeus, 1758
2. Eurythyrea Dejean, 1833

subtribe Lamprocheilina Holyński, 1993

1. Lamprocheila Saunders, 1871

subtribe Trachykelina Holyński, 1988

1. Sinokele Bílý, 1989
2. Trachykele Marseul, 1865
