= Trachypteris =

Trachypteris is the scientific name of two genera of organisms and may refer to:

- Trachypteris (beetle), a genus of beetles in the family
- Trachypteris (plant), a genus of ferns in the family Pteridaceae
