= Roswitha (disambiguation) =

Roswitha was a 10th-century German canoness, dramatist and poet.

Roswitha may also refer to:

- Roswitha Prize, a German-language literature prize for women
- Roswitha (genus), a genus of beetles
- 615 Roswitha, a Main Belt asteroid

Given name

- Roswitha März (born 1940), German mathematician
- Roswitha Esser (born 1941), West German canoeist
- Roswitha Hecke (born 1944), German photographer and photojournalist
- Roswitha Krause (born 1949), German swimmer and handball player
- Roswitha Spohr, West German sprint canoeist
- Roswitha Beier (born 1956), German swimmer
- Roswitha Blind, German mathematician and politician
- Roswitha Fischer, Italian luger
- Roswitha Eberl (b. 1958), East German sprint canoeist
- Roswitha Steiner (born 1963), Austrian Alpine skier
