= Chalcogenia =

Scientific classification
- Kingdom: Animalia
- Phylum: Arthropoda
- Class: Insecta
- Order: Coleoptera
- Suborder: Polyphaga
- Infraorder: Elateriformia
- Family: Buprestidae
- Subfamily: Buprestinae
- Genus: Chalcogenia; Saunders, 1871

Genus of beetles

Chalcogenia is a genus of beetles in the family Buprestidae, subfamily Buprestinae, and tribe Anthaxiini containing the following species:

- Chalcogenia acaciae Descarpentries & Mateu, 1965
- Chalcogenia argodi Kerremans, 1909
- Chalcogenia bicolor Bily, 2008
- Chalcogenia brevicornis Bily, 2008
- Chalcogenia brevis Bily, 2008
- Chalcogenia chrysobothrina Bily, 2008
- Chalcogenia contempta (Mannerheim, 1837)
- Chalcogenia denticulata (Roth, 1851)
- Chalcogenia elegans Bily, 2008
- Chalcogenia elongata Kerremans, 1912
- Chalcogenia embrikiella Obenberger, 1936
- Chalcogenia femorata Kerremans, 1908
- Chalcogenia funebris Obenberger, 1917
- Chalcogenia gracilis Bily, 2008
- Chalcogenia halperini Volkovitsh & Bily, 1997
- Chalcogenia impressicollis (Fahraeus, 1851)
- Chalcogenia jendeki Bily, 2008
- Chalcogenia lindiana Bily, 2008
- Chalcogenia margotana Novak, 2009
- Chalcogenia martini Abeille de Perrin, 1907
- Chalcogenia natalensis Bily, 2008
- Chalcogenia neavei Burgeon, 1941
- Chalcogenia nigra Bily, 2008
- Chalcogenia pilipes Bily, 2008
- Chalcogenia plana Bily, 2008
- Chalcogenia plicata Bily, 2008
- Chalcogenia pseudoacaciae Bily, 2008
- Chalcogenia strandi Obenberger, 1928
- Chalcogenia sulcipennis (Gory, 1841)
- Chalcogenia suturalis Kerremans, 1891
- Chalcogenia theryi Abeille de Perrin, 1897
- Chalcogenia thoracica Obenberger, 1941
- Chalcogenia toroensis Obenberger, 1931
- Chalcogenia ugandae Thery, 1928
- Chalcogenia ugandana Burgeon, 1941
- Chalcogenia viriditarsis Nonfried, 1892
- Chalcogenia werneri Bily, 2008
- Chalcogenia zabranskyi Bily, 2008
