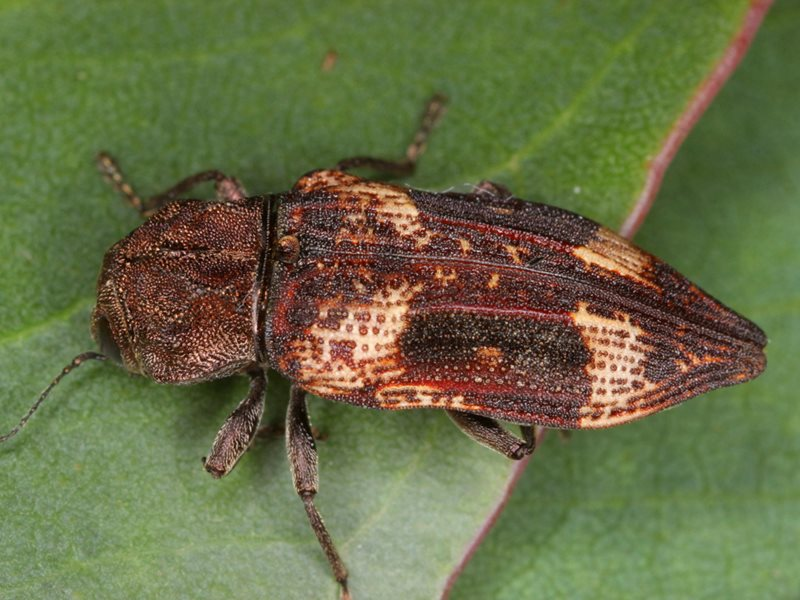
- Nascio vetusta

Scientific classification
- Kingdom: Animalia
- Phylum: Arthropoda
- Class: Insecta
- Order: Coleoptera
- Suborder: Polyphaga
- Infraorder: Elateriformia
- Family: Buprestidae
- Subfamily: Buprestinae
- Tribe: Nascionini
- Subtribe: Nascionina
- Genus: Nascio; Gory & Laporte, 1838

Synonyms
- Geronia Dejean, 1833; Heliotes Gistl, 1848

= Nascio (beetle) =

Genus of beetles

Nascio is a genus of Jewel Beetles in the beetle family Buprestidae. There are at least four described species in Nascio, found in Australasia.

== Species ==
These four species belong to the genus Nascio:

- Nascio chydaea Olliff, 1886
- Nascio simillima van de Poll, 1886
- Nascio vetusta (Boisduval, 1835)
- Nascio xanthura (Gory & Laporte, 1839)
