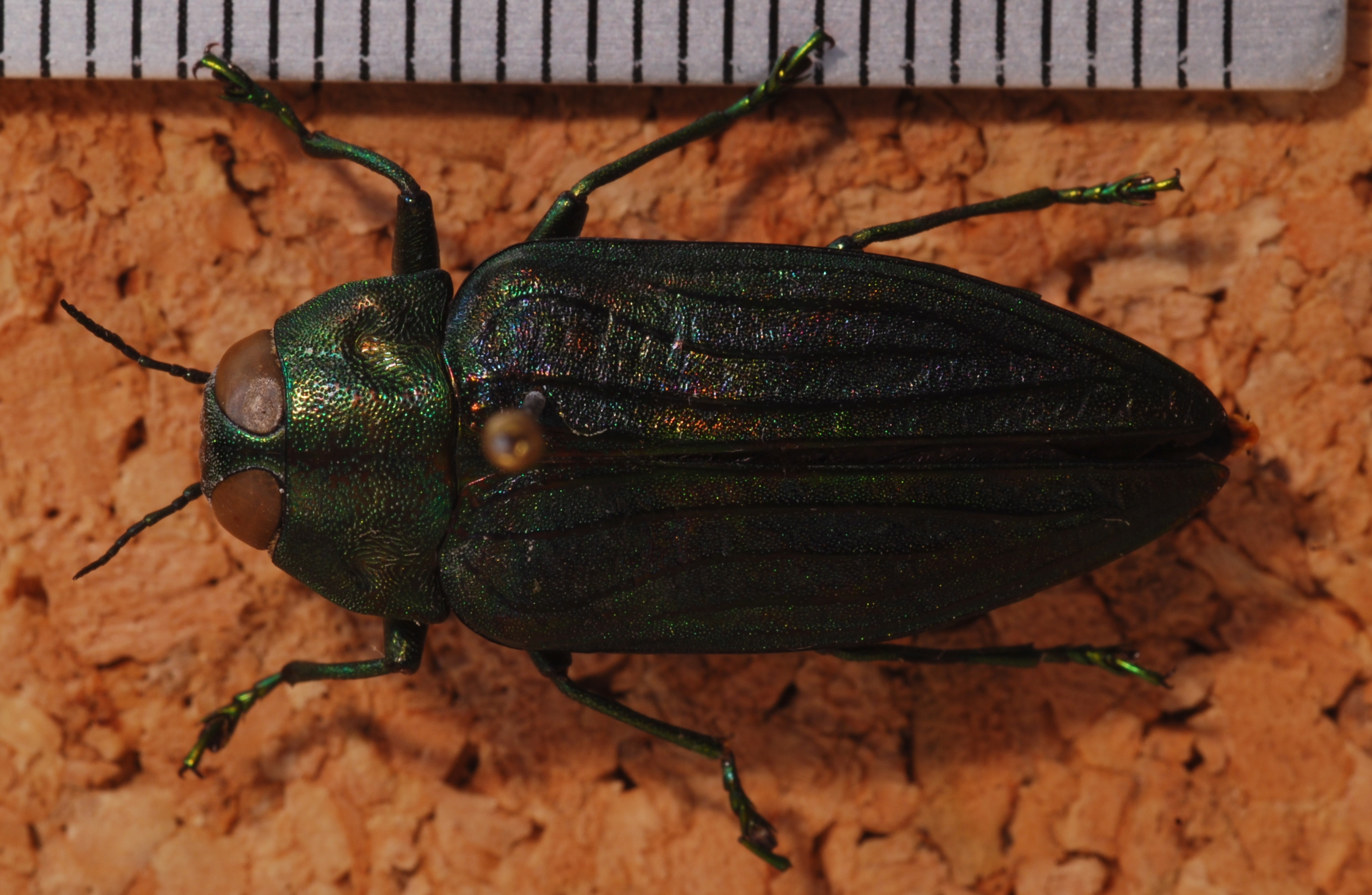
- Megactenodes unicolor

Scientific classification
- Kingdom: Animalia
- Phylum: Arthropoda
- Class: Insecta
- Order: Coleoptera
- Suborder: Polyphaga
- Infraorder: Elateriformia
- Family: Buprestidae
- Subfamily: Buprestinae
- Genus: Megactenodes; Kerreman, 1893

= Megactenodes =

Genus of beetles

Megactenodes is a genus of beetles in the family Buprestidae, subfamily Buprestinae, and Tribe Actenodini containing the following species:

- Megactenodes aenea (Thomson, 1878)
- Megactenodes capitosa Thery, 1934
- Megactenodes chrysifrons (Quedenfeldt, 1886)
- Megactenodes cupriventris Kerremans, 1912
- Megactenodes ebenina (Quedenfeldt, 1886)
- Megactenodes levior (Quedenfeldt, 1886)
- Megactenodes raffrayi Thery, 1930
- Megactenodes reticulata (Klug, 1855)
- Megactenodes tenuecostata (Quedenfeldt, 1886)
- Megactenodes unicolor (Gory & Laporte, 1837)
- Megactenodes westermanni (Gory & Laporte, 1838)
