= Pseudactenodes =

Scientific classification
- Kingdom: Animalia
- Phylum: Arthropoda
- Clade: Pancrustacea
- Class: Insecta
- Order: Coleoptera
- Suborder: Polyphaga
- Infraorder: Elateriformia
- Family: Buprestidae
- Subfamily: Buprestinae
- Genus: Pseudactenodes; Kerremans, 1890

Genus of beetles

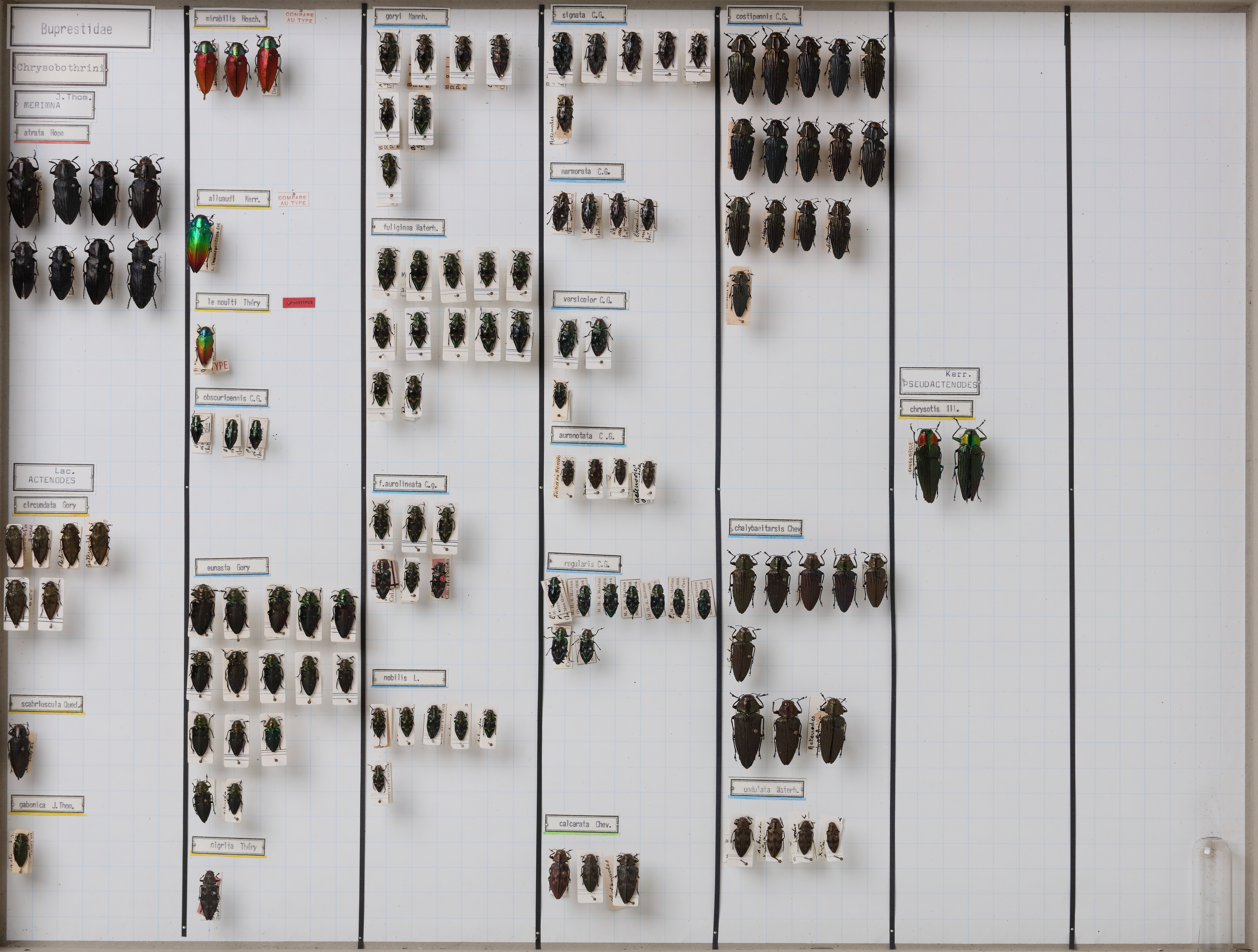
Specimens of beetles, including the Pseudactenodes (furthest to the right)

Pseudactenodes is a genus of beetles in the family Buprestidae, subfamily Buprestinae, and tribe Actenodini.

== Species & Subspecies ==
The genus contains the following species, along with two subspecies:

- Pseudactenodes chrysotis (Illiger, 1800)
  - Pseudactenodes chrysotis camerunicus Obenberger, 1922
  - Pseudactenodes chrysotis vitticollis (Harold, 1878)
- Pseudactenodes schmidti (Quedenfeldt, 1890)
