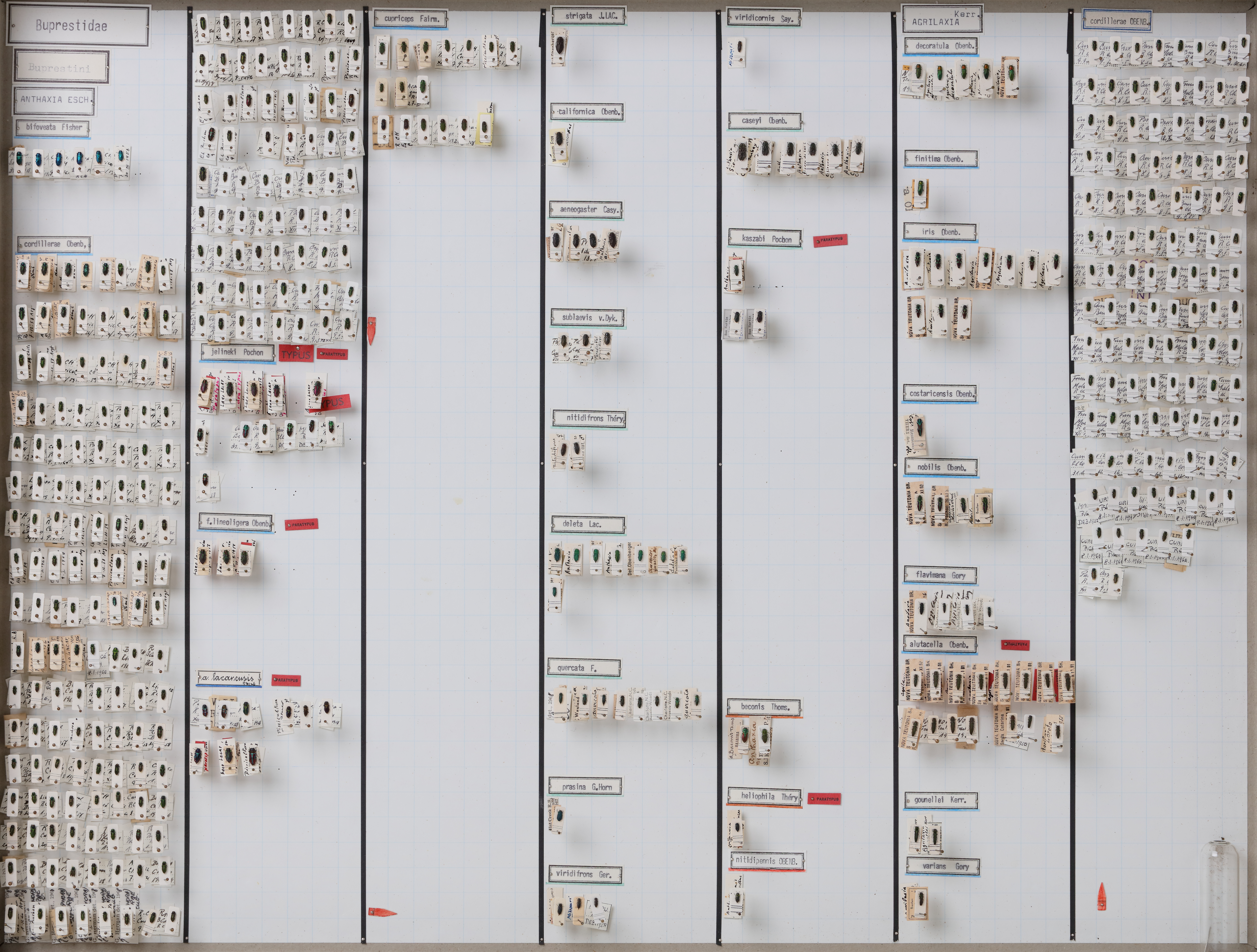

Scientific classification
- Kingdom: Animalia
- Phylum: Arthropoda
- Class: Insecta
- Order: Coleoptera
- Suborder: Polyphaga
- Infraorder: Elateriformia
- Family: Buprestidae
- Subfamily: Buprestinae
- Genus: Bilyaxia; Holynski, 1989

= Bilyaxia =

Genus of beetles

Bilyaxia is a genus of beetles in the family Buprestidae, Subfamily Buprestinae, and Tribe Anthaxiini containing the following species:

- Bilyaxia bruchiana (Obenberger, 1928)
- Bilyaxia bucki (Cobos, 1956)
- Bilyaxia cinctipennis (Kerremans, 1913)
- Bilyaxia concinna (Mannerheim, 1837)
- Bilyaxia cordillerae (Obenberger, 1928)
- Bilyaxia cupriceps (Fairmaire & Germain, 1858)
- Bilyaxia descaprentriesi (Cobos, 1956)
- Bilyaxia emmanueli (Cobos, 1972)
- Bilyaxia maculicollis (Kerremans, 1887)
- Bilyaxia mariae (Cobos, 1956)
- Bilyaxia obscurata (Reed, 1873)
- Bilyaxia rubricollis (Moore, 1981)
- Bilyaxia willineri (Cobos, 1972)
