= Brachelytrium =

Scientific classification
- Kingdom: Animalia
- Phylum: Arthropoda
- Class: Insecta
- Order: Coleoptera
- Suborder: Polyphaga
- Infraorder: Elateriformia
- Family: Buprestidae
- Genus: Brachelytrium; Obenberger, 1923

Genus of beetles

Brachelytrium is a genus of beetles in the family Buprestidae, subfamily Buprestinae, and tribe Anthaxiini containing the following species:

- Brachelytrium aeneum Bily & Bellamy, 2010
- Brachelytrium africanum (Pochon, 1972)
- Brachelytrium beninense Bily & Bellamy, 2010
- Brachelytrium blairi Obenberger, 1931
- Brachelytrium caeruleum Bily & Bellamy, 2010
- Brachelytrium cavifrons Bily & Bellamy, 2000
- Brachelytrium cordinotum Bily & Bellamy, 2000
- Brachelytrium fissifrons Bily & Bellamy, 2000
- Brachelytrium globicolle Bily & Bellamy, 2000
- Brachelytrium holmi Bily & Bellamy, 2000
- Brachelytrium jemeni Brechtel, 2000
- Brachelytrium lesnei (Thery, 1934)
- Brachelytrium mauritanicum Bily & Bellamy, 2010
- Brachelytrium metallicum Bily & Bellamy, 2010
- Brachelytrium minusculum Obenberger, 1928
- Brachelytrium namibiense Bily & Bellamy, 2000
- Brachelytrium niehuisi Bily & Bellamy, 2010
- Brachelytrium nigrum Bily & Bellamy, 2010
- Brachelytrium prolongum Bily & Bellamy, 2000
- Brachelytrium purpureiventre Bily & Bellamy, 2010
- Brachelytrium straussae Bily & Bellamy, 2000
- Brachelytrium tanzaniense Bily & Bellamy, 2000
- Brachelytrium transvaalense Obenberger, 1923
- Brachelytrium ventrale (Kerremans, 1911)
- Brachelytrium waterbergense Bily & Bellamy, 2000
