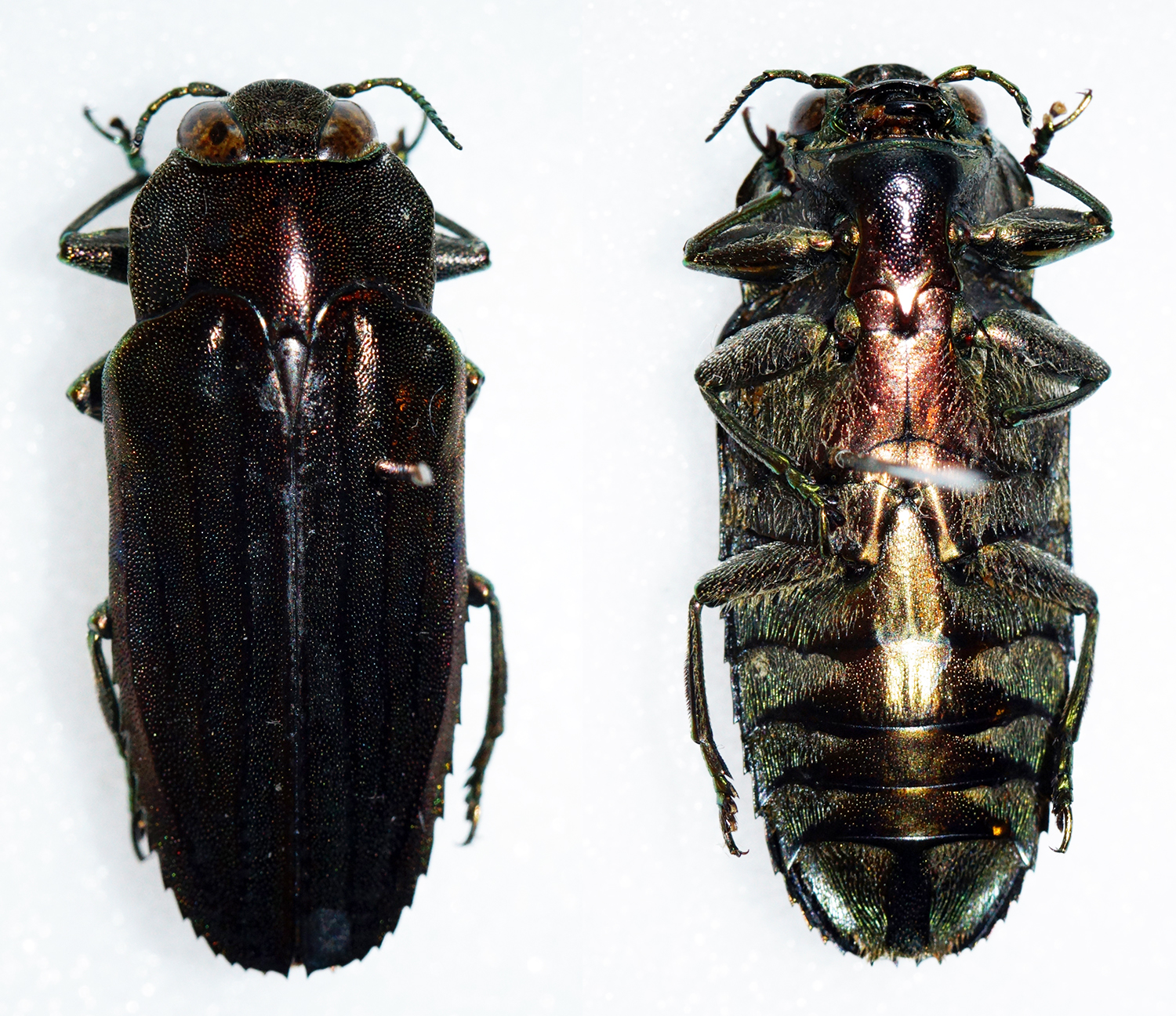

Scientific classification
- Kingdom: Animalia
- Phylum: Arthropoda
- Class: Insecta
- Order: Coleoptera
- Suborder: Polyphaga
- Infraorder: Elateriformia
- Family: Buprestidae
- Tribe: Chrysobothrini
- Genus: Afrabothris; Thery, 1936
- Species: A. nigrita

Binomial name
- Afrabothris nigrita (Olivier, 1790)

= Afrabothris =

Afrabothris nigrita

Genus of beetles

Afrabothris nigrita is a species of beetle in the family Buprestidae, subfamily Buprestinae, Tribe Chrysobothrini and it is the only species in the genus Afrabothris.
