= Tetragonoschema =

Scientific classification
- Kingdom: Animalia
- Phylum: Arthropoda
- Clade: Pancrustacea
- Class: Insecta
- Order: Coleoptera
- Suborder: Polyphaga
- Infraorder: Elateriformia
- Family: Buprestidae
- Subfamily: Buprestinae
- Genus: Tetragonoschema; Thomson, 1857

Genus of beetles

Tetragonoschema is a genus of beetles in the family Buprestidae, subfamily Buprestinae, and tribe Anthaxiini. There are 17 species in the genus, which is distributed throughout the Americas from Mexico to Patagonia.

Species include:

- Tetragonoschema aeneum Kerremans, 1899
- Tetragonoschema albopilosum Hoscheck, 1931
- Tetragonoschema alvarengai Cobos, 1972
- Tetragonoschema argentiniense (Obenberger, 1915)
- Tetragonoschema brasiliae Obenberger, 1922
- Tetragonoschema brasiliense (Kerremans, 1897)
- Tetragonoschema caerulans Théry, 1944
- Tetragonoschema crassum Théry, 1944
- Tetragonoschema cupreocingulatum Hoscheck, 1931
- Tetragonoschema darlingtoni Théry, 1944
- Tetragonoschema fallaciosum Théry, 1944
- Tetragonoschema fossicolle Kerremans, 1900
- Tetragonoschema grouvellei Théry, 1944
- Tetragonoschema humerale Waterhouse, 1882
- Tetragonoschema latum Théry, 1944
- Tetragonoschema medium Obenberger, 1922
- Tetragonoschema missionarium Obenberger, 1947
- Tetragonoschema nanum Obenberger, 1922
- Tetragonoschema opacicolle Théry, 1944
- Tetragonoschema patagonicum Obenberger, 1922
- Tetragonoschema pujoli Théry, 1944
- Tetragonoschema purpurascens Kerremans, 1897
- Tetragonoschema pygmaeum Théry, 1944
- Tetragonoschema quadratum (Buquet, 1841)
- Tetragonoschema rubromarginatum Théry, 1944
- Tetragonoschema santafeanum Obenberger, 1947
- Tetragonoschema strandi Obenberger, 1924
- Tetragonoschema sulci Obenberger, 1932
- Tetragonoschema tigrense Obenberger, 1947
- Tetragonoschema torresi Cobos, 1959
- Tetragonoschema trinidadense Bellamy, 1991
- Tetragonoschema tucumanum Cobos, 1949
- Tetragonoschema undatum (Steinheil, 1874)
- Tetragonoschema vianai Obenberger, 1947
- Tetragonoschema vicinum Théry, 1944
