= Chalcogenia elegans =

Scientific classification
- Kingdom: Animalia
- Phylum: Arthropoda
- Class: Insecta
- Order: Coleoptera
- Suborder: Polyphaga
- Infraorder: Elateriformia
- Family: Buprestidae
- Genus: Chalcogenia
- Species: C. elegans

Binomial name
- Chalcogenia elegans Bily, 2008

Species of beetle

Chalcogenia elegans is a beetle species in the genus Chalcogenia.
