= Zulubuprestis =

Scientific classification
- Kingdom: Animalia
- Phylum: Arthropoda
- Class: Insecta
- Order: Coleoptera
- Suborder: Polyphaga
- Infraorder: Elateriformia
- Family: Buprestidae
- Genus: Zulubuprestis; Bellamy, 1991
- Species: Z. reliquia

Binomial name
- Zulubuprestis reliquia Bellamy, 1991

Genus of beetles

Zulubuprestis is a monotypic genus of beetles in the family Buprestidae, the jewel beetles. The sole species is Zulubuprestis reliquia. It is known only from South Africa.

This beetle was described from a specimen collected in 1937 in the N'Kandhla Forest of South Africa, in a region then known as Zululand. It is elongated and flattened in shape, with large eyes. The type specimen was a female measuring 1.6 centimeters long. It is iridescent blue-green in color, darker on the top surface and lighter beneath. The abdomen is brown with a blue-green sheen.

This beetle is similar to those of the genus Neobuprestis.
