= Eudiana =

Scientific classification
- Kingdom: Animalia
- Phylum: Arthropoda
- Class: Insecta
- Order: Coleoptera
- Suborder: Polyphaga
- Infraorder: Elateriformia
- Family: Buprestidae
- Tribe: Melanophilini
- Genus: Eudiana; Leraut, 1983

Genus of beetles

Eudiana is a genus of beetles in the family Buprestidae, subfamily Buprestinae and tribe Melanophilini containing the following species:

- Eudiana aeneipennis (Laporte & Gory, 1837)
- Eudiana aeneocuprea (Kerremans, 1903)
- Eudiana antiqua (Kerremans, 1899)
- Eudiana azteca (Obenberger, 1932)
- Eudiana bahiana (Kerremans, 1897)
- Eudiana catharinae (Thery, 1910)
- Eudiana chevrolati (Saunders, 1871)
- Eudiana chrysoloma (Mannerheim, 1837)
- Eudiana cupricollis (Kerremans, 1899)
- Eudiana dentipennis (Laporte & Gory, 1837)
- Eudiana foveola (Obenberger, 1932)
- Eudiana gebhardti (Obenberger, 1924)
- Eudiana gounellei (Kerremans, 1897)
- Eudiana goyazensis (Obenberger, 1932)
- Eudiana guianensis (Chevrolat, 1838)
- Eudiana inflammata (Laporte & Gory, 1837)
- Eudiana inornata (Gory, 1840)
- Eudiana klapaleki (Obenberger, 1924)
- Eudiana laevipennis (Kerremans, 1899)
- Eudiana limbata (Waterhouse, 1882)
- Eudiana minarum (Obenberger, 1932)
- Eudiana oberthuri (Kerremans, 1897)
- Eudiana obliquata (Laporte & Gory, 1837)
- Eudiana orientalis (Burmeister, 1872)
- Eudiana prasina (Mannerheim, 1837)
- Eudiana skrlandti (Obenberger, 1932)
- Eudiana subcuprea (Erichson, 1848)
- Eudiana viridiobscura (Laporte & Gory, 1837)
