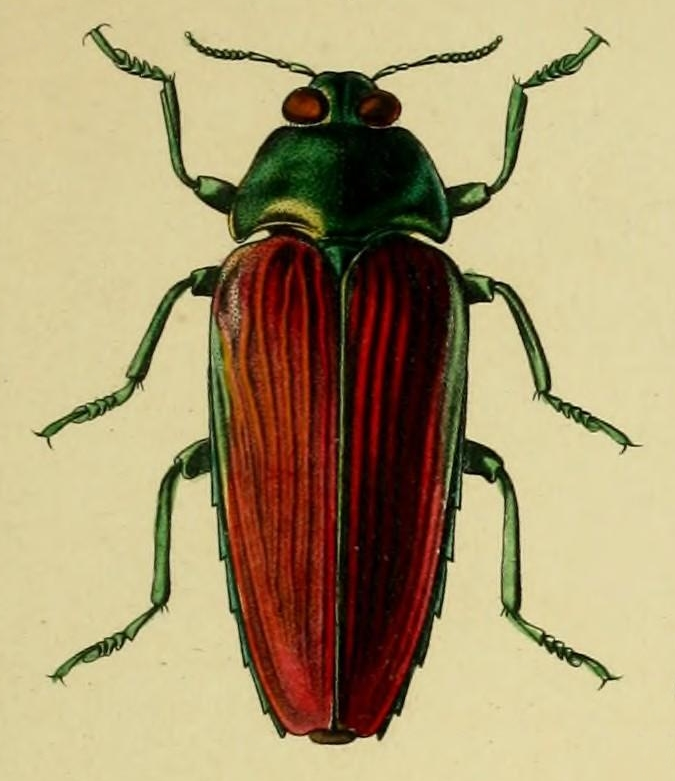
- Colobogaster desmarestii

Scientific classification
- Kingdom: Animalia
- Phylum: Arthropoda
- Class: Insecta
- Order: Coleoptera
- Suborder: Polyphaga
- Infraorder: Elateriformia
- Family: Buprestidae
- Genus: Colobogaster; Solier, 1833

= Colobogaster =

Genus of beetles

Colobogaster is a genus of beetles in the family Buprestidae, subfamily Buprestinae, Tribe Chrysobothrini containing the following species:

- Colobogaster acostae Rojas, 1856
- Colobogaster amorosa Obenberger, 1952
- Colobogaster anchoralis Obenberger, 1932
- Colobogaster annei Gory, 1841
- Colobogaster apolinari Obenberger, 1932
- Colobogaster aureoviridis Fisher, 1933
- Colobogaster aurora Obenberger, 1952
- Colobogaster belemensis Obenberger, 1952
- Colobogaster bella Kirsch, 1873
- Colobogaster biguttata Kerremans, 1897
- Colobogaster boliviana Obenberger, 1952
- Colobogaster bourgoini Obenberger, 1928
- Colobogaster cayennensis (Herbst, 1801)
- Colobogaster celsa (Erichson, 1848)
- Colobogaster chlorosticta (Klug, 1825)
- Colobogaster croesa Obenberger, 1922
- Colobogaster cupricollis Kerremans, 1897
- Colobogaster cyanitarsis Gory & Laporte, 1837
- Colobogaster decorata Thomson, 1878
- Colobogaster desmarestii Deyrolle, 1862
- Colobogaster diversicolor Thomson, 1879
- Colobogaster diviana Gory, 1841
- Colobogaster ecuadorica Obenberger, 1928
- Colobogaster embrikiella Obenberger, 1936
- Colobogaster empyrea (Gory, 1832)
- Colobogaster equadorica Obenberger, 1928
- Colobogaster eximia Gory, 1841
- Colobogaster geniculata Théry, 1920
- Colobogaster gigas Fisher, 1933
- Colobogaster goryi Obenberger, 1934
- Colobogaster hustachei Théry, 1920
- Colobogaster incisifrons Théry, 1920
- Colobogaster infraviridis Thomson, 1879
- Colobogaster itaitubensis Théry, 1936
- Colobogaster jacquieri Gory, 1841
- Colobogaster lemoulti Théry, 1946
- Colobogaster martinezi Cobos, 1966
- Colobogaster modesta Théry, 1920
- Colobogaster nickerli Obenberger, 1952
- Colobogaster paraensis Kogan, 1965
- Colobogaster peruviana Obenberger, 1924
- Colobogaster pizarroi Cobos, 1966
- Colobogaster puncticollis Waterhouse, 1887
- Colobogaster quadridentata (Fabricius, 1793)
- Colobogaster quadriimpressa Thomson, 1878
- Colobogaster resplendens Gory, 1841
- Colobogaster rotundicollis Obenberger, 1928
- Colobogaster seabrai Kogan, 1965
- Colobogaster seximpressa Théry, 1911
- Colobogaster singularis Gory, 1841
- Colobogaster soror Théry, 1936
- Colobogaster splendida (Lucas, 1858)
- Colobogaster strandi Obenberger, 1928
- Colobogaster sulci Obenberger, 1932
- Colobogaster triloba (Olivier, 1790)
- Colobogaster weingaertneri Hoscheck, 1931
- Colobogaster weyrauchi Cobos, 1966
