= Protogenia =

Protogenia escheri

Scientific classification
- Kingdom: Animalia
- Phylum: Arthropoda
- Class: Insecta
- Order: Coleoptera
- Suborder: Polyphaga
- Infraorder: Elateriformia
- Family: Buprestidae
- Genus: Protogenia; Heer, 1847
- Species: P. escheri

Binomial name
- Protogenia escheri Heer, 1847

Genus of beetles

Protogenia escheri is a fossil species of beetles in the family Buprestidae, the only species in the genus Protogenia.
