= Cylindrophora =

Scientific classification
- Kingdom: Animalia
- Phylum: Arthropoda
- Class: Insecta
- Order: Coleoptera
- Suborder: Polyphaga
- Infraorder: Elateriformia
- Family: Buprestidae
- Genus: Cylindrophora; Solier, 1849

Genus of beetles

Cylindrophora is a genus of beetles in the family Buprestidae, containing the following species:

- Cylindrophora auronotata (Bily, 1978)
- Cylindrophora mrazi (Obenberger, 1932)
