= Araucariana =

Araucariana queenslandica

Scientific classification
- Kingdom: Animalia
- Phylum: Arthropoda
- Class: Insecta
- Order: Coleoptera
- Suborder: Polyphaga
- Infraorder: Elateriformia
- Family: Buprestidae
- Genus: Araucariana; Levey, 1978
- Species: A. queenslandica

Binomial name
- Araucariana queenslandica Levey, 1978

Genus of beetles

Araucariana queenslandica is a species of beetles in the family Buprestidae, the only species in the genus Araucariana.
