= Brachyspathus =

Brachyspathus curiosus

Scientific classification
- Kingdom: Animalia
- Phylum: Arthropoda
- Class: Insecta
- Order: Coleoptera
- Suborder: Polyphaga
- Infraorder: Elateriformia
- Family: Buprestidae
- Genus: Brachyspathus; Wickham, 1917
- Species: B. curiosus

Binomial name
- Brachyspathus curiosus Wickham, 1917

Genus of beetles

Brachyspathus curiosus is a fossil species of beetles in the family Buprestidae, the only species in the genus Brachyspathus.
