= Brasilaxia =

Brasilaxia costifera

Scientific classification
- Kingdom: Animalia
- Phylum: Arthropoda
- Clade: Pancrustacea
- Class: Insecta
- Order: Coleoptera
- Suborder: Polyphaga
- Infraorder: Elateriformia
- Family: Buprestidae
- Genus: Brasilaxia; Thery, 1935
- Species: B. costifera

Binomial name
- Brasilaxia costifera (Obenberger, 1913)

Genus of beetles

Brasilaxia is a genus of beetles in the family Buprestidae. It is monotypic, being represented by the single species Brasilaxia costifera.
