= Strandiola =

Strandiola paradoxa

Scientific classification
- Kingdom: Animalia
- Phylum: Arthropoda
- Class: Insecta
- Order: Coleoptera
- Suborder: Polyphaga
- Infraorder: Elateriformia
- Family: Buprestidae
- Genus: Strandiola; Obenberger, 1902
- Species: S. paradoxa

Binomial name
- Strandiola paradoxa Obenberger, 1920

Genus of beetles

Strandiola paradoxa is a species of beetles in the family Buprestidae, the only species in the genus Strandiola.
