= Cyrioxus =

Cyrioxus caledonicus

Scientific classification
- Kingdom: Animalia
- Phylum: Arthropoda
- Class: Insecta
- Order: Coleoptera
- Suborder: Polyphaga
- Infraorder: Elateriformia
- Family: Buprestidae
- Genus: Cyrioxus; Hoscheck, 1925
- Species: C. caledonicus

Binomial name
- Cyrioxus caledonicus Hoscheck, 1925

Genus of beetles

Cyrioxus caledonicus is a species of beetles in the family Buprestidae, the only species in the genus Cyrioxus.
