= Euryspilus =

Scientific classification
- Kingdom: Animalia
- Phylum: Arthropoda
- Class: Insecta
- Order: Coleoptera
- Suborder: Polyphaga
- Infraorder: Elateriformia
- Family: Buprestidae
- Genus: Euryspilus; Lacordaire, 1857

Genus of beetles

Euryspilus is a genus of beetles in the family Buprestidae, containing the following species:

- Euryspilus australis (Blackburn, 1887)
- Euryspilus caudatus (Thery, 1910)
- Euryspilus chalcodes (Gory & Laporte, 1838)
- Euryspilus viridis Carter, 1924
