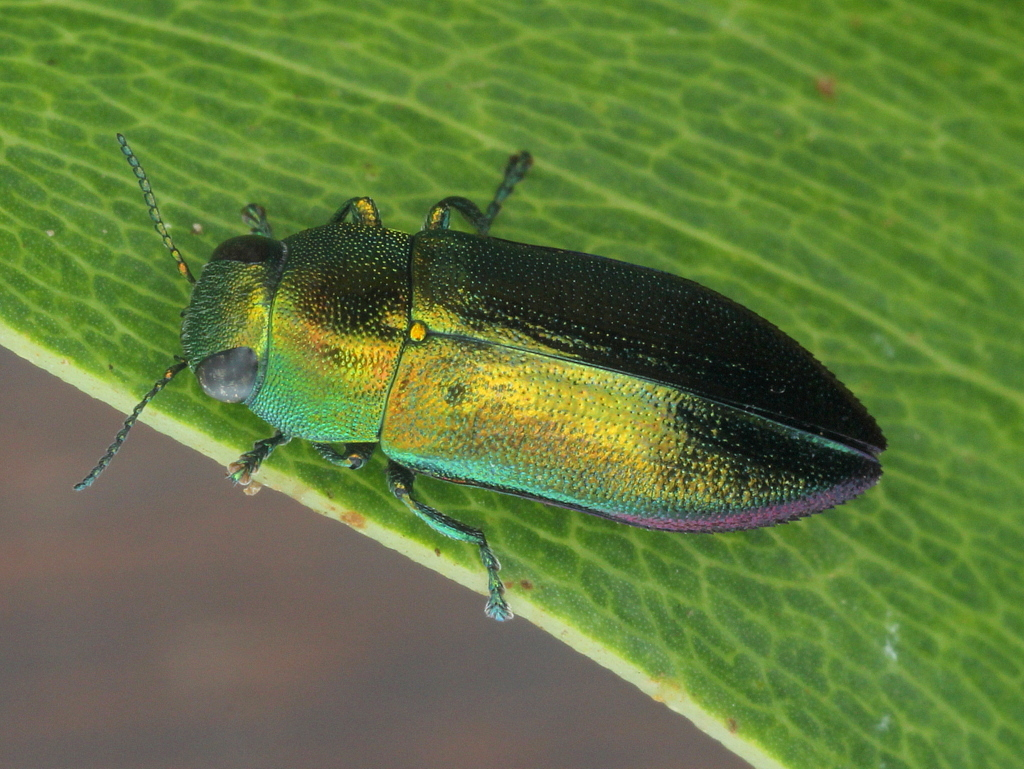

Scientific classification
- Kingdom: Animalia
- Phylum: Arthropoda
- Class: Insecta
- Order: Coleoptera
- Suborder: Polyphaga
- Infraorder: Elateriformia
- Family: Buprestidae
- Genus: Melobasis; Laporte & Gory, 1837

= Melobasis =

Genus of beetles

Melobasis is a genus of beetles in the family Buprestidae, containing the following species:

- Melobasis abigailae Hawkeswood & Turner, 2009
- Melobasis abnormis Carter, 1923
- Melobasis adonis (Obenberger, 1938)
- Melobasis aenea Kerremans, 1903
- Melobasis aeneipennis Deyrolle, 1864
- Melobasis albertisii Théry, 1923
- Melobasis andersoni Blackburn, 1887
- Melobasis apicalis Macleay, 1872
- Melobasis aruensis Théry, 1923
- Melobasis aurata Deyrolle, 1864
- Melobasis auribasis Fauvel, 1891
- Melobasis auricollis (Kerremans, 1895)
- Melobasis aurocincta Carter, 1930
- Melobasis aurocyanea Carter, 1937
- Melobasis austera Théry, 1923
- Melobasis australis (Thomson, 1879)
- Melobasis bellula Carter, 1939
- Melobasis bimetallica Carter, 1923
- Melobasis brevicollis (Théry, 1937)
- Melobasis browni Carter, 1937
- Melobasis buprestoides (Obenberger, 1922)
- Melobasis buruana (Obenberger, 1932)
- Melobasis caledonica (Obenberger, 1923)
- Melobasis callichloris Kerremans, 1898
- Melobasis candens Obenberger, 1942
- Melobasis caudata Carter, 1923
- Melobasis chrysobothroides Deyrolle, 1864
- Melobasis chrysomelina Théry, 1911
- Melobasis circumflexa Kerremans, 1888
- Melobasis coerulea Kerremans, 1892
- Melobasis conica (Laporte & Gory, 1837)
- Melobasis conicicollis Obenberger, 1942
- Melobasis connicki Baudon, 1968
- Melobasis costata Macleay, 1872
- Melobasis costifera Thomson, 1879
- Melobasis cruentata Thomson, 1879
- Melobasis cupreoaenea Fairmaire, 1878
- Melobasis cupreovittata Saunders, 1876
- Melobasis cupriceps (Kirby, 1818)
- Melobasis cupricollis Kerremans, 1898
- Melobasis cuprina Kerremans, 1898
- Melobasis curta Kerremans, 1903
- Melobasis cyaneipennis Boheman, 1858
- Melobasis derbyensis Blackburn, 1892
- Melobasis dives Carter, 1923
- Melobasis dohertyi Théry, 1923
- Melobasis eichhorni Théry, 1923
- Melobasis elderi Blackburn, 1892
- Melobasis empyria Olliff, 1889
- Melobasis epistomalis Obenberger, 1942
- Melobasis fairmairei Kerremans, 1903
- Melobasis fasciata Carter, 1923
- Melobasis formosa Carter, 1923
- Melobasis fulgurans Thomson, 1879
- Melobasis gloriosa (Laporte & Gory, 1837)
- Melobasis gratiosissima Thomson, 1879
- Melobasis hesperica (Pochon, 1967)
- Melobasis hoscheki (Obenberger, 1916)
- Melobasis hypocrita Erichson, 1842
- Melobasis igniceps Saunders, 1876
- Melobasis ignipicta Kerremans, 1900
- Melobasis illidgei Carter, 1923
- Melobasis incerta Kerremans, 1892
- Melobasis innocua Thomson, 1879
- Melobasis insularis (Théry, 1923)
- Melobasis interstitialis Blackburn, 1900
- Melobasis intricata Deyrolle, 1864
- Melobasis iridicolor Carter, 1923
- Melobasis jacquelinae Turner & Hawkeswood, 2003
- Melobasis jakowleffi Kerremans, 1903
- Melobasis kaszabi (Pochon, 1967)
- Melobasis kietana Obenberger, 1938
- Melobasis lathami (Laporte & Gory, 1837)
- Melobasis latifrons (Kerremans, 1892)
- Melobasis lauta Macleay, 1888
- Melobasis lixi Théry, 1923
- Melobasis lugubrina Kerremans, 1900
- Melobasis lugubris Théry, 1923
- Melobasis macleayana Obenberger, 1930
- Melobasis macleayi Kerremans, 1892
- Melobasis maculata (Deyrolle, 1864)
- Melobasis marlooensis Carter, 1937
- Melobasis meeki Théry, 1923
- Melobasis melanura Kerremans, 1898
- Melobasis metallifera Saunders, 1868
- Melobasis meyricki Blackburn, 1887
- Melobasis modesta Lansberge, 1880
- Melobasis monticola Blackburn, 1892
- Melobasis myallae Carter, 1932
- Melobasis naias Obenberger, 1942
- Melobasis nervosa (Boisduval, 1835)
- Melobasis nickerli (Obenberger, 1938)
- Melobasis nigriventris Obenberger, 1942
- Melobasis nitidiventris Kerremans, 1898
- Melobasis nobilitata Thomson, 1879
- Melobasis novaeguineae Bellamy, 2003
- Melobasis obscurata (Obenberger, 1924)
- Melobasis obscurella Thomson, 1879
- Melobasis occidentalis Carter, 1923
- Melobasis oleomaculata (Obenberger, 1938)
- Melobasis paitana Fauvel, 1891
- Melobasis papuana (Obenberger, 1924)
- Melobasis parvula Carter, 1930
- Melobasis picticollis Carter, 1923
- Melobasis prisca Erichson, 1842
- Melobasis prolongata (Obenberger, 1922)
- Melobasis prominens Obenberger, 1942
- Melobasis propinqua (Laporte & Gory, 1837)
- Melobasis pseudovittata Obenberger, 1942
- Melobasis psilopteroides Théry, 1923
- Melobasis purpurascens (Fabricius, 1801)
- Melobasis purpuriceps Saunders, 1867
- Melobasis pusilla Carter, 1928
- Melobasis quadrinotata Carter, 1923
- Melobasis quinquemaculata Théry, 1923
- Melobasis radiola Carter, 1934
- Melobasis regalis Carter, 1923
- Melobasis ribbei Théry, 1923
- Melobasis robusta Carter, 1923
- Melobasis rothei Blackburn, 1887
- Melobasis rothschildi Théry, 1923
- Melobasis rouyeri Théry, 1911
- Melobasis scintillans Obenberger, 1942
- Melobasis scutata Fauvel, 1891
- Melobasis scutellaris (Deyrolle, 1864)
- Melobasis semimarginata Obenberger, 1942
- Melobasis septemplagiata Carter, 1923
- Melobasis serrata Montrouzier, 1860
- Melobasis sexplagiata (Laporte & Gory, 1837)
- Melobasis simplex (Germar, 1848)
- Melobasis smaragdifrons (Obenberger, 1922)
- Melobasis spinosa Carter, 1939
- Melobasis splendida (Donovan, 1805)
- Melobasis ssp. tenebrosa (Obenberger), 1924
- Melobasis stevensi (Théry, 1937)
- Melobasis strandi Obenberger, 1938
- Melobasis subconica Carter, 1923
- Melobasis superba (Laporte & Gory, 1837)
- Melobasis terminata Kerremans, 1898
- Melobasis thoracica Blackburn, 1887
- Melobasis timoriensis Théry, 1935
- Melobasis trifasciata (Gory & Laporte, 1837)
- Melobasis tristis (Kerremans, 1900)
- Melobasis uniformis Carter, 1923
- Melobasis vanderwieli Obenberger, 1938
- Melobasis variabilis Lansberge, 1880
- Melobasis variegata (Théry, 1937)
- Melobasis vertebralis Carter, 1923
- Melobasis victoriae Obenberger, 1942
- Melobasis viridiaurata Deyrolle, 1864
- Melobasis viridiceps Saunders, 1876
- Melobasis viridicolor (Obenberger, 1930)
- Melobasis viridifrons Kerremans, 1896
- Melobasis viridipes Fauvel, 1891
- Melobasis viridisterna Carter, 1939
- Melobasis vittata Blackburn, 1887
- Melobasis wannerua Carter, 1936
- Melobasis woodlarkianus Théry, 1923
