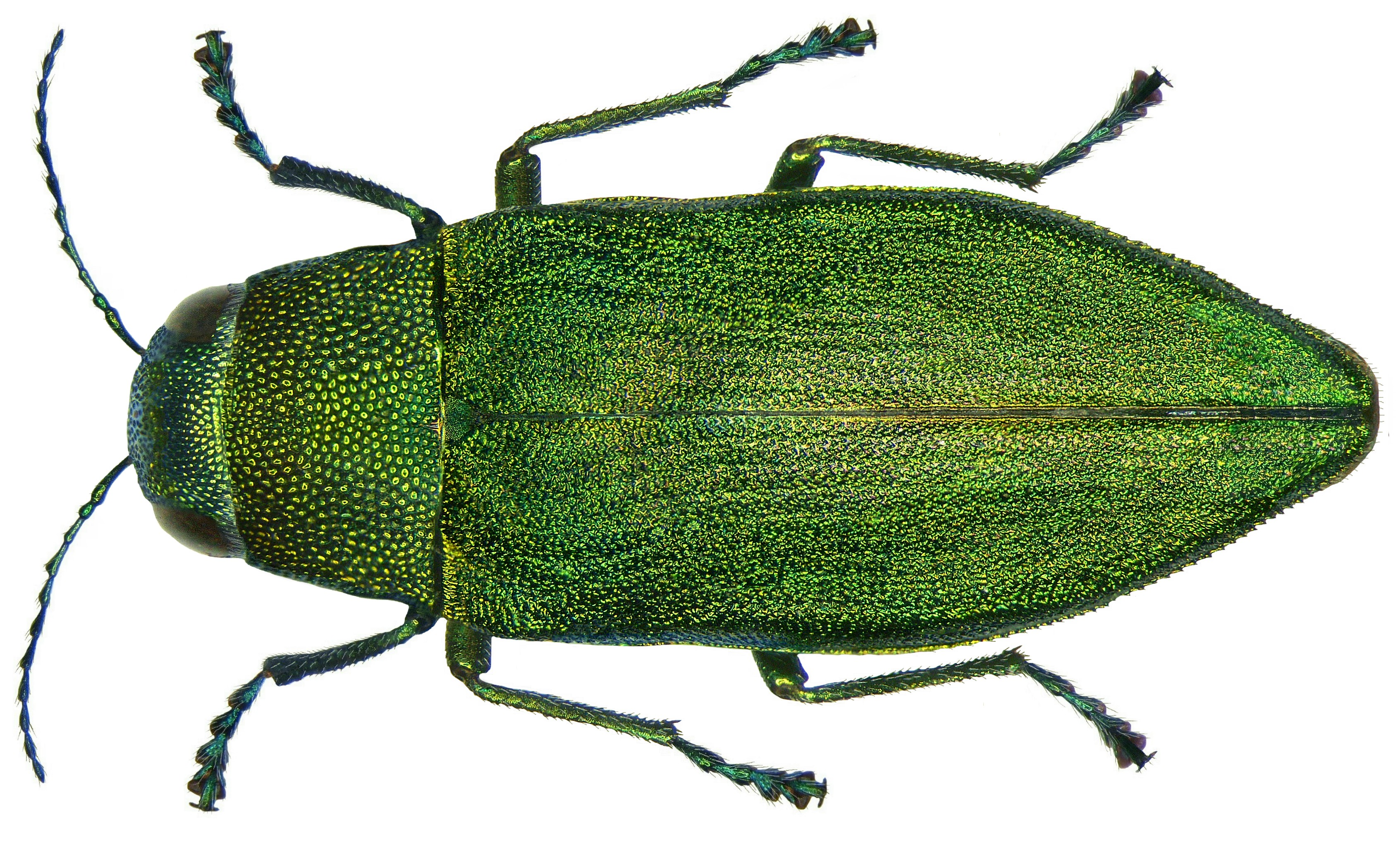
- Kisanthobia ariasi

Scientific classification
- Kingdom: Animalia
- Phylum: Arthropoda
- Class: Insecta
- Order: Coleoptera
- Suborder: Polyphaga
- Infraorder: Elateriformia
- Family: Buprestidae
- Genus: Kisanthobia; Marseul, 1865
- Species: K. ariasi

Binomial name
- Kisanthobia ariasi (Robert, 1858)

= Kisanthobia =

Kisanthobia ariasi

Genus of beetles

Kisanthobia ariasi is a species of beetles in the family Buprestidae, the only species in the genus Kisanthobia.
