= Mesostigmodera =

Scientific classification
- Kingdom: Animalia
- Phylum: Arthropoda
- Class: Insecta
- Order: Coleoptera
- Suborder: Polyphaga
- Infraorder: Elateriformia
- Family: Buprestidae
- Genus: Mesostigmodera; Etheridge & Olliff, 1890

Genus of beetles

Mesostigmodera is a fossil genus of beetles in the family Buprestidae, containing the following species:

- Mesostigmodera frenguelli Martins-Neto & Gallego, 1999
- Mesostigmodera typica Etheridge & Olliff, 1890
