= Bubastes =

Scientific classification
- Kingdom: Animalia
- Phylum: Arthropoda
- Class: Insecta
- Order: Coleoptera
- Suborder: Polyphaga
- Infraorder: Elateriformia
- Family: Buprestidae
- Genus: Bubastes; Laporte & Gory, 1836

Genus of beetles

Bubastes is a genus of beetles in the family Buprestidae.

== Species ==
Bubastes contains the following species:

- Bubastes achardi Obenberger, 1920
- Bubastes aenea Obenberger, 1922
- Bubastes australasiae Obenberger, 1922
- Bubastes barkeri Bílý & Hanlon, 2020
- Bubastes blackburni Obenberger, 1941
- Bubastes boisduvali Obenberger, 1941
- Bubastes borealis Obenberger, 1928
- Bubastes bostrychoides (Théry, 1910)
- Bubastes carnarvonensis Obenberger, 1941
- Bubastes carteri Obenberger, 1941
- Bubastes chapmani Obenberger, 1941
- Bubastes cylindrica Macleay, 1888
- Bubastes deserta Bílý & Hanlon, 2020
- Bubastes dichroa Bílý & Hanlon, 2020
- Bubastes erbeni Obenberger, 1941
- Bubastes euryspiloides Obenberger, 1922
- Bubastes flavocaerulea Bílý & Hanlon, 2020
- Bubastes formosa Carter, 1915
- Bubastes germari Obenberger, 1928
- Bubastes globicollis Thomson, 1879
- Bubastes hasenpuschi Bílý & Hanlon, 2020
- Bubastes inconsistans Thomson, 1879
- Bubastes iridiventris Bílý & Hanlon, 2020
- Bubastes iris Bílý & Hanlon, 2020
- Bubastes kirbyi Obenberger, 1928
- Bubastes laticollis Blackburn, 1888
- Bubastes leai Carter, 1924
- Bubastes macmillani Bílý & Hanlon, 2020
- Bubastes magnifica Bílý & Hanlon, 2020
- Bubastes michaelpowelli Bílý & Hanlon, 2020
- Bubastes niveiventris Obenberger, 1922
- Bubastes obscura Obenberger, 1922
- Bubastes occidentalis Blackburn, 1891
- Bubastes odewahni Obenberger, 1928
- Bubastes olivina Obenberger, 1920
- Bubastes persplendens Obenberger, 1920
- Bubastes pilbarensis Bílý & Hanlon, 2020
- Bubastes remota Bílý & Hanlon, 2020
- Bubastes saundersi Obenberger, 1928
- Bubastes septentrionalis Obenberger, 1941
- Bubastes simillima Obenberger, 1922
- Bubastes sphaenoida Laporte & Gory, 1836
- Bubastes splendens Blackburn, 1891
- Bubastes strandi Obenberger, 1920
- Bubastes subflavipennis Carter, 1937
- Bubastes subnigricollis Carter, 1939
- Bubastes suturalis Carter, 1915
- Bubastes thomsoni Obenberger, 1928
- Bubastes vagans Blackburn, 1892
- Bubastes vanrooni Obenberger, 1928
- Bubastes viridiaurea Bílý & Hanlon, 2020
- Bubastes viridicuprea Obenberger, 1922
