= Notobubastes =

Scientific classification
- Kingdom: Animalia
- Phylum: Arthropoda
- Class: Insecta
- Order: Coleoptera
- Suborder: Polyphaga
- Infraorder: Elateriformia
- Family: Buprestidae
- Genus: Notobubastes; Carter, 1924

Genus of beetles

Notobubastes is a genus of beetles in the family Buprestidae, containing the following species:

- Notobubastes aurosulcata Carter, 1924
- Notobubastes costata Carter, 1924
- Notobubastes occidentalis Carter, 1924
- Notobubastes orientalis Carter, 1924
