= Trigonogenium =

Scientific classification
- Kingdom: Animalia
- Phylum: Arthropoda
- Class: Insecta
- Order: Coleoptera
- Suborder: Polyphaga
- Infraorder: Elateriformia
- Family: Buprestidae
- Genus: Trigonogenium; Harold, 1869

Genus of beetles

Trigonogenium is a genus of beetles in the family Buprestidae, the jewel beetles. Species are native to Chile and Argentina.

Species include:

- Trigonogenium angulosum (Solier, 1849)
- Trigonogenium biforme Cobos, 1986
- Trigonogenium subaequale (Fairmaire & Germain, 1864)
