= Cimrmanium =

Cimrmanium angulinotum

Scientific classification
- Kingdom: Animalia
- Phylum: Arthropoda
- Class: Insecta
- Order: Coleoptera
- Suborder: Polyphaga
- Infraorder: Elateriformia
- Family: Buprestidae
- Genus: Cimrmanium; Bily, 2009
- Species: C. angulinotum

Binomial name
- Cimrmanium angulinotum Bily, 2009

Genus of beetles

Cimrmanium angulinotum is a species of beetle in the family Buprestidae, the only species in the genus Cimrmanium.
