= Aristosoma =

Aristosoma suturale

Scientific classification
- Kingdom: Animalia
- Phylum: Arthropoda
- Class: Insecta
- Order: Coleoptera
- Suborder: Polyphaga
- Infraorder: Elateriformia
- Family: Buprestidae
- Genus: Aristosoma; Saunders, 1871
- Species: A. suturale

Binomial name
- Aristosoma suturale (Thunberg, 1789)

Genus of beetles

Aristosoma suturale is a species of beetle in the family Buprestidae, the only species in the genus Aristosoma.
