= Brachanthaxia =

Brachanthaxia gemmata

Scientific classification
- Kingdom: Animalia
- Phylum: Arthropoda
- Class: Insecta
- Order: Coleoptera
- Suborder: Polyphaga
- Infraorder: Elateriformia
- Family: Buprestidae
- Genus: Brachanthaxia; Thery, 1930
- Species: B. gemmata

Binomial name
- Brachanthaxia gemmata (Gory & Laporte, 1839)

Genus of beetles

Brachanthaxia gemmata is a species of beetles in the family Buprestidae, the only species in the genus Brachanthaxia.
