= Oaxacanthaxia =

Scientific classification
- Kingdom: Animalia
- Phylum: Arthropoda
- Class: Insecta
- Order: Coleoptera
- Suborder: Polyphaga
- Infraorder: Elateriformia
- Family: Buprestidae
- Genus: Oaxacanthaxia; Bellamy, 1991

Genus of beetles

Oaxacanthaxia is a genus of beetles in the family Buprestidae, containing the following species:

- Oaxacanthaxia aenea Hornburg & Gottwald, 2008
- Oaxacanthaxia bicolorata Bellamy, 2011
- Oaxacanthaxia nigroaenea Nelson & MacRae, 1994
- Oaxacanthaxia vandenberghei Niehuis & Gottwald, 2006
- Oaxacanthaxia viridis Bellamy, 1990
