= Ceylonaxia =

Ceylonaxia humilis

Scientific classification
- Kingdom: Animalia
- Phylum: Arthropoda
- Class: Insecta
- Order: Coleoptera
- Suborder: Polyphaga
- Infraorder: Elateriformia
- Family: Buprestidae
- Genus: Ceylonaxia; Bily, 1993
- Species: C. humilis

Binomial name
- Ceylonaxia humilis (Gory, 1841)

Genus of beetles

Ceylonaxia humilis is a species of beetle in the family Buprestidae, the only species in the genus Ceylonaxia.
