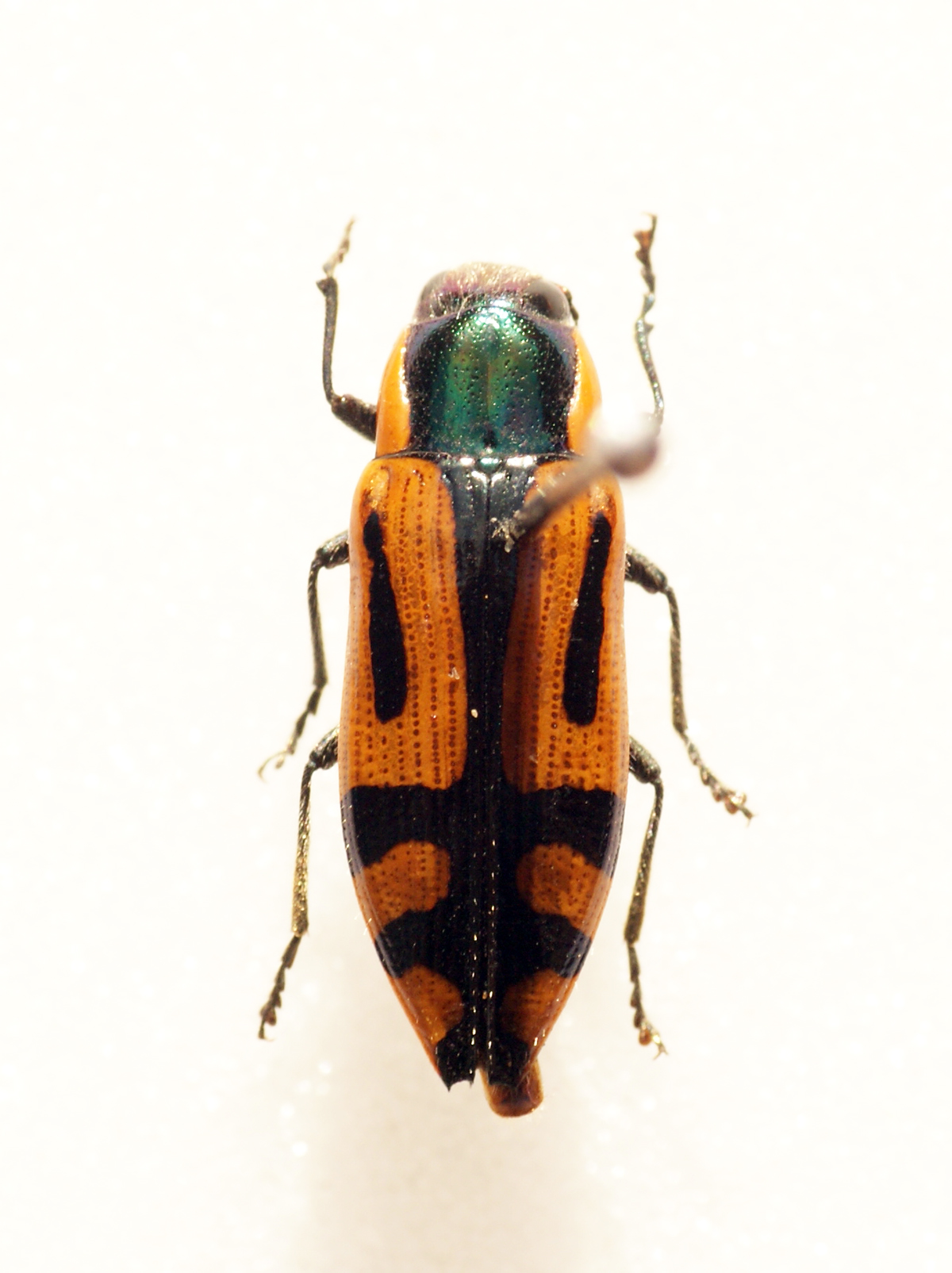

Scientific classification
- Kingdom: Animalia
- Phylum: Arthropoda
- Class: Insecta
- Order: Coleoptera
- Suborder: Polyphaga
- Infraorder: Elateriformia
- Family: Buprestidae
- Genus: Pygicera; Kerremans, 1903
- Species: P. scripta

Binomial name
- Pygicera scripta (Laporte & Gory, 1837)

= Pygicera =

Pygicera scripta

Genus of beetles

Pygicera scripta is a species of beetles in the family Buprestidae, the only species in the genus Pygicera.
