= Paracuris =

Paracuris bimaculata

Scientific classification
- Kingdom: Animalia
- Phylum: Arthropoda
- Class: Insecta
- Order: Coleoptera
- Suborder: Polyphaga
- Infraorder: Elateriformia
- Family: Buprestidae
- Genus: Paracuris; Obenberger, 1923
- Species: P. bimaculata

Binomial name
- Paracuris bimaculata (Gory, 1841)

Genus of beetles

Paracuris bimaculata is a species of beetle in the family Buprestidae, the only species in the genus Paracuris.
