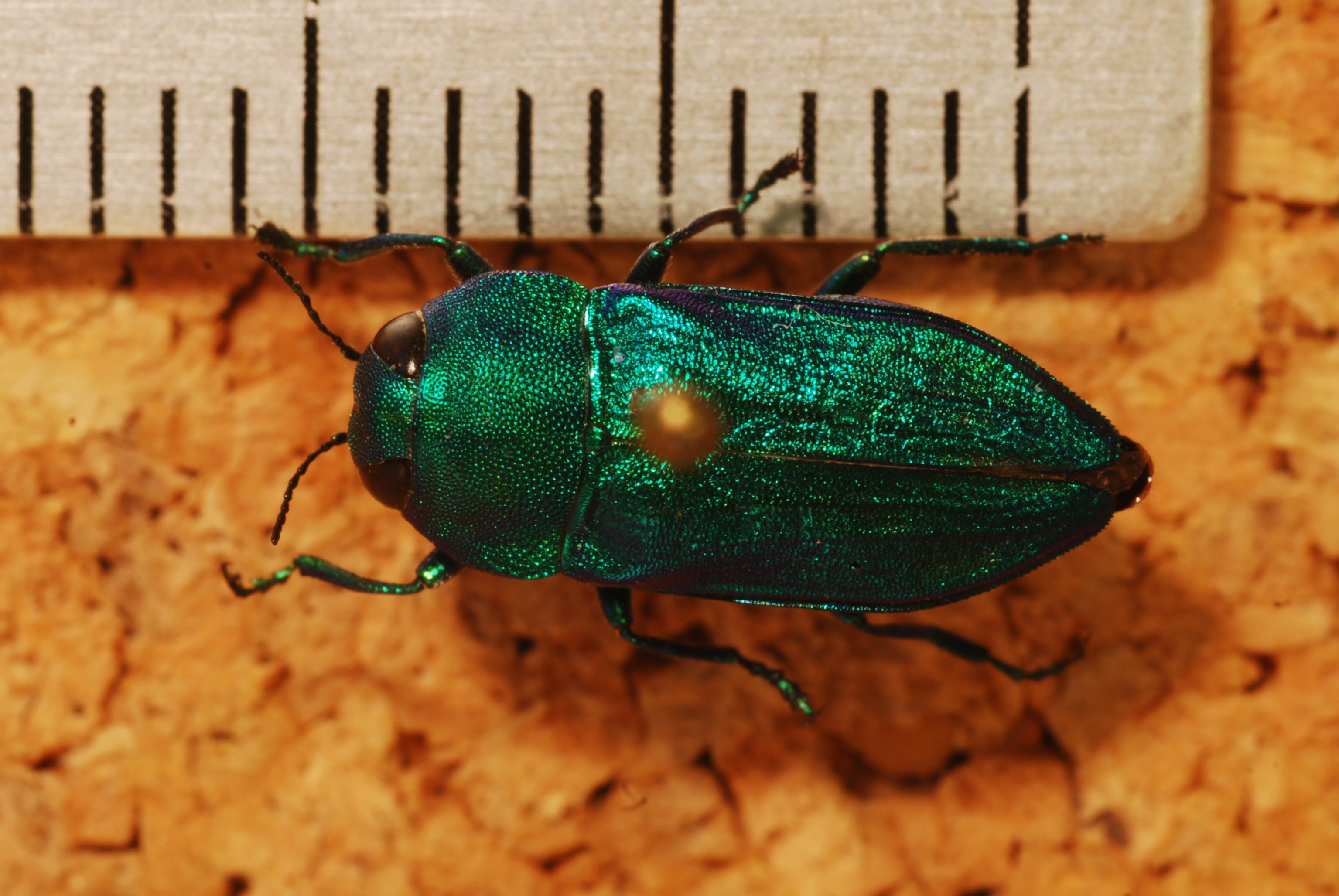
- Jewel Beetle (Ctenoderus oyarcei)

Scientific classification
- Kingdom: Animalia
- Phylum: Arthropoda
- Class: Insecta
- Order: Coleoptera
- Suborder: Polyphaga
- Infraorder: Elateriformia
- Family: Buprestidae
- Genus: Ctenoderus; Germain, 1856

= Ctenoderus =

Genus of beetles

Ctenoderus is a genus of beetles in the family Buprestidae, containing the following species:

- Ctenoderus chloris (Germain, 1856)
- Ctenoderus maulicus (Molina, 1782)
- Ctenoderus oyarcei (Germain & Kerremans, 1906)
