= Australorhipis =

Australorhipis aphanochila

Scientific classification
- Kingdom: Animalia
- Phylum: Arthropoda
- Class: Insecta
- Order: Coleoptera
- Suborder: Polyphaga
- Infraorder: Elateriformia
- Family: Buprestidae
- Genus: Australorhipis; Bellamy, 1986
- Species: A. aphanochila

Binomial name
- Australorhipis aphanochila Bellamy, 1986

Genus of beetles

Australorhipis aphanochila is a species of beetles in the family Buprestidae, the only species in the genus Australorhipis.
