= Balthasarella =

Balthasarella melandryoides

Scientific classification
- Kingdom: Animalia
- Phylum: Arthropoda
- Class: Insecta
- Order: Coleoptera
- Suborder: Polyphaga
- Infraorder: Elateriformia
- Family: Buprestidae
- Genus: Balthasarella; Obenberger, 1958
- Species: B. melandryoides

Binomial name
- Balthasarella melandryoides Obenberger, 1958

Genus of beetles

Balthasarella melandryoides is a species of beetles in the family Buprestidae, the only species in the genus Balthasarella.
