= Glaphyroptera =

Glaphyroptera insignis

Scientific classification
- Kingdom: Animalia
- Phylum: Arthropoda
- Class: Insecta
- Order: Coleoptera
- Suborder: Polyphaga
- Infraorder: Elateriformia
- Family: Buprestidae
- Genus: Glaphyroptera; Heer, 1852
- Species: G. insignis

Binomial name
- Glaphyroptera insignis Handlirsch, 1908

Genus of beetles

Glaphyroptera insignis is a fossil species of beetles in the family Buprestidae, the only species in the genus Glaphyroptera.
