= Jakovleviola =

Scientific classification
- Kingdom: Animalia
- Phylum: Arthropoda
- Class: Insecta
- Order: Coleoptera
- Suborder: Polyphaga
- Infraorder: Elateriformia
- Family: Buprestidae
- Genus: Jakovleviola; Obenberger, 1924

Genus of beetles

Jakovleviola is a genus of beetles in the family Buprestidae, containing the following species:

- Jakovleviola oresibata Obenberger, 1924
- Jakovleviola strandi Obenberger, 1931
