= Andakhudukia =

Andakhudukia ponomarenkoi

Scientific classification
- Kingdom: Animalia
- Phylum: Arthropoda
- Class: Insecta
- Order: Coleoptera
- Suborder: Polyphaga
- Infraorder: Elateriformia
- Family: Buprestidae
- Genus: †Andakhudukia; Alexeev, 2008
- Species: †A. ponomarenkoi

Binomial name
- †Andakhudukia ponomarenkoi Alexeev, 2008

Genus of beetles

Andakhudukia ponomarenkoi is a fossil species of beetle in the family Buprestidae, the only species in the genus Andakhudukia. The fossil was originally found in Mongolia, and the genus is named after the locality where it was found, Anda-Khuduk.
