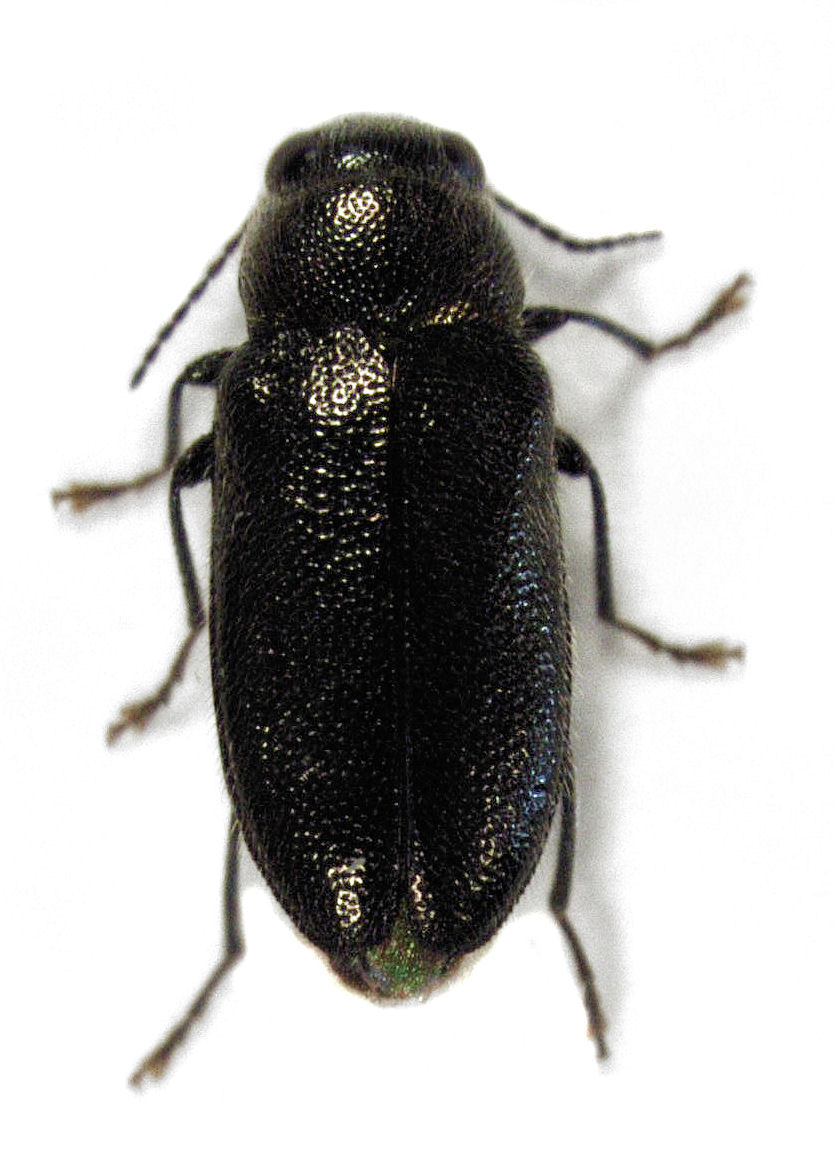
- Maoraxia eremita (White, 1846)

Scientific classification
- Kingdom: Animalia
- Phylum: Arthropoda
- Class: Insecta
- Order: Coleoptera
- Suborder: Polyphaga
- Infraorder: Elateriformia
- Family: Buprestidae
- Genus: Maoraxia; Obenberger, 1937

= Maoraxia =

Genus of beetles

Maoraxia is a genus of beetles in the family Buprestidae, containing the following species:

- Maoraxia auroimpressa (Carter, 1924)
- Maoraxia bourgeoisi Bily, Curletti & Aberlenc, 1985
- Maoraxia cordicollis (Fauvel, 1891)
- Maoraxia eremita (White, 1846)
- Maoraxia excavata (Fauvel, 1891)
- Maoraxia kladavuensis Bellamy, 2008
- Maoraxia purpurea Bellamy, 1990
- Maoraxia roseocuprea Bellamy & Peterson, 2000
- Maoraxia storeyi Williams & Bellamy, 1985
- Maoraxia tokotaai Bellamy, 2008
- Maoraxia tongae Bellamy, 1985
- Maoraxia viridis Bellamy, 1985
- Maoraxia viti Bellamy, 2008
