= Ditriaena =

Scientific classification
- Kingdom: Animalia
- Phylum: Arthropoda
- Class: Insecta
- Order: Coleoptera
- Suborder: Polyphaga
- Infraorder: Elateriformia
- Family: Buprestidae
- Genus: Ditriaena; Waterhouse, 1911

Genus of beetles

Ditriaena is a genus of beetles in the family Buprestidae, containing the following species:

- Ditriaena incerta Cobos, 1975
- Ditriaena purpurascens (Waterhouse, 1882)
- Ditriaena romeroi Hornburg & Gottwald, 2012.
- Ditriaena sexspinosa (Waterhouse, 1889)
- Ditriaena sphericollis (Laporte & Gory, 1836)
