= Exagistus =

Scientific classification
- Kingdom: Animalia
- Phylum: Arthropoda
- Class: Insecta
- Order: Coleoptera
- Suborder: Polyphaga
- Infraorder: Elateriformia
- Family: Buprestidae
- Genus: Exagistus; Deyrolle, 1864

Genus of beetles

Exagistus is a genus of beetles in the family Buprestidae, containing the following species:

- Exagistus atroviridis Fisher, 1930
- Exagistus brunneus Fisher, 1930
- Exagistus embriki Obenberger, 1936
- Exagistus fossicollis Kerremans, 1906
- Exagistus igniceps Deyrolle, 1864
- Exagistus rossi Obenberger, 1936
- Exagistus strandi Obenberger, 1936
