= Neocuris =

Scientific classification
- Kingdom: Animalia
- Phylum: Arthropoda
- Class: Insecta
- Order: Coleoptera
- Suborder: Polyphaga
- Infraorder: Elateriformia
- Family: Buprestidae
- Genus: Neocuris; Saunders, 1868

Genus of beetles

Neocuris is a genus of beetles in the family Buprestidae, containing the following species:

- Neocuris aenescens Carter, 1928
- Neocuris anthaxoides Fairmaire, 1877
- Neocuris asperipennis Fairmaire, 1877
- Neocuris brownii Carter, 1915
- Neocuris carnabyae Barker, 1999
- Neocuris carteri Obenberger, 1923
- Neocuris coerulans Fairmaire, 1877
- Neocuris crassa Obenberger, 1923
- Neocuris cuprilatera Fairmaire, 1877
- Neocuris dichroa Fairmaire, 1877
- Neocuris discoflava Fairmaire, 1877
- Neocuris doddi Carter, 1928
- Neocuris duboulayi Carter, 1937
- Neocuris fairmairei Blackburn, 1887
- Neocuris fortnumi (Hope, 1846)
- Neocuris gracilis Macleay, 1872
- Neocuris guerinii (Hope, 1843)
- Neocuris ignicollis Carter, 1937
- Neocuris monochroma Fairmaire, 1877
- Neocuris nickerli Obenberger, 1923
- Neocuris nitidipennis (Obenberger, 1915)
- Neocuris obscurata Obenberger, 1923
- Neocuris ornata Carter, 1913
- Neocuris pauperata Fairmaire, 1877
- Neocuris pubescens Blackburn, 1887
- Neocuris smaragdifrons Obenberger, 1923
- Neocuris thoracica Fairmaire, 1877
- Neocuris violacea Carter, 1928
- Neocuris viridiaurea Macleay, 1888
- Neocuris viridimicans Fairmaire, 1877
