= Jurabuprestis =

Jurabuprestis karatauensis

Scientific classification
- Kingdom: Animalia
- Phylum: Arthropoda
- Class: Insecta
- Order: Coleoptera
- Suborder: Polyphaga
- Infraorder: Elateriformia
- Family: Buprestidae
- Genus: †Jurabuprestis; Alexeev, 2000
- Species: †J. karatauensis

Binomial name
- †Jurabuprestis karatauensis Alexeev, 2000

Genus of beetles

Jurabuprestis karatauensis is a fossil species of beetles in the family Buprestidae, the only species in the genus Jurabuprestis.
