= Chalcangium =

Chalcangium longipenne

Scientific classification
- Kingdom: Animalia
- Phylum: Arthropoda
- Class: Insecta
- Order: Coleoptera
- Suborder: Polyphaga
- Infraorder: Elateriformia
- Family: Buprestidae
- Genus: Chalcangium; Waterhouse, 1882
- Species: C. longipenne

Binomial name
- Chalcangium longipenne Waterhouse, 1882

Genus of beetles

Chalcangium longipenne is a species of beetle in the family Buprestidae, the only species in the genus Chalcangium.
