= Karenaxia =

Scientific classification
- Kingdom: Animalia
- Phylum: Arthropoda
- Class: Insecta
- Order: Coleoptera
- Suborder: Polyphaga
- Infraorder: Elateriformia
- Family: Buprestidae
- Genus: Karenaxia; Bily, 1993

Genus of beetles

Karenaxia is a genus of beetles in the family Buprestidae, containing the following species:

- Karenaxia horaki Bily, 1993
- Karenaxia nigrocyanea Bily, 1997
- Karenaxia similis Bily, 1999
