= Paractenodes =

Paractenodes rudis

Scientific classification
- Kingdom: Animalia
- Phylum: Arthropoda
- Class: Insecta
- Order: Coleoptera
- Suborder: Polyphaga
- Infraorder: Elateriformia
- Family: Buprestidae
- Genus: Paractenodes; Thery, 1934
- Species: P. rudis

Binomial name
- Paractenodes rudis (Kerremans, 1893)

Genus of beetles

Paractenodes rudis is a species of beetles in the family Buprestidae, the only species in the genus Paractenodes.
