= Hoscheckia =

Scientific classification
- Kingdom: Animalia
- Phylum: Arthropoda
- Class: Insecta
- Order: Coleoptera
- Suborder: Polyphaga
- Infraorder: Elateriformia
- Family: Buprestidae
- Genus: Hoscheckia; Thery, 1925

Genus of beetles

Hoscheckia is a genus of beetles in the family Buprestidae, containing the following species:

- Hoscheckia africana Thery, 1925
- Hoscheckia strandi (Obenberger, 1918)
