= Kzylordyina =

Kzylordyina obscura

Scientific classification
- Kingdom: Animalia
- Phylum: Arthropoda
- Class: Insecta
- Order: Coleoptera
- Suborder: Polyphaga
- Infraorder: Elateriformia
- Family: Buprestidae
- Genus: Kzylordyina; Alexeev, 1995
- Species: K. obscura

Binomial name
- Kzylordyina obscura Alexeev, 1995

Genus of beetles

Kzylordyina obscura is a fossil species of beetles in the family Buprestidae, the only species in the genus Kzylordyina.
