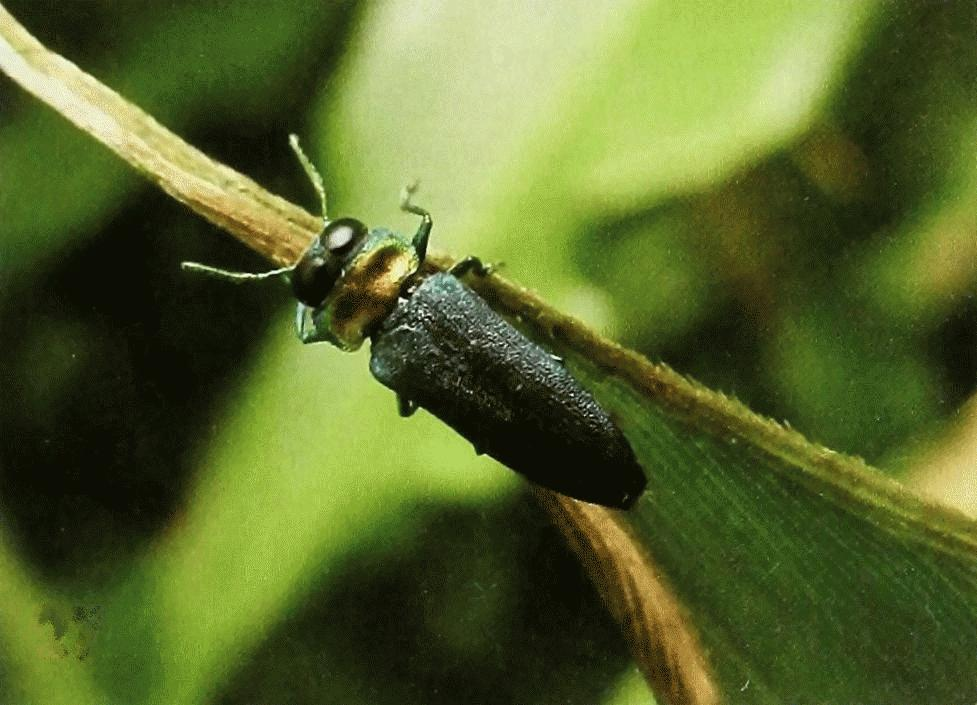

Scientific classification
- Kingdom: Animalia
- Phylum: Arthropoda
- Class: Insecta
- Order: Coleoptera
- Suborder: Polyphaga
- Infraorder: Elateriformia
- Family: Buprestidae
- Genus: Coomaniella; Bourgoin, 1924

= Coomaniella =

Genus of beetles

Coomaniella is a genus of beetles in the family Buprestidae, containing the following species:

- Coomaniella abeillei Obenberger, 1940
- Coomaniella bicolor Jendek & Kalashian, 1999
- Coomaniella biformis Bily & Kalashian, 1994
- Coomaniella biformissima Jendek & Kalashian, 1999
- Coomaniella chinensis Jendek & Kalashian, 1999
- Coomaniella daoensis Jendek & Kalashian, 1999
- Coomaniella isolata Jendek & Kalashian, 1999
- Coomaniella janka Jendek, 2005
- Coomaniella jeanvoinei Thery, 1929
- Coomaniella kubani Bily & Kalashian, 1994
- Coomaniella lao Jendek & Kalashian, 1999
- Coomaniella macropus Thery, 1929
- Coomaniella marguieri Baudon, 1967
- Coomaniella marseuli Obenberger, 1940
- Coomaniella modesta Bourgoin, 1924
- Coomaniella nativa Jendek & Kalashian, 1999
- Coomaniella orlovi Jendek & Kalashian, 1999
- Coomaniella pacholatkoi Jendek & Kalashian, 1999
- Coomaniella prolonga Jendek & Kalashian, 1999
- Coomaniella purpurascens Baudon, 1966
- Coomaniella sausa Jendek & Kalashian, 1999
- Coomaniella siniaevi Jendek & Kalashian, 1999
- Coomaniella taiwanensis Baudon, 1966
- Coomaniella violaceipennis Bourgoin, 1924
