= Kurosawaia =

Scientific classification
- Kingdom: Animalia
- Phylum: Arthropoda
- Class: Insecta
- Order: Coleoptera
- Suborder: Polyphaga
- Infraorder: Elateriformia
- Family: Buprestidae
- Genus: Kurosawaia; Toyama & Ohmomo, 1985

Genus of beetles

Kurosawaia is a genus of beetles in the family Buprestidae, containing the following species:

- Kurosawaia iridinota Bellamy, 1990
- Kurosawaia yanoi (Kurosawa, 1963)
