= Semiognatha =

Semiognatha sainvali

Scientific classification
- Kingdom: Animalia
- Phylum: Arthropoda
- Class: Insecta
- Order: Coleoptera
- Suborder: Polyphaga
- Infraorder: Elateriformia
- Family: Buprestidae
- Genus: Semiognatha; Moore & Lander, 2004
- Species: S. sainvali

Binomial name
- Semiognatha sainvali Moore & Lander, 2004

Genus of beetles

Semiognatha is a monotypic genus of beetles in the family Buprestidae, tribe Stigmoderini, the jewel beetles. The sole species, Semiognatha sainvali, was described in 2004 from a specimen collected in Brazil.
