= Afagrilaxia =

Afagrilaxia natalensis

Scientific classification
- Kingdom: Animalia
- Phylum: Arthropoda
- Class: Insecta
- Order: Coleoptera
- Suborder: Polyphaga
- Infraorder: Elateriformia
- Family: Buprestidae
- Genus: Afagrilaxia; Bily & Bellamy, 1999
- Species: A. natalensis

Binomial name
- Afagrilaxia natalensis Bellamy, 1986

Genus of beetles

Afagrilaxia natalensis is a species of beetle in the family Buprestidae, the only species in the genus Afagrilaxia.
