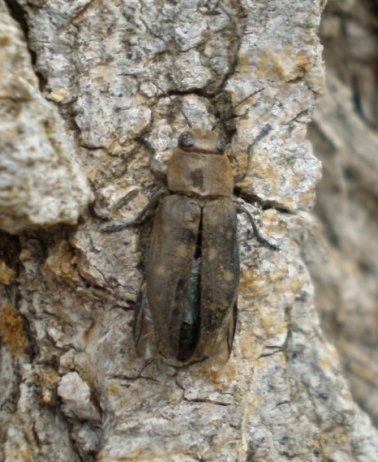
- Trachypteris picta decostigma (Tàrrega, Catalonia)

Scientific classification
- Kingdom: Animalia
- Phylum: Arthropoda
- Class: Insecta
- Order: Coleoptera
- Suborder: Polyphaga
- Infraorder: Elateriformia
- Family: Buprestidae
- Subfamily: Buprestinae
- Genus: Trachypteris; Kirby, 1837
- Species: T. picta

Binomial name
- Trachypteris picta (Pallas, 1773)

= Trachypteris picta =

Genus of beetles

Trachypteris picta is a species of beetles in the family Buprestidae, the only species in the genus Trachypteris.
