= Thomassetia =

Scientific classification
- Kingdom: Animalia
- Phylum: Arthropoda
- Class: Insecta
- Order: Coleoptera
- Suborder: Polyphaga
- Infraorder: Elateriformia
- Family: Buprestidae
- Genus: Thomassetia; Thery, 1928

Genus of beetles

Thomassetia is a genus of beetles in the family Buprestidae, containing the following species:

- Thomassetia anniae (Obenberger, 1928)
- Thomassetia crassa (Waterhouse, 1887)
- Thomassetia natalensis (Thery, 1928)
- Thomassetia parva Bellamy, 1996
- Thomassetia strandi Obenberger, 1936
