= Buprestina =

Buprestina prosternalis

Scientific classification
- Kingdom: Animalia
- Phylum: Arthropoda
- Class: Insecta
- Order: Coleoptera
- Suborder: Polyphaga
- Infraorder: Elateriformia
- Family: Buprestidae
- Genus: Buprestina; Obenberger, 1923
- Species: B. prosternalis

Binomial name
- Buprestina prosternalis Obenberger, 1923

Genus of beetles

Buprestina prosternalis is a species of beetles in the family Buprestidae, the only species in the genus Buprestina.
