= Xenomelanophila =

Xenomelanophila miranda

Scientific classification
- Kingdom: Animalia
- Phylum: Arthropoda
- Class: Insecta
- Order: Coleoptera
- Suborder: Polyphaga
- Infraorder: Elateriformia
- Family: Buprestidae
- Genus: Xenomelanophila; Sloop, 1937
- Species: X. miranda

Binomial name
- Xenomelanophila miranda (LeConte, 1854)

Genus of beetles

Xenomelanophila miranda is a species of beetles in the family Buprestidae, the only species in the genus Xenomelanophila. This beetle only oviposits in smoldering wood, meaning it is only seen during forest fires. They have special infrared sensors on their abdomens to home in on the hot spots.
