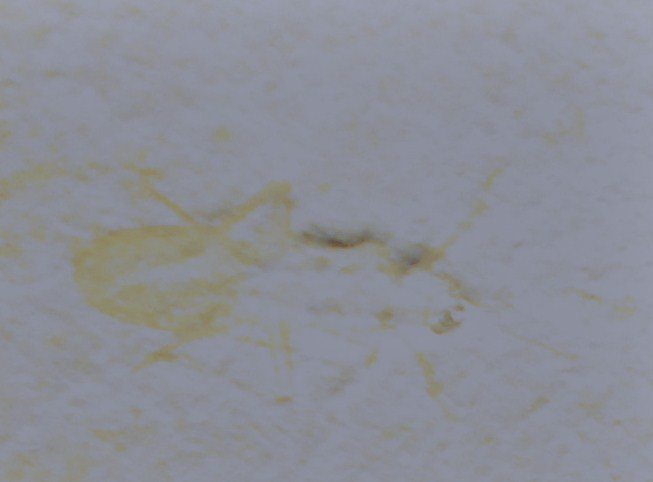

Scientific classification
- Kingdom: Animalia
- Phylum: Arthropoda
- Class: Insecta
- Order: Coleoptera
- Suborder: Polyphaga
- Infraorder: Elateriformia
- Family: Buprestidae
- Genus: †Buprestites; Heer, 1847

= Buprestites =

Genus of beetles

Buprestites is a fossil genus of beetles in the family Buprestidae, containing the following species:

- Buprestites agriloides Heer, 1862
- Buprestites alutacea (Germar, 1837)
- Buprestites carbonum (Germar, 1837)
- Buprestites debilis Heer, 1860
- Buprestites exstinctus Heer, 1847
- Buprestites falconeri Heer, 1862
- Buprestites heeri Scudder, 1900
- Buprestites major (Germar, 1837)
- Buprestites minnae Giebel, 1856
- Buprestites oeningensis Heer, 1847
- Buprestites purbecensis Cockerell, 1920
- Buprestites viridis Meunier, 1898
- Buprestites xylographica (Germar, 1849)
