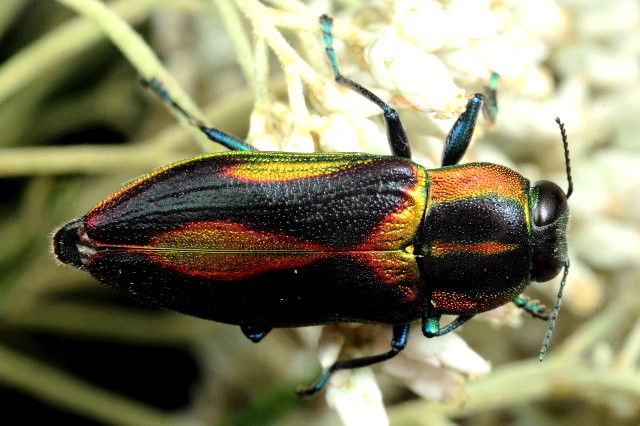
- Selagis caloptera

Scientific classification
- Kingdom: Animalia
- Phylum: Arthropoda
- Class: Insecta
- Order: Coleoptera
- Suborder: Polyphaga
- Infraorder: Elateriformia
- Family: Buprestidae
- Genus: Selagis; Dejean, 1836

Synonyms
- Selagis Dejean, 1833 (Unav.); Curis Gory & Laporte, 1838

= Selagis =

Genus of beetles

Selagis is a genus of beetles in the family Buprestidae.

== Species ==
- Selagis adamsi (Deuquet, 1959)
- Selagis atrocyanea (Carter, 1932)
- Selagis aurifera (Gory & Laporte, 1838)
- Selagis baumi (Obenberger, 1956)
- Selagis caloptera (Boisduval, 1835)
- Selagis carteri (Obenberger, 1956)
- Selagis chloriantha (Fairmaire, 1877)
- Selagis commixta (Obenberger, 1930)
- Selagis confusa (Obenberger, 1832)
- Selagis corusca (Waterhouse, 1882)
- Selagis despecta (Fairmaire, 1877)
- Selagis discoidalis (Blackburn, 1892)
- Selagis hopei (Obenberger, 1956)
- Selagis intercribrata (Fairmaire, 1877)
- Selagis obscura (Carter, 1924)
- Selagis olivacea (Carter, 1913)
- Selagis peroni (Fairmaire, 1877)
- Selagis regia (Carter, 1928)
- Selagis spencei (Mannerheim, 1837)
- Selagis splendens (Macleay, 1872)
- Selagis venusta (Carter, 1937)
- Selagis viridicyanea (Fairmaire, 1877)
- Selagis yalgoensis (Carter, 1924)
- Selagis zecki (Deuquet, 1959)
