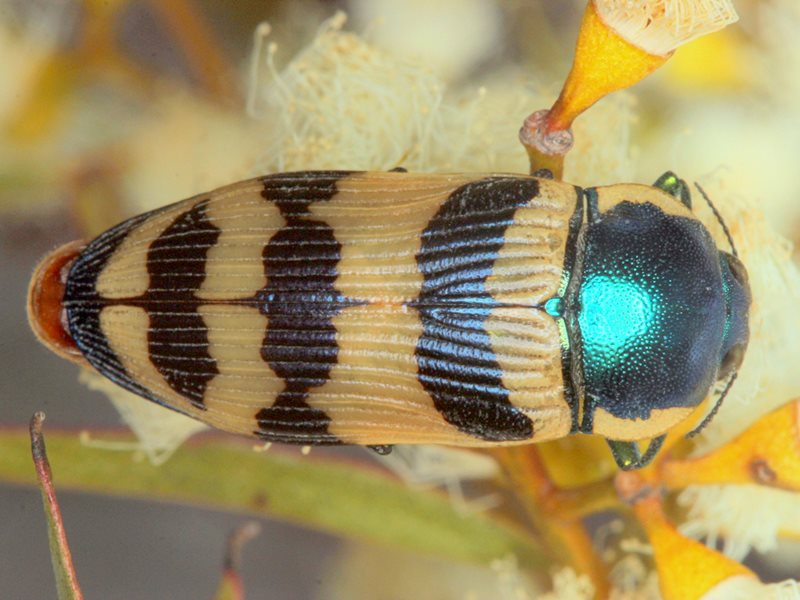
- Calotemognatha yarelli

Scientific classification
- Kingdom: Animalia
- Phylum: Arthropoda
- Class: Insecta
- Order: Coleoptera
- Suborder: Polyphaga
- Infraorder: Elateriformia
- Family: Buprestidae
- Genus: Calotemognatha; Peterson, 1991

= Calotemognatha =

Genus of beetles

Calotemognatha is a genus of beetles in the family Buprestidae, containing the following species:

- Calotemognatha laevicollis (Saunders, 1868)
- Calotemognatha varicollis (Carter, 1913)
- Calotemognatha yarelli (Gory & Laporte, 1838)
