= Theryaxia =

Theryaxia suttoni

Scientific classification
- Kingdom: Animalia
- Phylum: Arthropoda
- Class: Insecta
- Order: Coleoptera
- Suborder: Polyphaga
- Infraorder: Elateriformia
- Family: Buprestidae
- Genus: Theryaxia; Carter, 1928
- Species: T. suttoni

Binomial name
- Theryaxia suttoni Carter, 1928

Genus of beetles

Theryaxia is a monotypic genus of beetles in the family Buprestidae, the jewel beetles. The single species is Theryaxia suttoni. It is endemic to Australia, where it occurs in New South Wales and Queensland.

The larvae of this species are found on white cypress-pine (Callitris columellaris syn. Callitris glaucophylla).
