= Illolampra =

Scientific classification
- Kingdom: Animalia
- Phylum: Arthropoda
- Class: Insecta
- Order: Coleoptera
- Suborder: Polyphaga
- Infraorder: Elateriformia
- Family: Buprestidae
- Genus: Illolampra; Zhang, Sun & Zhang, 1994

Genus of beetles

Illolampra is a genus of beetles in the family Buprestidae, containing the following species:

- Illolampra ampulla Zhang, Sun & Zhang, 1994
- Illolampra phlegma Zhang, Sun & Zhang, 1994
