= Romanophora =

Romanophora verecunda

Scientific classification
- Kingdom: Animalia
- Phylum: Arthropoda
- Class: Insecta
- Order: Coleoptera
- Suborder: Polyphaga
- Infraorder: Elateriformia
- Family: Buprestidae
- Genus: Romanophora; Bily, 2004
- Species: R. verecunda

Binomial name
- Romanophora verecunda (Erichson, 1834)

Genus of beetles

Romanophora verecunda is a species of beetles in the family Buprestidae, the only species in the genus Romanophora.
