= Pterobothris =

Scientific classification
- Kingdom: Animalia
- Phylum: Arthropoda
- Class: Insecta
- Order: Coleoptera
- Suborder: Polyphaga
- Infraorder: Elateriformia
- Family: Buprestidae
- Genus: Pterobothris; Fairmaire & Germain, 1858

Genus of beetles

Pterobothris is a genus of beetles in the family Buprestidae, containing the following species:

- Pterobothris barrigae Moore, 2006
- Pterobothris corrosus Fairmaire & Germain, 1858
