= Phrixia =

Scientific classification
- Kingdom: Animalia
- Phylum: Arthropoda
- Class: Insecta
- Order: Coleoptera
- Suborder: Polyphaga
- Infraorder: Elateriformia
- Family: Buprestidae
- Genus: Phrixia; Deyrolle, 1864

Genus of beetles

Phrixia is a genus of beetles in the family Buprestidae, containing the following species:

- Phrixia albomaculata Fisher, 1922
- Phrixia auricollis (Laporte & Gory, 1837)
- Phrixia cuprina Kerremans, 1909
- Phrixia filiformis Deyrolle, 1864
- Phrixia fossulata Kerremans, 1909
- Phrixia gratiosa Obenberger, 1940
- Phrixia luzonica Bellamy, 1991
- Phrixia opulenta Fisher, 1930
- Phrixia violacea Thery, 1926
- Phrixia vittaticollis Waterhouse, 1887
