= Senegalisia =

Senegalisia semireticulata

Scientific classification
- Kingdom: Animalia
- Phylum: Arthropoda
- Class: Insecta
- Order: Coleoptera
- Suborder: Polyphaga
- Infraorder: Elateriformia
- Family: Buprestidae
- Genus: Senegalisia; Bellamy, 1987
- Species: S. semireticulata

Binomial name
- Senegalisia semireticulata (Chevrolat, 1838)

Genus of beetles

Senegalisia is a monotypic genus of beetles in the family Buprestidae, the jewel beetles. It was erected in 1987 for a species separated from the genus Anthaxia and renamed Senegalisia semireticulata. It is native to Senegal.
