= Mesolobites =

Mesolobites Temporal range: Norian–Toarcian

Scientific classification
- Domain: Eukaryota
- Kingdom: Animalia
- Phylum: Arthropoda
- Class: Insecta
- Order: Coleoptera
- Family: †Schizocoleidae
- Genus: †Mesolobites; Carpenter, 1986

Synonyms
- Lobites Dunstan, 1923

Extinct genus of beetles

Mesolobites is a form genus of fossils of isolated beetle elytra from the Mesozoic of Australia and China, placed in the form family Schizocoleidae. The genus was first established in 1923 by Australian geologist Benjamin Dunstan under the name Lobites, derived from lobos ("pod"), for three Late Triassic fossils from Queensland that were doubtfully assigned to the family Buprestidae. It was renamed to Mesolobites by Frank M. Carpenter in 1986, the name Lobites being already used for a genus of Ceratitida, Lobites Mojsisovics, 1873.

== Species ==
The genus contains the following species:

- Mesolobites granulatus (Dunstan, 1923) – Blackstone Formation, Queensland, Australia, Late Triassic (Norian)
- Mesolobites margacrispus (Lin & Mou, 1989) (= Shijingocoleus margacrispus) – Xiaoping Formation, China, Late Triassic (Rhaetian)
- Mesolobites punctatoides (Lin, 1986) (= "Polysitum" punctatoides) – Sanqiutang Formation, China, Late Triassic (Rhaetian)
- Mesolobites quadripartita (Dunstan, 1923) (= "Mesothoris" quadripartita) – Blackstone Formation, Queensland, Australia, Late Triassic (Norian)
- Mesolobites tenuiclathrata (Dunstan, 1923) (= "Mesothoris" tenuiclathrata) – Blackstone Formation, Queensland, Australia, Late Triassic (Norian)
- Mesolobites trivittatus (Dunstan, 1923) – Blackstone Formation, Queensland, Australia, Late Triassic (Norian)
- Mesolobites tuberculatus (Dunstan, 1923) – Blackstone Formation, Queensland, Australia, Late Triassic (Norian)
