= Torresita =

Scientific classification
- Kingdom: Animalia
- Phylum: Arthropoda
- Class: Insecta
- Order: Coleoptera
- Suborder: Polyphaga
- Infraorder: Elateriformia
- Family: Buprestidae
- Genus: Torresita; Gemminger & Harold, 1869

Genus of beetles

Torresita is a genus of beetles in the family Buprestidae, the jewel beetles. The two species in the genus are native to Australia.

Species include:

- Torresita cuprifera (Kirby, 1818)
- Torresita parallela Kerremans, 1898
