= Anthaxioides =

Anthaxioides aurorus

Scientific classification
- Kingdom: Animalia
- Phylum: Arthropoda
- Class: Insecta
- Order: Coleoptera
- Suborder: Polyphaga
- Infraorder: Elateriformia
- Family: Buprestidae
- Genus: Anthaxioides; Cobos, 1978
- Species: A. aurorus

Binomial name
- Anthaxioides aurorus (Philippi & Philippi, 1860)

Genus of beetles

Anthaxioides aurorus is a species of beetles in the family Buprestidae, the only species in the genus Anthaxioides.
