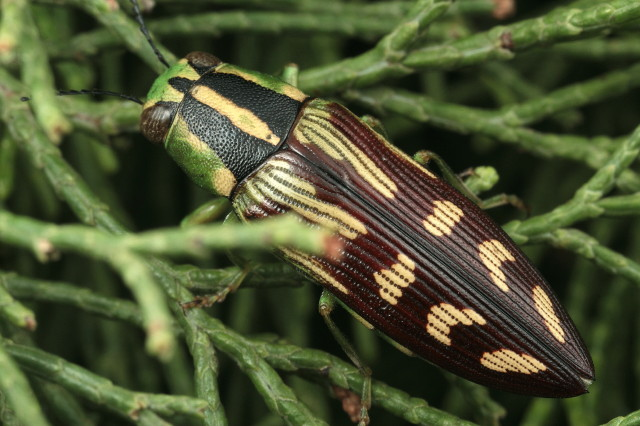
- Diadoxus regius

Scientific classification
- Kingdom: Animalia
- Phylum: Arthropoda
- Class: Insecta
- Order: Coleoptera
- Suborder: Polyphaga
- Infraorder: Elateriformia
- Family: Buprestidae
- Genus: Diadoxus; Saunders, 1868

= Diadoxus =

Genus of beetles

Diadoxus is a genus of beetles in the family Buprestidae, containing the following species:

- Diadoxus erythrurus (White, 1846)
- Diadoxus juengi Blackburn, 1899
- Diadoxus regius Peterson, 1991
