= Notographus =

Scientific classification
- Kingdom: Animalia
- Phylum: Arthropoda
- Class: Insecta
- Order: Coleoptera
- Suborder: Polyphaga
- Infraorder: Elateriformia
- Family: Buprestidae
- Genus: Notographus; Thomson, 1879

Genus of beetles

Notographus is a genus of beetles in the family Buprestidae, containing the following species:

- Notographus hieroglyphicus (Macleay, 1872)
- Notographus sulcipennis (Macleay, 1872)
- Notographus uniformis (Macleay, 1888)
- Notographus yorkensis Obenberger, 1922
