= Mendizabalia =

Scientific classification
- Kingdom: Animalia
- Phylum: Arthropoda
- Class: Insecta
- Order: Coleoptera
- Suborder: Polyphaga
- Infraorder: Elateriformia
- Family: Buprestidae
- Genus: Mendizabalia; Cobos, 1957

Genus of beetles

Mendizabalia is a genus of beetles in the family Buprestidae, containing the following species:

- Mendizabalia germaini (Germain & Kerremans, 1906)
- Mendizabalia penai Bellamy & Moore, 1991
