= Micranthaxia =

Micranthaxia rediviva

Scientific classification
- Kingdom: Animalia
- Phylum: Arthropoda
- Class: Insecta
- Order: Coleoptera
- Suborder: Polyphaga
- Infraorder: Elateriformia
- Family: Buprestidae
- Genus: Micranthaxia; Heer, 1865
- Species: M. rediviva

Binomial name
- Micranthaxia rediviva Heer, 1865

Genus of beetles

Micranthaxia rediviva is a fossil species of beetle in the family Buprestidae, the only species in the genus Micranthaxia.
