= Pseudanilara =

Scientific classification
- Kingdom: Animalia
- Phylum: Arthropoda
- Class: Insecta
- Order: Coleoptera
- Suborder: Polyphaga
- Infraorder: Elateriformia
- Family: Buprestidae
- Genus: Pseudanilara; Thery, 1910

Genus of beetles

Pseudanilara is a genus of beetles in the family Buprestidae, containing the following species:

- Pseudanilara achardi (Obenberger, 1923)
- Pseudanilara bicolor Carter, 1924
- Pseudanilara cupripes (Macleay, 1872)
- Pseudanilara dubia Carter, 1926
- Pseudanilara kerremansi (Obenberger, 1928)
- Pseudanilara microphaenops (Obenberger, 1928)
- Pseudanilara occidentalis Carter, 1924
- Pseudanilara occidentris (Obenberger, 1924)
- Pseudanilara piliventris Carter, 1926
- Pseudanilara pilosa (Carter, 1913)
- Pseudanilara purpureicollis (Macleay, 1872)
