= Panapulla =

Panapulla strongyliformis

Scientific classification
- Kingdom: Animalia
- Phylum: Arthropoda
- Class: Insecta
- Order: Coleoptera
- Suborder: Polyphaga
- Infraorder: Elateriformia
- Family: Buprestidae
- Genus: Panapulla; Nelson, 2000
- Species: P. strongyliformis

Binomial name
- Panapulla strongyliformis Nelson, 2000

Genus of beetles

Panapulla strongyliformis is a species of beetles in the family Buprestidae, the only species in the genus Panapulla.
