= Philanthaxoides =

Philanthaxoides gallicus

Scientific classification
- Kingdom: Animalia
- Phylum: Arthropoda
- Class: Insecta
- Order: Coleoptera
- Suborder: Polyphaga
- Infraorder: Elateriformia
- Family: Buprestidae
- Genus: Philanthaxoides; Bílý & Kirejtschuk, 2007
- Species: P. gallicus

Binomial name
- Philanthaxoides gallicus Bílý & Kirejtschuk, 2007

Genus of beetles

Philanthaxoides gallicus is a fossil species of beetles in the family Buprestidae, the only species in the genus Philanthaxoides.
