= Philandia =

Scientific classification
- Kingdom: Animalia
- Phylum: Arthropoda
- Class: Insecta
- Order: Coleoptera
- Suborder: Polyphaga
- Infraorder: Elateriformia
- Family: Buprestidae
- Genus: Philandia; Germain & Kerremans, 1906

Genus of beetles

Philandia is a genus of beetles in the family Buprestidae, containing the following species:

- Philandia araucana Germain & Kerremans, 1906
- Philandia valdiviana (Philippi & Philippi, 1860)
