= Hovorigenium =

Hovorigenium ecuadorense

Scientific classification
- Kingdom: Animalia
- Phylum: Arthropoda
- Class: Insecta
- Order: Coleoptera
- Suborder: Polyphaga
- Infraorder: Elateriformia
- Family: Buprestidae
- Genus: Hovorigenium; Bellamy, 2007
- Species: H. ecuadorense

Binomial name
- Hovorigenium ecuadorense Bellamy, 2007

Genus of beetles

Hovorigenium ecuadorense is a species of beetle in the family Buprestidae, the only species in the genus Hovorigenium.
