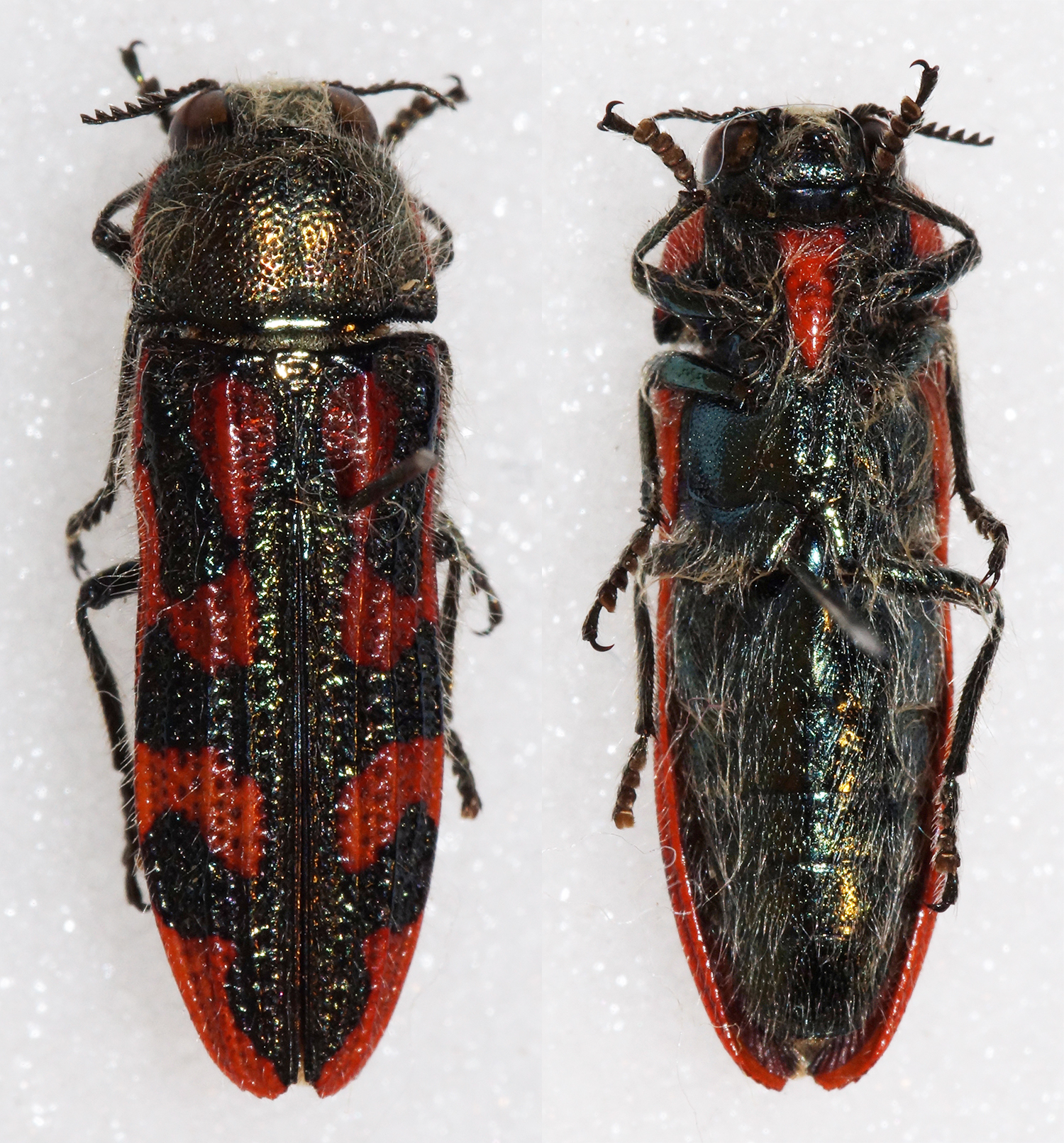
- Lasionota cupricollis

Scientific classification
- Kingdom: Animalia
- Phylum: Arthropoda
- Class: Insecta
- Order: Coleoptera
- Suborder: Polyphaga
- Infraorder: Elateriformia
- Family: Buprestidae
- Tribe: Stigmoderini
- Genus: Lasionota; Mannerheim, 1837

= Lasionota =

Genus of beetles

Lasionota is a genus of beetles in the family Buprestidae, containing the following species:

- Lasionota acutipennis (Moore, 1997)
- Lasionota apicalis (Kerremans, 1903)
- Lasionota atrocyaneo (Moore, 1997)
- Lasionota bachmanni (Moore, 1997)
- Lasionota bernardi (Théry, 1911)
- Lasionota bifasciatus (Moore, 1986)
- Lasionota bivittatus (Gory & Laporte, 1839)
- Lasionota bonaerensis (Moore, 1997)
- Lasionota bruchi (Kerremans, 1903)
- Lasionota brullei (Gory & Laporte, 1839)
- Lasionota catamarcalis (Moore, 1997)
- Lasionota cobosi (Moore, 1997)
- Lasionota coerulans (Obenberger, 1922)
- Lasionota conjunctus (Chevrolat, 1838)
- Lasionota cupricollis (Gory & Laporte, 1839)
- Lasionota dispar (Kerremans, 1903)
- Lasionota espanoli (Cobos, 1958)
- Lasionota fairmairei (Kerremans, 1897)
- Lasionota javierae (Moore, 1987)
- Lasionota leyboldi (Steinheil, 1874)
- Lasionota millenium (Moore, 2000)
- Lasionota minor (Solier, 1849)
- Lasionota morosus (Gory & Laporte, 1839)
- Lasionota okea (Gory, 1841)
- Lasionota parallelus (Cobos, 1958)
- Lasionota pictus (Gory & Laporte, 1839)
- Lasionota platensis (Moore, 1997)
- Lasionota politus (Moore, 1997)
- Lasionota quadrifasciatus Mannerheim, 1837
- Lasionota quadrizonatus Blanchard, 1846
- Lasionota robustus (Cobos, 1959)
- Lasionota rouletii (Solier, 1849)
- Lasionota rousselii (Solier, 1849)
- Lasionota rubidipennis (Pochon, 1971)
- Lasionota rufocaudalis (Moore, 1986)
- Lasionota rugicollis (Moore, 1997)
- Lasionota spitzi (Théry, 1936)
- Lasionota sulcatus (Moore, 1997)
- Lasionota tetrazonus (Chevrolat, 1838)
- Lasionota tucumanus (Théry, 1911)
- Lasionota vigintiguttatus (Perty, 1830)
