= Stephansortia =

Scientific classification
- Kingdom: Animalia
- Phylum: Arthropoda
- Class: Insecta
- Order: Coleoptera
- Suborder: Polyphaga
- Infraorder: Elateriformia
- Family: Buprestidae
- Genus: Stephansortia; Thery, 1925

Genus of beetles

Stephansortia is a genus of beetles in the family Buprestidae, containing the following species:

- Stephansortia cyanipennis Thery, 1925
- Stephansortia torreana Levey, 1992
