= Paraphrixia =

Paraphrixia purpurea

Scientific classification
- Kingdom: Animalia
- Phylum: Arthropoda
- Class: Insecta
- Order: Coleoptera
- Suborder: Polyphaga
- Infraorder: Elateriformia
- Family: Buprestidae
- Genus: Paraphrixia; Saunders, 1871
- Species: P. purpurea

Binomial name
- Paraphrixia purpurea (Olivier, 1790)

Genus of beetles

Paraphrixia purpurea is a species of beetles in the family Buprestidae, the only species in the genus Paraphrixia.
