= Hilarotes =

Scientific classification
- Kingdom: Animalia
- Phylum: Arthropoda
- Class: Insecta
- Order: Coleoptera
- Suborder: Polyphaga
- Infraorder: Elateriformia
- Family: Buprestidae
- Genus: Hilarotes; Saunders, 1871

Genus of beetles

Hilarotes is a genus of beetles in the family Buprestidae, containing the following species:

- Hilarotes chalcoptera (Jacquelin du Val, 1857)
- Hilarotes mannerheimii (Mannerheim, 1837)
- Hilarotes nitidicollis (Laporte & Gory, 1837)
