= Brevista =

Brevista zherichini

Scientific classification
- Kingdom: Animalia
- Phylum: Arthropoda
- Class: Insecta
- Order: Coleoptera
- Suborder: Polyphaga
- Infraorder: Elateriformia
- Family: Buprestidae
- Genus: Brevista; Alexeev, 1995
- Species: B. zherichini

Binomial name
- Brevista zherichini Alexeev, 1995

Genus of beetles

Brevista zherichini is a fossil species of beetles in the family Buprestidae, the only species in the genus Brevista.
