= Microcastalia =

Scientific classification
- Domain: Eukaryota
- Kingdom: Animalia
- Phylum: Arthropoda
- Class: Insecta
- Order: Coleoptera
- Suborder: Polyphaga
- Infraorder: Elateriformia
- Family: Buprestidae
- Genus: Microcastalia

Genus of beetles

Microcastalia is a genus of metallic wood-boring beetles in the family Buprestidae. There are at least two described species in Microcastalia.

== Species ==
These two species belong to the genus Microcastalia.

- Microcastalia globithorax (Thomson, 1878)
- Microcastalia scintillans (Carter, 1924)
