= Barakula =

Barakula petersonorum

Scientific classification
- Kingdom: Animalia
- Phylum: Arthropoda
- Class: Insecta
- Order: Coleoptera
- Suborder: Polyphaga
- Infraorder: Elateriformia
- Family: Buprestidae
- Genus: Barakula; Peterson & Bellamy, 2000
- Species: B. petersonorum

Binomial name
- Barakula petersonorum Peterson, 2000

Genus of beetles

Barakula petersonorum is a species of beetles in the family Buprestidae, the only species in the genus Barakula.
