= Eolampra =

Eolampra gorgia

Scientific classification
- Kingdom: Animalia
- Phylum: Arthropoda
- Class: Insecta
- Order: Coleoptera
- Suborder: Polyphaga
- Infraorder: Elateriformia
- Family: Buprestidae
- Genus: Eolampra; Zhang, Sun & Zhang, 1994
- Species: E. gorgia

Binomial name
- Eolampra gorgia Zhang, Sun & Zhang, 1994

Genus of beetles

Eolampra gorgia is a fossil species of beetles in the family Buprestidae, the only species in the genus Eolampra.

Its average body measurement is 31.4 x 11.4 and age range is 15.97 to 11.608 Ma.
