= Embrikiola =

Embrikiola simulans

Scientific classification
- Kingdom: Animalia
- Phylum: Arthropoda
- Class: Insecta
- Order: Coleoptera
- Suborder: Polyphaga
- Infraorder: Elateriformia
- Family: Buprestidae
- Genus: Embrikiola; Obenberger, 1928
- Species: E. simulans

Binomial name
- Embrikiola simulans (Obenberger, 1922)

Genus of beetles

Embrikiola simulans is a species of beetles in the family Buprestidae, the only species in the genus Embrikiola.
