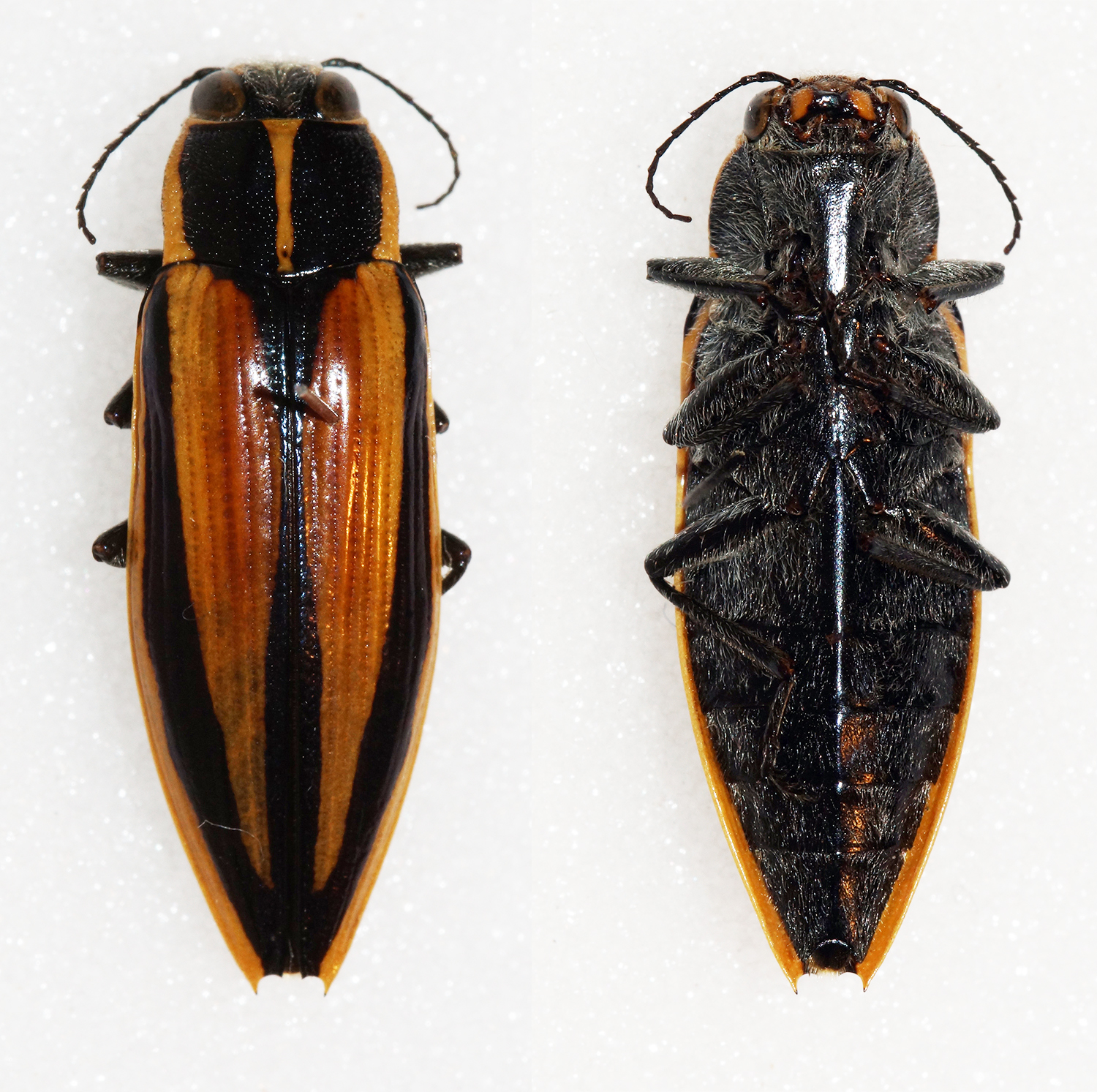

Scientific classification
- Kingdom: Animalia
- Phylum: Arthropoda
- Class: Insecta
- Order: Coleoptera
- Suborder: Polyphaga
- Infraorder: Elateriformia
- Family: Buprestidae
- Genus: Epistomentis; Solier, 1849
- Species: E. pictus

Binomial name
- Epistomentis pictus (Gory, 1841)

= Epistomentis =

Epistomentis pictus

Genus of beetles

Epistomentis pictus is a species of beetles in the family Buprestidae, the only species in the genus Epistomentis.
