= Madessetia =

Scientific classification
- Kingdom: Animalia
- Phylum: Arthropoda
- Class: Insecta
- Order: Coleoptera
- Suborder: Polyphaga
- Infraorder: Elateriformia
- Family: Buprestidae
- Genus: Madessetia; Bellamy, 2006

Genus of beetles

Madessetia is a genus of beetles in the family Buprestidae, containing the following species:

- Madessetia bicolor Bellamy, 2006
- Madessetia unicolor Bellamy, 2006
