= Neobubastes =

Scientific classification
- Kingdom: Animalia
- Phylum: Arthropoda
- Class: Insecta
- Order: Coleoptera
- Suborder: Polyphaga
- Infraorder: Elateriformia
- Family: Buprestidae
- Genus: Neobubastes; Blackburn, 1892

Genus of beetles

Neobubastes is a genus of beetles in the family Buprestidae, containing the following species:

- Neobubastes aureocincta Blackburn, 1892
- Neobubastes flavivittata Carter, 1922
- Neobubastes nickerli (Obenberger, 1928)
