= Pseudhyperantha =

Scientific classification
- Kingdom: Animalia
- Phylum: Arthropoda
- Class: Insecta
- Order: Coleoptera
- Suborder: Polyphaga
- Infraorder: Elateriformia
- Family: Buprestidae
- Genus: Pseudhyperantha; Saunders, 1869

Genus of beetles

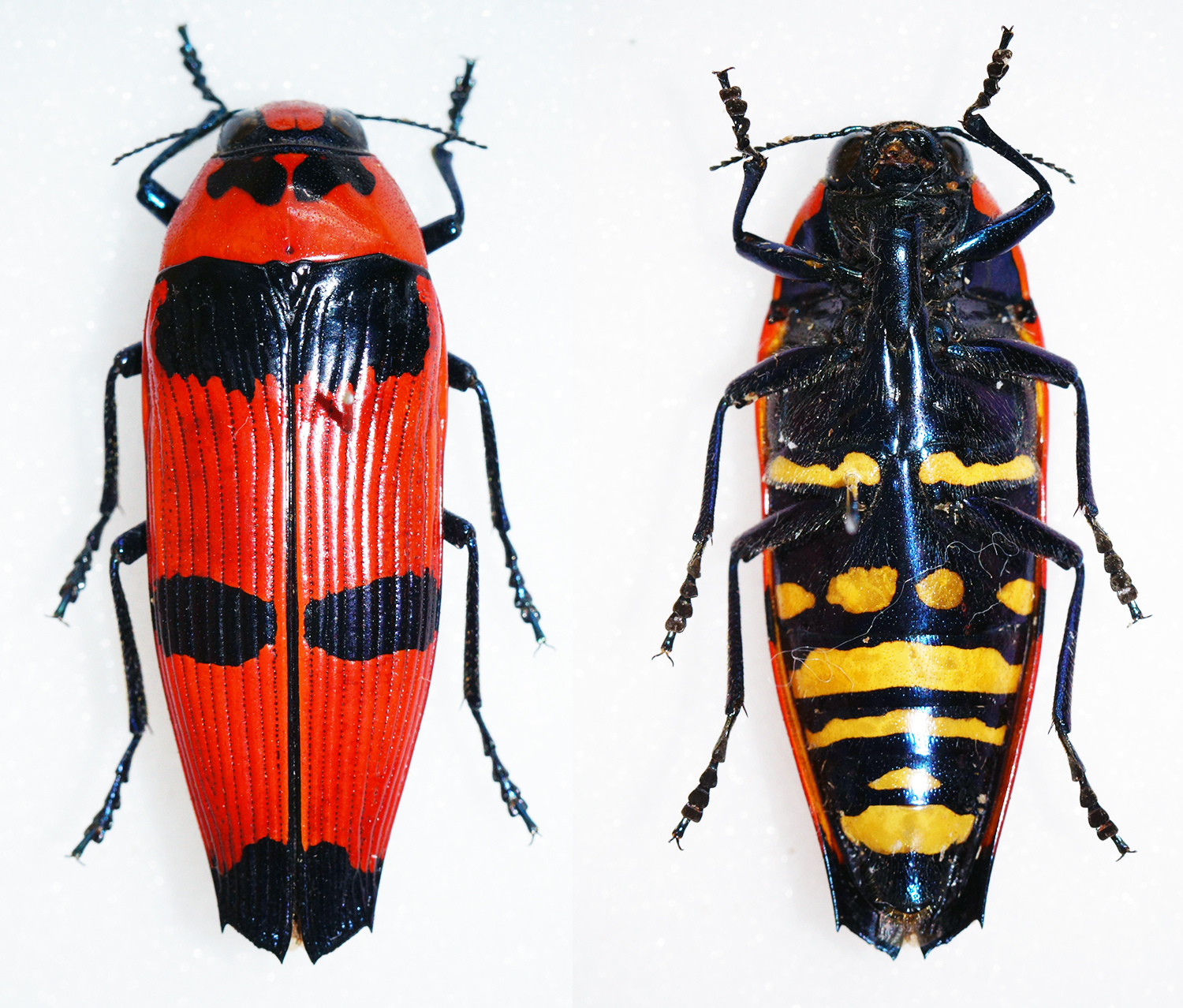
Thery, 1935 Sex: Female Data: 06-2016 - Mount Dempo - Sumatra

Pseudhyperantha is a genus of beetles in the family Buprestidae, containing the following species:

- Pseudhyperantha bloetei Thery, 1935
- Pseudhyperantha jucunda Saunders, 1869
- Pseudhyperantha pinratanai Hattori, 1997
- Pseudhyperantha trifasciata Toyama, 1989
