= Aglaostola =

Aglaostola tereticollis

Scientific classification
- Kingdom: Animalia
- Phylum: Arthropoda
- Class: Insecta
- Order: Coleoptera
- Suborder: Polyphaga
- Infraorder: Elateriformia
- Family: Buprestidae
- Genus: Aglaostola; Saunders, 1871
- Species: A. tereticollis

Binomial name
- Aglaostola tereticollis (Pallas, 1782)

Genus of beetles

Aglaostola tereticollis is a species of beetles in the family Buprestidae, the only species in the genus Aglaostola.
