= Anthaxoschema =

Scientific classification
- Kingdom: Animalia
- Phylum: Arthropoda
- Class: Insecta
- Order: Coleoptera
- Suborder: Polyphaga
- Infraorder: Elateriformia
- Family: Buprestidae
- Genus: Anthaxoschema; Obenberger, 1923

Genus of beetles

Anthaxoschema is a genus of beetles in the family Buprestidae, containing the following species:

- Anthaxoschema carteri Thery, 1945
- Anthaxoschema terraereginae Obenberger, 1923
