= Pseudothyrea =

Pseudothyrea oppenheimi

Scientific classification
- Kingdom: Animalia
- Phylum: Arthropoda
- Class: Insecta
- Order: Coleoptera
- Suborder: Polyphaga
- Infraorder: Elateriformia
- Family: Buprestidae
- Genus: Pseudothyrea; Handlirsch, 1908
- Species: P. oppenheimi

Binomial name
- Pseudothyrea oppenheimi Handlirsch, 1908

Genus of beetles

Pseudothyrea oppenheimi is a fossil species of beetles in the family Buprestidae, the only species in the genus Pseudothyrea.
