= Paleobuprestis =

Paleobuprestis Temporal range: Visean–Late Cretaceous

Trace fossil classification
- Ichnofamily: †Trypanitidae
- Ichnogenus: †Paleobuprestis; Walker, 1938

Type ichnospecies
- Paleobuprestis maxima Walker, 1938

Ichnospecies
- P. maxima Walker, 1938; P. minima Walker, 1938; P. sudeticus Muszer & Uglik, 2013

Synonyms
- Archeobuprestis Bellamy, 2006

Genus of beetles

Paleobuprestis is an ichnogenus of bioerosion trace fossils found in wood that are thought to have been produced by the larvae of beetles in the family Buprestidae (the jewel beetles). It was first described by American paleontologist and park naturalist Myrl V. Walker in 1938, based on channels found just under the bark of petrified logs from the Petrified Forest National Park in Arizona, dated to the Late Triassic epoch. He described two different species of these markings: Paleobuprestis maxima for channels with a diameter of about 10 mm, and Paleobuprestis minima for those with a diameter of only 2 mm. Paleobuprestis has since also been recorded from the Upper Jurassic Morrison Formation and the Upper Cretaceous Price River Formation. In 2013, a third ichnospecies, Paleobuprestis sudeticus, was described from the Viséan-aged Paprotnia Beds in the Polish Sudetes. In 2006, Charles L. Bellamy established a new genus-group name Archeobuprestis for P. maxima and P. minima, considering the name Paleobuprestis to be unavailable under the International Code of Zoological Nomenclature because it was described after 1930 without a type species designation in its original publication.

Wisshak, Knaust and Bertling (2019) classify the ichnogenus Paleobuprestis as a member of the ichnofamily Trypanitidae, which also includes the common trace fossil Trypanites.
