= Fuesslinia =

Fuesslinia amoena

Scientific classification
- Kingdom: Animalia
- Phylum: Arthropoda
- Class: Insecta
- Order: Coleoptera
- Suborder: Polyphaga
- Infraorder: Elateriformia
- Family: Buprestidae
- Genus: Fuesslinia; Heer, 1847
- Species: F. amoena

Binomial name
- Fuesslinia amoena Heer, 1847

Genus of beetles

Fuesslinia amoena is a fossil species of beetles in the family Buprestidae, the only species in the genus Fuesslinia.
