= Mixochlorus =

Scientific classification
- Kingdom: Animalia
- Phylum: Arthropoda
- Class: Insecta
- Order: Coleoptera
- Suborder: Polyphaga
- Infraorder: Elateriformia
- Family: Buprestidae
- Genus: Mixochlorus; Waterhouse, 1887

Genus of beetles

Mixochlorus is a genus of beetles in the family Buprestidae, containing the following species:

- Mixochlorus elegans Fisher, 1925
- Mixochlorus lateralis Waterhouse, 1889
- Mixochlorus suturalis Waterhouse, 1887
