= Sinokele =

Sinokele mirabilis

Scientific classification
- Kingdom: Animalia
- Phylum: Arthropoda
- Class: Insecta
- Order: Coleoptera
- Suborder: Polyphaga
- Infraorder: Elateriformia
- Family: Buprestidae
- Genus: Sinokele; Bily, 1989
- Species: S. mirabilis

Binomial name
- Sinokele mirabilis Bily, 1989

Genus of beetles

Sinokele is a monotypic genus of beetles in the family Buprestidae, the jewel beetles. The single species is Sinokele mirabilis.

This beetle is native to southern China, where it lives on pine trees.
