= Roswitha (beetle) =

Scientific classification
- Kingdom: Animalia
- Phylum: Arthropoda
- Class: Insecta
- Order: Coleoptera
- Suborder: Polyphaga
- Infraorder: Elateriformia
- Family: Buprestidae
- Genus: Roswitha; Bellamy, 1997

Genus of beetles

Roswitha is a genus of Jewel Beetles in the family Buprestidae. There are at least two described species in Roswitha, found in the Afrotropics.

== Species ==
These two species belong to the genus Roswitha:

- Roswitha bilyi Bellamy, 1997
- Roswitha endroedyi Bellamy, 1997
