= Neobuprestis =

Scientific classification
- Kingdom: Animalia
- Phylum: Arthropoda
- Class: Insecta
- Order: Coleoptera
- Suborder: Polyphaga
- Infraorder: Elateriformia
- Family: Buprestidae
- Genus: Neobuprestis; Kerremans, 1903

Genus of beetles

Neobuprestis is a genus of beetles in the family Buprestidae, containing the following species:

- Neobuprestis albosparsa Carter, 1924
- Neobuprestis frenchi (Blackburn, 1892)
- Neobuprestis marmorata (Blackburn, 1892)
- Neobuprestis peroni (Gory & Laporte, 1838)
- Neobuprestis trisulcata Carter, 1932
