= Peronaemis =

Scientific classification
- Kingdom: Animalia
- Phylum: Arthropoda
- Class: Insecta
- Order: Coleoptera
- Suborder: Polyphaga
- Infraorder: Elateriformia
- Family: Buprestidae
- Genus: Peronaemis; Waterhouse, 1887

Genus of beetles

Peronaemis is a genus of beetles in the family Buprestidae, containing the following species:

- Peronaemis cupricollis Fisher, 1949
- Peronaemis elegans Fisher, 1930
- Peronaemis insulicolis Fisher, 1940
- Peronaemis monticolus Fisher, 1936
- Peronaemis thoracicus Waterhouse, 1887
- Peronaemis viridimaculatus (Fisher, 1925)
- Peronaemis viridithorax Zayas, 1988
