= Lamprocheila =

Scientific classification
- Kingdom: Animalia
- Phylum: Arthropoda
- Class: Insecta
- Order: Coleoptera
- Suborder: Polyphaga
- Infraorder: Elateriformia
- Family: Buprestidae
- Genus: Lamprocheila; Saunders, 1871

Genus of beetles

Lamprocheila is a genus of beetles in the family Buprestidae, containing the following species:

- Lamprocheila maillei (Laporte & Gory, 1835)
- Lamprocheila splendida Akiyama, 1993
