= A. aenescens =

A. aenescens may refer to:

- Abacetus aenescens, a South African ground beetle
- Afromelittia aenescens, an African moth
- Altica aenescens, a European leaf beetle
- Anthaxia aenescens, a North American jewel beetle
- Anthomyia aenescens, a synonym of Hydrotaea aenescens, commonly known as the black dump fly
- Attus aenescens, a synonym of Sibianor aurocinctus, a Palearctic jumping spider
