= B. laeta =

B. laeta may refer to:

- Brachodes laeta, a European moth
- Buprestis laeta, a jewel beetle
