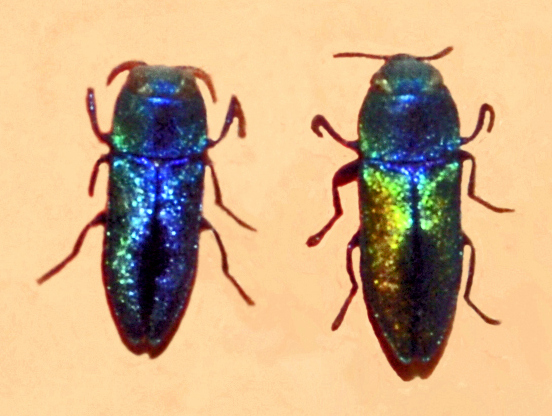
- Anthaxia cichorii, male and female. Museum specimen

Scientific classification
- Kingdom: Animalia
- Phylum: Arthropoda
- Clade: Pancrustacea
- Class: Insecta
- Order: Coleoptera
- Suborder: Polyphaga
- Infraorder: Elateriformia
- Family: Buprestidae
- Genus: Anthaxia
- Species: A. cichorii

Binomial name
- Anthaxia cichorii (Olivier, 1790)

Synonyms
- Anthaxia azurea Abeile de Perrin, 1909; Anthaxia chamomillae Mannerheim, 1837; Anthaxia cichorii cichorii (Olivier, 1790); Anthaxia gibbicollis Rey, 1891; Anthaxia parthica Obenberger, 1914; Anthaxia turcomanica Obenberger, 1938; Buprestis cichorii Olivier, 1790; Haplanthaxia cichori

= Anthaxia cichorii =

Species of beetle

Anthaxia cichorii is a species of jewel beetle belonging to the family Buprestidae, subfamily Buprestinae.

== Description ==
Anthaxia cichorii can reach a length of 5–6.5 millimetres (0.20–0.26 in). These beetles can be found from April to August. Larvae feed on Pyrus communis, Malus domestica, Prunus domestica, Ficus carica and Prunus cerasus .

== Distribution ==
This species is present in most of Europe, in the East Palearctic ecozone and in the Near East.
