= Afromelittia iridisquama =

Scientific classification
- Domain: Eukaryota
- Kingdom: Animalia
- Phylum: Arthropoda
- Class: Insecta
- Order: Lepidoptera
- Family: Sesiidae
- Genus: Afromelittia
- Species: A. iridisquama

Binomial name
- Afromelittia iridisquama (Mabille, 1890)

Synonyms
- Melittia iridisquama Mabille, 1890

Species of moth

Afromelittia iridisquama is a moth of the family Sesiidae. It is known from western Africa.
