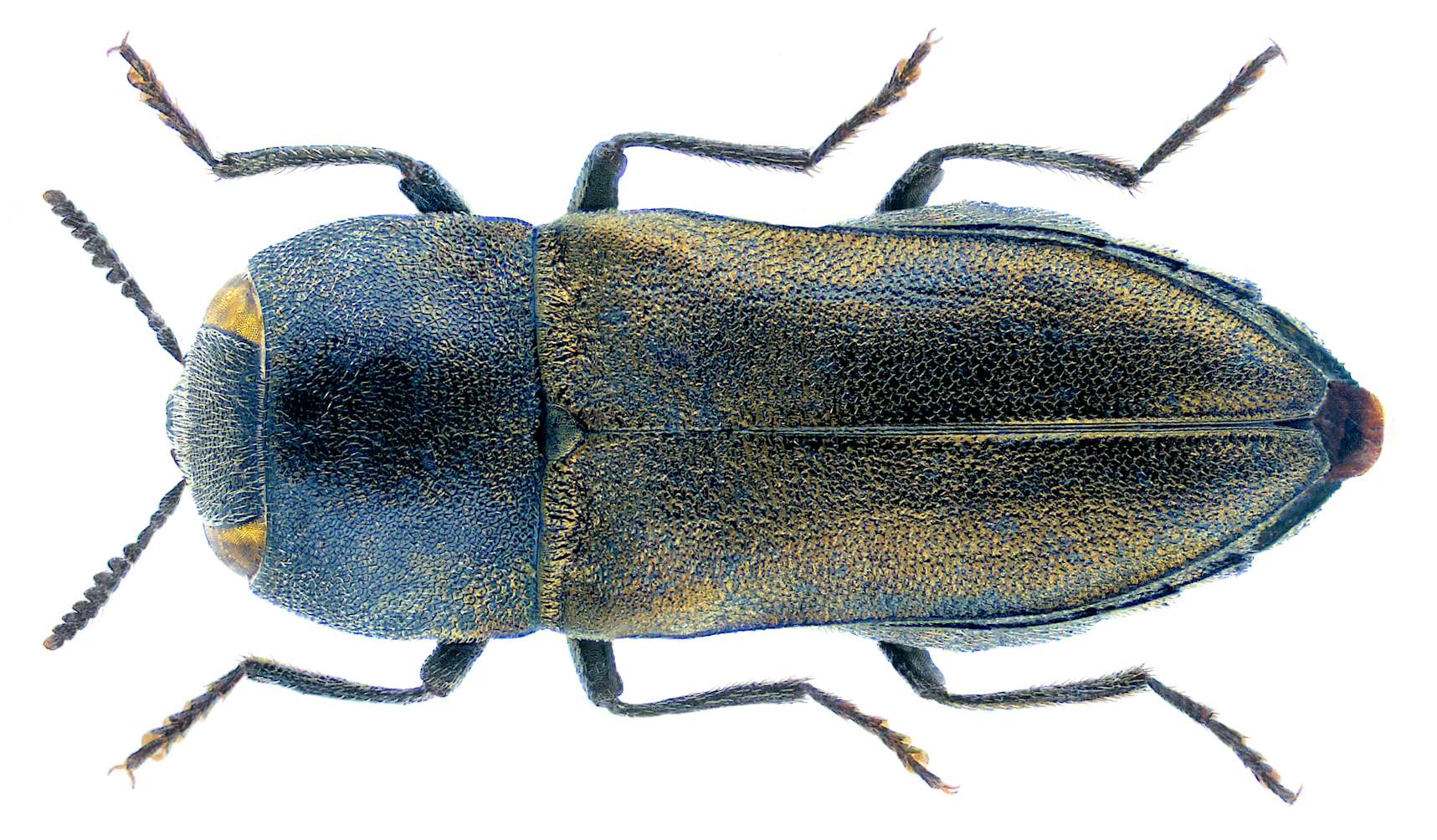

Scientific classification
- Kingdom: Animalia
- Phylum: Arthropoda
- Class: Insecta
- Order: Coleoptera
- Suborder: Polyphaga
- Infraorder: Elateriformia
- Family: Buprestidae
- Genus: Anthaxia
- Species: A. umbellatarum

Binomial name
- Anthaxia umbellatarum Fabricius, 1787

= Anthaxia umbellatarum =

Species of jewel beetle

Anthaxia umbellatarum is a species of jewel beetle in the subfamily Buprestinae. It was first described Fabricius in 1787.

== Taxonomy ==
Germar described a form with two dark spots on the pronotum that are only recognizable with suitable lighting called Buprestis inculta. It was originally described as a separate species and is now considered a synonym of Anthaxia umbellatarum.

In 1900, Abeille de Perrin described a species of beetle found in North Africa named Anthaxia domina, which is now considered as the subspecies Anthaxia umbellatarum domina .

== Description ==
The usually shiny beetle is 4.5 to seven millimeters long. The European subspecies Anthaxia umbellatarum umbellatarum is usually bright copper-colored on the upper side, the underside is ore-colored, the head can be bluish. The subspecies Anthaxia umbellatarum domina from North Africa is unicolored silky green or partially or completely golden.

== Range ==
Anthaxia umbellatarum is a holomediterranean species that is widespread in North Africa and southern Europe from Portugal to the Middle East and southern Russia. Old reports from Central Europe are not supported by evidence and may be due to incorrect identification.
