= Anthaxia fisheri =

Scientific classification
- Domain: Eukaryota
- Kingdom: Animalia
- Phylum: Arthropoda
- Class: Insecta
- Order: Coleoptera
- Suborder: Polyphaga
- Infraorder: Elateriformia
- Family: Buprestidae
- Genus: Anthaxia
- Species: A. fisheri

Binomial name
- Anthaxia fisheri Obenberger, 1928

Species of beetle

Anthaxia fisheri is a species of metallic wood-boring beetle in the family Buprestidae. It is found in North America.
