= Anthaxia caseyi =

Scientific classification
- Domain: Eukaryota
- Kingdom: Animalia
- Phylum: Arthropoda
- Class: Insecta
- Order: Coleoptera
- Suborder: Polyphaga
- Infraorder: Elateriformia
- Family: Buprestidae
- Genus: Anthaxia
- Species: A. caseyi

Binomial name
- Anthaxia caseyi Obenberger, 1914

Species of beetle

Anthaxia caseyi is a species of metallic wood-boring beetle in the family Buprestidae. It is found in North America.

== Subspecies ==
These four subspecies belong to the species Anthaxia caseyi:

- Anthaxia caseyi caseyi Obenberger, 1914
- Anthaxia caseyi pseudotsugae Chamberlin, 1928
- Anthaxia caseyi santarosae Cobos, 1958
- Anthaxia caseyi sublaevis Van Dyke, 1916
