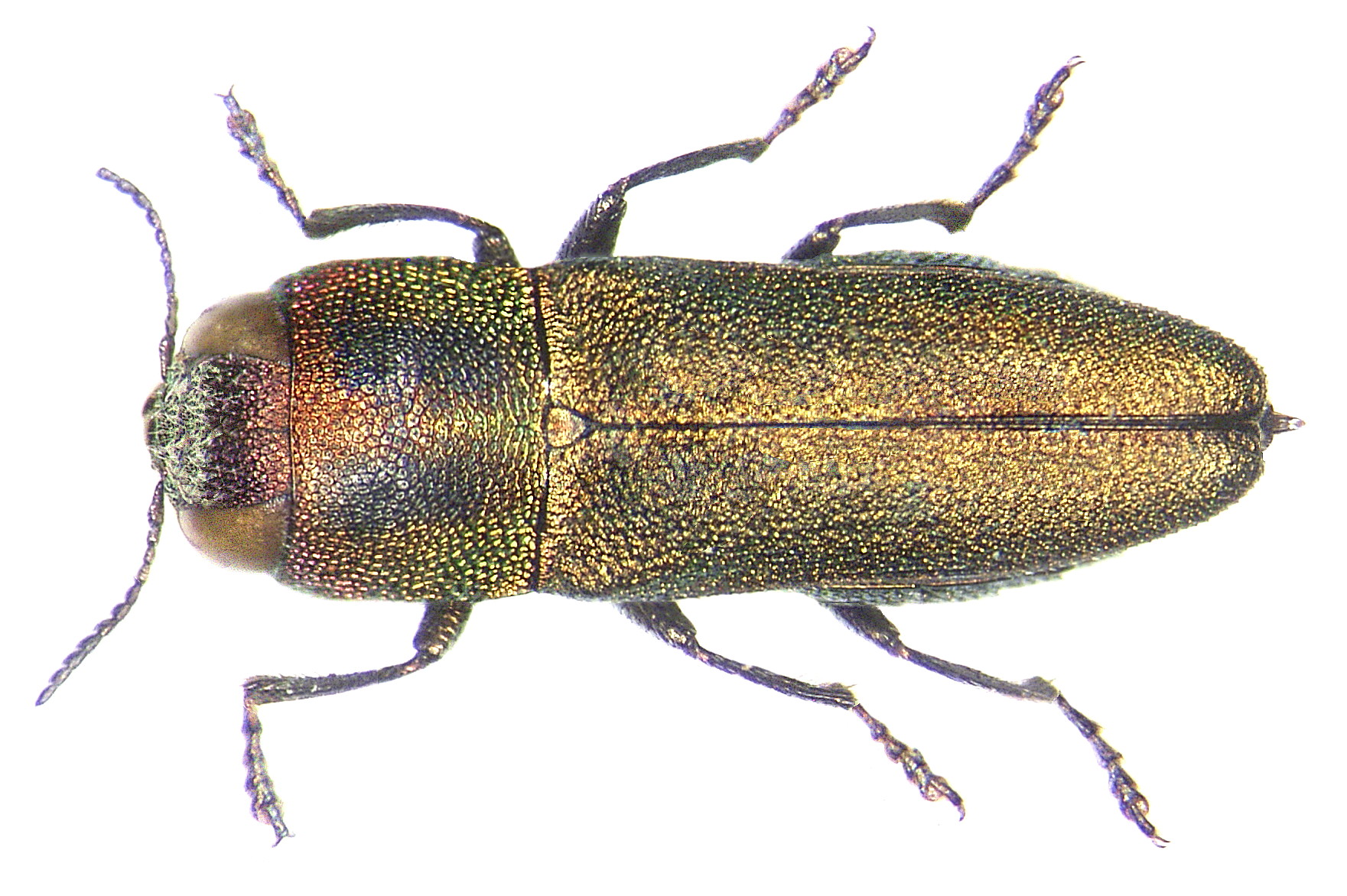
- Anthaxia binotata

Scientific classification
- Kingdom: Animalia
- Phylum: Arthropoda
- Clade: Pancrustacea
- Class: Insecta
- Order: Coleoptera
- Suborder: Polyphaga
- Infraorder: Elateriformia
- Family: Buprestidae
- Subfamily: Buprestinae
- Tribe: Anthaxiini
- Genus: Anthaxia; Eschscholtz, 1829

= Anthaxia =

Genus of beetles

Anthaxia is a genus of beetles in the family Buprestidae.

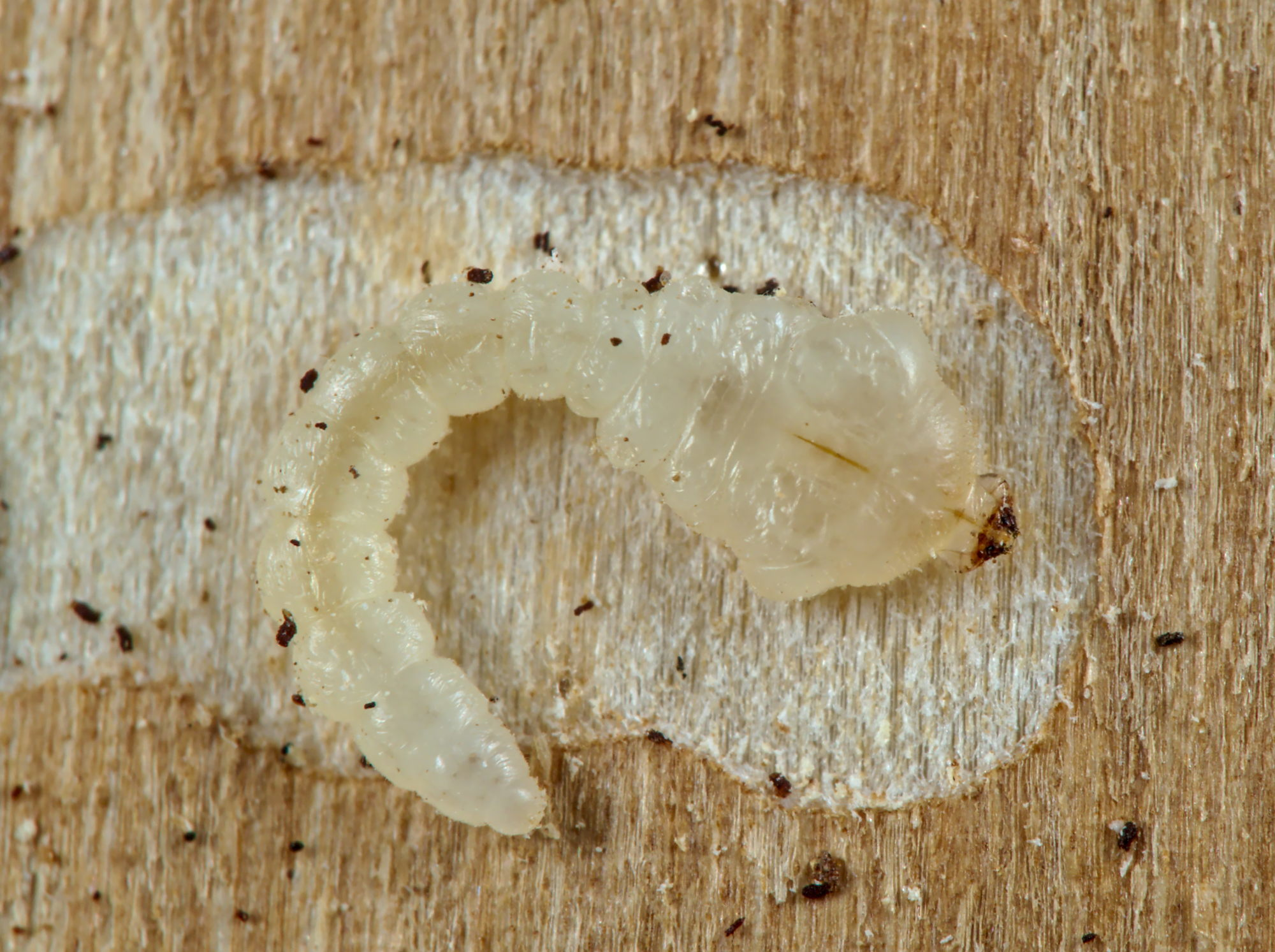
Anthaxia quadripunctata larva

== Subgenera ==
There are seven subgenera of Anthaxia:

- Anthaxia (Anthaxia) Eschscholtz, 1829
- Anthaxia (Haplanthaxia) Reitter, 1911
- Anthaxia (Melanthaxia) Richter, 1944
- Anthaxia (Cratomerus) Solier 1833
- Anthaxia (Merocratus) Bílý 1989
- Anthaxia (Thailandia) Bílý 1990
- Anthaxia (Richteraxia) Bílý 2019

== Species ==
The genus contains the following species:

- Anthaxia abdita Bílý, 1982
- Anthaxia abyssinica Théry, 1896
- Anthaxia acaciae Fisher, 1935
- Anthaxia acutangula Motschulsky, 1861
- Anthaxia acutipennis Bílý, 2010
- Anthaxia adenensis Bílý, 1973
- Anthaxia adiyamana Svoboda, 1994
- Anthaxia aenea Gory & Laporte, 1839
- Anthaxia aeneocuprea Kerremans, 1913
- Anthaxia aeneogaster Gory & Laporte, 1839
- Anthaxia aeneopicea Kerremans, 1900
- Anthaxia aenescens Casey, 1884
- Anthaxia aethiopica Bílý, 2020
- Anthaxia affabilis Kerremans, 1913
- Anthaxia africandra Bílý & Kubáň, 2010
- Anthaxia agilis Obenberger, 1958
- Anthaxia akiyamai Bílý, 1989
- Anthaxia aladin Obenberger, 1928
- Anthaxia albovillosa Kerremans, 1913
- Anthaxia alcmaeone Obenberger, 1938
- Anthaxia alfieri Théry, 1929
- Anthaxia altaica Cobos, 1968
- Anthaxia alziari Magnani, 1993
- Anthaxia amasina Daniel, 1903
- Anthaxia amplithorax Kerremans, 1903
- Anthaxia anadyomene Bílý & Kubá, 2004
- Anthaxia analabensis Descarpentries, 1969
- Anthaxia anatolica Chevrolat, 1838
- Anthaxia andreinii Kerremans, 1907
- Anthaxia andrewesi Obenberger, 1922
- Anthaxia androyensis Descarpentries, 1967
- Anthaxia angulaticollis Kurosawa, 1956
- Anthaxia angulinota Bílý, 1984
- Anthaxia angustipennis (Klug, 1829)
- Anthaxia antamponensis Descarpentries, 1969
- Anthaxia antennata Bílý, 2011
- Anthaxia antinoe Cobos, 1953
- Anthaxia antoinei Baudon, 1955
- Anthaxia aprutiana Gerini, 1955
- Anthaxia arakii Kurosawa, 1956
- Anthaxia aresteni Baudon, 1959
- Anthaxia ariadna Bílý, 1982
- Anthaxia armeniaca Obenberger, 1929
- Anthaxia aspera Bílý, 1977
- Anthaxia astoreth Obenberger, 1934
- Anthaxia asumarina Obenberger, 1928
- Anthaxia aterrima Kerremans, 1903
- Anthaxia atomaria Obenberger, 1922
- Anthaxia aureoviridis Svoboda, 1994
- Anthaxia auricollis Kerremans, 1903
- Anthaxia auriventris Ballion, 1871
- Anthaxia aurohumeralis Bílý, 2000
- Anthaxia aurolanata Bílý, 1980
- Anthaxia auroscutellata Obenberger, 1938
- Anthaxia auroviolacea Bílý, 2011
- Anthaxia baconis Thomson, 1879
- Anthaxia badghyzica Bílý, 1991
- Anthaxia baicalensis Obenberger, 1938
- Anthaxia baiocchii Magnani & Izzillo, 1998
- Anthaxia bambisina Obenberger, 1928
- Anthaxia barbieri Descarpentries, 1958
- Anthaxia barri Bílý, 1995
- Anthaxia baudoni Herman, 1966
- Anthaxia baumi Obenberger, 1928
- Anthaxia baumiella Obenberger, 1939
- Anthaxia bedeli Abeille de Perrin, 1893
- Anthaxia beesoni Obenberger, 1928
- Anthaxia beesoniana Gebhardt, 1926
- Anthaxia bekilyensis Descarpentries, 1967
- Anthaxia belalonensis Descarpentries, 1969
- Anthaxia bellamyi Bílý, 2002
- Anthaxia bellissima Bílý, 1990
- Anthaxia beloudjistana Bílý, 1983
- Anthaxia beneckei Förster, 1885
- Anthaxia beninensis Bílý, 2010
- Anthaxia bercedoi Bílý, 2006
- Anthaxia bergrothi Obenberger, 1928
- Anthaxia berytensis Abeille de Perrin, 1895
- Anthaxia bettagi Niehuis, 1983
- Anthaxia bezdeki Oboril, 2006
- Anthaxia bicolor Falderman, 1835
- Anthaxia bicolorata Bílý & Svoboda, 2001
- Anthaxia bilyi Curletti, 1984
- Anthaxia binotata Chevrolat, 1838
- Anthaxia blascoi Murria Beltrán & Murria Beltrán, 2005
- Anthaxia boera Obenberger, 1922
- Anthaxia boettcheri Obenberger, 1928
- Anthaxia boissyi Levey, 1985
- Anthaxia bonvouloirii Abeille de Perrin, 1869
- Anthaxia borneicola Obenberger, 1924
- Anthaxia bosdaghensis Obenberger, 1938
- Anthaxia braunsi Obenberger, 1922
- Anthaxia breviformis Kalashian, 1988
- Anthaxia brevis Gory & Laporte, 1839
- Anthaxia brevissima Bílý, 1990
- Anthaxia brodskyi Bílý, 1982
- Anthaxia brunneicolor Bílý, 1995
- Anthaxia brunneipilis Bílý & Kubáň, 2010
- Anthaxia buettikeri Bílý, 1979
- Anthaxia buschi Assmann, 1870
- Anthaxia cadiformis Bílý, 2010
- Anthaxia caerulea Bílý, 2020
- Anthaxia californica Obenberger, 1914
- Anthaxia callicera Gerstäcker, 1884
- Anthaxia candens (Panzer, 1793)
- Anthaxia candensiformis Novak, 2006
- Anthaxia candiota Obenberger, 1938
- Anthaxia capensis Kerremans, 1903
- Anthaxia capitata Kerremans, 1892
- Anthaxia carbonaria Heyden & Heyden, 1865
- Anthaxia carinivertex Bílý, 2008
- Anthaxia carmelita Abeille de Perrin, 1900
- Anthaxia carmen Obenberger, 1912
- Anthaxia carniolica (Pongrácz, 1935)
- Anthaxia carolinensis Obenberger, 1928
- Anthaxia carya Wellso & Jackman, 2006
- Anthaxia caseyi Obenberger, 1914
- Anthaxia cashmirensis Obenberger, 1938
- Anthaxia castanopsivora Bílý, 1998
- Anthaxia castiliana Obenberger, 1914
- Anthaxia caucasica Abeille de Perrin, 1900
- Anthaxia caudipennis Bílý, 1983
- Anthaxia cavazzutii Bílý, 1980
- Anthaxia ceballosi Escalera, 1931
- Anthaxia cebecci Baiocchi & Magnani, 2018
- Anthaxia cedri Obenberger, 1938
- Anthaxia chaerodrys Szallies, 2001
- Anthaxia chevrieri Gory & Laporte, 1839
- Anthaxia chinensis Kerremans, 1898
- Anthaxia chlorocephala Chevrolat, 1838
- Anthaxia chlorophylla Obenberger, 1928
- Anthaxia cichorii (Olivier, 1790)
- Anthaxia circe Obenberger, 1931
- Anthaxia cleopatra Obenberger, 1913
- Anthaxia clio Bílý, 1989
- Anthaxia cobosi Descarpentries & Mateu, 1965
- Anthaxia coelestis Théry, 1947
- Anthaxia coelicolor Obenberger, 1922
- Anthaxia collaris Kerremans, 1893
- Anthaxia colmanti Kerremans, 1909
- Anthaxia colonialis Obenberger, 1917
- Anthaxia combusta Obenberger, 1922
- Anthaxia confusa Gory, 1841
- Anthaxia congolana Kerremans, 1909
- Anthaxia congregata (Klug, 1829)
- Anthaxia conradti Semenov, 1891
- Anthaxia constricticollis Bílý, 2008
- Anthaxia convexicollis Obenberger, 1938
- Anthaxia convexiptera Bílý & Sakalian, 2014
- Anthaxia coomani Baudon, 1963
- Anthaxia corinthia Reiche & Saulcy, 1856
- Anthaxia corsica Reiche, 1861
- Anthaxia crassa Obenberger, 1922
- Anthaxia crassicollis Heer, 1862
- Anthaxia cratomerella Bílý & Svoboda, 2001
- Anthaxia cratomerina Obenberger, 1922
- Anthaxia croesus Villers, 1789
- Anthaxia crotonivora Bílý, 2006
- Anthaxia cuneiptera Bílý, 1999
- Anthaxia cupressi Bílý, 2005
- Anthaxia cupriola Barr, 1971
- Anthaxia cuprivittis Obenberger, 1928
- Anthaxia curlettii Magnani, 1993
- Anthaxia cyanella Gory, 1841
- Anthaxia cyaneonigra Svoboda, 1995
- Anthaxia cyaneoptera Bílý, 1990
- Anthaxia cyanescens Gory, 1841
- Anthaxia cyanicolor Obenberger, 1941
- Anthaxia cylindrica Abeille de Perrin, 1900
- Anthaxia cymbiformis Bílý, 1990
- Anthaxia cypraea Abeille de Perrin, 1900
- Anthaxia cytheraea Obenberger, 1931
- Anthaxia dahoi Baudon, 1966
- Anthaxia danangensis Bílý, 1991
- Anthaxia dauensis Obenberger, 1924
- Anthaxia dayaka Bílý, 1991
- Anthaxia dechambrei Bílý, 1991
- Anthaxia decorsei Descarpentries, 1967
- Anthaxia deimos Bílý, 2017
- Anthaxia delagoana Obenberger, 1917
- Anthaxia deleta Heer, 1865
- Anthaxia denesi Svoboda, 2000
- Anthaxia depressicollis Obenberger, 1922
- Anthaxia depressifrons Bílý, 2006
- Anthaxia deyrollei Bílý, 1998
- Anthaxia diadema (Fischer von Waldheim, 1824)
- Anthaxia dichroa Bílý, 1991
- Anthaxia dilatipes Obenberger, 1928
- Anthaxia dimidiata (Thunberg, 1789)
- Anthaxia discicollis Gory & Laporte, 1839
- Anthaxia dispar Kerremans, 1898
- Anthaxia dives Obenberger, 1914
- Anthaxia doris Heer, 1862
- Anthaxia doukamensis Théry, 1937
- Anthaxia douquetteae Descarpentries, 1969
- Anthaxia drawida Obenberger, 1924
- Anthaxia dundai Bílý, 1992
- Anthaxia durbanensis Obenberger, 1938
- Anthaxia duvivieri Kerremans, 1898
- Anthaxia egena Kerremans, 1913
- Anthaxia egeniformis Bílý & Kubáň, 2010
- Anthaxia eggeri Brandl, 2003
- Anthaxia elaeagni (Richter, 1945)
- Anthaxia elberti Brandl, 1993
- Anthaxia elegantula Obenberger, 1924
- Anthaxia eloumdenica Oboril, 2006
- Anthaxia emarginata Barr, 1971
- Anthaxia embrikstrandella Obenberger, 1936
- Anthaxia emmaae Descarpentries, 1967
- Anthaxia ennediana Descarpentries & Mateu, 1965
- Anthaxia eocenica Bílý, 1996
- Anthaxia ephippiata Redtenbacher, 1850
- Anthaxia episcopalis Théry, 1905
- Anthaxia erato Bílý, 1989
- Anthaxia erichbettagi Svoboda & Niehuis, 2002
- Anthaxia escalerae Obenberger, 1913
- Anthaxia escalerina Obenberger, 1923
- Anthaxia escalerinella Novak, 1988
- Anthaxia espanoli Cobos, 1954
- Anthaxia eudoxia Obenberger, 1931
- Anthaxia eugeniae Ganglbauer, 1885
- Anthaxia eulioxa Obenberger, 1931
- Anthaxia eumede Théry, 1947
- Anthaxia eupoeta Obenberger, 1928
- Anthaxia exasperans Cobos, 1958
- Anthaxia exhumata Wickham, 1913
- Anthaxia expansa LeConte, 1860
- Anthaxia exsul Obenberger, 1914
- Anthaxia facialis Erichson, 1843
- Anthaxia fageli Descarpentries, 1955
- Anthaxia fahraei Obenberger, 1930
- Anthaxia fairmairella Obenberger, 1928
- Anthaxia farah Bílý, 1983
- Anthaxia farinigera Kraatz in Heyden & Kraatz, 1882
- Anthaxia fedtschenkoi Semenov, 1895
- Anthaxia feloi Liberto, 2001
- Anthaxia fernandezi Cobos, 1953
- Anthaxia fesana Bílý, 2006
- Anthaxia fisheri Obenberger, 1928
- Anthaxia flammifrons Semenov, 1891
- Anthaxia flavicomes Abeille de Perrin, 1900
- Anthaxia formosensis Bílý, 1980
- Anthaxia fossicollis Kerremans, 1899
- Anthaxia fossifrons Obenberger, 1928
- Anthaxia fouqueti Bourgoin, 1923
- Anthaxia francescoi Sparacio & Svoboda, 1999
- Anthaxia fritschi Heyden, 1887
- Anthaxia fuksai Obenberger, 1928
- Anthaxia fulgidipennis Lucas, 1846
- Anthaxia fulgurans (Schran, 1789)
- Anthaxia funerula (Illiger, 1803)
- Anthaxia furnissi Barr, 1971
- Anthaxia gabonica Bílý, 2000
- Anthaxia gansuensis Bílý, 1991
- Anthaxia gebhardti Obenberger, 1924
- Anthaxia gedrosiana Bílý, 1983
- Anthaxia geiseltalensis Weidlich, 1987
- Anthaxia genistae Bílý, 2006
- Anthaxia gestroi Théry, 1927
- Anthaxia ghazi Obenberger, 1938
- Anthaxia gianassoi Curletti & Magnani, 1992
- Anthaxia gianfrancoi Bílý, 2000
- Anthaxia glabricollis Bílý, 2010
- Anthaxia glabrifrons Abeille de Perrin, 1900
- Anthaxia godeti Gory & Laporte, 1839
- Anthaxia gongeti Oboril, 2006
- Anthaxia gottwaldi Brandl & Mühle, 2008
- Anthaxia graeca Bílý, 1984
- Anthaxia granatensis Verdugo, 2013
- Anthaxia griseocuprea Kiesenwetter, 1857
- Anthaxia guanche Liberto, 2001
- Anthaxia guizhouensis Bílý, 1996
- Anthaxia gunningi Kerremans, 1911
- Anthaxia gussmannae Bílý, 2002
- Anthaxia hackeri Frivaldszky, 1884
- Anthaxia hardenbergi Obenberger, 1924
- Anthaxia hatayamai Bílý, 1990
- Anthaxia hatchi Barr, 1971
- Anthaxia haupti Bílý, 1995
- Anthaxia hauzeri Kerremans, 1900
- Anthaxia helferi Obenberger, 1928
- Anthaxia helferiana Bílý, 1995
- Anthaxia heliophila Théry, 1911
- Anthaxia helvetica Stierlin, 1868
- Anthaxia hemichrysis Abeille de Perrin, 1893
- Anthaxia hepneri Bílý, 2006
- Anthaxia herbertschmidi Novak, 1992
- Anthaxia heringi Obenberger, 1938
- Anthaxia hesperis Obenberger, 1931
- Anthaxia heydeni Abeille de Perrin, 1893
- Anthaxia heyrovskyi Bílý, 1992
- Anthaxia hilaris Gory, 1841
- Anthaxia hladili Bílý, 1984
- Anthaxia holmi Bílý, 2002
- Anthaxia holoptera Obenberger, 1914
- Anthaxia holubi Obenberger, 1913
- Anthaxia holynskii Bílý, 1990
- Anthaxia hornburgi Bílý, 2008
- Anthaxia hottentotta Obenberger, 1923
- Anthaxia houskai Obenberger, 1946
- Anthaxia hova Théry, 1905
- Anthaxia hozaki Bílý, 1973
- Anthaxia huashanica Bílý, 1993
- Anthaxia hungarica (Scopoli, 1772)
- Anthaxia hurdi Cobos, 1958
- Anthaxia hydropica Théry, 1905
- Anthaxia hyperlasia Obenberger, 1928
- Anthaxia hypomelaena (Illiger, 1803)
- Anthaxia hypsibata Obenberger, 1924
- Anthaxia hypsigenia Obenberger, 1938
- Anthaxia hyrcana Kirsch in Kiesenwetter & Kirsch, 1880
- Anthaxia idae Obenberger, 1938
- Anthaxia ignipennis Abeille de Perrin, 1882
- Anthaxia ikuthana Obenberger, 1928
- Anthaxia iliensis Obenberger, 1914
- Anthaxia imperatrix Obenberger, 1928
- Anthaxia imperfecta LeConte, 1860
- Anthaxia impressifrons Bílý, 1990
- Anthaxia impunctata Abeille de Perrin, 1909
- Anthaxia indicola Théry, 1930
- Anthaxia indigoptera Bílý, 1990
- Anthaxia inornata (Randall, 1838)
- Anthaxia insulaecola Obenberger, 1944
- Anthaxia intermedia Obenberger, 1913
- Anthaxia iranica (Richter, 1949)
- Anthaxia irregularis Abeille de Perrin, 1909
- Anthaxia israelita Abeille de Perrin, 1882
- Anthaxia istriana Rosenhauer, 1847
- Anthaxia iveta Svoboda, 2003
- Anthaxia jakli Bílý, 1996
- Anthaxia javanica Obenberger, 1924
- Anthaxia jendeki Bílý & Sakalian, 2014
- Anthaxia jenisi Bílý, 1006
- Anthaxia jordanensis Bílý, 1984
- Anthaxia juliae Liberto, 1996
- Anthaxia kabateki Bílý, 2006
- Anthaxia kabyliana Obenberger, 1914
- Anthaxia kalalae Baiocchi & Magnani, 2011
- Anthaxia kantneri Svoboda, 2000
- Anthaxia karati Obo il & Bílý, 2003
- Anthaxia karsanthiana Pic, 1917
- Anthaxia kaszabi Cobos, 1966
- Anthaxia katangae Obenberger, 1924
- Anthaxia kedahae Fisher, 1933
- Anthaxia keiseri Descarpentries, 1967
- Anthaxia keniae Théry, 1941
- Anthaxia kerremansiella Bílý, 1995
- Anthaxia kervillei Théry, 1939
- Anthaxia kheiliana Obenberger, 1931
- Anthaxia kiesenwetteri Marseul, 1865
- Anthaxia klessi Niehuis, 1991
- Anthaxia kneuckeri Obenberger, 1920
- Anthaxia knulli Obenberger, 1928
- Anthaxia kochi Obenberger, 1938
- Anthaxia kollari Marseul, 1865
- Anthaxia kondleri Svoboda, 1999
- Anthaxia krali Bílý & Kubáň, 2013
- Anthaxia kreuzbergi Richter, 1944
- Anthaxia krueperi Ganglbauer, 1885
- Anthaxia kryzhanovskii (Alexeev, 1978)
- Anthaxia kubani Bílý, 1986
- Anthaxia kucerai Bílý & Svoboda, 2001
- Anthaxia kurdistana Obenberger, 1912
- Anthaxia kurosawai Bílý, 1989
- Anthaxia lameyi Théry, 1911
- Anthaxia lameyiformis Bílý, 1991
- Anthaxia laotica Baudon, 1966
- Anthaxia laticeps Abeille de Perrin, 1900
- Anthaxia laticollis Bílý & Kubáň, 2009
- Anthaxia lauta Alexeev, 1964
- Anthaxia lecerfi Théry, 1930
- Anthaxia leechi Cobos, 1958
- Anthaxia lencinai Arnáiz & Bercedo, 2003
- Anthaxia lewisi Bílý, 1990
- Anthaxia lgockii Obenberger, 1917
- Anthaxia liae Gobbi, 1983
- Anthaxia libenae Oboril, 2006
- Anthaxia lightfooti Obenberger, 1928
- Anthaxia limpopoensis Obenberger, 1928
- Anthaxia liuchangloi Obenberger, 1958
- Anthaxia longipes Bílý & Kubáň, 2009
- Anthaxia longipilis Bílý, 1998
- Anthaxia lubopetra Bílý, 1995
- Anthaxia lucens Küster, 1852
- Anthaxia lucia Bílý, 2006
- Anthaxia luctuosa Lucas, 1846
- Anthaxia ludovicae Abeille de Perrin, 1900
- Anthaxia lukesi Obenberger, 1931
- Anthaxia lukjanovitshi Richter, 1949
- Anthaxia lusitanica Obenberger, 1943
- Anthaxia lyciae Magnani, 1996
- Anthaxia machadoi Descarpentries, 1960
- Anthaxia maculipennis (Haupt, 1956)
- Anthaxia magnanii Baiocchi, 2011
- Anthaxia magnifica Bílý, 1983
- Anthaxia magnifrons Abeille de Perrin, 1907
- Anthaxia majzlani Bílý, 1991
- Anthaxia malachitica Abeille de Perrin, 1893
- Anthaxia malayana Bílý, 1990
- Anthaxia malickyi Obenberger, 1925
- Anthaxia mamaj Pliginski, 1924
- Anthaxia mamorensis Théry, 1930
- Anthaxia manca (Linnaeus, 1767)
- Anthaxia mancatula Abeille de Perrin, 1900
- Anthaxia mannaea Baiocchi, 2011
- Anthaxia maracaensis Théry, 1930
- Anthaxia marani Obenberger, 1938
- Anthaxia margarita Bílý, 1995
- Anthaxia marginata (Thunberg, 1787)
- Anthaxia marginifera Abeille de Perrin, 1907
- Anthaxia margotana Novak, 1983
- Anthaxia marmottani Bristout de Barneville, 1883
- Anthaxia marshalli Stebbing, 1914
- Anthaxia martinhauseri Niehuis, 1996
- Anthaxia masculina Bílý, 1984
- Anthaxia mashuna Obenberger, 1931
- Anthaxia maximiliani Brechtel, 2000
- Anthaxia meda Baiocchi, 2011
- Anthaxia medvedevi Alexeev, 1975
- Anthaxia medvedevorum (Alexeev, 1978)
- Anthaxia mehli Bílý, 1990
- Anthaxia meiseri Novak & Bílý, 1991
- Anthaxia melancholica Gory, 1841
- Anthaxia melanosoma Bílý, 2000
- Anthaxia mendizabali Cobos, 1965
- Anthaxia meregallii Curletti & Magnani, 1985
- Anthaxia meronica Bílý, 1995
- Anthaxia micantula Obenberger, 1924
- Anthaxia midas Kiesenwetter, 1857
- Anthaxia mikesai Novak & Bílý, 1991
- Anthaxia millefolieta Svoboda in Kubá & Svoboda, 2006
- Anthaxia millefolii (Fabricius, 1801)
- Anthaxia mindanaoensis Fisher, 1922
- Anthaxia mirabilis Zhicharev, 1918
- Anthaxia miranda Deyrolle, 1864
- Anthaxia miribella Obenberger, 1938
- Anthaxia mogadorica Bílý, 2006
- Anthaxia moira Obenberger, 1931
- Anthaxia moises Obenberger, 1921
- Anthaxia mokrzeckii Obenberger, 1927
- Anthaxia monardi Théry, 1947
- Anthaxia monbasica Théry, 1930
- Anthaxia montana Kerremans, 1908
- Anthaxia montivaga Bílý, 1984
- Anthaxia morgani Théry, 1925
- Anthaxia morio (Fabricius, 1793)
- Anthaxia morosa Kerremans, 1892
- Anthaxia morula Théry, 1947
- Anthaxia moya Chûjô, 1970
- Anthaxia muehlei Niehuis, 1983
- Anthaxia muliebris Obenberger, 1918
- Anthaxia multichroa Bílý, 1990
- Anthaxia mundula Kiesenwetter, 1857
- Anthaxia myrmidon Abeille de Perrin, 1891
- Anthaxia mysteriosa Obenberger, 1917
- Anthaxia nairobiensis Théry, 1941
- Anthaxia nanissima Alexeev, 1964
- Anthaxia nanula Casey, 1884
- Anthaxia naviauxi Bílý, 1995
- Anthaxia navicularis Bílý, 1991
- Anthaxia negrei Cobos, 1953
- Anthaxia neocuris (Fairmaire, 1901)
- Anthaxia neofunerula Obenberger, 1942
- Anthaxia nevadensis Obenberger, 1928
- Anthaxia nickerli Obenberger, 1923
- Anthaxia niehuisi Brandl, 1987
- Anthaxia nigella Obenberger, 1928
- Anthaxia nigricollis Abeille de Perrin, 1904
- Anthaxia nigricornis Kerremans, 1898
- Anthaxia nigritorum Kerremans, 1898
- Anthaxia nigritula (Ratzeburg, 1837)
- Anthaxia nigroaenea Bílý & Sakalian, 2014
- Anthaxia nigrojubata Roubal, 1913
- Anthaxia nitidiventris Fairmaire, 1901
- Anthaxia nitidula (Linnaeus, 1758)
- Anthaxia nitiduliformis Bílý, 1995
- Anthaxia nixa Obenberger, 1931
- Anthaxia njega Obenberger, 1922
- Anthaxia nodifrons Théry, 1949
- Anthaxia notabilis Obenberger, 1941
- Anthaxia novickii Obenberger, 1938
- Anthaxia nuda Bílý, 1990
- Anthaxia nupta Kiesenwetter, 1857
- Anthaxia nyassica Obst, 1903
- Anthaxia nyssa Obenberger, 1931
- Anthaxia obesa Abeille de Perrin, 1900
- Anthaxia obesula Obenberger, 1924
- Anthaxia obliquepilosa Obenberger, 1924
- Anthaxia oborili Bílý, 2006
- Anthaxia obscurans Obenberger, 1922
- Anthaxia obtectans Kerremans, 1909
- Anthaxia occidentalis Bílý, 2020
- Anthaxia occipitalis Deyrolle, 1864
- Anthaxia olifanti Obenberger, 1939
- Anthaxia olivieri Gory & Laporte, 1839
- Anthaxia olympica Kiesenwetter, 1880
- Anthaxia oneili Obenberger, 1931
- Anthaxia onilahyiana Bílý, 2011
- Anthaxia ononidis Sánchez & Tolosa, 2006
- Anthaxia ophthalmica Bílý, 1990
- Anthaxia oreas Peyerimhoff, 1919
- Anthaxia oregonensis Obenberger, 1942
- Anthaxia ornatifrons Obenberger, 1928
- Anthaxia osmastoni Stebbing, 1911
- Anthaxia ovaciki Novak, 1994
- Anthaxia pacata Kerremans, 1913
- Anthaxia palaestinensis Obenberger, 1946
- Anthaxia palawanensis Bílý & Kubán, 2012
- Anthaxia pallas Cobos, 1967
- Anthaxia pallida Heer, 1862
- Anthaxia paphia Novak & Makris, 2002
- Anthaxia paradoxa (Bílý, 1990)
- Anthaxia parallela Gory & Laporte, 1839
- Anthaxia parapleuralis Obenberger, 1929
- Anthaxia pardoi Cobos, 1966
- Anthaxia parvula Baiocchi & Magnani, 2007
- Anthaxia passerinii (Pecchioli, 1837)
- Anthaxia patrizii Théry, 1938
- Anthaxia patsyae Baiocchi, 2008
- Anthaxia pauliani Descarpentries, 1967
- Anthaxia pecani Théry, 1938
- Anthaxia pengi Bílý, 1990
- Anthaxia peninsularis Bílý, 1990
- Anthaxia pennsylvanica Obenberger, 1914
- Anthaxia peratra Obenberger, 1928
- Anthaxia permisa Abeille de Perrin, 1904
- Anthaxia perrieri (Fairmaire, 1900)
- Anthaxia perrini Obenberger, 1918
- Anthaxia persuperba Obenberger, 1912
- Anthaxia peyrierasi Descarpentries, 1967
- Anthaxia philippinensis Bílý & Kubán, 2012
- Anthaxia phobos Bílý, 2017
- Anthaxia phyllanthi Obenberger, 1956
- Anthaxia pienaarica Obenberger, 1928
- Anthaxia pilifrons Kerremans, 1898
- Anthaxia pinda Bílý & Baiocchi, 2009
- Anthaxia pinguis Kiesenwetter, 1880
- Anthaxia platysoma Abeille de Perrin, 1891
- Anthaxia plaviscikovi Obenberger, 1935
- Anthaxia pleuralis Fairmaire, 1883
- Anthaxia plicata Kiesenwetter, 1859
- Anthaxia pochoni Herman, 1969
- Anthaxia podolica Mannerheim, 1837
- Anthaxia porella Barr, 1974
- Anthaxia potanini Ganglbauer, 1890
- Anthaxia praecellens Kerremans, 1909
- Anthaxia praeclara Mannerheim, 1837
- Anthaxia prasina Horn, 1882
- Anthaxia prepsli Bílý, 1995
- Anthaxia primaeva Heer, 1865
- Anthaxia proteiformis Bílý, 1993
- Anthaxia proteus Saunders, 1873
- Anthaxia protractipennis Obenberger, 1914
- Anthaxia protractula Obenberger, 1931
- Anthaxia pseudocongregata Descarpentries & Bruneau de Miré, 1963
- Anthaxia pseudofunerula Bílý, 2006
- Anthaxia pseudogenistae Bílý, 2006
- Anthaxia pseudohilaris Obenberger, 1939
- Anthaxia pseudonitidula Svoboda in Kubán & Svoboda, 2006
- Anthaxia psittacina Heyden, 1887
- Anthaxia puchneri Bílý & Sakalian, 2014
- Anthaxia puella Bílý, 1980
- Anthaxia pulex Abeille de Perrin, 1893
- Anthaxia pumila (Klug, 1829)
- Anthaxia punctifera (Haupt, 1956)
- Anthaxia punjabensis Obenberger, 1928
- Anthaxia purpureifrons Bílý, 2010
- Anthaxia pygaera Obenberger, 1931
- Anthaxia pyropyga Bílý, 1998
- Anthaxia pyrosoma Bílý, 1006
- Anthaxia quadrifoveolata Solsky, 1871
- Anthaxia quadrimaculata (Haupt, 1956)
- Anthaxia quadripunctata (Linnaeus, 1758)
- Anthaxia quercata (Fabricius, 1801)
- Anthaxia quercicola Wellso, 1974
- Anthaxia raharizoninai Descarpentries, 1967
- Anthaxia reitteri Obenberger, 1913
- Anthaxia retamae Bílý, 1995
- Anthaxia reticollis Quedenfeldt, 1886
- Anthaxia reticulata Motschulsky, 1859
- Anthaxia retifer LeConte, 1860
- Anthaxia richteri Stepanov, 1953
- Anthaxia ringenbachi Baiocchi, 2004
- Anthaxia robusticornis Bílý, 1990
- Anthaxia rondoni Baudon, 1962
- Anthaxia rossica Daniel, 1903
- Anthaxia rothkirchi Obenberger, 1922
- Anthaxia roxana Bílý, 1983
- Anthaxia rubididorsa (Haupt, 1956)
- Anthaxia rubifrons Kerremans, 1914
- Anthaxia rubrocyanea Novak, 2008
- Anthaxia rubromarginata Miwa & Chûjô, 1935
- Anthaxia rudebecki Descarpentries, 1970
- Anthaxia rudis Kerremans, 1893
- Anthaxia rugicollis Lucas, 1846
- Anthaxia rungsi Baudon, 1958
- Anthaxia ruth Bílý & Kubáň, 2010
- Anthaxia rutilipennis Abeille de Perrin, 1891
- Anthaxia sagartiana Baiocchi & Magnani, 2011
- Anthaxia sahelica Descarpentries & Bruneau de Miré, 1963
- Anthaxia salicis (Fabricius, 1776)
- Anthaxia samai Curletti & Magnani, 1992
- Anthaxia sarawackensis Deyrolle, 1864
- Anthaxia scabra Théry, 1905
- Anthaxia schah Abeille de Perrin, 1904
- Anthaxia schoenmanni Novak, 1984
- Anthaxia schroederiana Bílý, 1997
- Anthaxia scorzonerae (Frivaldszky, 1838)
- Anthaxia sculptipennis Obenberger, 1924
- Anthaxia sculpturata Barr, 1971
- Anthaxia scurra Bílý & Brodsky, 1982
- Anthaxia scutellaris (Géné, 1839)
- Anthaxia sedilloti Abeille de Perrin, 1893
- Anthaxia segurensis Obenberger, 1924
- Anthaxia semicuprea Küster, 1852
- Anthaxia semiramis Obenberger, 1913
- Anthaxia senicula (Schran, 1789)
- Anthaxia senilis Wollaston, 1864
- Anthaxia sepulchralis (Fabricius, 1801)
- Anthaxia sepulchraloides Cobos, 1962
- Anthaxia serena Daniel, 1903
- Anthaxia serripennis Obenberger, 1936
- Anthaxia setipennis Obenberger, 1928
- Anthaxia sexualis Obenberger, 1928
- Anthaxia seyrigi Descarpentries, 1967
- Anthaxia shirasensis Obenberger, 1940
- Anthaxia siamensis Bílý, 2005
- Anthaxia sicardi Descarpentries, 1967
- Anthaxia sichuanica Bílý, 1993
- Anthaxia signaticollis (Krynicki, 1832)
- Anthaxia simandli Baiocchi, 2013
- Anthaxia simiola Casey, 1884
- Anthaxia simonae Verdugo, Niehuis & Gómez de Dios, 2017
- Anthaxia sinica Bílý, 1994
- Anthaxia sjoestedti Kerremans, 1908
- Anthaxia smaragdiceps Théry, 1941
- Anthaxia smaragdula Gebhardt, 1928
- Anthaxia socotrensis Bílý, 1984
- Anthaxia sordidata Gestro, 1895
- Anthaxia sphenoptera Bílý & Kubáň, 2010
- Anthaxia spinolae Gory & Laporte, 1839
- Anthaxia spinosa Abeille de Perrin, 1900
- Anthaxia splendida Chevrolat, 1838
- Anthaxia sponsa Kiesenwetter, 1857
- Anthaxia stateira Bílý, 1983
- Anthaxia stepanovi Richter, 1949
- Anthaxia sternalis Abeille de Perrin, 1895
- Anthaxia stevensoni Théry, 1932
- Anthaxia strigata LeConte, 1859
- Anthaxia sturanyii Obenberger, 1914
- Anthaxia suaveola Obenberger, 1924
- Anthaxia subprasina Cobos, 1958
- Anthaxia subviolacea Kerremans, 1898
- Anthaxia succinicola Descarpentries, 1967
- Anthaxia sudana Obenberger, 1928
- Anthaxia sulcicollis Obenberger, 1928
- Anthaxia superba Abeille de Perrin, 1900
- Anthaxia suzannae Théry, 1942
- Anthaxia svobodai Bílý, 2005
- Anthaxia syrdarjensis Obenberger, 1934
- Anthaxia syriaca Bílý & Kubá, 2004
- Anthaxia tacita Kerremans, 1913
- Anthaxia taiwanensis Bílý, 1989
- Anthaxia tamdaoensis Bílý, 1998
- Anthaxia tanjorensis Obenberger, 1938
- Anthaxia tanzanica Bílý & Kubáň, 2010
- Anthaxia tarsalis Barr, 1971
- Anthaxia tauricola Magnani, 2002
- Anthaxia tazaotana Cobos, 1956
- Anthaxia teirone Obenberger, 1931
- Anthaxia teloukatiae Descarpentries & Bruneau de Miré, 1963
- Anthaxia tenella Kiesenwetter, 1858
- Anthaxia tenuicula Boheman, 1860
- Anthaxia thailandica Bílý, 1990
- Anthaxia thalassophila Abeille de Perrin, 1900
- Anthaxia theryana Bílý, 1995
- Anthaxia thessalica Brandl, 1981
- Anthaxia thunbergi Gory & Laporte, 1839
- Anthaxia tianshanica Bílý, 1984
- Anthaxia tibetana Bílý, 2003
- Anthaxia togata Abeille de Perrin, 1882
- Anthaxia togataeformis Novak, 2001
- Anthaxia tomyris Obenberger, 1913
- Anthaxia tonkinea Baudon, 1960
- Anthaxia toyamai Bílý, 1989
- Anthaxia tractata Abeille de Perrin, 1901
- Anthaxia tragacanthi Iablokoff-Khnzorian, 1957
- Anthaxia transvalensis Obenberger, 1922
- Anthaxia triangularis Gory, 1841
- Anthaxia tricolor Kerremans, 1912
- Anthaxia trivalis Gory, 1841
- Anthaxia truncata Abeille de Perrin, 1900
- Anthaxia tuerki Ganglbauer, 1886
- Anthaxia turana Obenberger, 1914
- Anthaxia turcica Svoboda, 1994
- Anthaxia turcomanica Obenberger, 1937
- Anthaxia turkestanica Obenberger, 1912
- Anthaxia turnai Bílý & Svoboda, 2001
- Anthaxia turneri Obenberger, 1931
- Anthaxia ulmi Bílý, 2005
- Anthaxia umbellatarum (Fabricius, 1787)
- Anthaxia ursulae Niehuis, 1989
- Anthaxia vadoni Descarpentries, 1967
- Anthaxia vansoni Théry, 1955
- Anthaxia vejdovskyi Obenberger, 1914
- Anthaxia ventricosa Théry, 1905
- Anthaxia verdugoi Bílý, 2006
- Anthaxia vientianei Baudon, 1960
- Anthaxia vietnamica Bílý, 1998
- Anthaxia villiersi Baudon, 1959
- Anthaxia violacea Bílý, 1977
- Anthaxia violaceiceps Obenberger, 1922
- Anthaxia violaceiventris Deyrolle, 1864
- Anthaxia virescens Kerremans, 1893
- Anthaxia viridicornis (Say, 1823)
- Anthaxia viridicyanea Weidlich, 1987
- Anthaxia viridifrons Gory, 1841
- Anthaxia vittipennis Kerremans, 1909
- Anthaxia vittula Kiesenwetter, 1857
- Anthaxia vladivostokana Obenberger, 1938
- Anthaxia volkovitshi Bílý, 1979
- Anthaxia wallowae Obenberger, 1942
- Anthaxia weidlichi Bílý, 1996
- Anthaxia wethloi Obenberger, 1940
- Anthaxia weyersi Kerremans, 1900
- Anthaxia winkleri Obenberger, 1914
- Anthaxia wittmeri Bílý, 1979
- Anthaxia xiahensis Bílý, 1995
- Anthaxia yunnana Bílý, 1990
- Anthaxia zanzibarica Kerremans, 1898
- Anthaxia zarazagai Arnáiz & Bercedo, 2003
