= Afromelittia occidentalis =

Scientific classification
- Kingdom: Animalia
- Phylum: Arthropoda
- Class: Insecta
- Order: Lepidoptera
- Family: Sesiidae
- Genus: Afromelittia
- Species: A. occidentalis

Binomial name
- Afromelittia occidentalis (Le Cerf, 1917)

Synonyms
- Melittia occidentalis Le Cerf, 1917

Species of moth

Afromelittia occidentalis is a moth of the family Sesiidae. It is known from the Republic of the Congo, South Africa and Uganda.
