= Anthaxia cyanella =

Scientific classification
- Kingdom: Animalia
- Phylum: Arthropoda
- Clade: Pancrustacea
- Class: Insecta
- Order: Coleoptera
- Suborder: Polyphaga
- Infraorder: Elateriformia
- Family: Buprestidae
- Genus: Anthaxia
- Species: A. cyanella

Binomial name
- Anthaxia cyanella Gory, 1841

Synonyms
- Anthaxia kaszabiana Pochon, 1967; Anthaxia scoriacea Melsheimer, 1845

Species of beetle

Anthaxia cyanella is a species of metallic wood-boring beetle in the family Buprestidae. It is found in North America.
