= Anthaxia simiola =

Scientific classification
- Kingdom: Animalia
- Phylum: Arthropoda
- Class: Insecta
- Order: Coleoptera
- Suborder: Polyphaga
- Infraorder: Elateriformia
- Family: Buprestidae
- Genus: Anthaxia
- Species: A. simiola

Binomial name
- Anthaxia simiola Casey, 1884

Synonyms
- Anthaxia vandykeana Obenberger, 1936

Species of beetle

Anthaxia simiola is a species of metallic wood-boring beetle in the family Buprestidae. It is found in North America.
