= Afromelittia =

Scientific classification
- Kingdom: Animalia
- Phylum: Arthropoda
- Clade: Pancrustacea
- Class: Insecta
- Order: Lepidoptera
- Family: Sesiidae
- Tribe: Melittiini
- Genus: Afromelittia; Gorbunov & Arita, 1997

Species
- See text

Genus of moths

Afromelittia is a genus of moths in the family Sesiidae.

== Species ==
- Afromelittia aenescens (Butler, 1896)
- Afromelittia iridisquama (Mabille, 1890)
- Afromelittia natalensis (Butler, 1874)
- Afromelittia occidentalis (Le Cerf, 1917)
