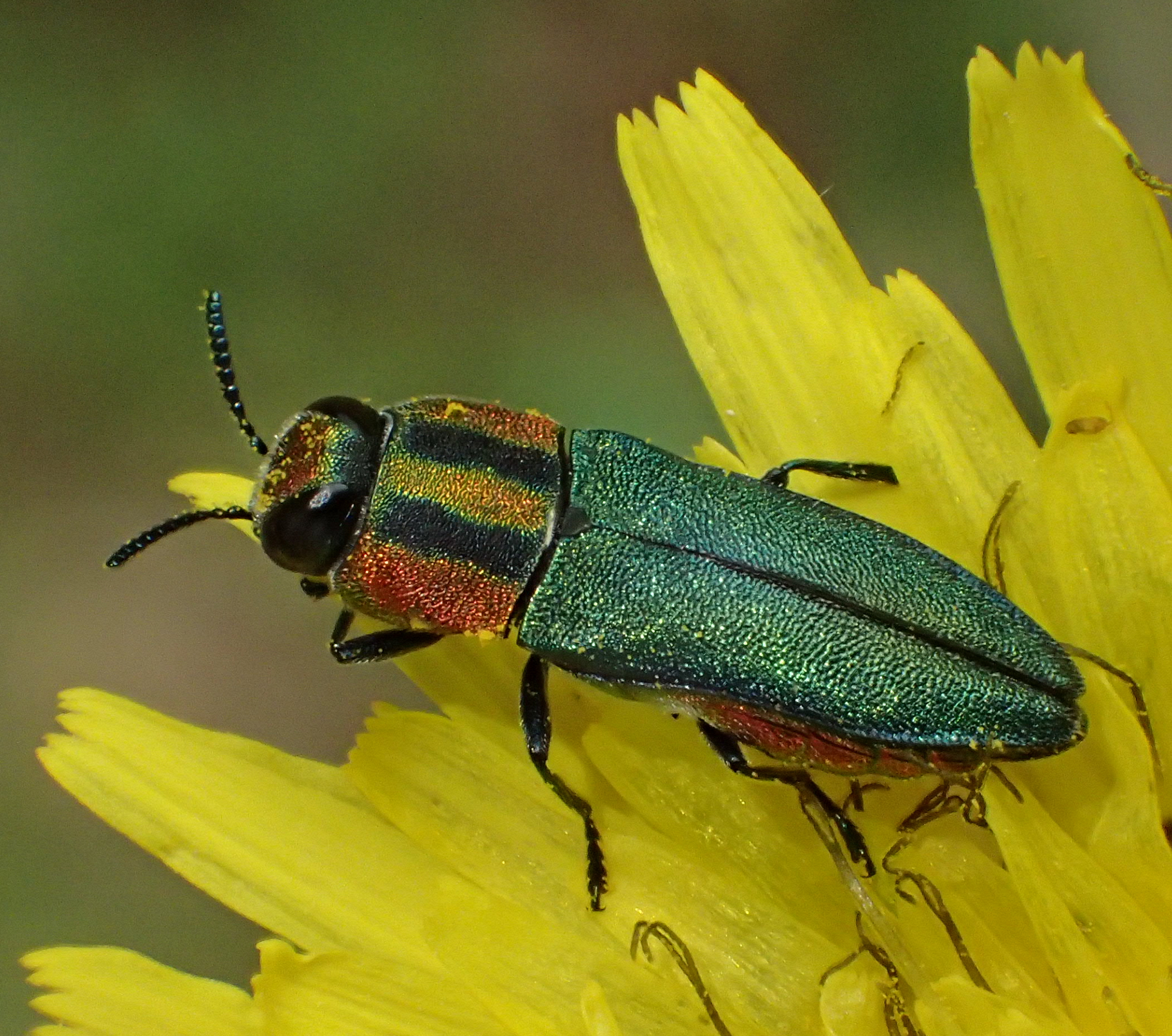

Scientific classification
- Kingdom: Animalia
- Phylum: Arthropoda
- Class: Insecta
- Order: Coleoptera
- Suborder: Polyphaga
- Infraorder: Elateriformia
- Family: Buprestidae
- Genus: Anthaxia
- Species: A. sponsa

Binomial name
- Anthaxia sponsa (Kiesenwetter, 1857)

= Anthaxia sponsa =

Mediterranean jewel beetle

Anthaxia sponsa is a species of jewel beetle in the Buprestinae subfamily.

== Description ==
The species exhibits sexual dimorphism. Males are metallic green above and below with two black to black-blue longitundinal stripes on the pronotum. Female colouration varies, usually the elytra are also green, while the pronotum is reddish-gold, but has the same black to black-blue longitudinal stripes. The underside is purplish-gold. Hair is inconspicuous, except on the forehead in both sexes.

== Range ==
The species is distributed pontomediterranean. It has been recorded in Turkey, Greece, Israel, Georgia, Bulgaria, Azerbaijan, North Macedonia, Palestine, Iran, Lebanon and Syria.

== Etymology ==
Anthaxia sponsa was caught and first described by Kiesenwetter himself in the surroundings of Athens. The species name sponsa is to be seen in connection with the species name Anthaxia nupta. Sponsa (Lat.), meaning "beloved", "betrothed" or "bride" is essentially a comparison to nupta (Lat.) meaning "bride" or "wife". Kiesenwetter in his publication describes Anthaxia nupta as very similar to Anthaxia sponsa, but less beautifully colored, with a "sculpture" not as defined, and a generally more abraded look.
