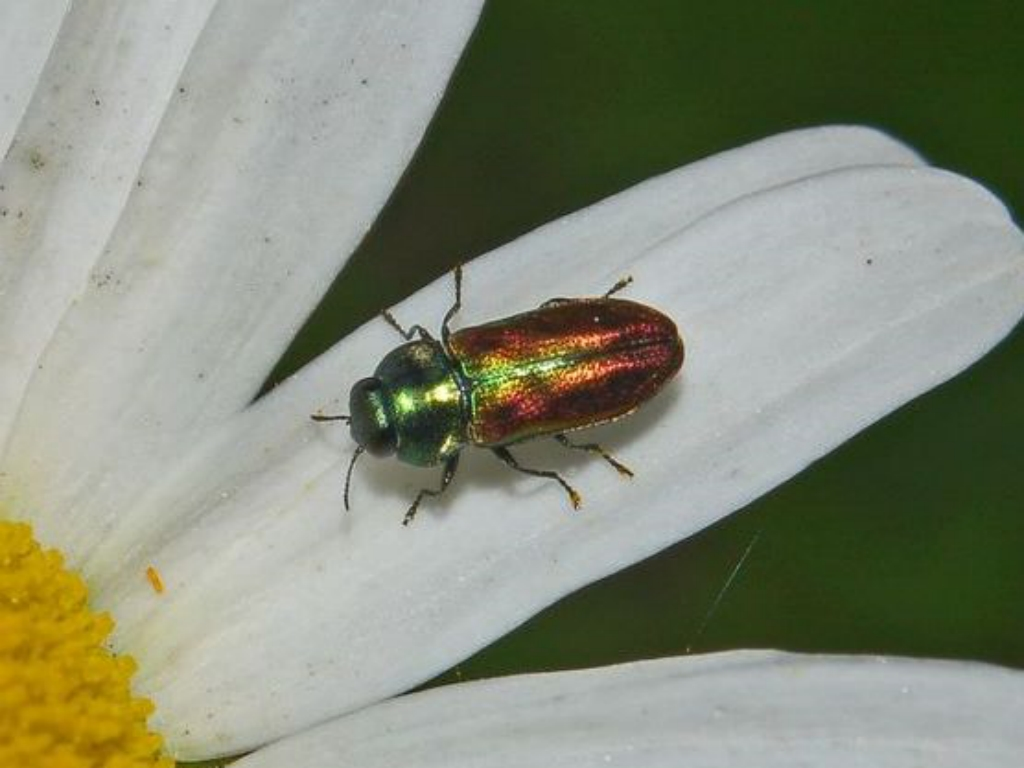
- Female
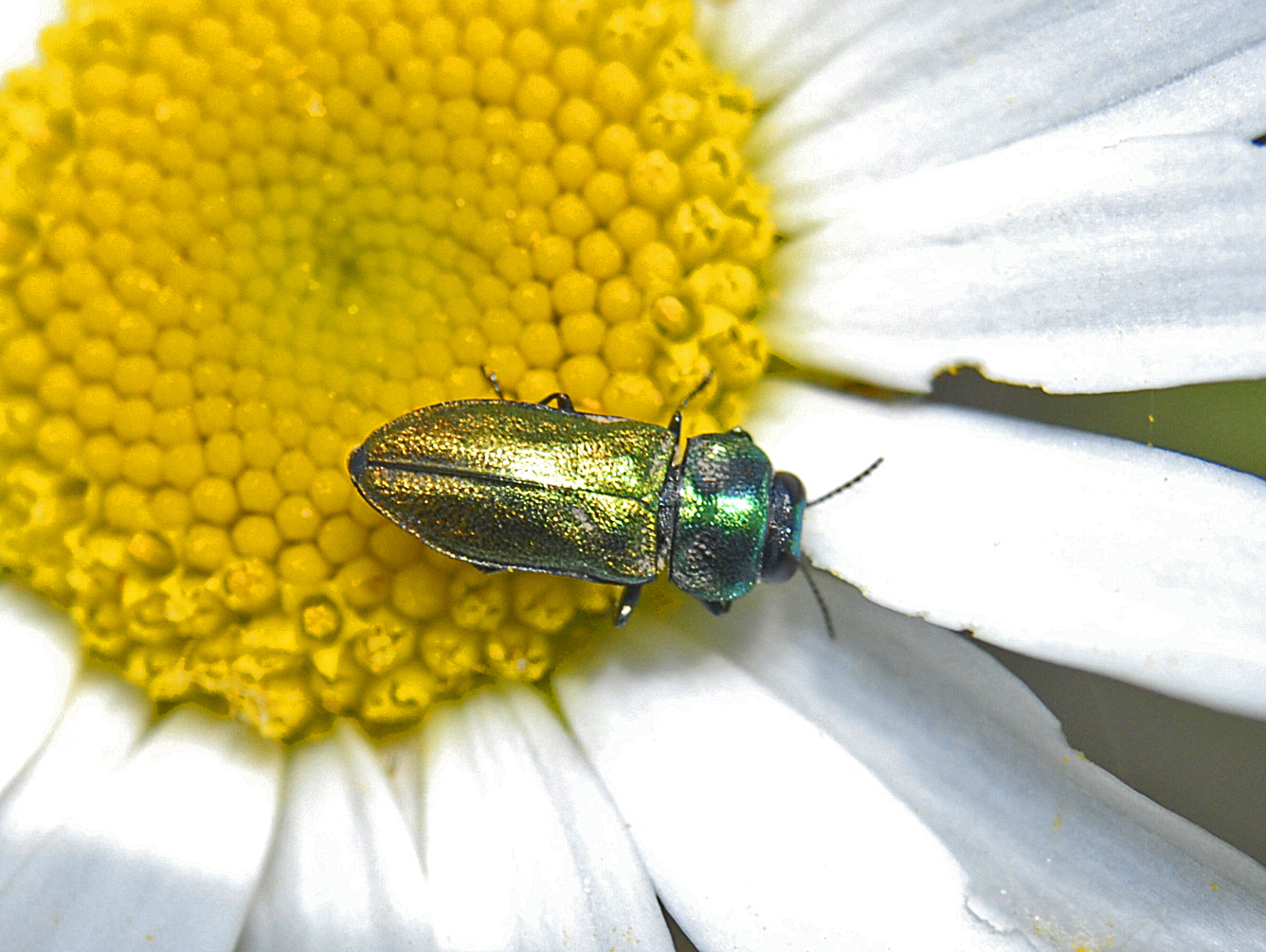
- Male

Scientific classification
- Domain: Eukaryota
- Kingdom: Animalia
- Phylum: Arthropoda
- Class: Insecta
- Order: Coleoptera
- Suborder: Polyphaga
- Infraorder: Elateriformia
- Family: Buprestidae
- Genus: Anthaxia
- Species: A. thalassophila

Binomial name
- Anthaxia thalassophila Abeille de Perrin, 1900

= Anthaxia thalassophila =

Species of beetle

Anthaxia thalassophila is a species of jewel beetle belonging to the family Buprestidae, subfamily Buprestinae.

== Subspecies ==
- Anthaxia thalassophila iberica (Cobos, 1986)
- Anthaxia thalassophila pseudokervillei (Niehuis, 1990)
- Anthaxia thalassophila thalassophila (Abeille de Perrin, 1900)

== Description ==
Anthaxia thalassophila can reach a length of 4–6 millimetres (0.16–0.24 in). This species is characterized by the brilliance of its colors: bright green and dark red with metallic reflections in the females, while the males in place of the red present a bright yellow color with a reddish sheen.

== Ecology ==
Main larval host plants are in genus Pistacia, Quercus, Castanea, Fraxinus and Olea. Adults occurs from Aprils to July, especially on daisies.

== Distribution ==
This beetle is present in France, Italy, Greece, Spain, Portugal, Switzerland, former Yugoslavia and Albania.
