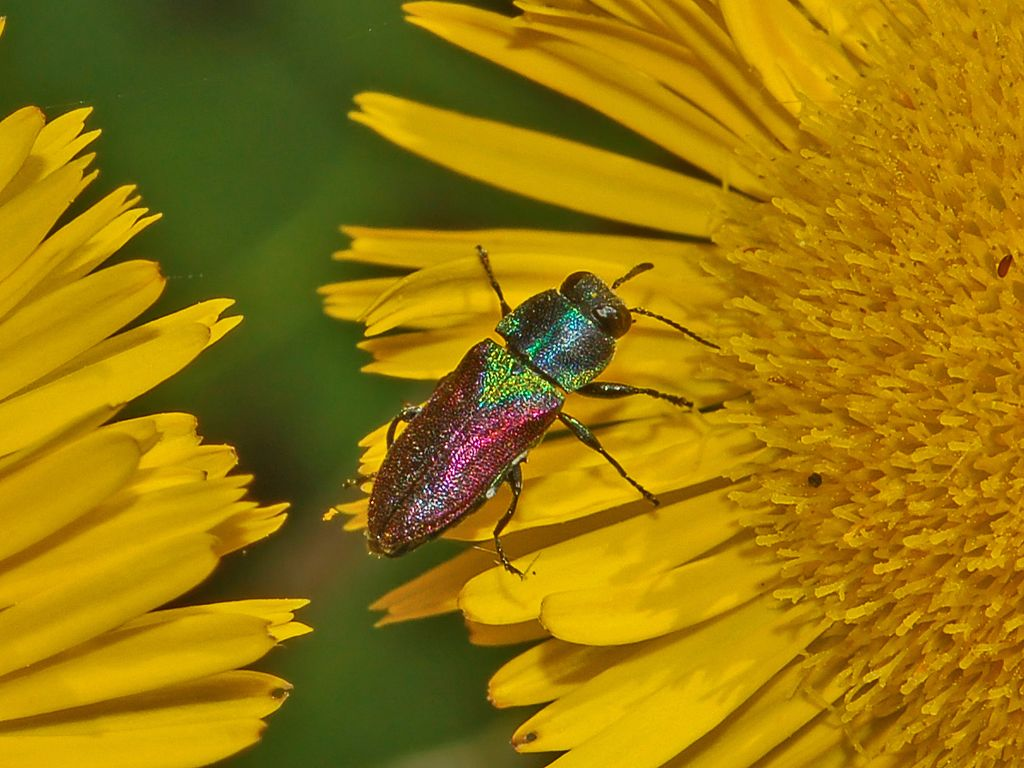
- Male of Anthaxia croesus

Scientific classification
- Kingdom: Animalia
- Phylum: Arthropoda
- Clade: Pancrustacea
- Class: Insecta
- Order: Coleoptera
- Suborder: Polyphaga
- Infraorder: Elateriformia
- Family: Buprestidae
- Genus: Anthaxia
- Species: A. croesus

Binomial name
- Anthaxia croesus Villers, 1789

Synonyms
- Anthaxia ditiscens (Abeille de Perrin, 1872); Buprestis croesus Villers, 1789; Anthaxia scutellaris Géné, 1839; Anthaxia scutellaris semireducta Pic, 1911; Anthaxia viminalis Gory & Laporte, 1839

= Anthaxia croesus =

Species of jewel beetle

Anthaxia croesus is a species of jewel beetle belonging to the family Buprestidae, subfamily Buprestinae.

== Taxonomy ==
A group of specialists (V. Kuban, D. Baiocchi, S. Bíly, T. Kwast and M. Kafka) has ascertained the true identity of the species described by Villers 50 years before the description of Gené, Consequently, this species has to be interpreted as Anthaxia (Haplanthaxia) croesus (de Villers, 1789) = Anthaxia (Haplanthaxia) scutellaris Gené, 1839. The latter epithet passed to junior synonym.

== Subspecies ==
Subspecies include:

- Anthaxia croesus atlasica Théry, 1930
- Anthaxia croesus croesus (Villers, 1789

== Distribution and habitat ==
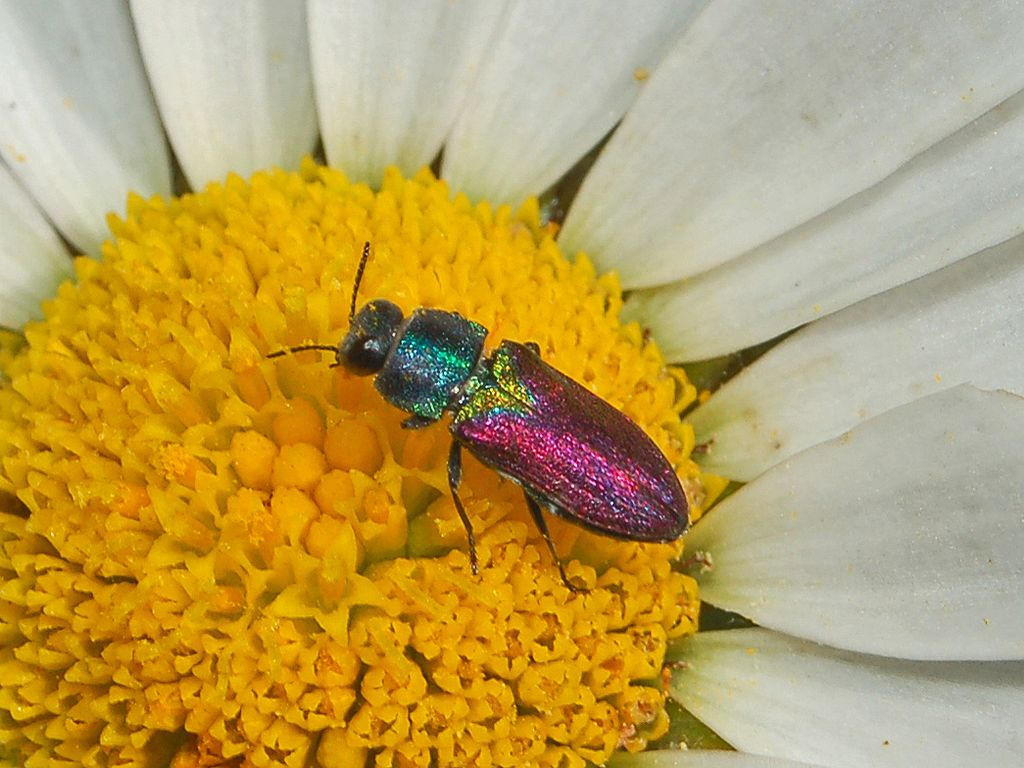
Anthaxia croesus

This beetle is present in Albania, Croatia, France, Italy, Greece, Portugal, Spain and in North Africa (Morocco). It occurs on meadows, pastures and riparian forests.

== Description ==
The adults of Anthaxia croesus can reach a length of about 5–6 mm. Their body shows metallic blue, green and purple colours.

== Biology ==
Adults can be encountered from April through July, lying above the daisies, but also on flowers of Umbelliferae and other flowers. The larva is polyphagous and lives at the expense of several shrubs and trees. Main larval host plants are in the genera Arbutus, Ceratonia, Cornus, Juniperus, Malus, Pinus, Pistacia, Prunus, Pyrus, Quercus, Salix and Spartium.
