= Afromelittia natalensis =

Scientific classification
- Domain: Eukaryota
- Kingdom: Animalia
- Phylum: Arthropoda
- Class: Insecta
- Order: Lepidoptera
- Family: Sesiidae
- Genus: Afromelittia
- Species: A. natalensis

Binomial name
- Afromelittia natalensis (Butler, 1874)

Synonyms
- Melittia natalensis Butler, 1874

Species of moth

Afromelittia natalensis is a moth of the family Sesiidae. It is known from South Africa.
