= Anthaxia inornata =

Scientific classification
- Kingdom: Animalia
- Phylum: Arthropoda
- Class: Insecta
- Order: Coleoptera
- Suborder: Polyphaga
- Infraorder: Elateriformia
- Family: Buprestidae
- Genus: Anthaxia
- Species: A. inornata

Binomial name
- Anthaxia inornata (Randall, 1838)

Species of beetle

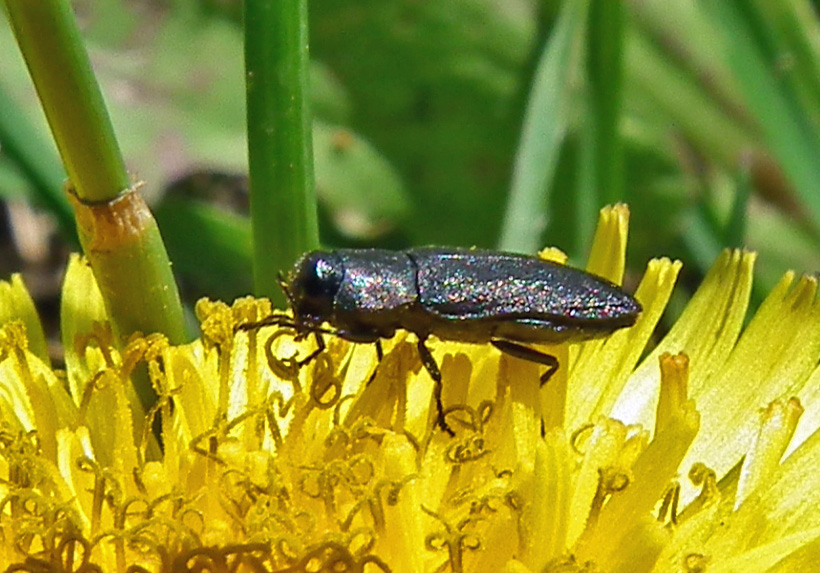
Anthaxia inornata beetle in British Columbia, Canada

Anthaxia inornata is a species of metallic wood-boring beetle in the family Buprestidae, found in North America. It was described by Randall in 1838. The beetle measures 4-8 mm in size.
