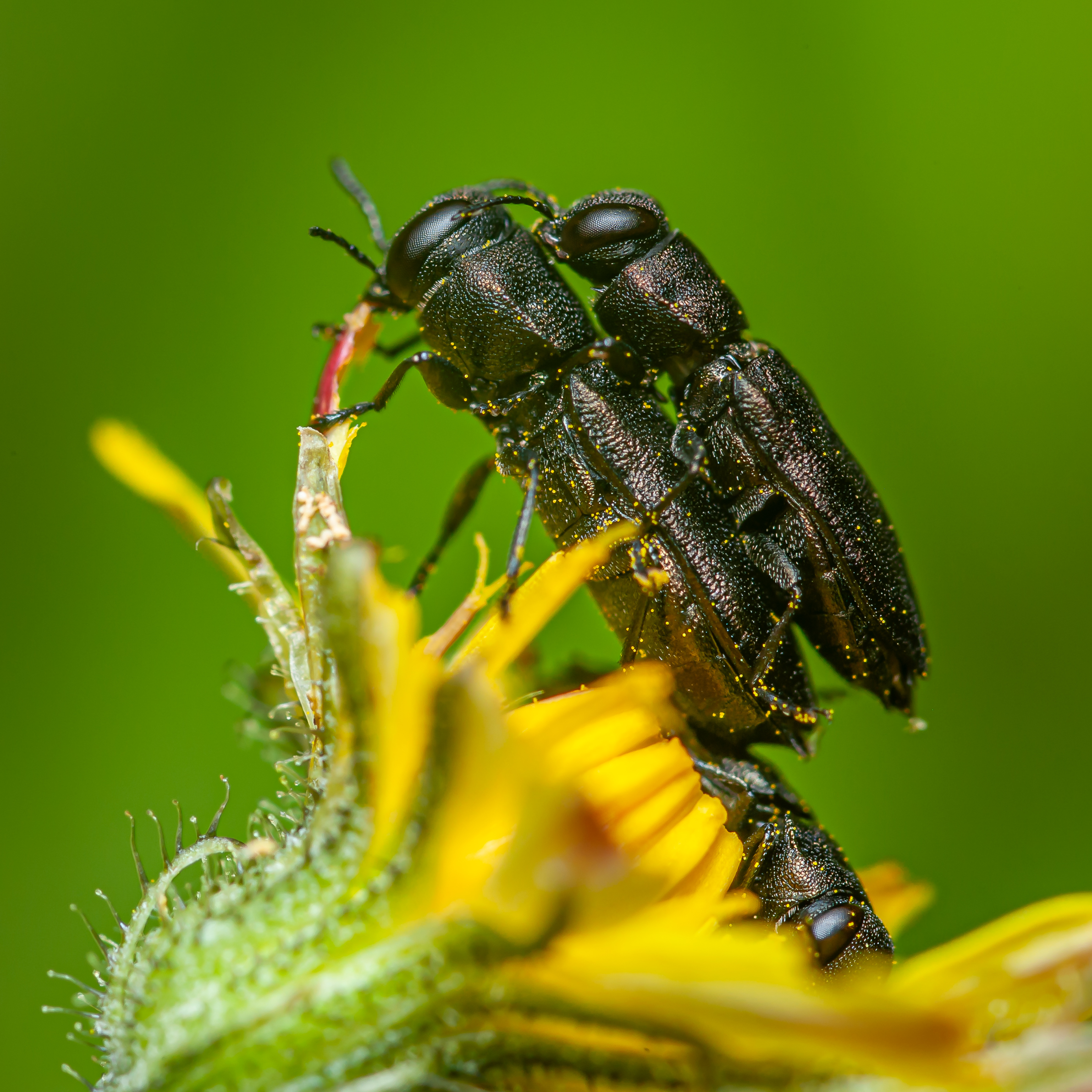
- Mating Anthaxia quadripunctata

Scientific classification
- Kingdom: Animalia
- Phylum: Arthropoda
- Class: Insecta
- Order: Coleoptera
- Suborder: Polyphaga
- Infraorder: Elateriformia
- Family: Buprestidae
- Genus: Anthaxia
- Species: A. quadripunctata

Binomial name
- Anthaxia quadripunctata (Linnaeus, 1758)

Synonyms
- Melanthaxia quadripunctata

= Anthaxia quadripunctata =

Species of beetle

Anthaxia quadripunctata, the metallic wood-boring beetle, is a species of beetle belonging to the family Buprestidae, subfamily Buprestinae.

== Subspecies ==
- Anthaxia quadripunctata attavistica Obenberger, 1918
- Anthaxia quadripunctata quadripunctata (Linnaeus, 1758)

== Description ==
Anthaxia quadripunctata in copula

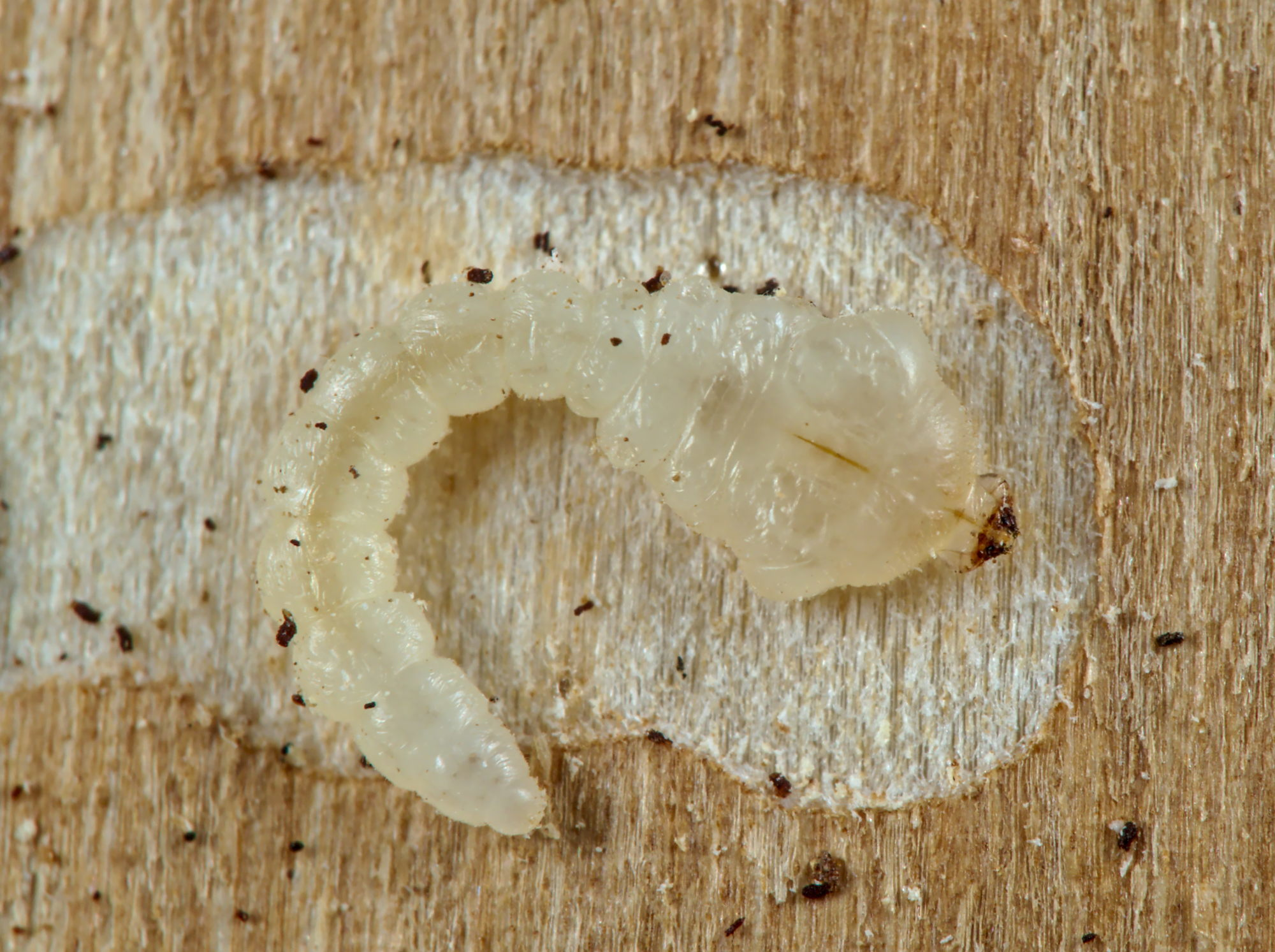
Anthaxia quadripunctata larva

Anthaxia quadripunctata can reach a length of 4.5 and 8 millimetres (0.18 and 0.31 in). The basic color is black or dark brown with a copper shine. The elytra and pronotum are grainy. Pronotum is almost rectangular and usually shows a row of four small dimples (hence the Latin name quadripunctata, meaning with four points).

Adults fly from April to September feeding on pollen of several Asteraceae and prefer white and yellow flowers, where frequently many of them are mating. Larvae are polyphagous wood borers, living just under the bark of sick or dead coniferous trees. Main larval host plants are in genus Picea, Abies, Juniperus, Larix and Pinus.

== Distribution ==
This beetle is present in most of Europe, the eastern Palearctic realm, the Caucasus, Asia Minor, the Near East, and North Africa.

== Habitat ==
They live in mountain areas with coniferous trees, especially in the forest edges.
