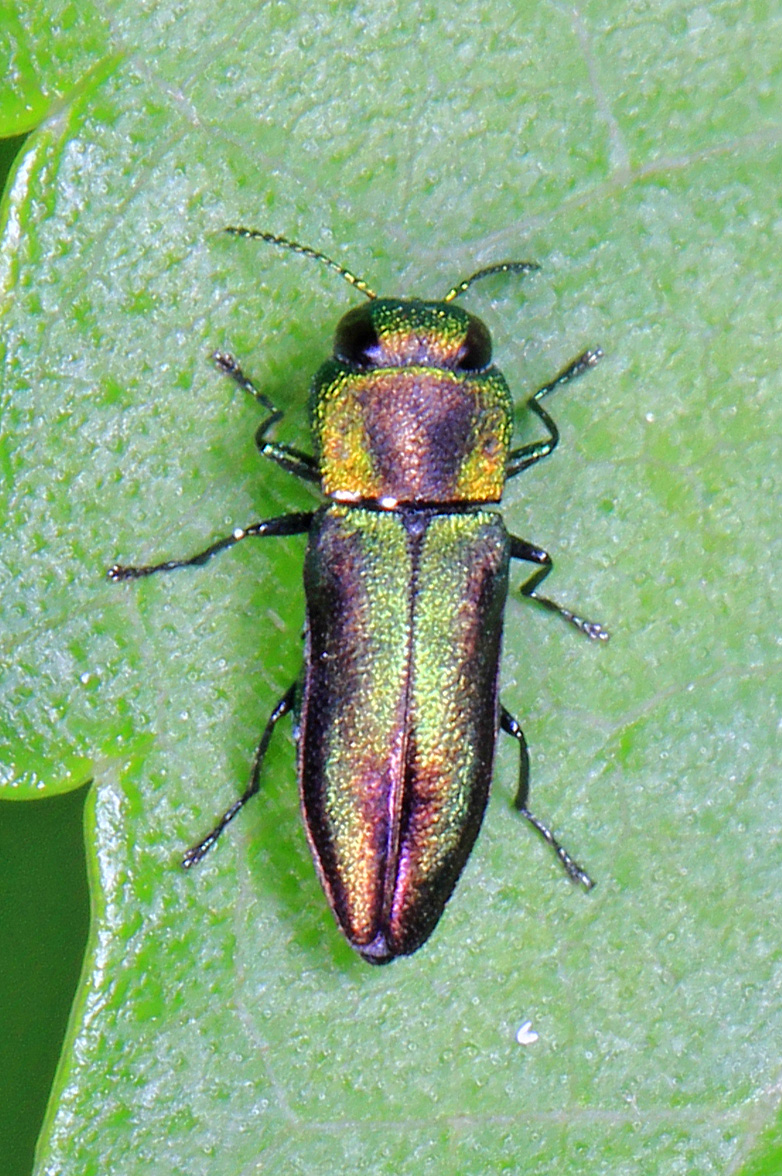

Scientific classification
- Domain: Eukaryota
- Kingdom: Animalia
- Phylum: Arthropoda
- Class: Insecta
- Order: Coleoptera
- Suborder: Polyphaga
- Infraorder: Elateriformia
- Family: Buprestidae
- Genus: Anthaxia
- Species: A. quercata

Binomial name
- Anthaxia quercata (Fabricius, 1801)

Synonyms
- Anthaxia cuneiformis Gory, 1841

= Anthaxia quercata =

Species of beetle

Anthaxia quercata is a species of metallic wood-boring beetle in the family Buprestidae. It is found in North America.
