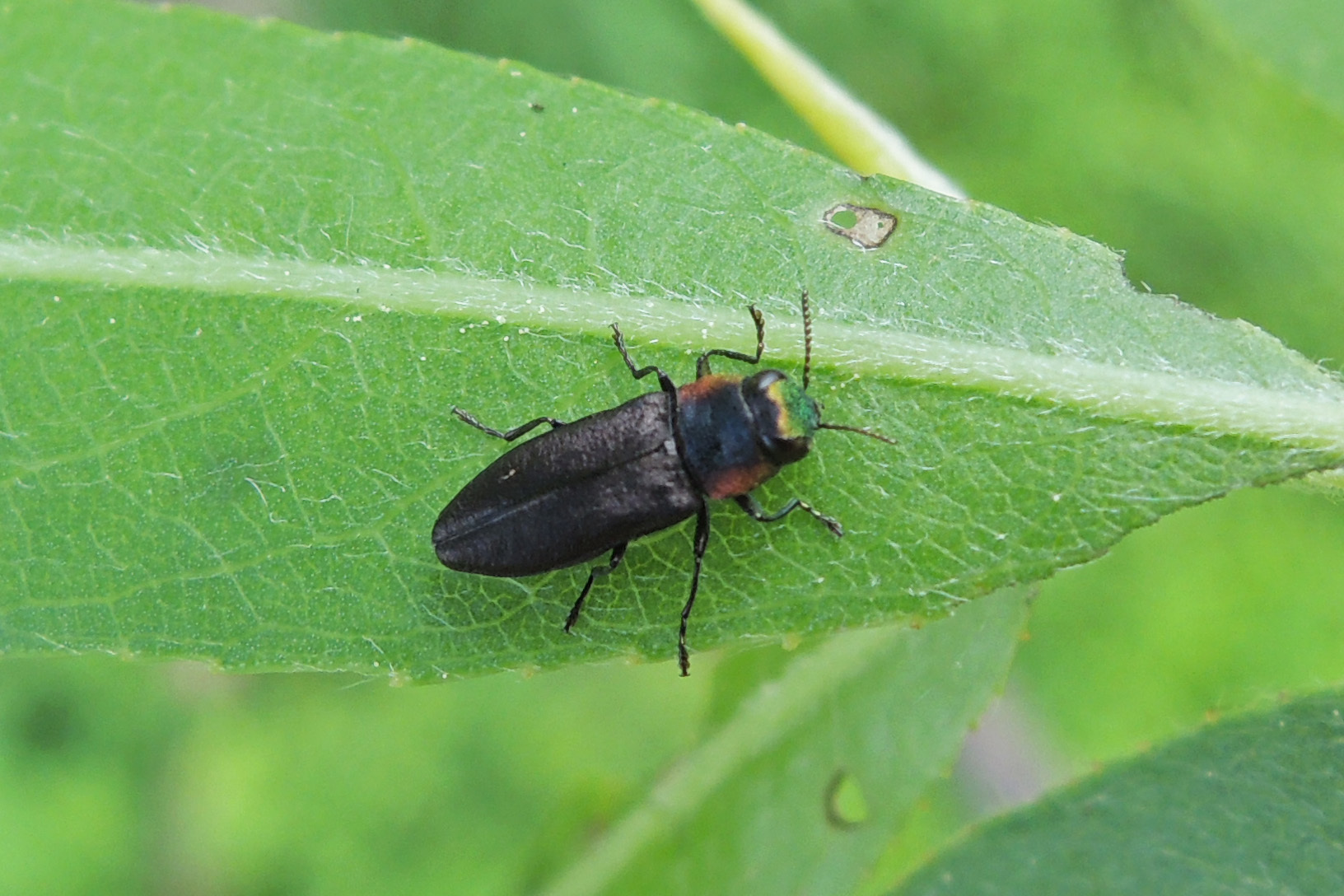

Scientific classification
- Domain: Eukaryota
- Kingdom: Animalia
- Phylum: Arthropoda
- Class: Insecta
- Order: Coleoptera
- Suborder: Polyphaga
- Infraorder: Elateriformia
- Family: Buprestidae
- Genus: Anthaxia
- Species: A. viridicornis

Binomial name
- Anthaxia viridicornis (Say, 1823)

= Anthaxia viridicornis =

Species of beetle

Anthaxia viridicornis is a species of metallic wood-boring beetle in the family Buprestidae. It is found in North America.
