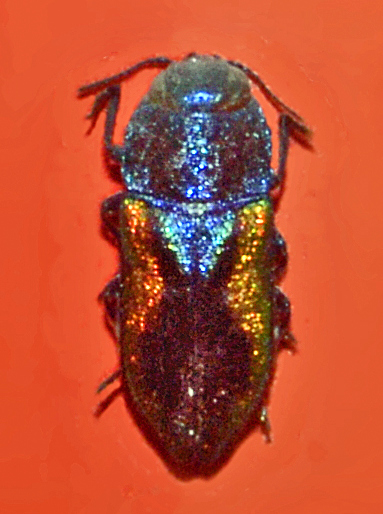
- Anthaxia lucens. Museum specimen

Scientific classification
- Domain: Eukaryota
- Kingdom: Animalia
- Phylum: Arthropoda
- Class: Insecta
- Order: Coleoptera
- Suborder: Polyphaga
- Infraorder: Elateriformia
- Family: Buprestidae
- Genus: Anthaxia
- Species: A. lucens

Binomial name
- Anthaxia lucens Küster, 1852

= Anthaxia lucens =

Species of beetle

Anthaxia lucens is a species of jewel beetle belonging to the family Buprestidae, subfamily Buprestinae.

== Subspecies ==
- Anthaxia lucens lucens Küster, 1852
- Anthaxia lucens phoenica Ganglbauer, 1882

== Description ==
Anthaxia lucens can reach a length of 6–8 millimetres (0.24–0.31 in). This species has a bright elytral coloration, with longitudinal orange stripes on a metallic bluish-black background. Male's metatibiae are almost straight. Larvae feed on Prunus domestica, Armeniaca vulgaris and Prunus cerasus.

== Distribution ==
This species is present in the East Palearctic ecozone, in Albania, Crete, Croatia, Greece, Italy, Montenegro and Turkey.
