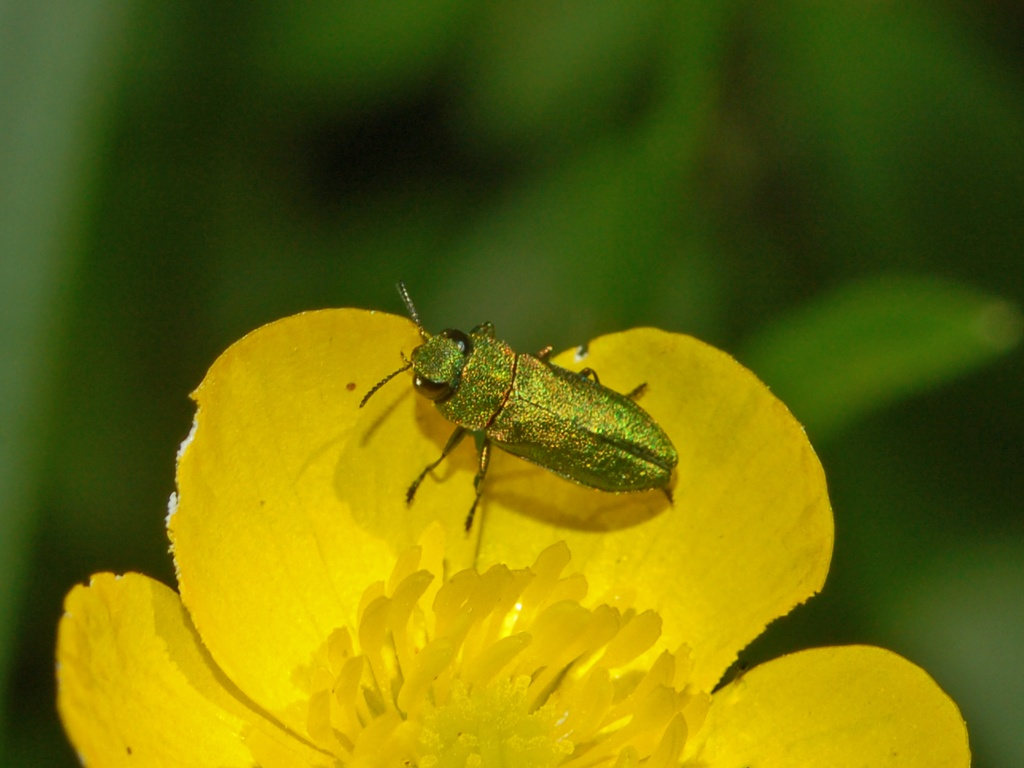

Scientific classification
- Kingdom: Animalia
- Phylum: Arthropoda
- Class: Insecta
- Order: Coleoptera
- Suborder: Polyphaga
- Infraorder: Elateriformia
- Family: Buprestidae
- Genus: Anthaxia
- Species: A. nitidula

Binomial name
- Anthaxia nitidula (Linnaeus, 1758)

Synonyms
- Anthaxia agnusi (Mequignon, 1927); Anthaxia canipennis (Gory, 1841); Anthaxia grabowskyi (Obenberger, 1912); Anthaxia lichacevi (Obenberger, 1930); Anthaxia millefolii (Abeille de Perrin, 1894); Buprestis laeta (Schaeffer, 1766); Buprestis styria (Voet, 1806)

= Anthaxia nitidula =

Species of beetle

Anthaxia nitidula is a species of jewel beetles belonging to the family Buprestidae, subfamily Buprestinae.

== Description ==
The adults are 5–7 millimetres (0.20–0.28 in) long. and are pollinators. The male is completely metallic green, while the head and pronotum in the female are red and elytra are green. Main host plants of the wood-boring larvae are in the genera Amygdalus, Crataegus and Prunus.

== Distribution ==
This beetle is present in most of Europe, in the eastern Palearctic realm, in the Near East, and in North Africa.

== Subspecies ==
- Anthaxia nitidula nitidula (Linnaeus, 1758)
- Anthaxia nitidula signaticollis (Krynicky, 1832)

== Gallery ==
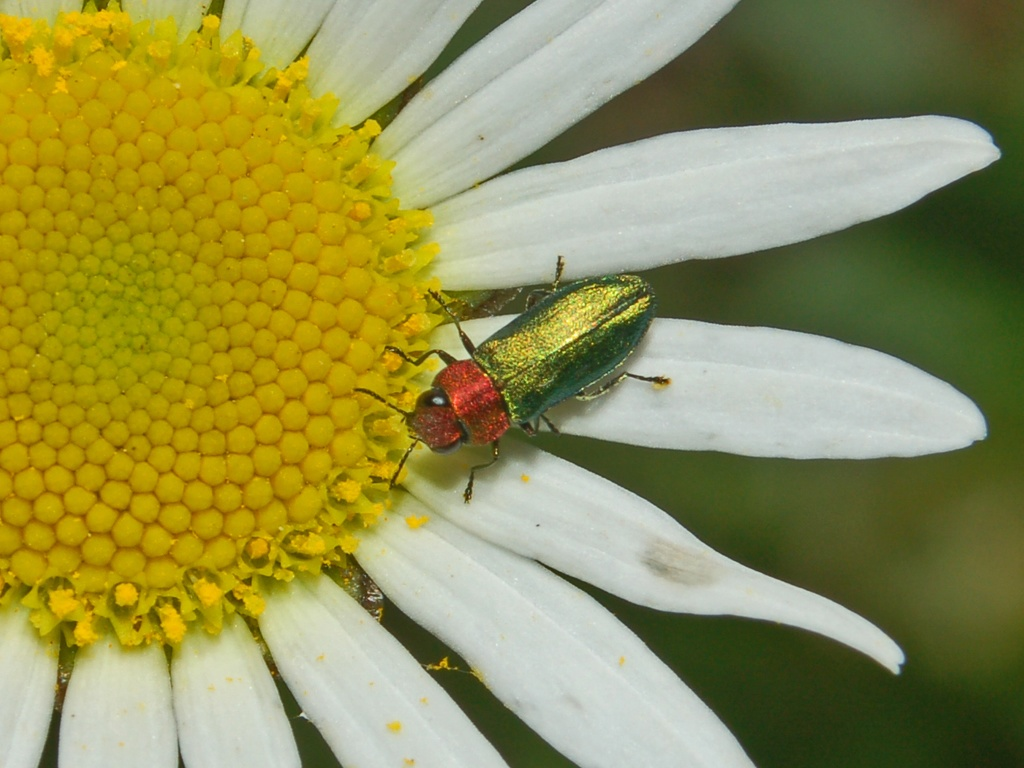
Female
