= Afromelittia aenescens =

Scientific classification
- Domain: Eukaryota
- Kingdom: Animalia
- Phylum: Arthropoda
- Class: Insecta
- Order: Lepidoptera
- Family: Sesiidae
- Genus: Afromelittia
- Species: A. aenescens

Binomial name
- Afromelittia aenescens (Butler, 1896)

Synonyms
- Melittia aenescens Butler, 1896

Species of moth

Afromelittia aenescens is a moth of the family Sesiidae. It is known from Malawi, Zambia, Kenya and Mozambique.
