= Abacetus aenescens =

Scientific classification
- Domain: Eukaryota
- Kingdom: Animalia
- Phylum: Arthropoda
- Class: Insecta
- Order: Coleoptera
- Suborder: Adephaga
- Family: Carabidae
- Genus: Abacetus
- Species: A. aenescens

Binomial name
- Abacetus aenescens Peringuey, 1896

Species of beetle

Abacetus aenescens is a species of ground beetle in the subfamily Pterostichinae. It was described by Peringuey in 1896 and is endemic to South Africa.
