= Anthaxia aenescens =

Scientific classification
- Kingdom: Animalia
- Phylum: Arthropoda
- Class: Insecta
- Order: Coleoptera
- Suborder: Polyphaga
- Infraorder: Elateriformia
- Family: Buprestidae
- Genus: Anthaxia
- Species: A. aenescens

Binomial name
- Anthaxia aenescens Casey, 1884

Species of beetle

Anthaxia aenescens is a species of metallic wood-boring beetle in the family Buprestidae. It is found in North America.
