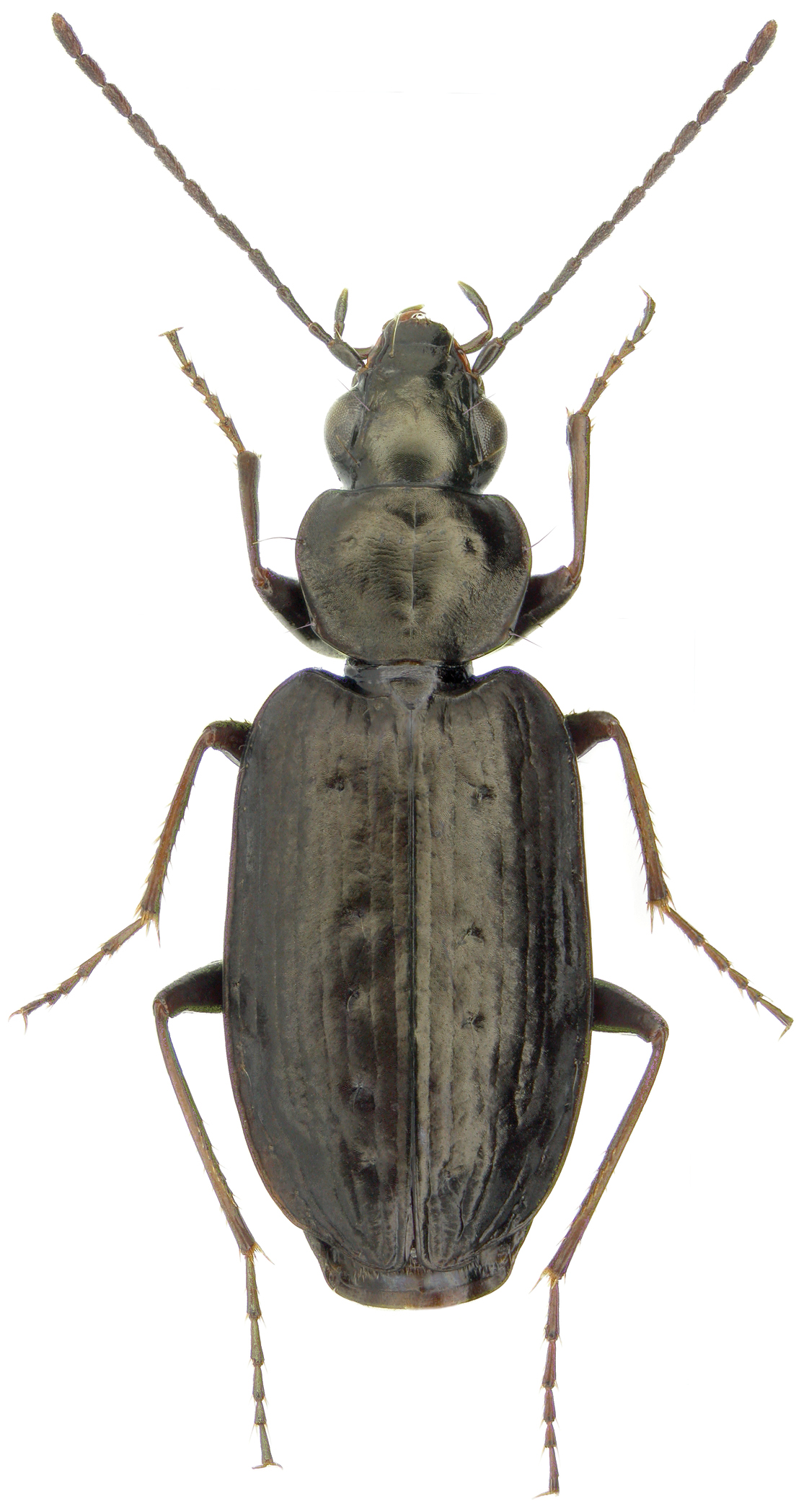

Scientific classification
- Kingdom: Animalia
- Phylum: Arthropoda
- Class: Insecta
- Order: Coleoptera
- Suborder: Adephaga
- Family: Carabidae
- Genus: Sericoda
- Species: S. quadripunctata

Binomial name
- Sericoda quadripunctata (De Geer, 1774)

= Sericoda quadripunctata =

Species of beetle

Sericoda quadripunctata is a species of ground beetle in the family Carabidae. It is found in Europe and Northern Asia (excluding China) and North America.

== Biology ==
S. quadripunctata is pyrophilic and can be extremely abundant in areas that have recently experienced wildfires. The eggs of S. quadripunctata have a higher rate of survival in recently heat-sterilized soil, mainly due to reduced predation by other soil-dwelling invertebrates.

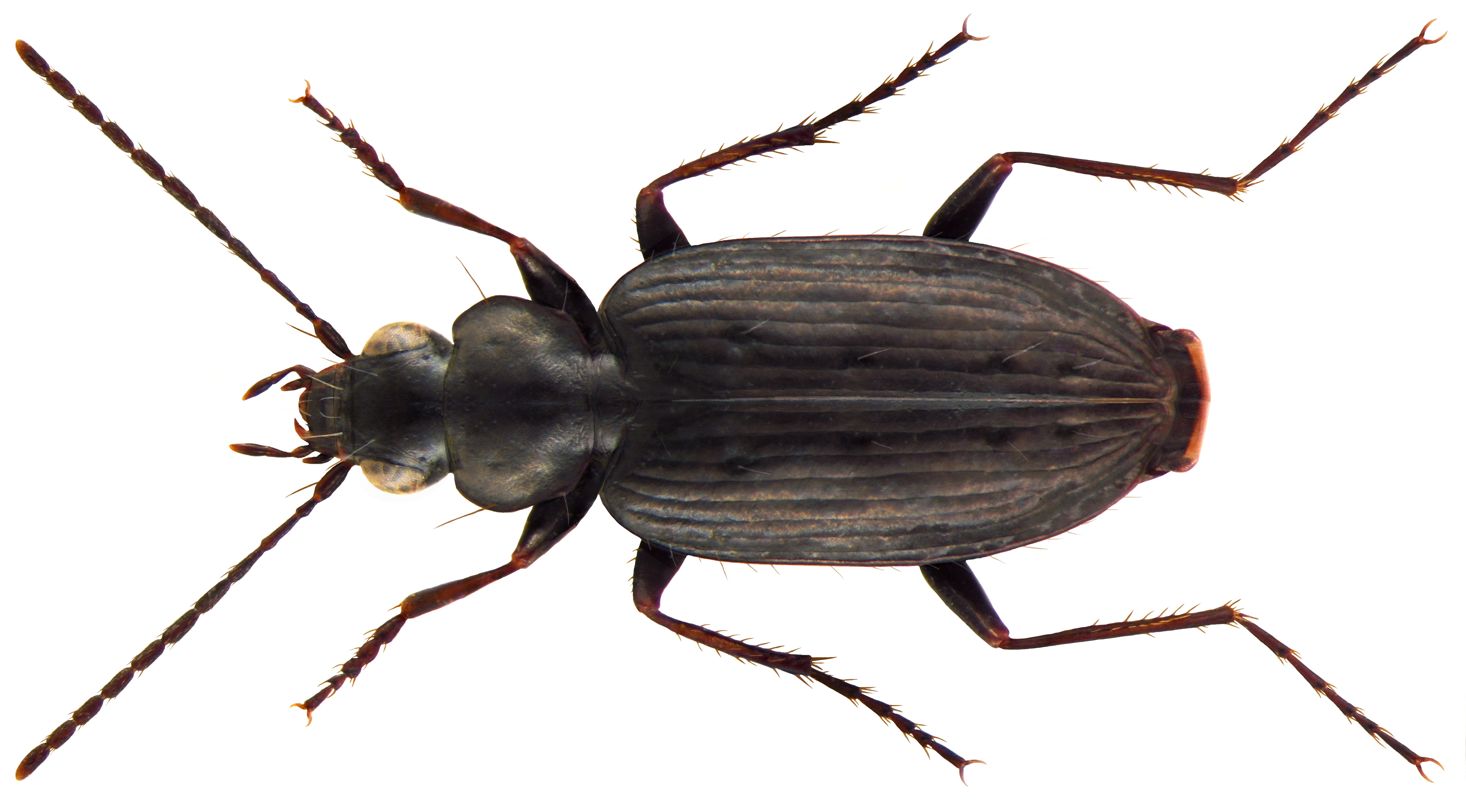
