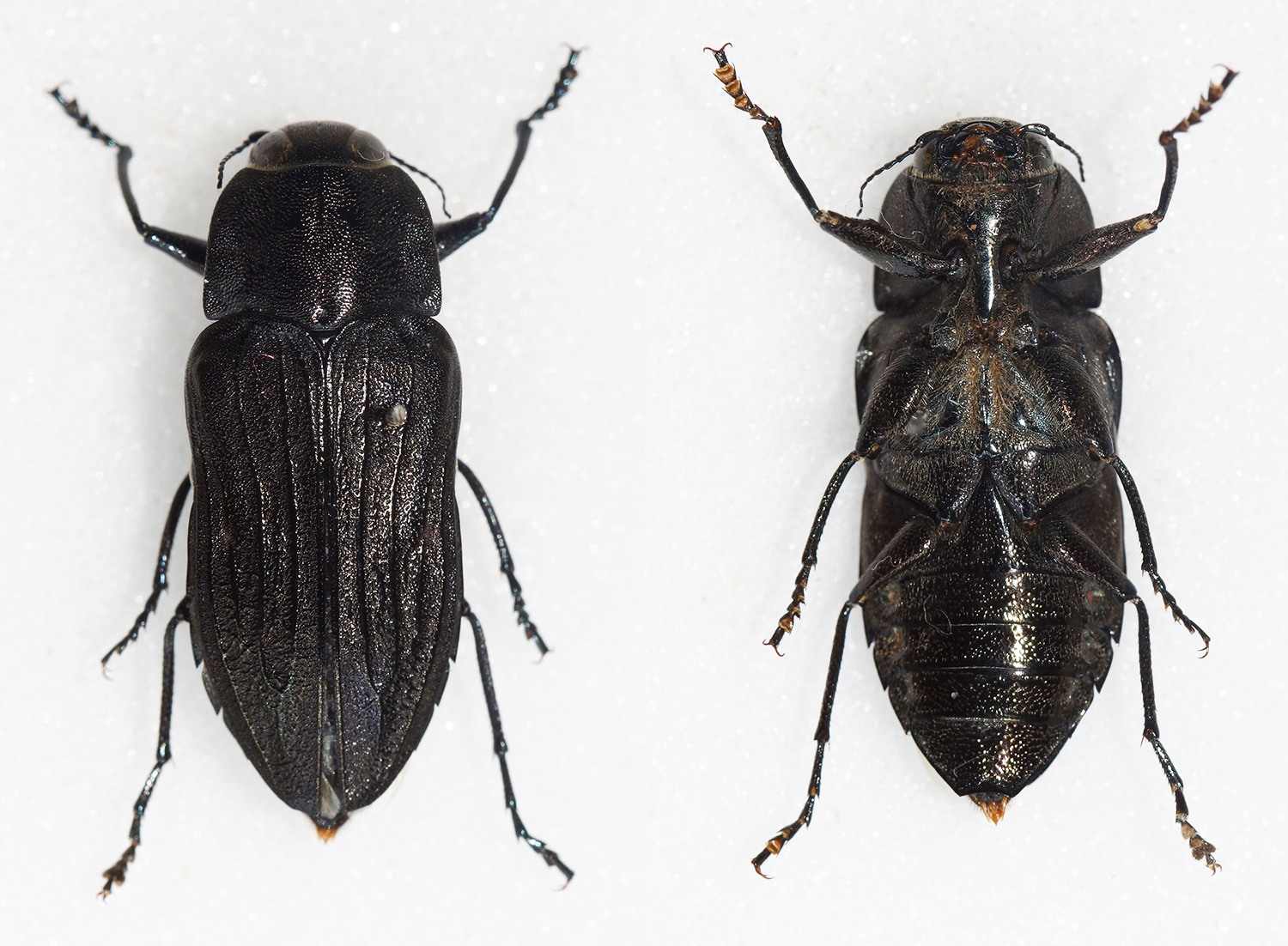

Scientific classification
- Kingdom: Animalia
- Phylum: Arthropoda
- Class: Insecta
- Order: Coleoptera
- Suborder: Polyphaga
- Infraorder: Elateriformia
- Family: Buprestidae
- Tribe: Melanophilini
- Genus: Merimna; Saunders, 1868
- Species: M. atrata

Binomial name
- Merimna atrata (Gory & Laporte, 1837)

= Merimna =

Merimna atrata

Genus of beetles

Merimna atrata is a species of beetle in the family Buprestidae, family Buprestinae, tribe Melanophilini and is the only species in the genus Merimna. It is native to Australia. It is a pyrophilic species, preferentially laying its eggs in recently burned wood. Its body has infrared sensors which allows it to avoid landing on burning hot surfaces.
