= Pyrophile =

Insect which relies on fire ecology

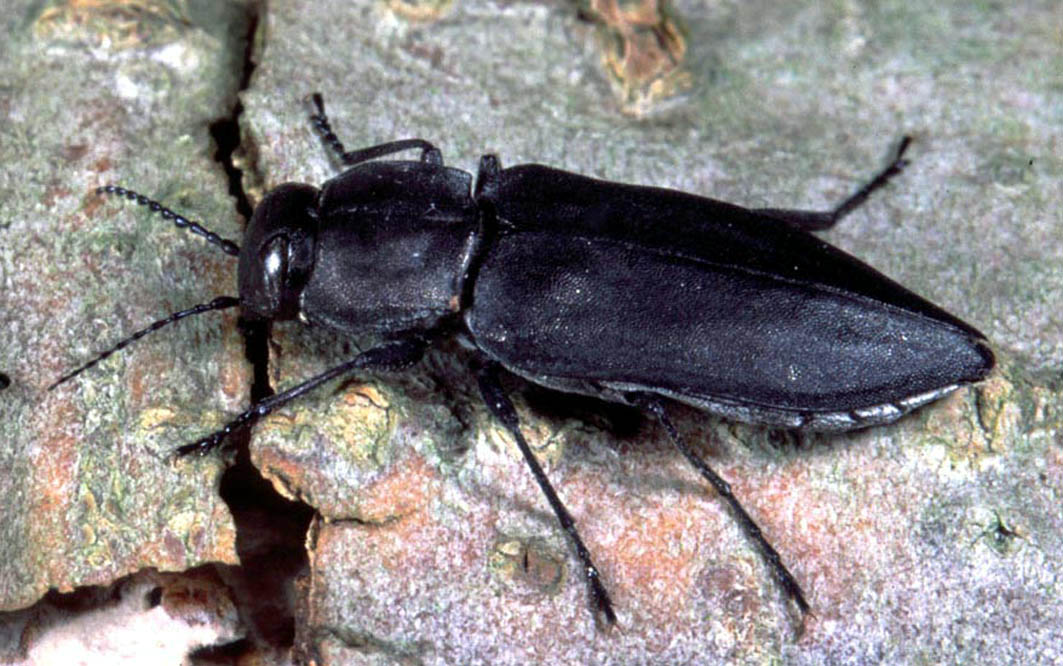
Beetles in the genus Melanophila, such as Melanophila acuminata, are commonly known as fire beetles due to their pyrophilic habits.

A pyrophile or pyrophilic/pyrophilous insect is an insect which has evolved to rely upon fire ecology for important parts of their life cycle. Pyrophiles usually occur alongside and co-evolve with pyrophytes, the plant analog of a pyrophilic insect - those plants which rely upon natural fires as part of their lifecycle.

These insects have evolved the ability to rapidly colonize environments after a wildfire. Specialized olfactory organs sensitive to smoke and burnt plant volatiles guide adult insects to active wildfire sites, while in some species highly sensitive thermal infrared receptors help them steer towards recently burned spots and avoid the dangers of actively burning areas. These infrared receptors are only known in insects from pyrophilous species and are thought to have evolved independently in at least four different genera. Many pyrophiles are somewhat to exceedingly rare outside of burn sites but become locally abundant within as little as hours after the start of a wildfire. Peak abundance may occur in the first one to two days of a fire, while it is still active, with numbers rapidly decreasing after a fire is extinguished.

A pyrophilic lifestyle is extraordinarily uncommon amongst insects; of the over 1 million known insect species, only 0.005% are known to have a pyrophilous lifestyle. These include at least 30 species of beetles, 10 species of flies, 8 species of true bugs, and 1 species of moth. Flies of the genus Microsania are some of the most numerous and well-described pyrophilic insects. Others include buprestid beetles in the genera Melanophila and Merimna, ground beetles in the genus Sericoda, the cleroid beetle Acanthocnemus nigricans, and some species of flat bugs in the genus Aradus.

Little is known about the broader ecosystem impacts and specific ecological interactions of pyrophilic insects. Various hypotheses attribute these insects' fire-loving adaptations as owing to the weakening of host plants creating greater food availability, the sterilization of the medium into which eggs are laid, and the elimination of competitive or predatory organisms.

== Relationship with Humans ==
The European fire beetle Melanophila cuspidata has been used as an information filter to select which fire-released plant volatiles to target in the development of chemical sensors for early-warning fire alert systems in wood processing.
