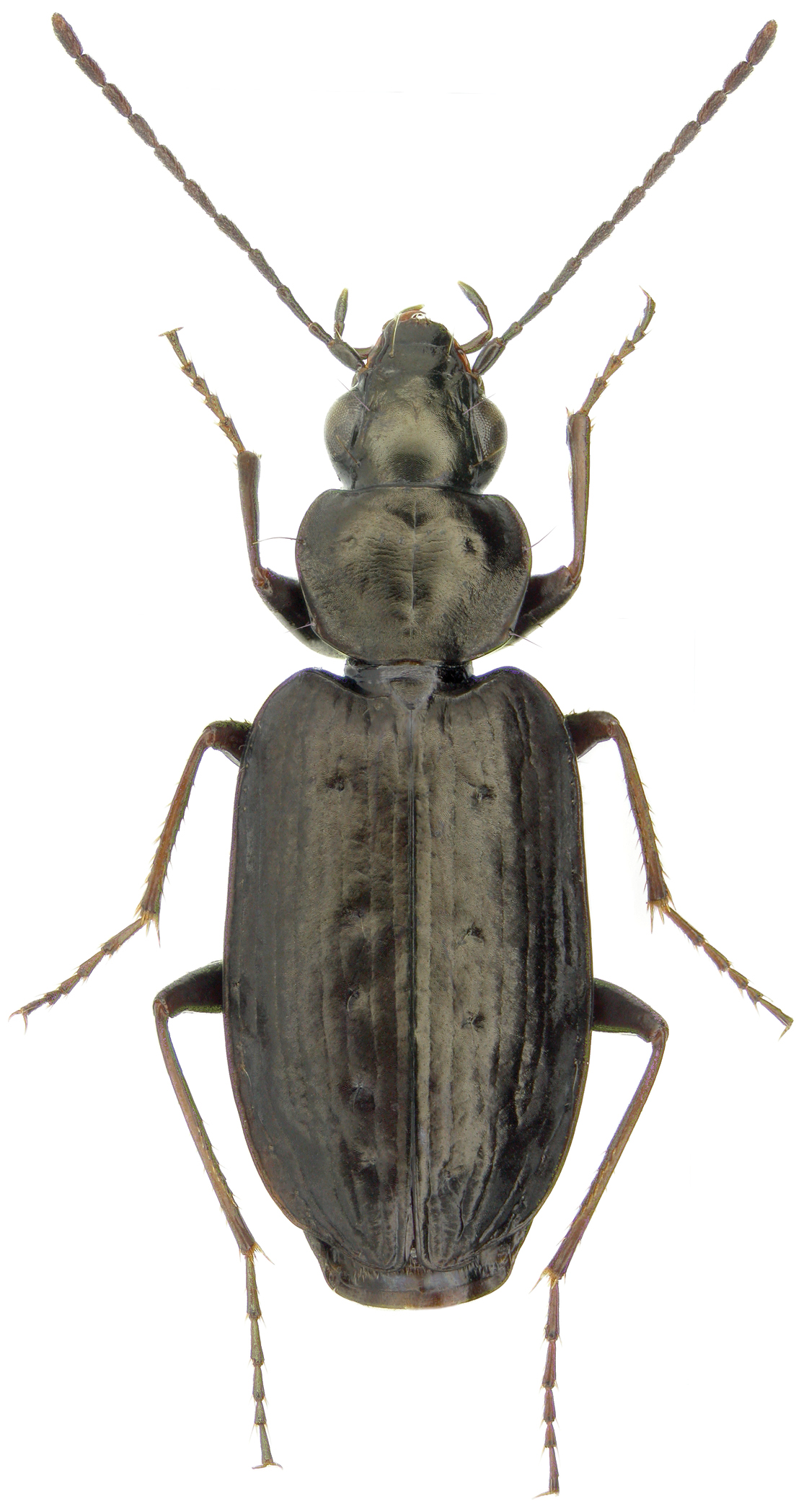
- Sericoda quadripunctata

Scientific classification
- Domain: Eukaryota
- Kingdom: Animalia
- Phylum: Arthropoda
- Class: Insecta
- Order: Coleoptera
- Suborder: Adephaga
- Family: Carabidae
- Tribe: Platynini
- Genus: Sericoda; Kirby, 1837

= Sericoda =

Genus of beetles

Sericoda is a genus of harpaline ground beetles. They are native to the Holarctic. Their habit resembles some members of the related genus Agonum, but they are generally smaller. The origin of Sericoda is apparently North America, with the Central American genus Elliptoleus the closest living relative.

Sericoda beetles are pyrophilous, meaning that they are attracted by burned areas after forest fires. This means they are found in large numbers the summer following the fires, after which their numbers decrease again.

Species include:

- Sericoda balli J.Schmidt, 2008
- Sericoda bembidioides Kirby, 1837
- Sericoda bogemannii (Gyllenhal, 1813)
- Sericoda ceylonica (Motschulsky, 1859)
- Sericoda lissoptera (Chaudoir, 1854)
- Sericoda montana Liebherr, 1991
- Sericoda obsoleta (Say, 1823)
- Sericoda quadripunctata (Degeer, 1774)
