= Juniperella =

Juniperella mirabilis

Scientific classification
- Kingdom: Animalia
- Phylum: Arthropoda
- Class: Insecta
- Order: Coleoptera
- Suborder: Polyphaga
- Infraorder: Elateriformia
- Family: Buprestidae
- Genus: Juniperella; Knull, 1947
- Species: J. mirabilis

Binomial name
- Juniperella mirabilis Knull, 1947

Genus of beetles

Juniperella mirabilis is a species of beetle in the family Buprestidae, subfamily Buprestinae and tribe Melanophilini the only species in the genus Juniperella.
