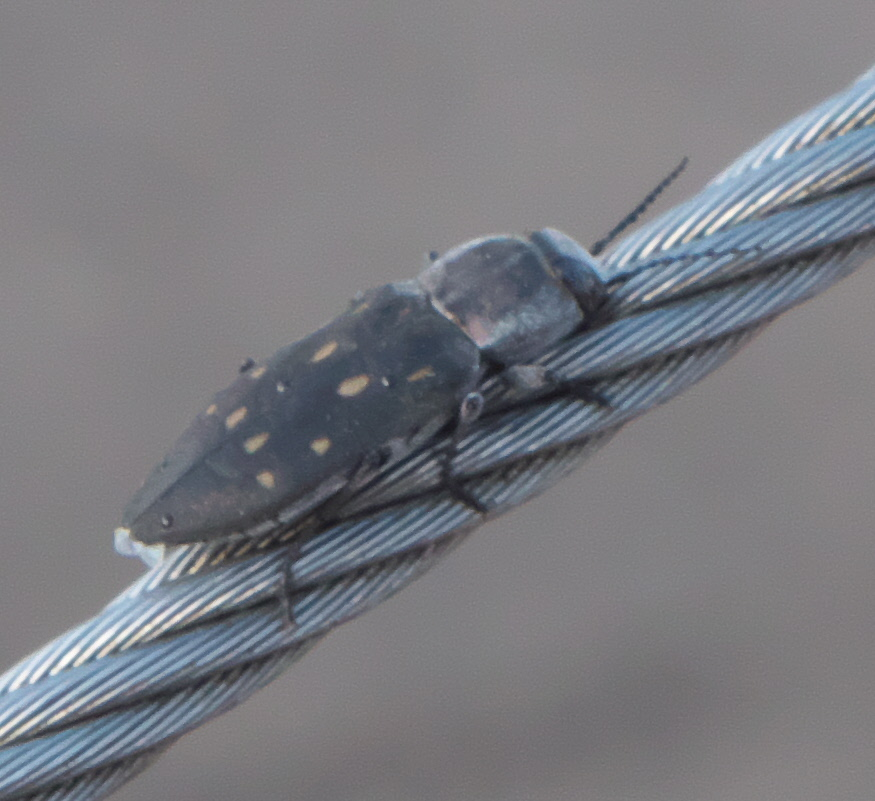

Scientific classification
- Domain: Eukaryota
- Kingdom: Animalia
- Phylum: Arthropoda
- Class: Insecta
- Order: Coleoptera
- Suborder: Polyphaga
- Infraorder: Elateriformia
- Family: Buprestidae
- Genus: Melanophila
- Species: M. consputa

Binomial name
- Melanophila consputa LeConte, 1857

= Melanophila consputa =

Species of beetle

Melanophila consputa, the charcoal beetle, is a species of metallic wood-boring beetle in the family Buprestidae. It is found in Central America, North America, and Oceania. Like other members of their genus, charcoal beetles are drawn to forest fires, which they find using sensors near their legs that detect infrared radiation. Female charcoal beetles then lay their eggs in the charred remains of coniferous trees. They have been known to swarm large groups of smokers and bite humans.
