= Phaenops fulvoguttata =

Scientific classification
- Kingdom: Animalia
- Phylum: Arthropoda
- Class: Insecta
- Order: Coleoptera
- Suborder: Polyphaga
- Infraorder: Elateriformia
- Family: Buprestidae
- Genus: Phaenops
- Species: P. fulvoguttata

Binomial name
- Phaenops fulvoguttata (Harris, 1829)

Synonyms
- Phaenops croceosignatus (Laporte and Gory, 1837); Phaenops decoloratus (Laporte and Gory, 1837); Phaenops octospilotus (Laporte and Gory, 1837)

Species of beetle

Phaenops fulvoguttata, the hemlock borer, is a species of metallic wood-boring beetle belonging to the family Buprestidae. It is found in North America.
