= Melanophila notata =

Scientific classification
- Domain: Eukaryota
- Kingdom: Animalia
- Phylum: Arthropoda
- Class: Insecta
- Order: Coleoptera
- Suborder: Polyphaga
- Infraorder: Elateriformia
- Family: Buprestidae
- Genus: Melanophila
- Species: M. notata

Binomial name
- Melanophila notata (Laporte & Gory, 1837)

Synonyms
- Melanophila elegans Sloop, 1937; Melanophila hungarica Csiki, 1905; Melanophila luteosignata Mannerheim, 1837

Species of beetle

Melanophila notata is a species of metallic wood-boring beetle in the family Buprestidae. It is found in the Caribbean Sea, Central America, and North America.
