= Sericoda bogemannii =

Scientific classification
- Kingdom: Animalia
- Phylum: Arthropoda
- Class: Insecta
- Order: Coleoptera
- Suborder: Adephaga
- Family: Carabidae
- Genus: Sericoda
- Species: S. bogemannii

Binomial name
- Sericoda bogemannii (Gyllenhal, 1813)

Synonyms
- Agonum invidiosum (Casey, 1920); Sericoda invidiosa Casey, 1920

Species of beetle

Sericoda bogemannii is a species of ground beetle in the family Carabidae. It is found in North America and Europe.
