= Phaenops abies =

Scientific classification
- Domain: Eukaryota
- Kingdom: Animalia
- Phylum: Arthropoda
- Class: Insecta
- Order: Coleoptera
- Suborder: Polyphaga
- Infraorder: Elateriformia
- Family: Buprestidae
- Genus: Phaenops
- Species: P. abies

Binomial name
- Phaenops abies (Champlain & Knull, 1923)

Species of beetle

Phaenops abies is a species of metallic wood-boring beetle in the family Buprestidae. It is found in North America.
