= Melanophila occidentalis =

Scientific classification
- Kingdom: Animalia
- Phylum: Arthropoda
- Clade: Pancrustacea
- Class: Insecta
- Order: Coleoptera
- Suborder: Polyphaga
- Infraorder: Elateriformia
- Family: Buprestidae
- Genus: Melanophila
- Species: M. occidentalis

Binomial name
- Melanophila occidentalis Obenberger, 1928

Species of beetle

Melanophila occidentalis is a species of metallic wood-boring beetle in the family Buprestidae. It is found in North America.
