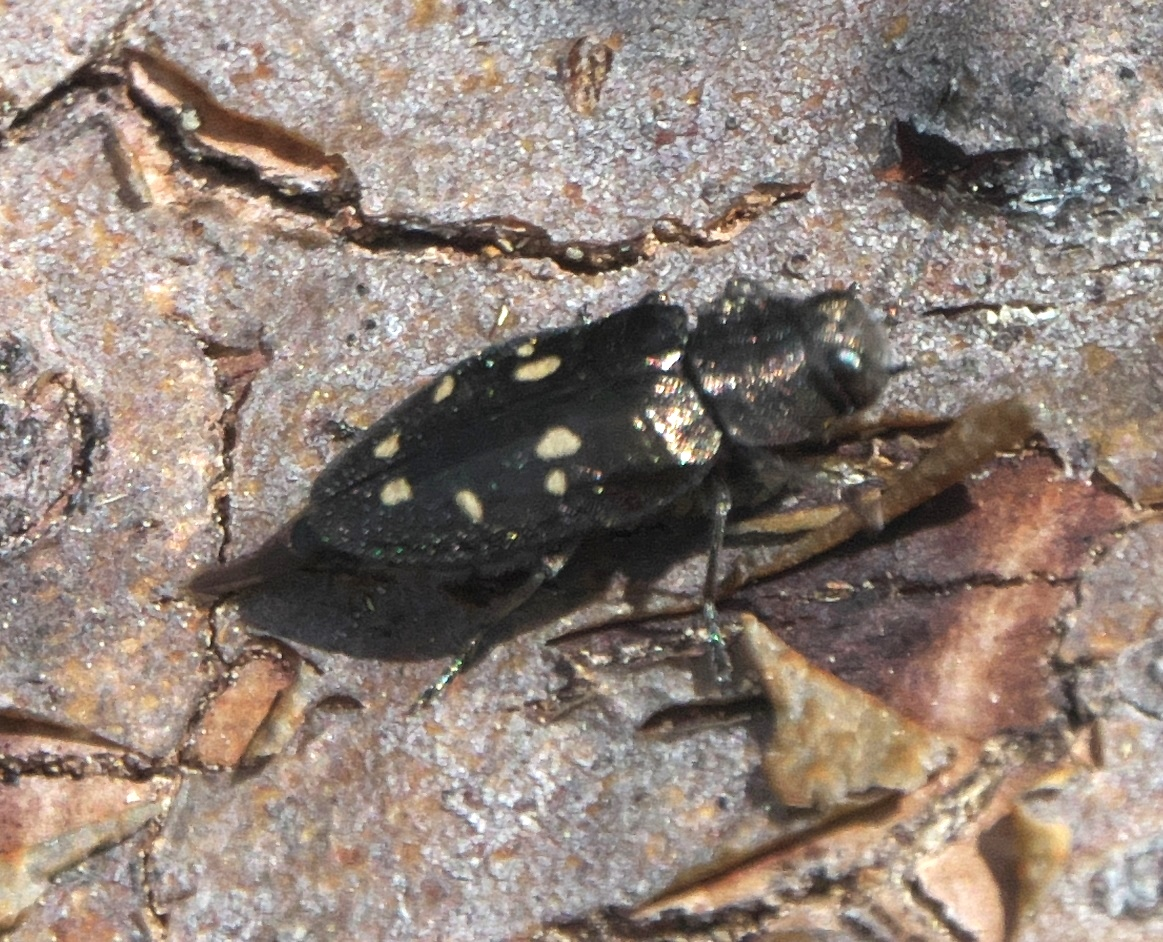
- Phaenops lecontei, Washington

Scientific classification
- Domain: Eukaryota
- Kingdom: Animalia
- Phylum: Arthropoda
- Class: Insecta
- Order: Coleoptera
- Suborder: Polyphaga
- Infraorder: Elateriformia
- Family: Buprestidae
- Genus: Phaenops
- Species: P. lecontei

Binomial name
- Phaenops lecontei (Obenberger, 1928)

Synonyms
- Phaenops arcuatus (Fall, 1932)

= Phaenops lecontei =

Species of beetle

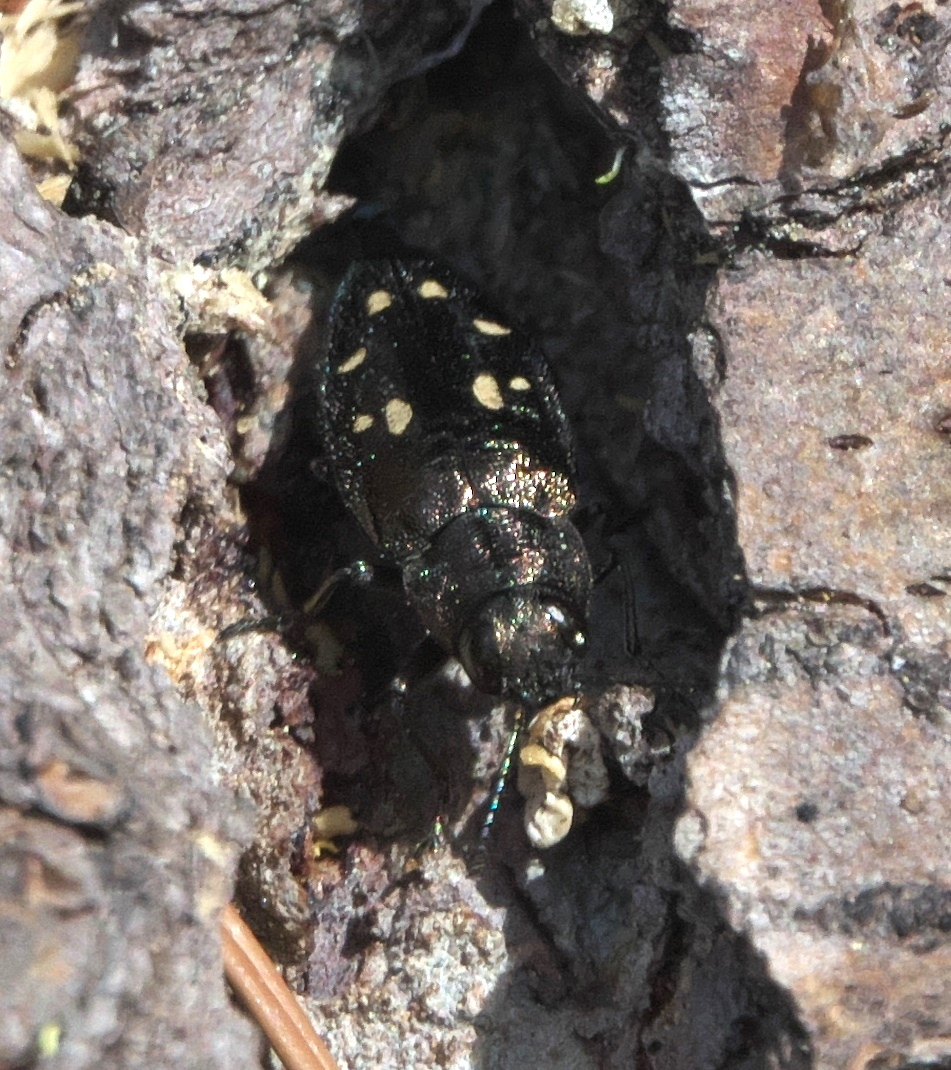
Phaenops lecontei, Washington

Phaenops lecontei is a species of metallic wood-boring beetle in the family Buprestidae. It is found in North America.
