= Sericoda ceylonica =

Scientific classification
- Domain: Eukaryota
- Kingdom: Animalia
- Phylum: Arthropoda
- Class: Insecta
- Order: Coleoptera
- Suborder: Adephaga
- Family: Carabidae
- Genus: Sericoda
- Species: S. ceylonica

Binomial name
- Sericoda ceylonica (Motschulsky, 1859)

Synonyms
- Sericoda philippinensis (Jedlicka, 1935); Sericoda karasawai Tanaka, 1960

Species of beetle

Sericoda ceylonica is a species of black coloured ground beetle from Platyninae subfamily. It was described by Victor Motschulsky in 1859 and is found in Japan, Philippines, and Sri Lanka.
