= Sericoda bembidioides =

Scientific classification
- Domain: Eukaryota
- Kingdom: Animalia
- Phylum: Arthropoda
- Class: Insecta
- Order: Coleoptera
- Suborder: Adephaga
- Family: Carabidae
- Genus: Sericoda
- Species: S. bembidioides

Binomial name
- Sericoda bembidioides Kirby, 1837

Species of beetle

Sericoda bembidioides is a species of ground beetle in the family Carabidae. It is found in North America.
