= Melanophila atropurpurea =

Scientific classification
- Domain: Eukaryota
- Kingdom: Animalia
- Phylum: Arthropoda
- Class: Insecta
- Order: Coleoptera
- Suborder: Polyphaga
- Infraorder: Elateriformia
- Family: Buprestidae
- Genus: Melanophila
- Species: M. atropurpurea

Binomial name
- Melanophila atropurpurea (Say, 1823)

Species of beetle

Melanophila atropurpurea is a species of metallic wood-boring beetle in the family Buprestidae. It is found in Central America and North America.
