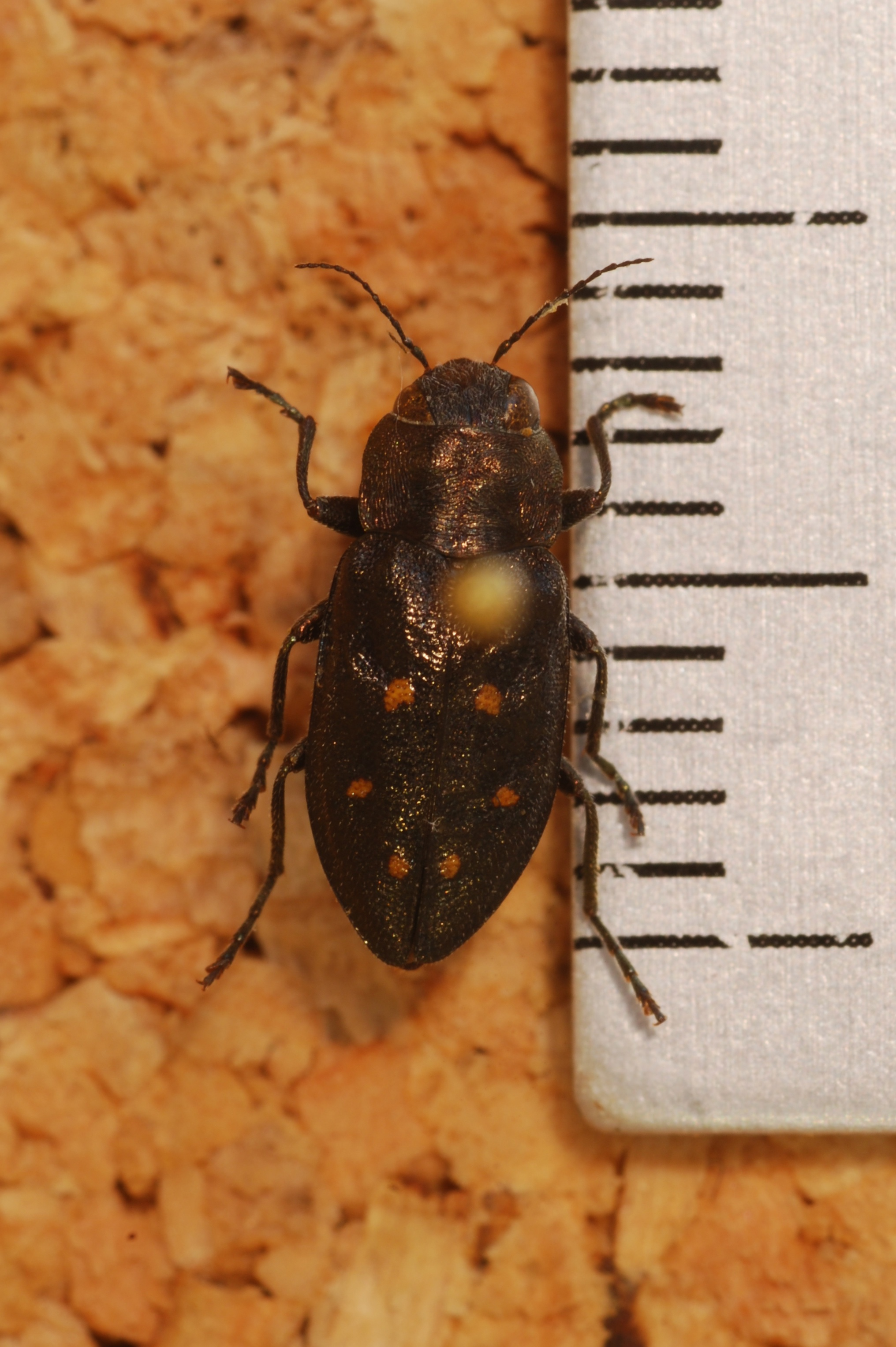

Scientific classification
- Domain: Eukaryota
- Kingdom: Animalia
- Phylum: Arthropoda
- Class: Insecta
- Order: Coleoptera
- Suborder: Polyphaga
- Infraorder: Elateriformia
- Family: Buprestidae
- Genus: Phaenops
- Species: P. drummondi

Binomial name
- Phaenops drummondi (Kirby, 1837)

= Phaenops drummondi =

Species of beetle

Phaenops drummondi, the flatheaded fir borer, is a species of metallic wood-boring beetle in the family Buprestidae. It is found in North America.

== Subspecies ==
These two subspecies belong to the species Phaenops drummondi:

- Phaenops drummondi drummondi (Kirby, 1837)
- Phaenops drummondi nicolayi (Obenberger, 1944)
