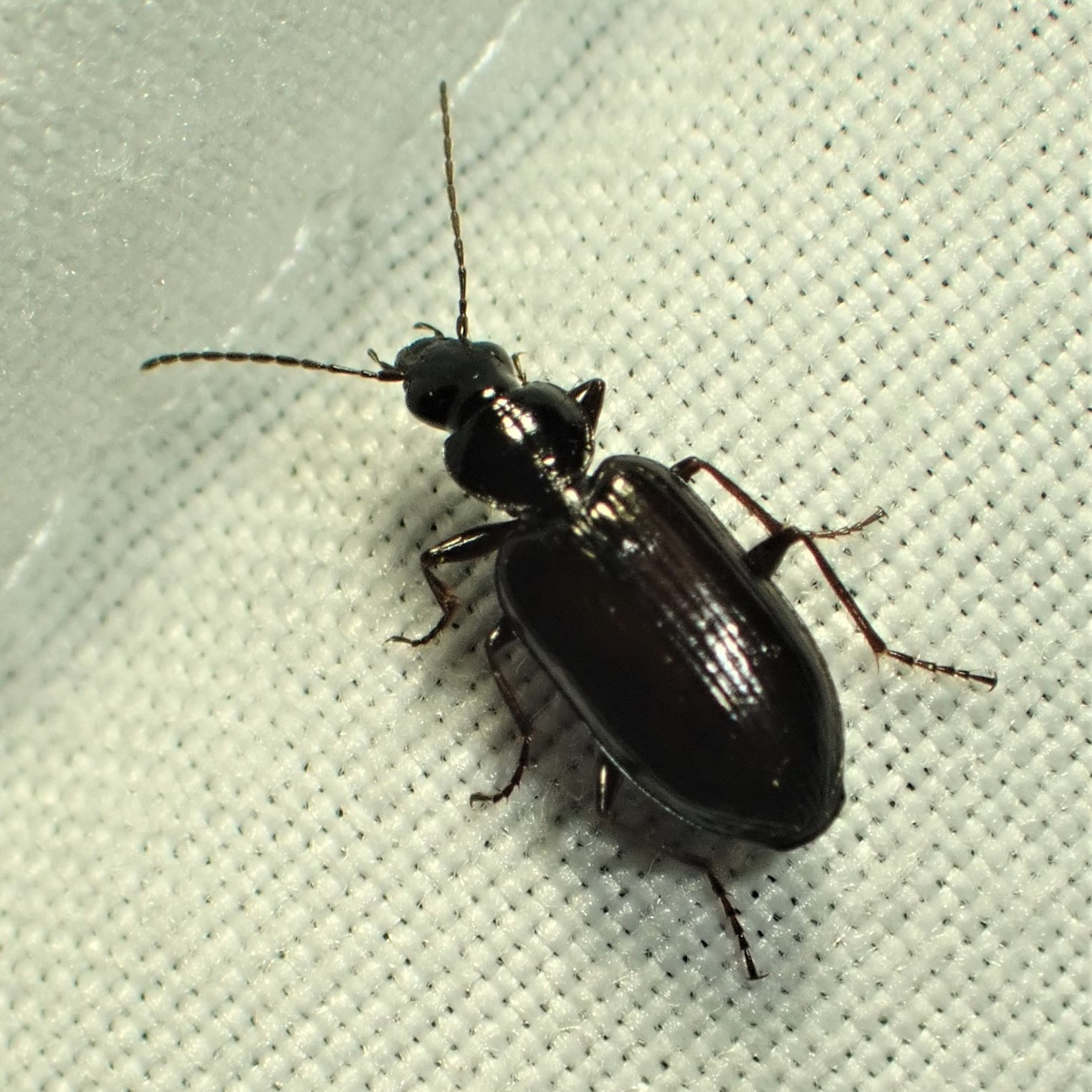

Scientific classification
- Kingdom: Animalia
- Phylum: Arthropoda
- Class: Insecta
- Order: Coleoptera
- Suborder: Adephaga
- Family: Carabidae
- Genus: Sericoda
- Species: S. obsoleta

Binomial name
- Sericoda obsoleta (Say, 1823)

Synonyms
- Feronia obsoleta Say, 1823

= Sericoda obsoleta =

Species of beetle

Sericoda obsoleta is a species of ground beetle in the family Carabidae. It is found in North America.
