= Pyrausta =

Mythological insect from Cyprus

Pyrausta or pyrallis (πυραλλίς) (also called in Greek pyrigonos) is a mythological insect from Cyprus. It is a four-legged insect with filmy wings. It lived in the fire like a salamander and died if it went away from the fire. Janssens identifies it with the Melanophila acuminata.

== See also ==
- Salamanders in folklore
- Dragons in Greek mythology
