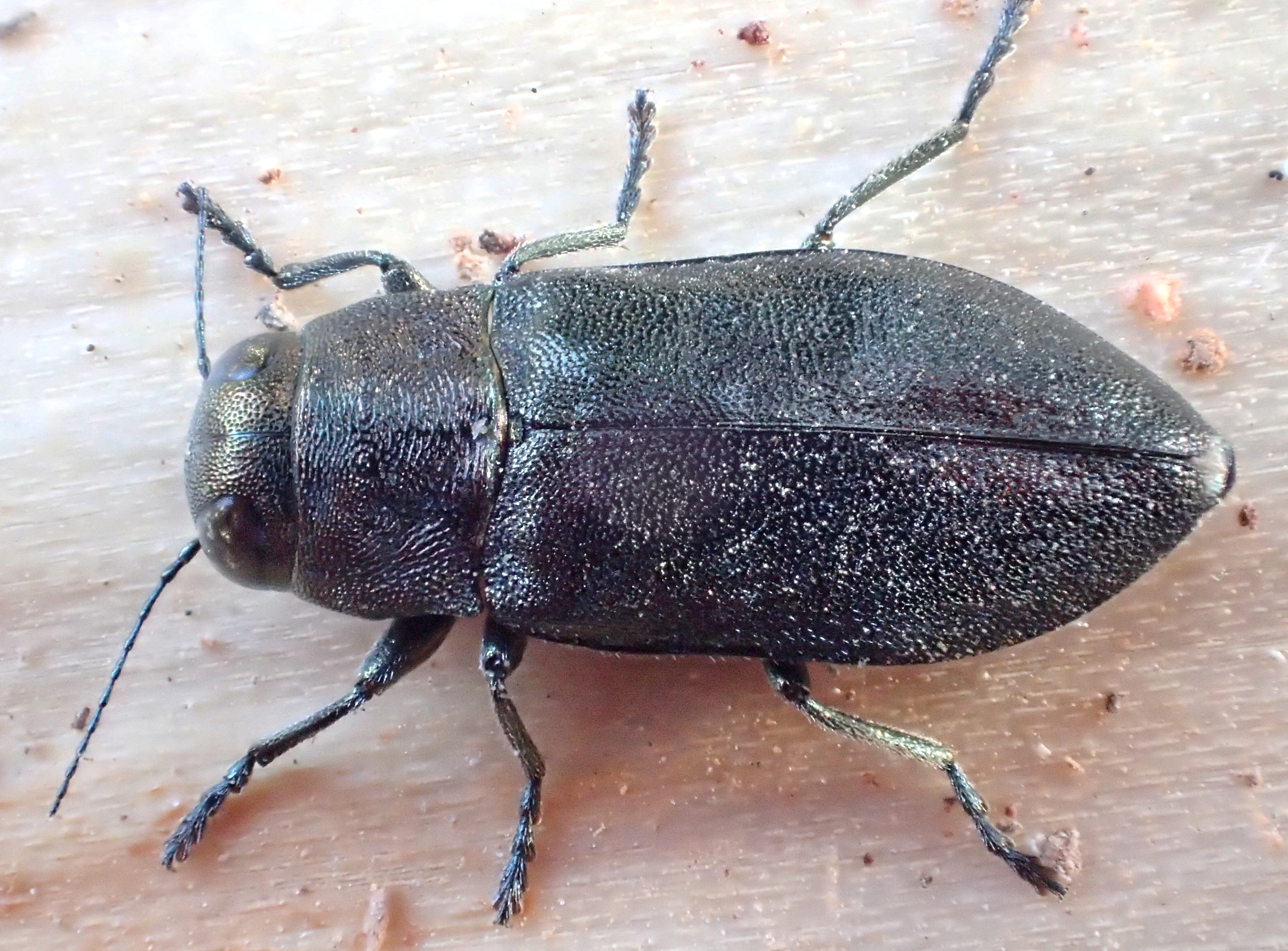
- Phaenops knoteki, Greece

Scientific classification
- Kingdom: Animalia
- Phylum: Arthropoda
- Class: Insecta
- Order: Coleoptera
- Suborder: Polyphaga
- Infraorder: Elateriformia
- Family: Buprestidae
- Subfamily: Buprestinae
- Tribe: Melanophilini
- Genus: Phaenops; Dejean, 1833

= Phaenops (beetle) =

Genus of beetles

Phaenops is a genus of metallic wood-boring beetles, or jewel beetles, in the family Buprestidae, family Buprestinae, tribe Melanophilini. There are more than 20 described species in Phaenops, found in North America and the Palearctic.

== Species ==
These 27 species belong to the genus Phaenops:

- Phaenops abies (Champlain & Knull, 1923) (North America)
- Phaenops aeneola (Melsheimer, 1845) (North America)
- Phaenops aerea Ganglbauer, 1886 (Palearctic)
- Phaenops aneola (Melshimer) (North America)
- Phaenops californica (Van Dyke, 1918) (California flatheaded borer) (North America)
- Phaenops carolina (Manee, 1913) (North America)
- Phaenops caseyi (Obenberger, 1944)
- Phaenops cyanea (Fabricius, 1775) (Palearctic)
- Phaenops delagrangei (Abeille de Perrin, 1891) (Palearctic)
- Phaenops drummondi (Kirby, 1837) (flatheaded fir borer) (North America)
- Phaenops formaneki (Jakobson, 1913) (Europe)
- Phaenops fulvoguttata (Harris, 1829) (hemlock borer) (North America)
- Phaenops gentilis (LeConte, 1863) (North America)
- Phaenops guttulata (Gebler, 1830) (Europe)
- Phaenops horni (Obenberger, 1944)
- Phaenops intrusa (Horn, 1882) (North America)
- Phaenops knoteki Reitter, 1898 (Palearctic)
- Phaenops lecontei (Obenberger, 1928) (North America)
- Phaenops marmottani (Fairmaire, 1868) (Palearctic)
- Phaenops obenbergeri (Knull, 1952) (North America)
- Phaenops obtusa (Horn, 1882) (North America)
- Phaenops piniedulis (Burke, 1908) (North America)
- Phaenops sumptuosa (Abeille de Perrin, 1904) (Palearctic)
- Phaenops vandykei (Obenberger, 1944) (North America)
- Phaenops yang Kubán & Bílý, 2009 (China)
- Phaenops yin Kubán & Bílý, 2009 (China)
- † Phaenops perekischkulensis Alexeev, 1996 (Azerbaijan)
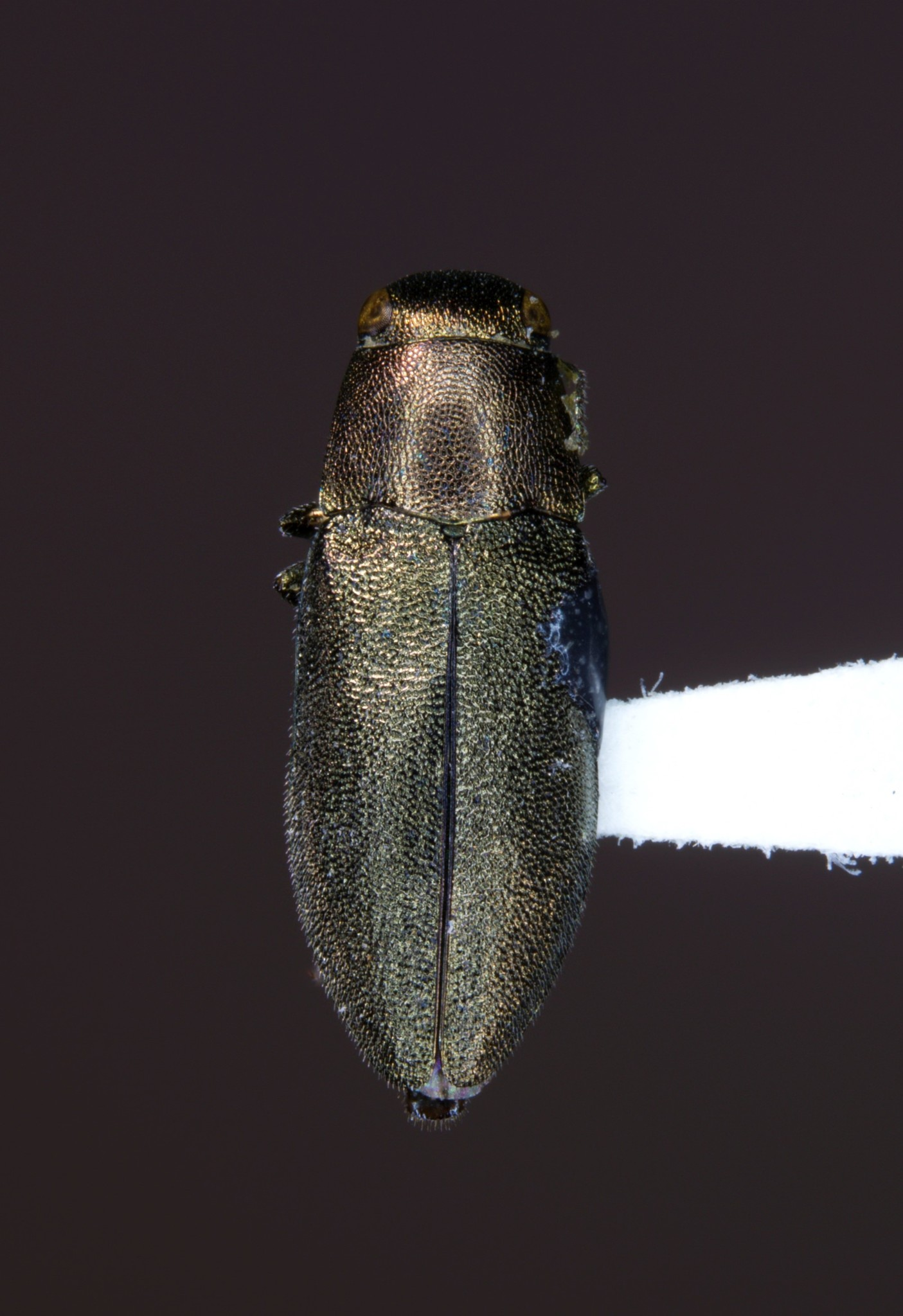
Phaenops aeneola, New Jersey

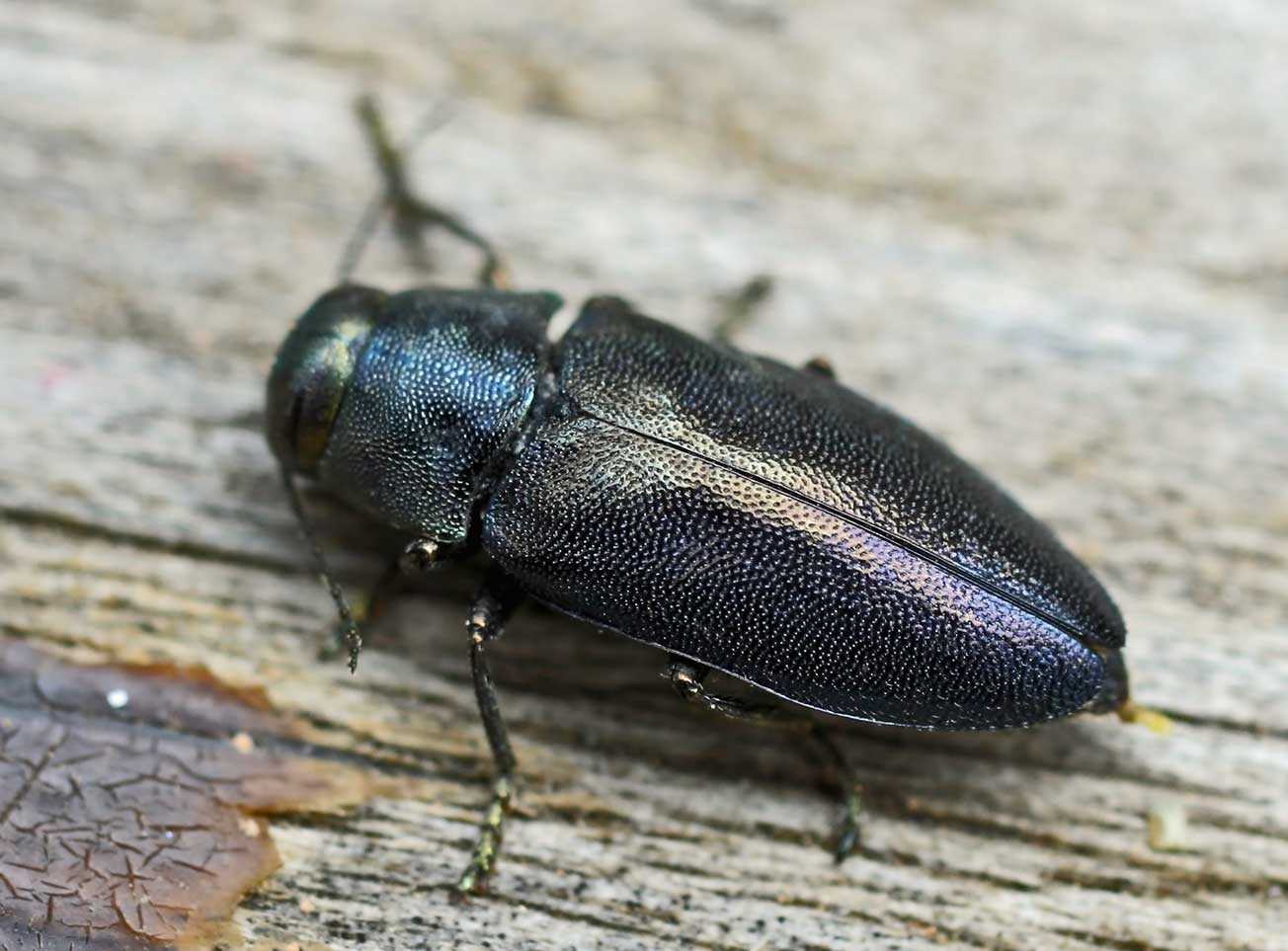
Phaenops cyanea

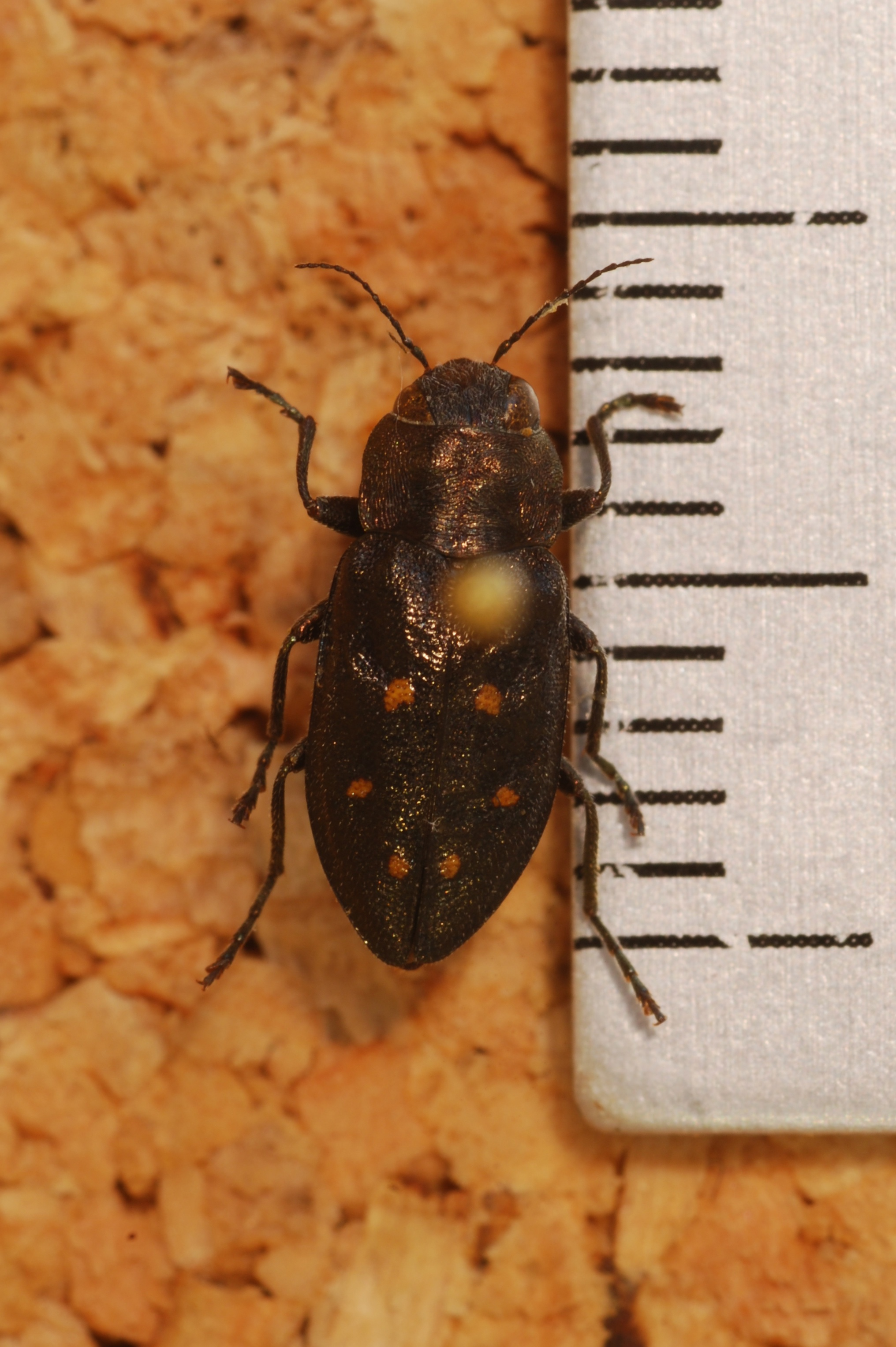
Phaenops drummondi, Canada

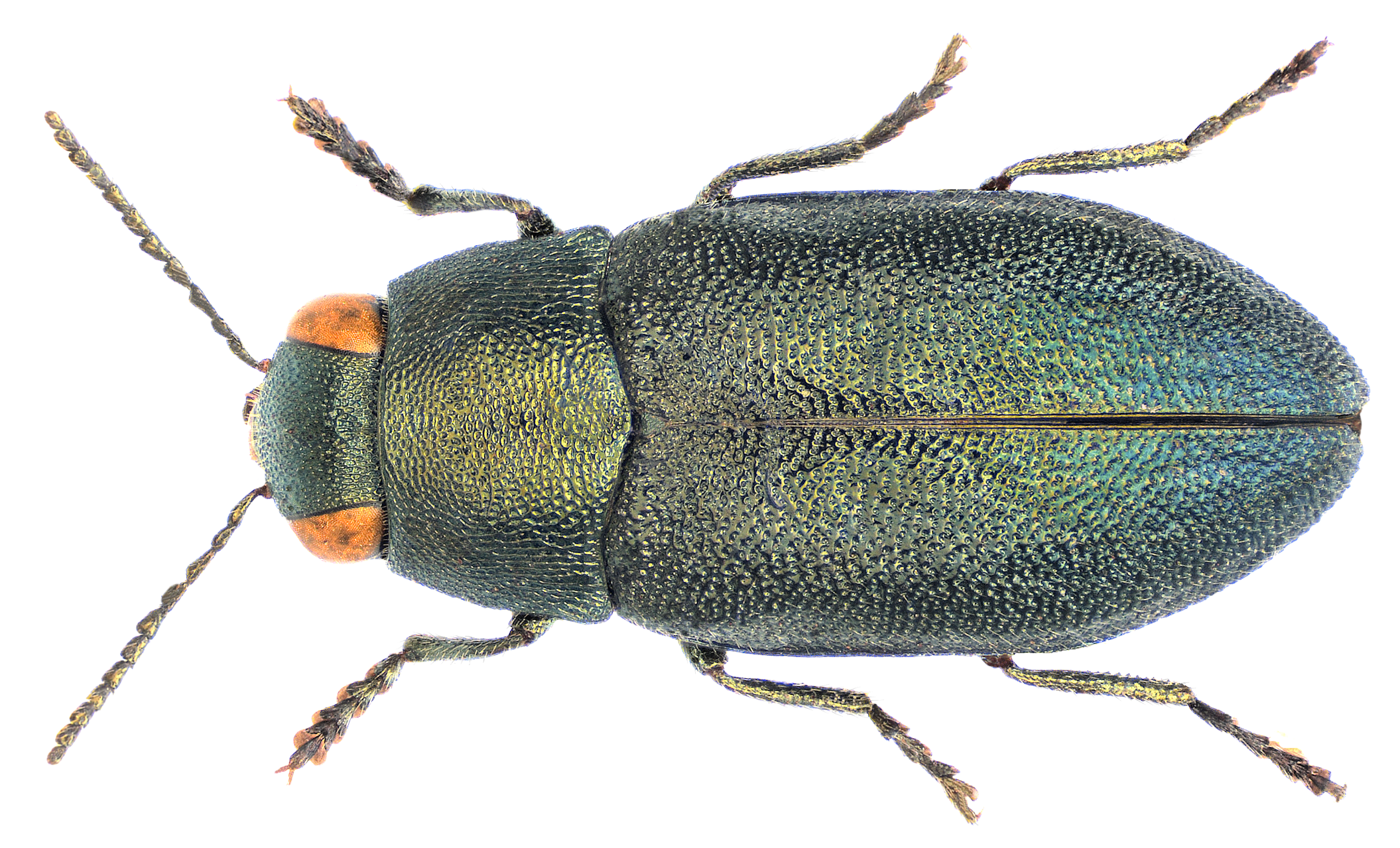
Phaenops formaneki, Czech Republic

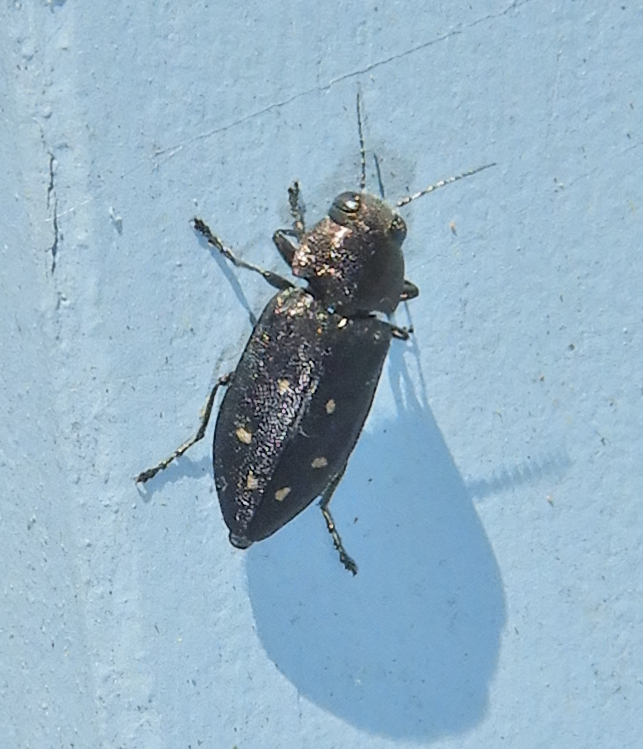
Phaenops fulvoguttata, Maine

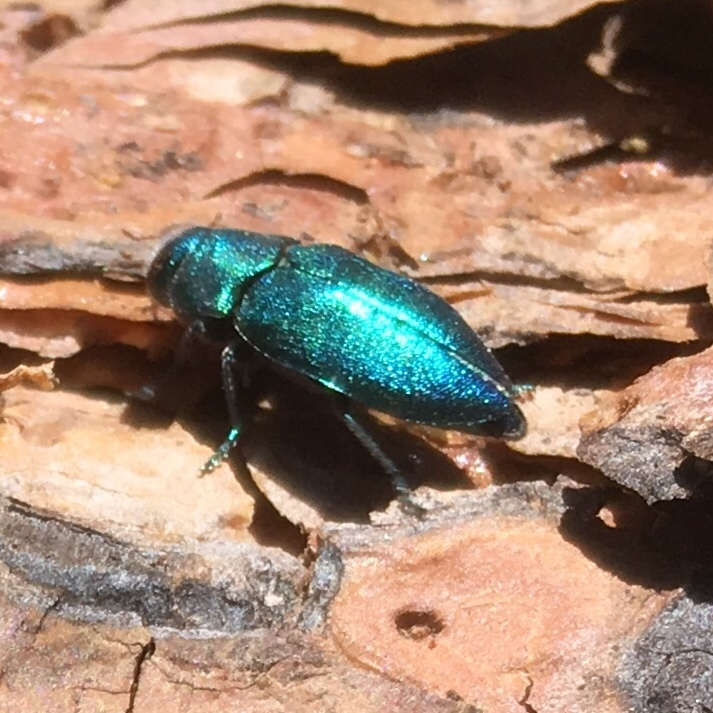
Phaenops gentilis, Arizona

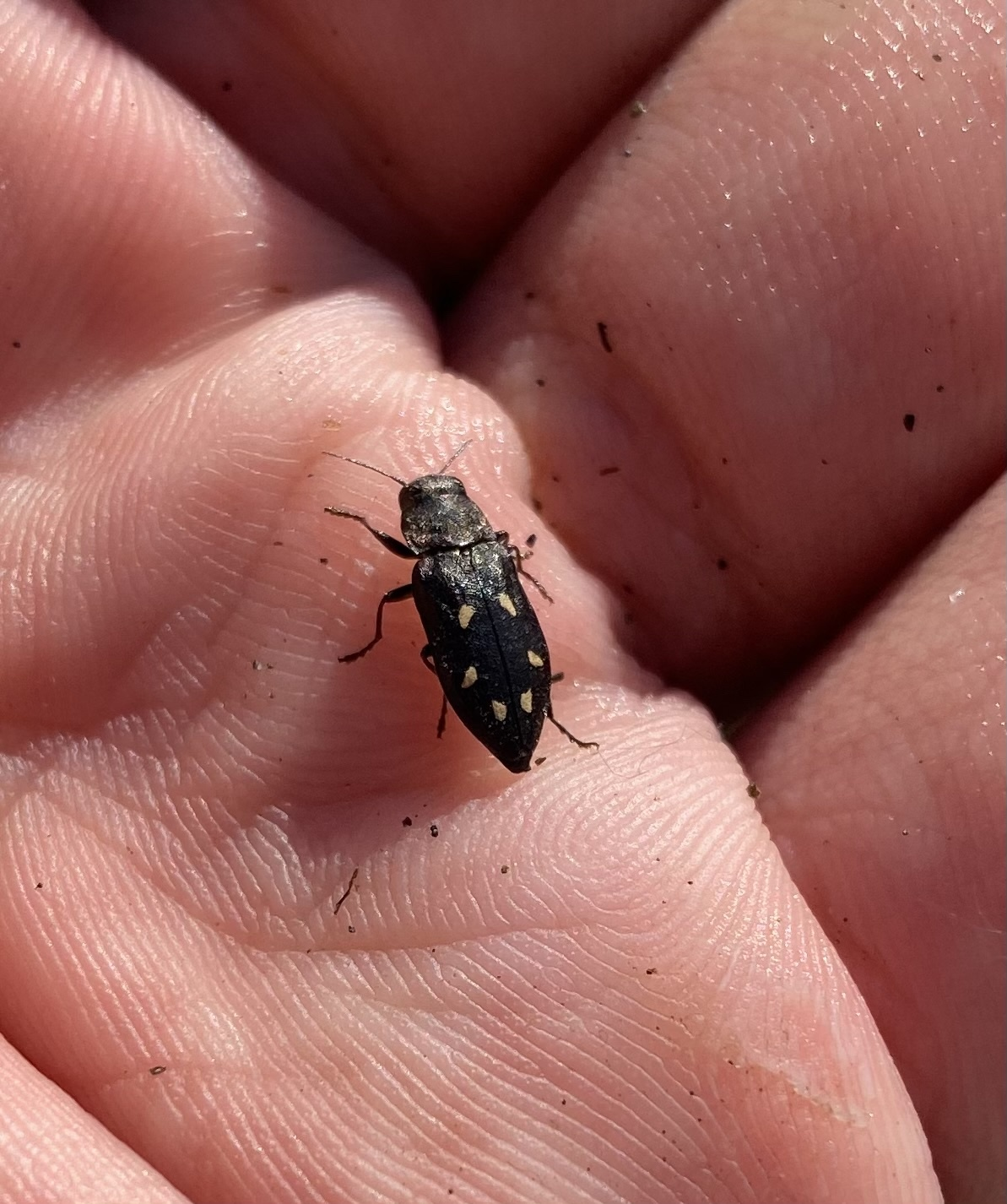
Phaenops guttulata, Russia

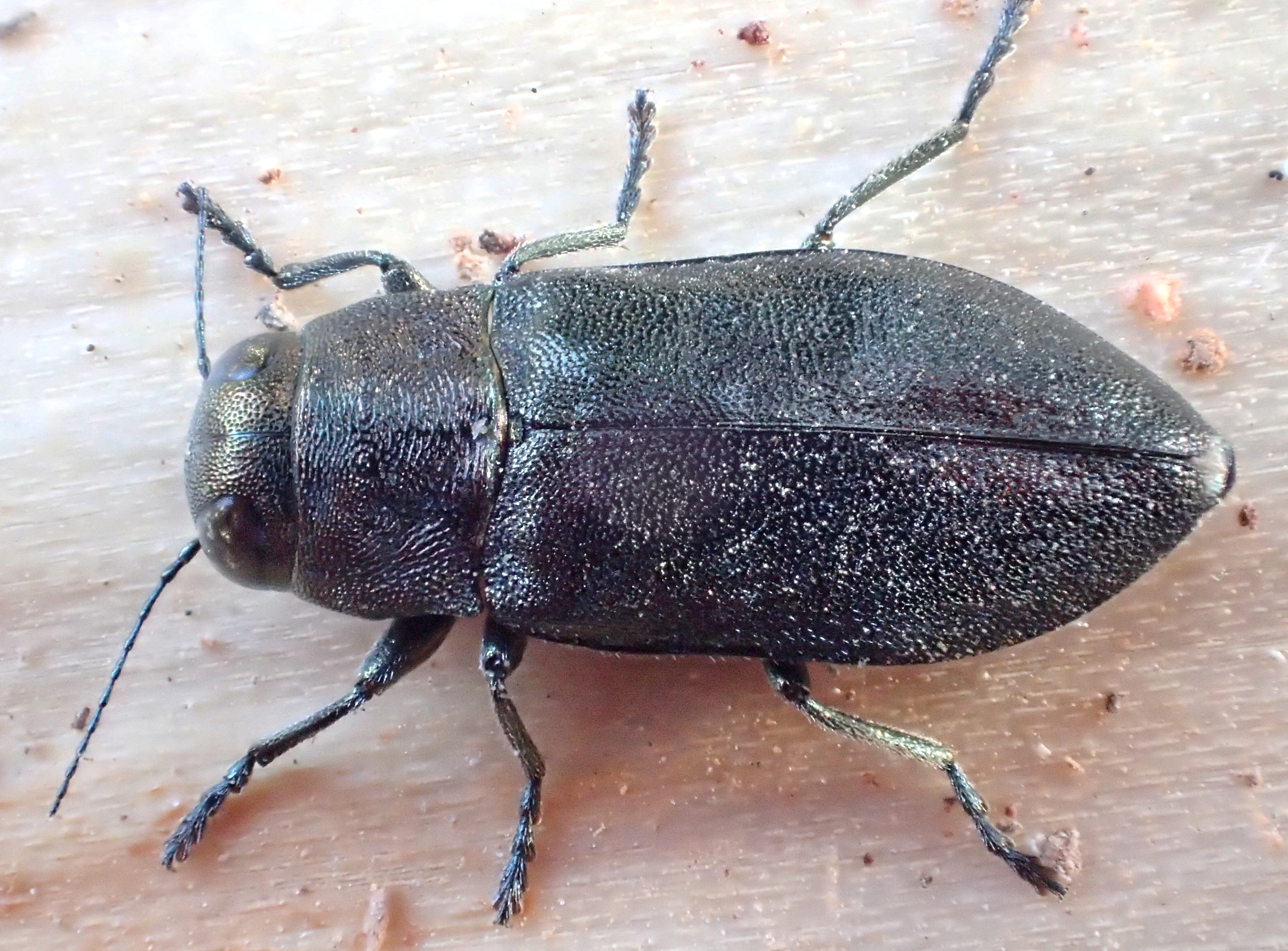
Phaenops knoteki, Greece

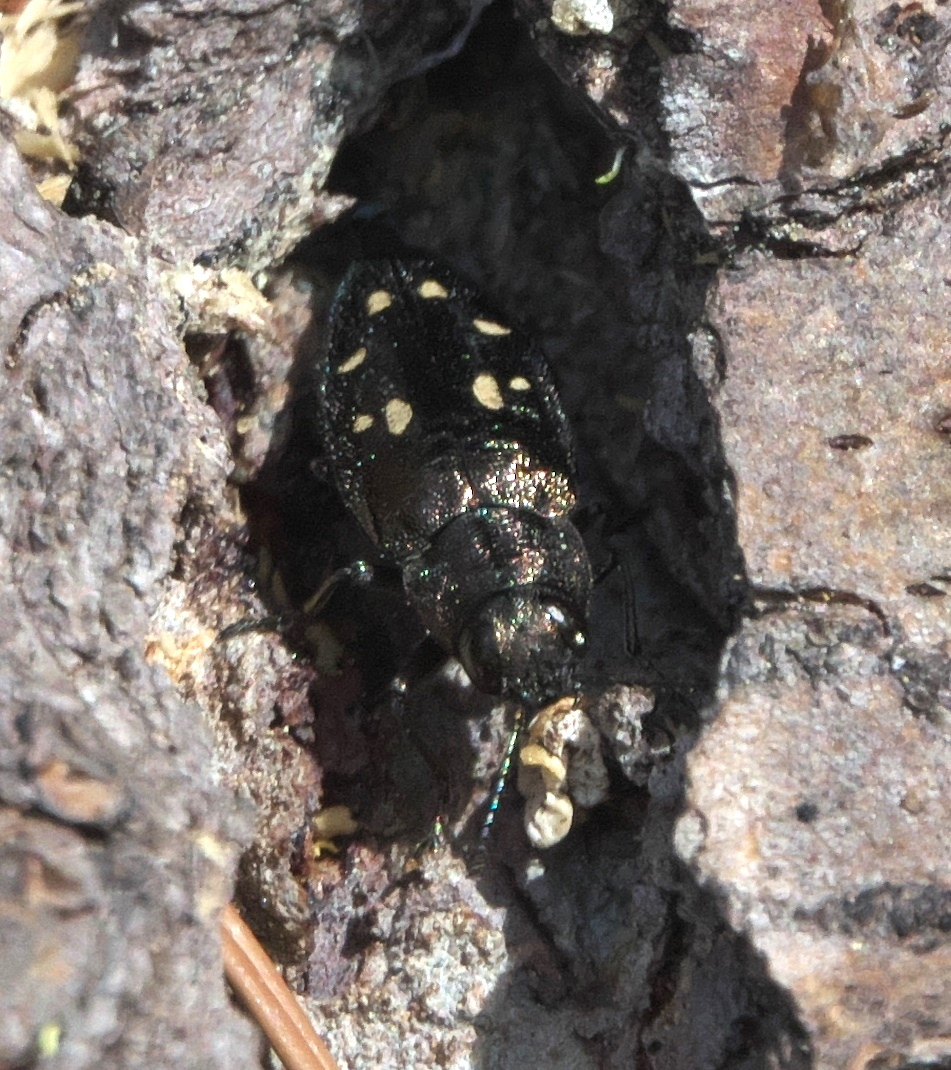
Phaenops lecontei, Washington
