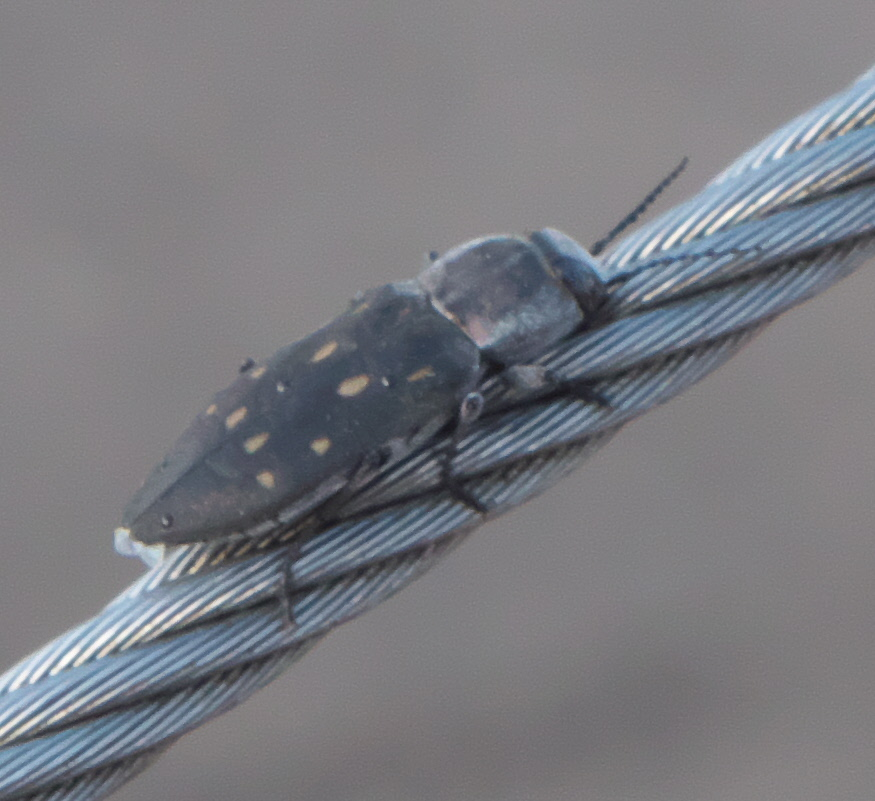
- Melanophila consputa

Scientific classification
- Kingdom: Animalia
- Phylum: Arthropoda
- Class: Insecta
- Order: Coleoptera
- Suborder: Polyphaga
- Infraorder: Elateriformia
- Family: Buprestidae
- Tribe: Melanophilini
- Genus: Melanophila; Eschscholtz, 1829

= Melanophila =

Genus of buprestid beetles

Melanophila is a genus of buprestid beetles commonly known as fire beetles. They have extraordinary sensitivity to infrared radiation (heat), using a specialized sensor organ near their legs. They seek out fires in order to mate and lay eggs in freshly burned wood.

== Species ==
The genus Melanophila consists of the following species:

- Melanophila acuminata (DeGeer, 1774)
- Melanophila atra Gory, 1841
- Melanophila atropurpurea (Say, 1823)
- Melanophila caudata (Laporte & Gory, 1837)
- Melanophila consputa LeConte, 1857
- Melanophila cockerellae Wickham, 1912
- Melanophila coriacea Kerremans, 1894
- Melanophila cuspidata (Klug, 1829)
- Melanophila gestroi Obenberger, 1923
- Melanophila handlirschi Wickham, 1912
- Melanophila heeri Wickham, 1914
- Melanophila ignicola Champion, 1918
- Melanophila notata (Laporte & Gory, 1837)
- Melanophila obscurata Lewis, 1893
- Melanophila occidentalis Obenberger, 1928
- Melanophila unicolor Gory, 1841
