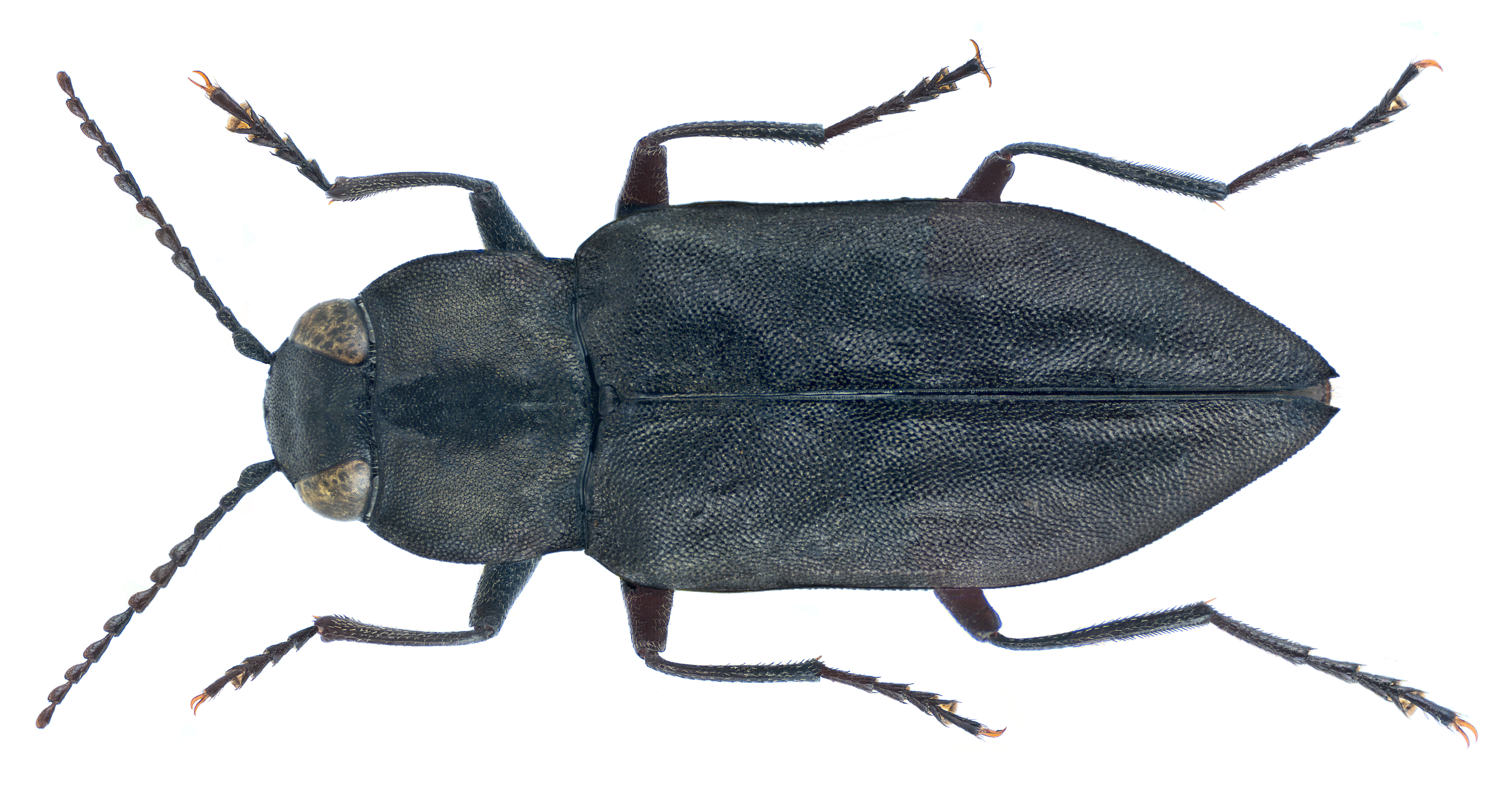
- Melanophila acuminata

Scientific classification
- Domain: Eukaryota
- Kingdom: Animalia
- Phylum: Arthropoda
- Class: Insecta
- Order: Coleoptera
- Suborder: Polyphaga
- Infraorder: Elateriformia
- Family: Buprestidae
- Subfamily: Buprestinae
- Tribe: Melanophilini; Bedel, 1921

= Melanophilini =

Tribe of beetles

Melanophilini is a tribe of metallic wood-boring beetles in the family Buprestidae. There are at least 4 genera and 20 described species in Melanophilini.

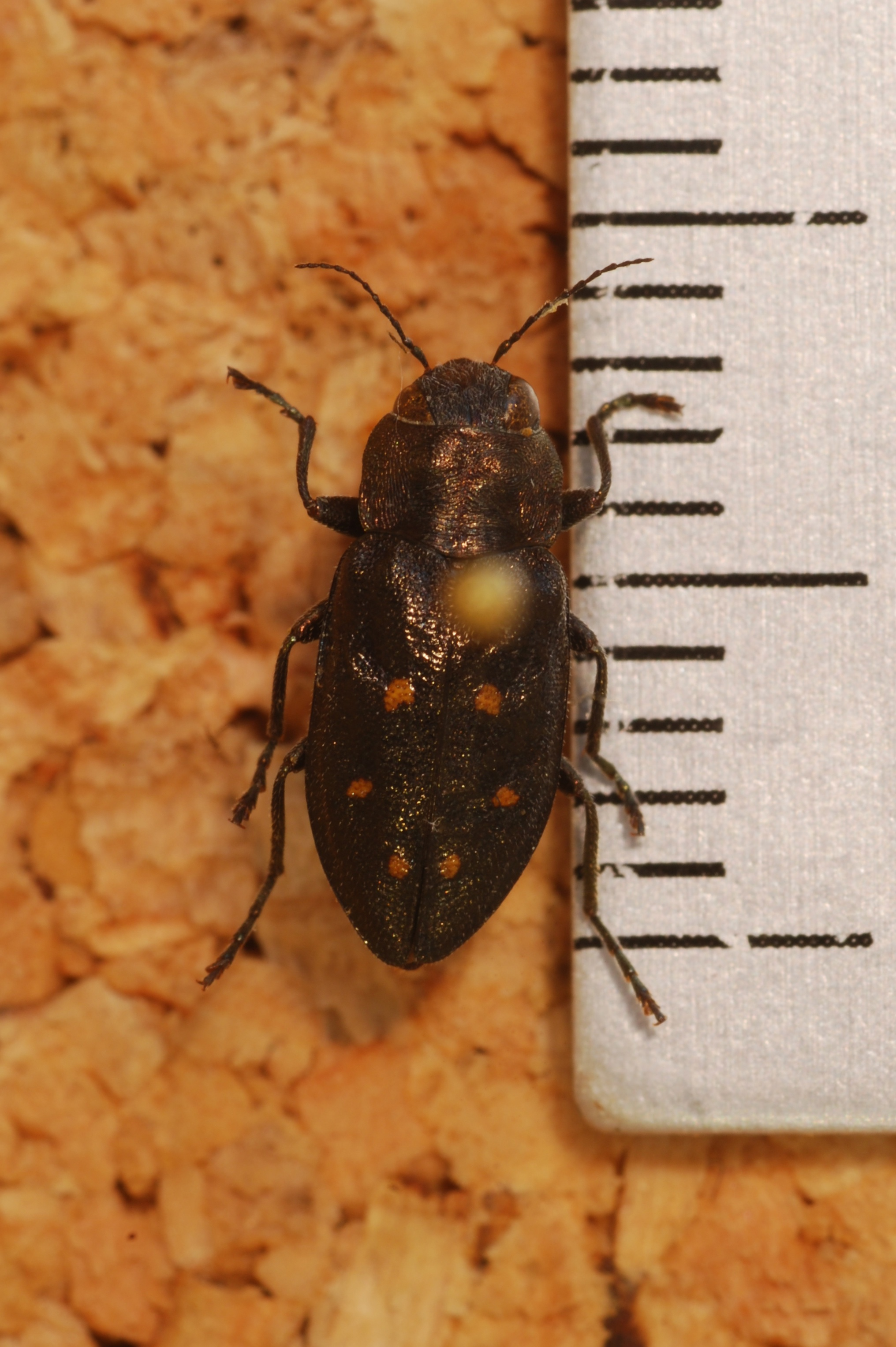
Phaenops drummondi

== Genera ==
- Juniperella Knull, 1947
- Melanophila Eschscholtz, 1829
- Phaenops Dejean, 1833
- Xenomelanophila Sloop, 1937
