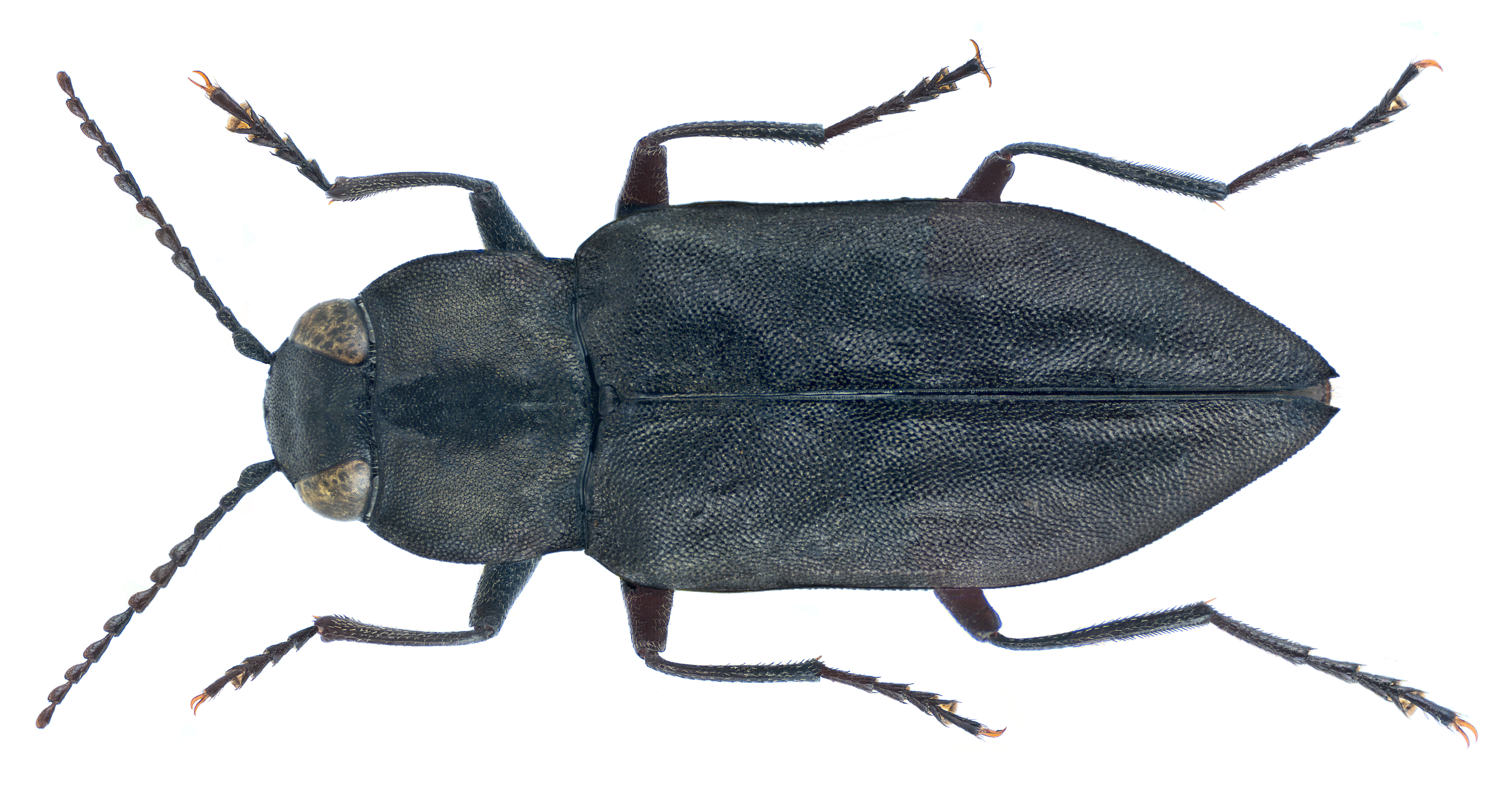

Scientific classification
- Kingdom: Animalia
- Phylum: Arthropoda
- Clade: Pancrustacea
- Class: Insecta
- Order: Coleoptera
- Suborder: Polyphaga
- Infraorder: Elateriformia
- Family: Buprestidae
- Genus: Melanophila
- Species: M. acuminata

Binomial name
- Melanophila acuminata (De Geer, 1774)

Synonyms
- Melanophila acuta (Gmelin, 1790); Melanophila anthaxoides Marquet, 1870; Melanophila appendiculata (Fabricius, 1792); Melanophila immaculata Mannerheim, 1837; Melanophila longipes (Say, 1823); Melanophila morio (Fabricius, 1792); Melanophila obscurata Lewis, 1893; Melanophila opaca LeConte, 1860

= Melanophila acuminata =

Species of beetle

Melanophila acuminata, known generally as the black fire beetle or fire bug, is a species of metallic wood-boring beetle in the family Buprestidae. It is found in the Caribbean, Europe and Northern Asia (excluding China), Central America, North America, and Southern Asia. They get their common name due to the fact that they swarm freshly burned conifer trees, which they find using sensors on their thorax. Adults are black and 7–11 mm in length.

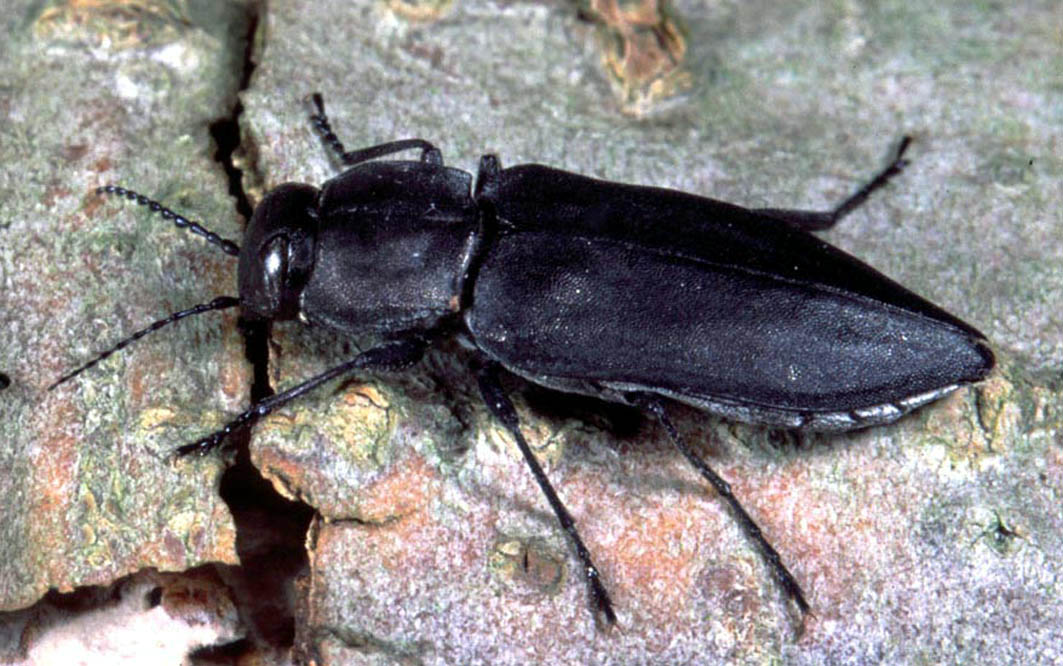
Black fire beetle, Melanophila acuminata

It has been suggested that this species is the pyrotocon, an insect said to be born from fire, of the Natural history by Pliny the Elder.

== Geographic range ==
The Melanophila acuminata species of the family is the most geographically distributed, with individuals spanning across the Holarctic region (Australia, Tasmania, New Guinea) to Northern Africa to the Caribbeans where they were likely introduced. While its prevalence and abundance are relatively evenly distributed rather than being concentrated in a certain region, they are more sporadic and face the risk of extirpation in Europe. This is likely due to the high fire control and predominance of commercial softwood forestry native to Europe. In the Nearctic, adults swarm in huge numbers to forest fires and use coniferous species (Pine, Fir, Conifers) as hosts.

== Food resources ==
Because the species utilizes various plants and trees as hosts, they primarily consume these as food resources, in addition to sap and other fluids from burned trees. Their specialized mouth structures make them well adapted for this diet, which is heavily reliant on moisture and liquid for nutrition. Furthermore, several alternative food resources include decaying organic matter present in areas affected by fires, such as fungus, microorganisms, and animal flesh. However, limited research has delved into Melanophila acuminata's food resources as researchers' primary focus has been on its behavior and ecology.

== Parental care ==
Although parental care is a pivotal role in insect reproductive strategies and offspring fitness, relatively little is known about parental care in Melanophila acuminata. Research has documented that females select suitable oviposition sites by seeking burned and charred wood substrates. Chemical cues emitted from burned vegetation has a huge effect on mediating oviposition site selection, as well as egg laying behavior. Parents will guard and groom egg clusters to enhance egg survival and maximize hatchling emergence rate. In addition, parents will deposit nutrient-rich secretions to support larval growth, exhibiting significant parental roles in the survival of their larvae.

== Social behavior ==
Social behavior encompasses a diverse range of interactions among this population, influencing ecological dynamics and population structures. Understanding the social behavior of the species (such as their aggregation tendencies, communication methods, and cooperative behaviors) helps us understand more about adaptive strategies within fire-affected landscapes. Firstly, Melanophila acuminata like to form groups on burned trees and charred vegetation, suggesting the presence of pheromones that moderate this behavior, as well as highlighting the role of environmental factors like temperature and humidity in influencing these trends. Next, communication plays a crucial role in facilitating social interactions and effective coordination within the group. They display chemical signaling and auditory cues that may serve as indicators for mate attraction or resource location. Furthermore, cooperative behaviors promote collective defense, resource acquisition, and reproduction to mitigate conflicts like predators and environmental threats. Several cooperative strategies include communal feeding patterns and nesting behaviors, which display how Melanophila acuminata has adapted to ecological challenges to manage their species.

== Genetics ==
One study analyzed the genetic makeup of Melanophila acuminata native to the United Kingdom. Researchers sequenced the mitochondrial genome of the species and found a circular molecule that was over 15,000 base pairs long. The genome was composed of the typical set of 37 genes found in traditional animal mitochondrial genomes and mirrored the arrangement found in coleopterans. There were overlapping nucleotides between genes and intergenic nucleotides that alluded to a more complex genotypic landscape and structure. In addition, phylogenetic analysis of the beetle and 19 other coleopteran species revealed that they have a close relationship with Chrysochroa fulgidissima, a jewel beetle native to Japan and Korea. In a more macro perspective, coleopterans have an evolutionary connection with the Scarabaeoidea families.

== Mating ==
Several research articles revealed the fire-loving beetle Melanophila acuminata exhibited reduced wing load and higher flight-muscle mass compared to two closely related nonpyrophilous (non-fire-loving) species. Despite being larger in size, this shift towards greater dispersal was associated with decreased egg count and ovarioles, demonstrating some sort of trade-off between dispersal ability and reproductive output. Furthermore, their breeding habitat is usually found in burned green environments from recently burned forests to forests with small-scale disturbances to bogs that highlight the range of conditions in which they establish temporary and permanent mating sites. Perhaps their most striking adaptive feature, infrared receptors, emerged from their ability to thrive in fires.

Following arrival to a mating location, female and male mate, and once the flames diminish, females display egg-laying behavior in tree barks. She usually targets the most impacted burnt areas, sometimes even while it's still smoldering. The first instar larvae feeds within the bark and spends the winter throughout this stage, while instars following will burrow into plant tissue to undergo further maturity for a few years before pupating in the spring . Larvae rely on the wood in freshly burned trees since they are mainly free of predators and because they don't have the ability to defend themselves against the tree's natural chemicals. Finally, adult Melanophila acuminata emerge from D-shaped exist holes and continue to visit the burnt timber for up to a year after fires, made possible due to their strong flying capabilities.

== Physiology ==
=== Olfaction ===
As a result of their attraction to burning live conifer trees, they are most active in the daytime from May to September. Furthermore, they are primarily reliant on their olfactory senses to detect fires, even though they are also drawn to infrared radiation emitted by hot surfaces, which is especially risky in urbanized locations.

They can quickly arrive after fires, since they have two infrared sensory receptors in the thorax that contain water and expand upon heat detection, triggering their nervous system to find the source up to significant distances away. Their remarkable trait that allows them to swiftly colonize recently burned areas confers a reproductive advantage by granting access to heat-sterilized ovipositing sites that are usually free of soil-dwelling enemies.

=== Appearance ===
The beetle species stands out within its fauna due to its large body size and metallic-black appearance, especially distinguished by its elytra that extends into a pointed shape. Its dorsal surface is between 8 and 11mm long and its ventral surface is adorned with stiff bristles. Their heads feature prominent eyes and lines across the forehand. Between sexes, males have middle legs with tiny teeth and a deep cut at its dorsal.

=== Gustation ===
Gustation preferences vary depending on life stage, environmental cues, and nutritional needs, all emphasizing the plasticity of this behavior. Larvae and adults respond to chemical stimuli such as amino acids, metabolites, and sugars to achieve their dietary requirements. Taste sensilla and gustatory receptors have been found in the mouths and antennae of the beetle to aid neural processing in the nervous system. Following consumption, Melanophila acuminata have anatomical structures and digestive enzymes involved with food breakdown. Key organs such as the foregut, midgut, and hindgut complemented with proteases and lipases hydrolyze macromolecules into nutrients that can sustain energy levels, growth, and reproduction.

=== Thermoregulation ===
Research about Melanophila acuminata's physiological adaptation to thermal settings showed that they have various mechanisms to help maintain their internal body temperatures within an acceptable range. In particular, they use cuticular pigmentation to minimize heat dissipation and maximize heat absorption that maintains metabolic and water balance mechanisms. This is accomplished through their intricate sensory detection system that contain specialized organs and limbs responsible for thermosensation and heat localization.

== Microbiome ==
Various bacterial and fungal microbiomes reside in the exoskeleton, gut, and reproductive organs of the beetle. These communities play critical roles in detoxification, digestion, and reproductive success that allow them to adapt to fire-prone ecosystems, so they can prosper in nutrient-poor and toxin-rich environments. This extends to beyond the organism itself as there are significant implications for fire ecology through influencing nutrient cycling and strengthening ecosystem resilience. Feedback mechanisms between Melanophila acuminata and their habitat influences fire severity and frequency in these settings.

== Interactions with humans and livestock ==
=== Forestry and agriculture ===
Melanophila acuminata has significant impacts on forestry and agriculture, especially in areas that are prone to wildfires. The beetle infests and has huge potential to damage timber which can amount to economic losses for the wood industry. Furthermore, larvae drill through wooden structures like utility poles, floors, fences, etc. which cause structural damage and risks to human safety.

=== Risks to human infrastructure ===
The species' interactions also impact human infrastructure due to their attraction to heat sources which is prevalent among industrial services and electrical facilities that can cause large-scale infestations. Urban and suburban areas may see increased fire hazards because of the beetle's habit of nesting and laying eggs in wooden structures.

== Conservation ==
Since this species has critical ecological roles in fire-prone ecosystems, conflicts such as habitat loss, deforestation, and human-induced disturbances threaten their population. Identifying factors that influence population size and distribution can help mitigate current population declines due to land fragmentation and unsuitable microhabitat features like temperature and moisture.

Some examples of conservation initiatives aimed at protecting Melanophila acuminata include restoration practices like prescribed burning and controlled forest management. On a broader note, public awareness campaigns inform individuals and stakeholders about their conservation needs to ensure long-term viability of this species.
