= Buprestis intricata =

Scientific classification
- Kingdom: Animalia
- Phylum: Arthropoda
- Class: Insecta
- Order: Coleoptera
- Suborder: Polyphaga
- Infraorder: Elateriformia
- Family: Buprestidae
- Genus: Buprestis
- Species: B. intricata

Binomial name
- Buprestis intricata Casey, 1909

Synonyms
- Buprestis contortae Hopping, 1933; Buprestis murrayanae Hopping, 1934

Species of beetle

Buprestis intricata is a species of metallic wood-boring beetle in the family Buprestidae. It is found in North America.
