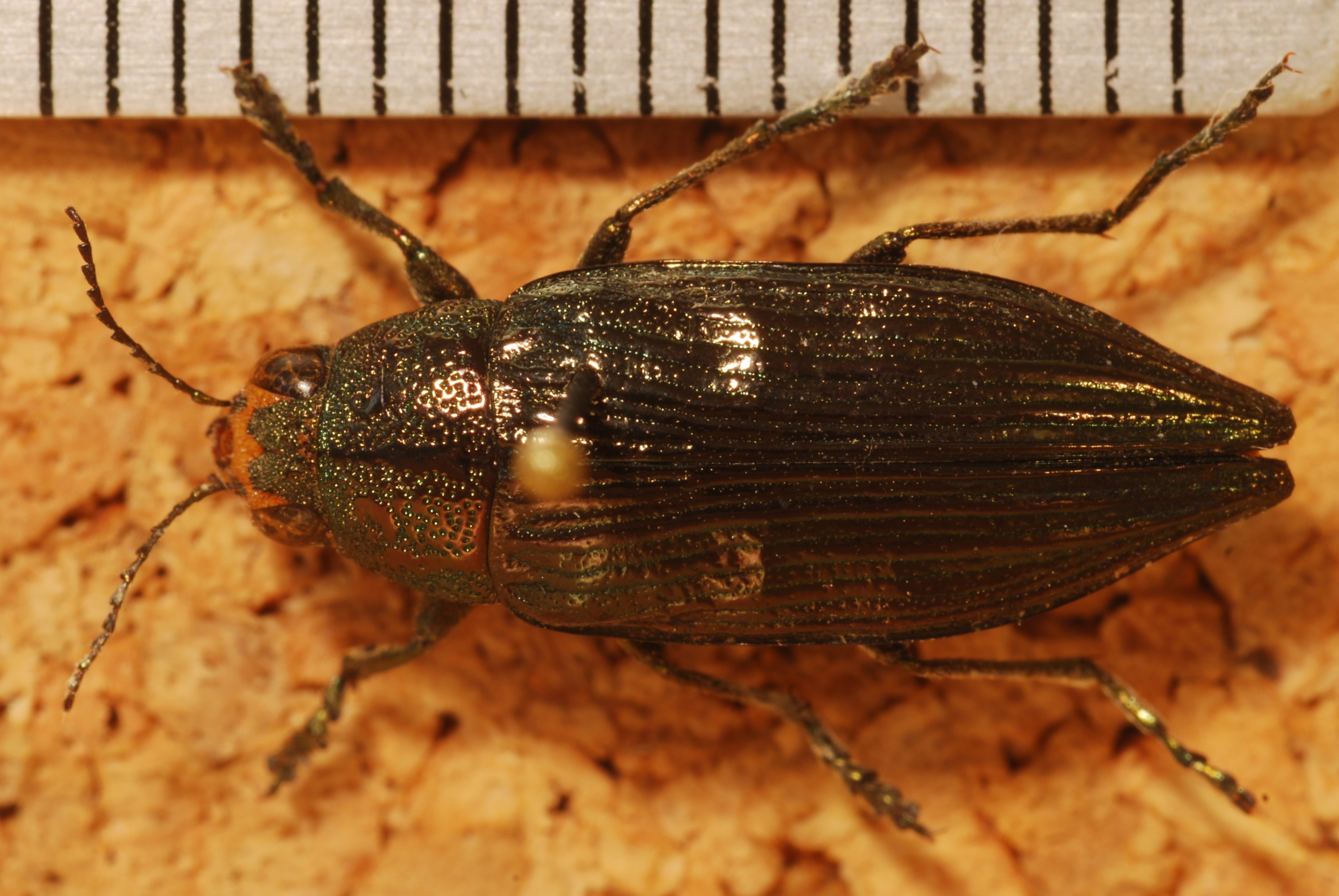

Scientific classification
- Domain: Eukaryota
- Kingdom: Animalia
- Phylum: Arthropoda
- Class: Insecta
- Order: Coleoptera
- Suborder: Polyphaga
- Infraorder: Elateriformia
- Family: Buprestidae
- Genus: Buprestis
- Species: B. maculativentris

Binomial name
- Buprestis maculativentris Say, 1824

Synonyms
- Buprestis paganorum Kirby, 1837; Buprestis rusticorum Kirby, 1837; Buprestis sexnotata Laporte and Gory, 1837

= Buprestis maculativentris =

Species of beetle

Buprestis maculativentris, the ventrally spotted buprestid, is a species of metallic wood-boring beetle in the family Buprestidae. It is found in North America.
