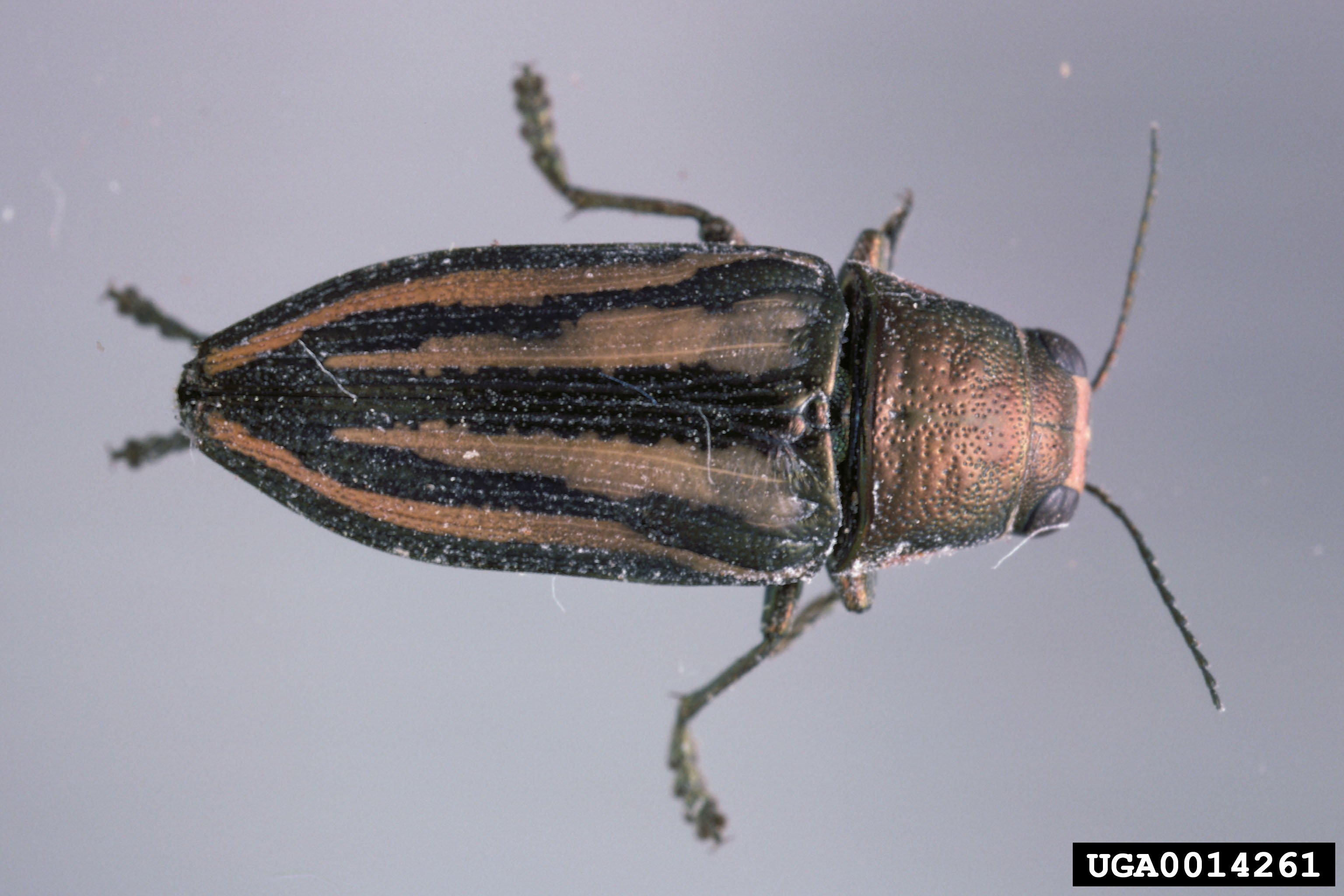

Scientific classification
- Domain: Eukaryota
- Kingdom: Animalia
- Phylum: Arthropoda
- Class: Insecta
- Order: Coleoptera
- Suborder: Polyphaga
- Infraorder: Elateriformia
- Family: Buprestidae
- Genus: Buprestis
- Species: B. lineata

Binomial name
- Buprestis lineata Fabricius, 1775

Synonyms
- Buprestis davisi Nicolay and Weiss, 1918

= Buprestis lineata =

Species of beetle

Buprestis lineata, the lined buprestris, is a species of metallic wood-boring beetle in the family Buprestidae.
