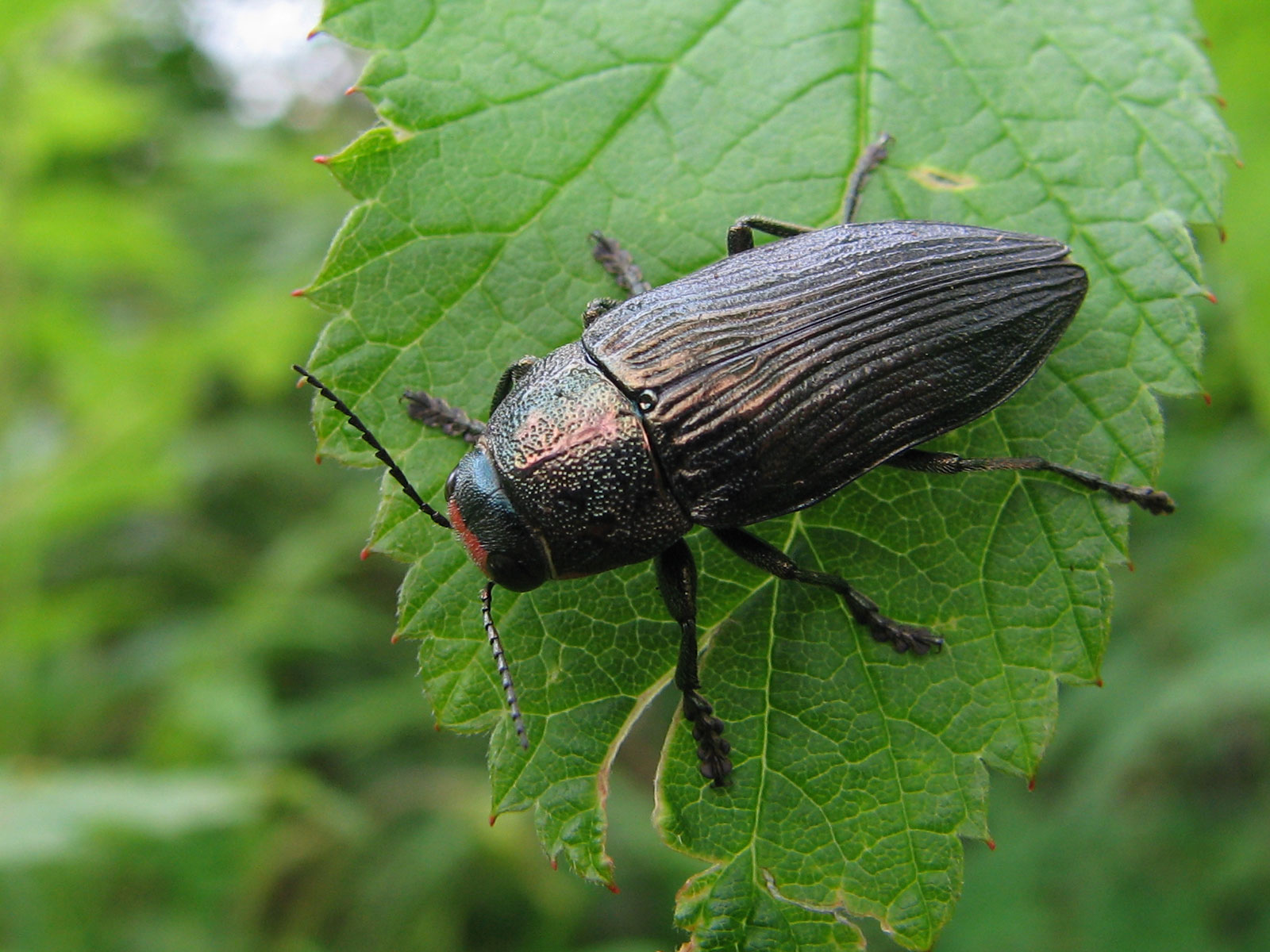

Scientific classification
- Kingdom: Animalia
- Phylum: Arthropoda
- Class: Insecta
- Order: Coleoptera
- Suborder: Polyphaga
- Infraorder: Elateriformia
- Family: Buprestidae
- Genus: Buprestis
- Species: B. lyrata

Binomial name
- Buprestis lyrata Casey, 1909

Synonyms
- Buprestis acomana Casey, 1909; Buprestis adducta Casey, 1909; Buprestis caliginosa Casey, 1909; Buprestis fusca Casey, 1909; Buprestis morosa Casey, 1909; Buprestis nigricans Casey, 1909; Buprestis sublivida Casey, 1909

= Buprestis lyrata =

Species of beetle

Buprestis lyrata is a species of metallic wood-boring beetle in the family Buprestidae. It is found in North America.

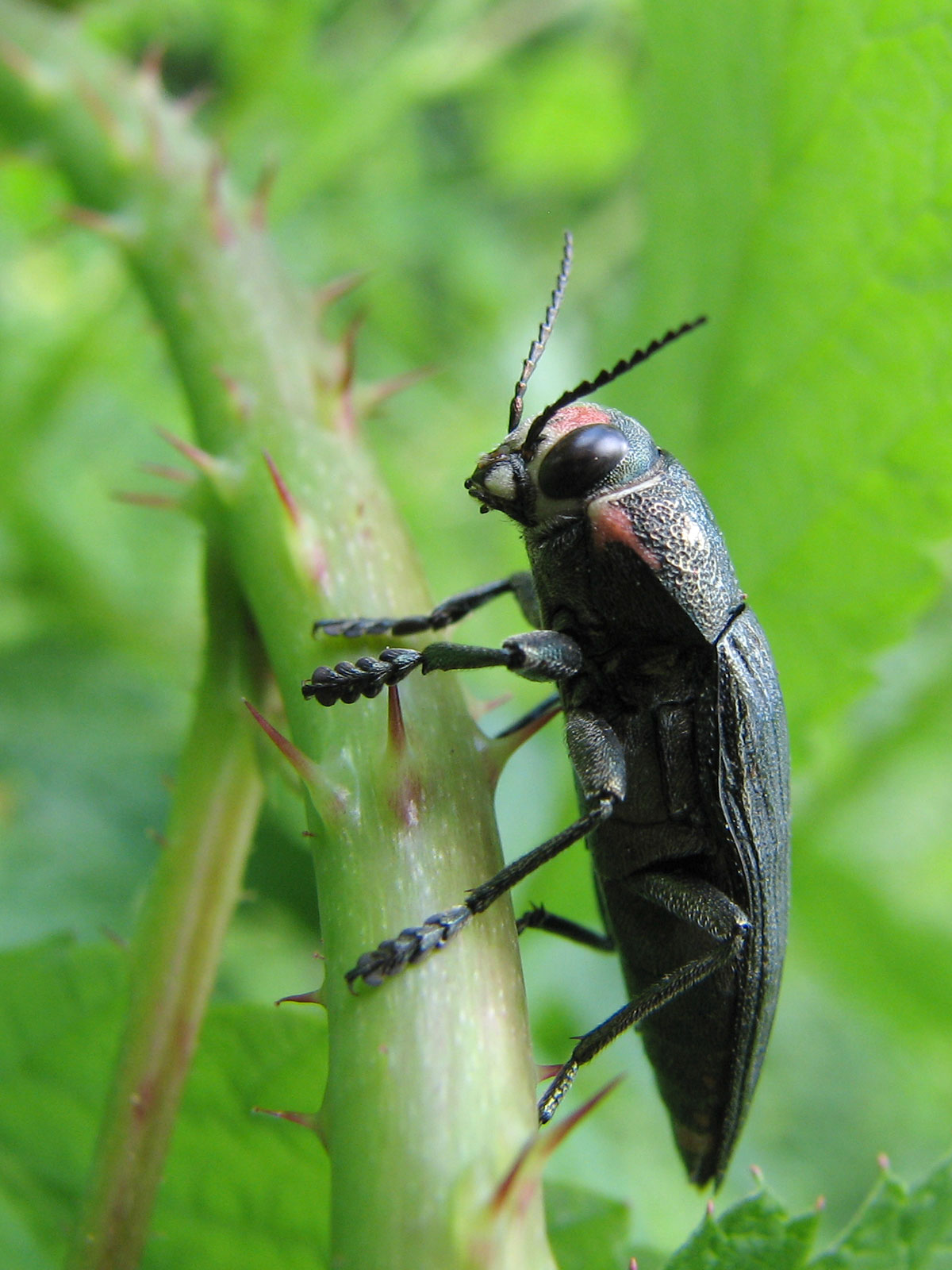

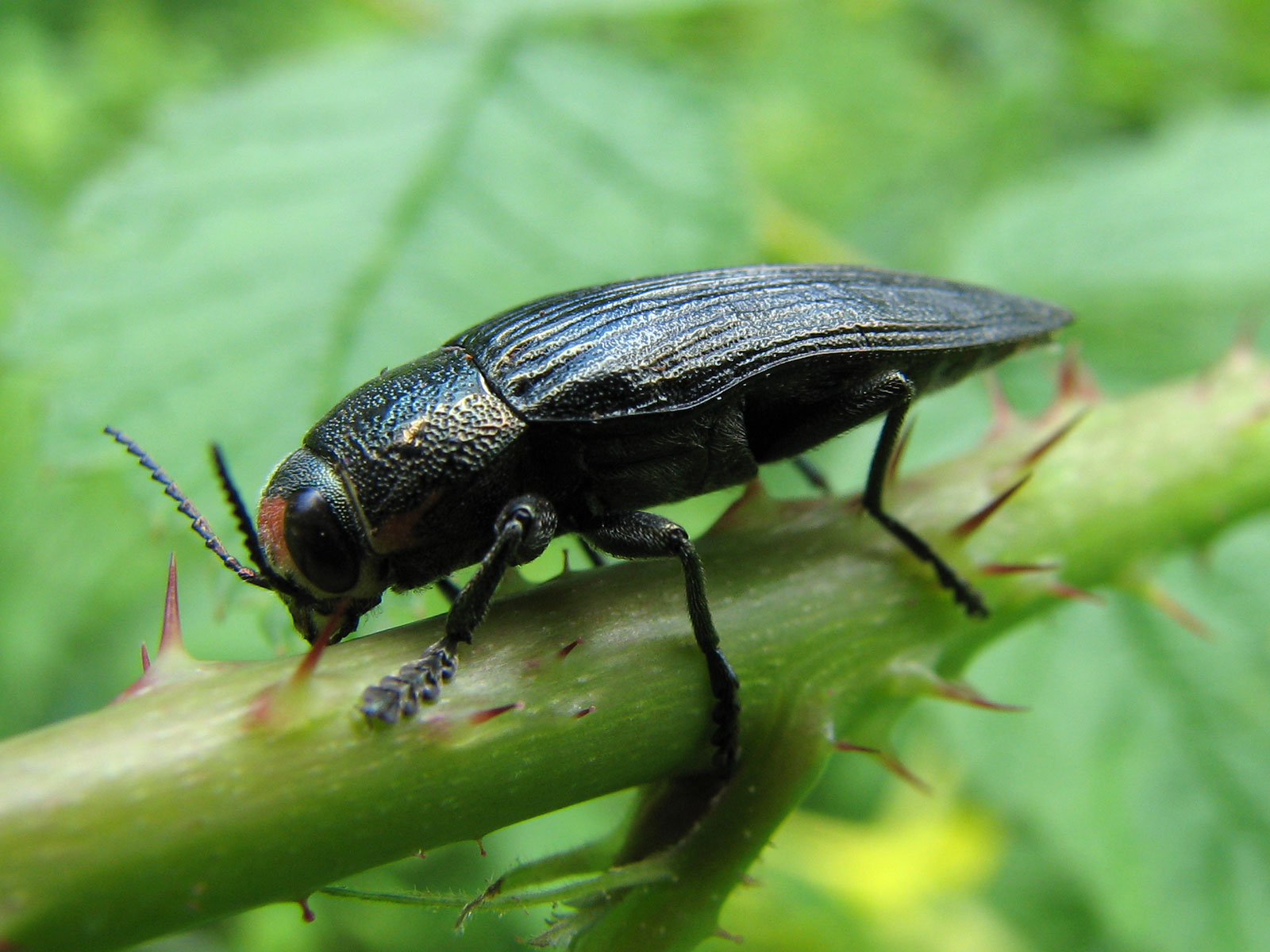
