= Buprestis connexa =

Scientific classification
- Domain: Eukaryota
- Kingdom: Animalia
- Phylum: Arthropoda
- Class: Insecta
- Order: Coleoptera
- Suborder: Polyphaga
- Infraorder: Elateriformia
- Family: Buprestidae
- Genus: Buprestis
- Species: B. connexa

Binomial name
- Buprestis connexa Horn, 1875

Species of beetle

Buprestis connexa is a species of metallic wood-boring beetle in the family Buprestidae. It is found in North America.
