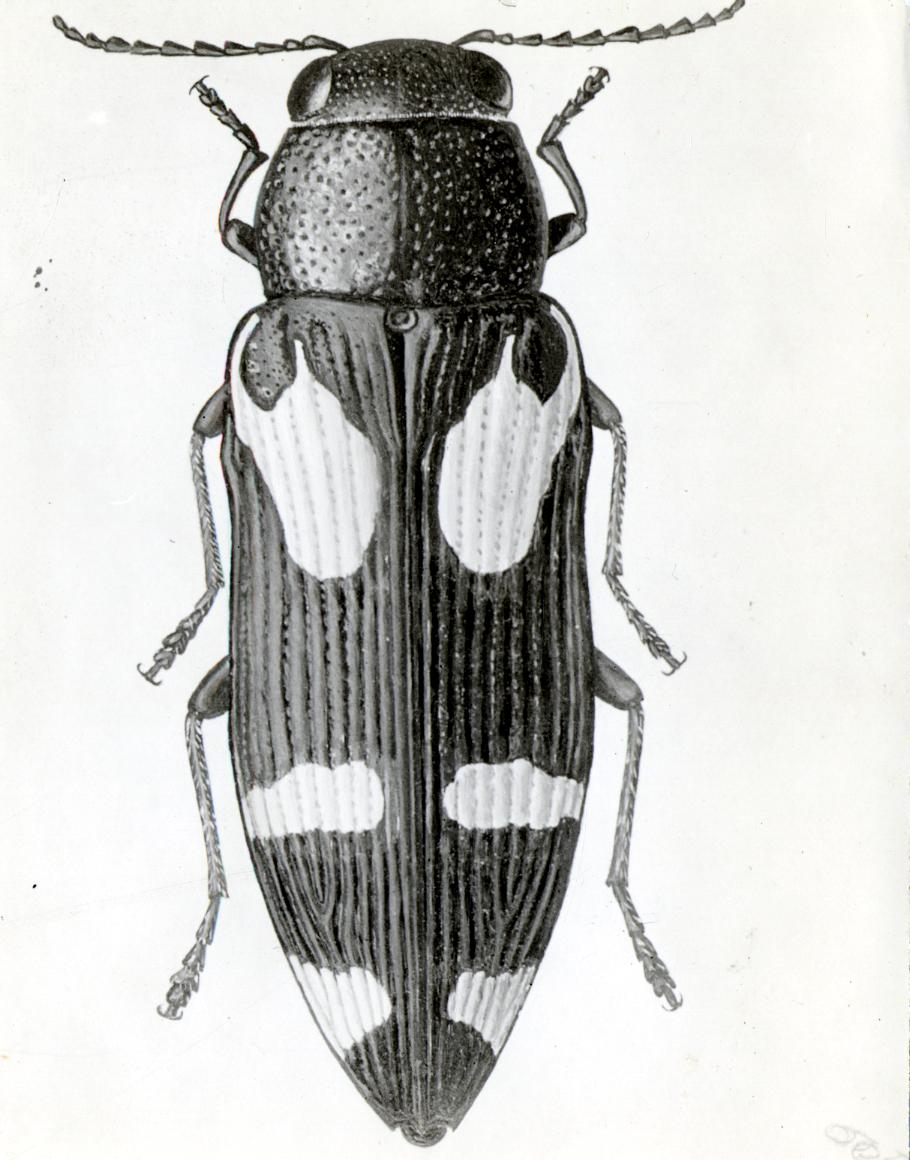

Scientific classification
- Domain: Eukaryota
- Kingdom: Animalia
- Phylum: Arthropoda
- Class: Insecta
- Order: Coleoptera
- Suborder: Polyphaga
- Infraorder: Elateriformia
- Family: Buprestidae
- Genus: Buprestis
- Species: B. gibbsii

Binomial name
- Buprestis gibbsii (LeConte, 1857)

= Buprestis gibbsii =

Species of beetle

Buprestis gibbsii is a species of metallic wood-boring beetle in the family Buprestidae. It is found in North America.
