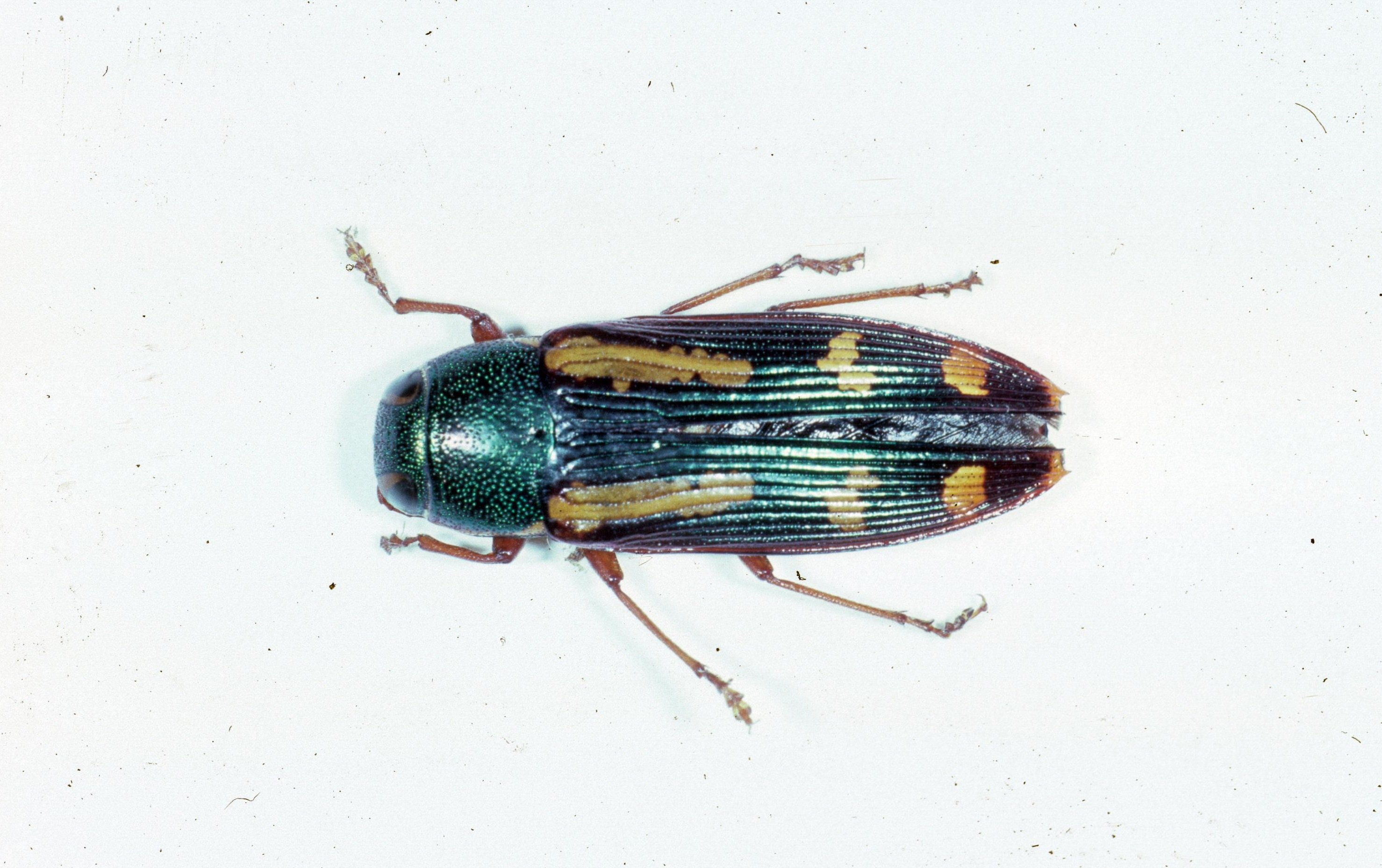
- Adult

Scientific classification
- Kingdom: Animalia
- Phylum: Arthropoda
- Clade: Pancrustacea
- Class: Insecta
- Order: Coleoptera
- Suborder: Polyphaga
- Infraorder: Elateriformia
- Family: Buprestidae
- Genus: Buprestis
- Species: B. rufipes

Binomial name
- Buprestis rufipes Olivier, 1790

= Buprestis rufipes =

Species of beetle

Buprestis rufipes, the red-legged buprestis, is a green metallic wood boring beetle native to southern and eastern United States in North America. Little is known about this beetle. It apparently inhabits dead or dying hardwood in its adult phase.

== Description ==
Buprestis rufipes adults are 18 to 25mm. It is easily recognizable with golden yellow bands on a metallic green elytron. The metallic green color extends to the head and underparts. The legs and part of the underparts are reddish as reflected in the specific name.

== Ecology ==
There are no recorded larval host-plants. Reported adult host-plants are Acer (Maple), Fagus (Beech), Nyssa sylvatica (Blackgum), Quercus (Oak), and Ulmus (Elm). Adult B. rufipes apparently inhabit dead or dying wood.

== See also ==
- Woodboring beetle
