= Buprestis decora =

Scientific classification
- Domain: Eukaryota
- Kingdom: Animalia
- Phylum: Arthropoda
- Class: Insecta
- Order: Coleoptera
- Suborder: Polyphaga
- Infraorder: Elateriformia
- Family: Buprestidae
- Genus: Buprestis
- Species: B. decora

Binomial name
- Buprestis decora Fabricius, 1775

Species of beetle

Buprestis decora is a species of metallic wood-boring beetle in the family Buprestidae. It is found in the Caribbean Sea and North America.
