= Buprestis laeviventris =

Scientific classification
- Domain: Eukaryota
- Kingdom: Animalia
- Phylum: Arthropoda
- Class: Insecta
- Order: Coleoptera
- Suborder: Polyphaga
- Infraorder: Elateriformia
- Family: Buprestidae
- Genus: Buprestis
- Species: B. laeviventris

Binomial name
- Buprestis laeviventris (LeConte, 1857)

Synonyms
- Buprestis pugetana Casey, 1909

Species of beetle

Buprestis laeviventris is a species of metallic wood-boring beetle in the family Buprestidae. It is found in North America.

== Subspecies ==
These two subspecies belong to the species Buprestis laeviventris:

- Buprestis laeviventris laeviventris
- Buprestis laeviventris pugetana Casey
