= Buprestis subornata =

Scientific classification
- Domain: Eukaryota
- Kingdom: Animalia
- Phylum: Arthropoda
- Class: Insecta
- Order: Coleoptera
- Suborder: Polyphaga
- Infraorder: Elateriformia
- Family: Buprestidae
- Genus: Buprestis
- Species: B. subornata

Binomial name
- Buprestis subornata (LeConte, 1860)

Synonyms
- Buprestis adonea Casey, 1909; Buprestis histrio Casey, 1909; Buprestis punctiventris Casey, 1909; Buprestis rubronotans Casey, 1909; Buprestis violescens Casey, 1909

Species of beetle

Buprestis subornata is a species of metallic wood-boring beetle in the family Buprestidae. It is found in North America.

== Subspecies ==
These two subspecies belong to the species Buprestis subornata:

- Buprestis subornata punctiventris Casey
- Buprestis subornata subornata
