= Buprestis consularis =

Scientific classification
- Domain: Eukaryota
- Kingdom: Animalia
- Phylum: Arthropoda
- Class: Insecta
- Order: Coleoptera
- Suborder: Polyphaga
- Infraorder: Elateriformia
- Family: Buprestidae
- Genus: Buprestis
- Species: B. consularis

Binomial name
- Buprestis consularis Gory, 1840

Synonyms
- Buprestis flavopicta Casey, 1909

Species of beetle

Buprestis consularis is a species of metallic wood-boring beetle in the family Buprestidae. It is found in North America.
