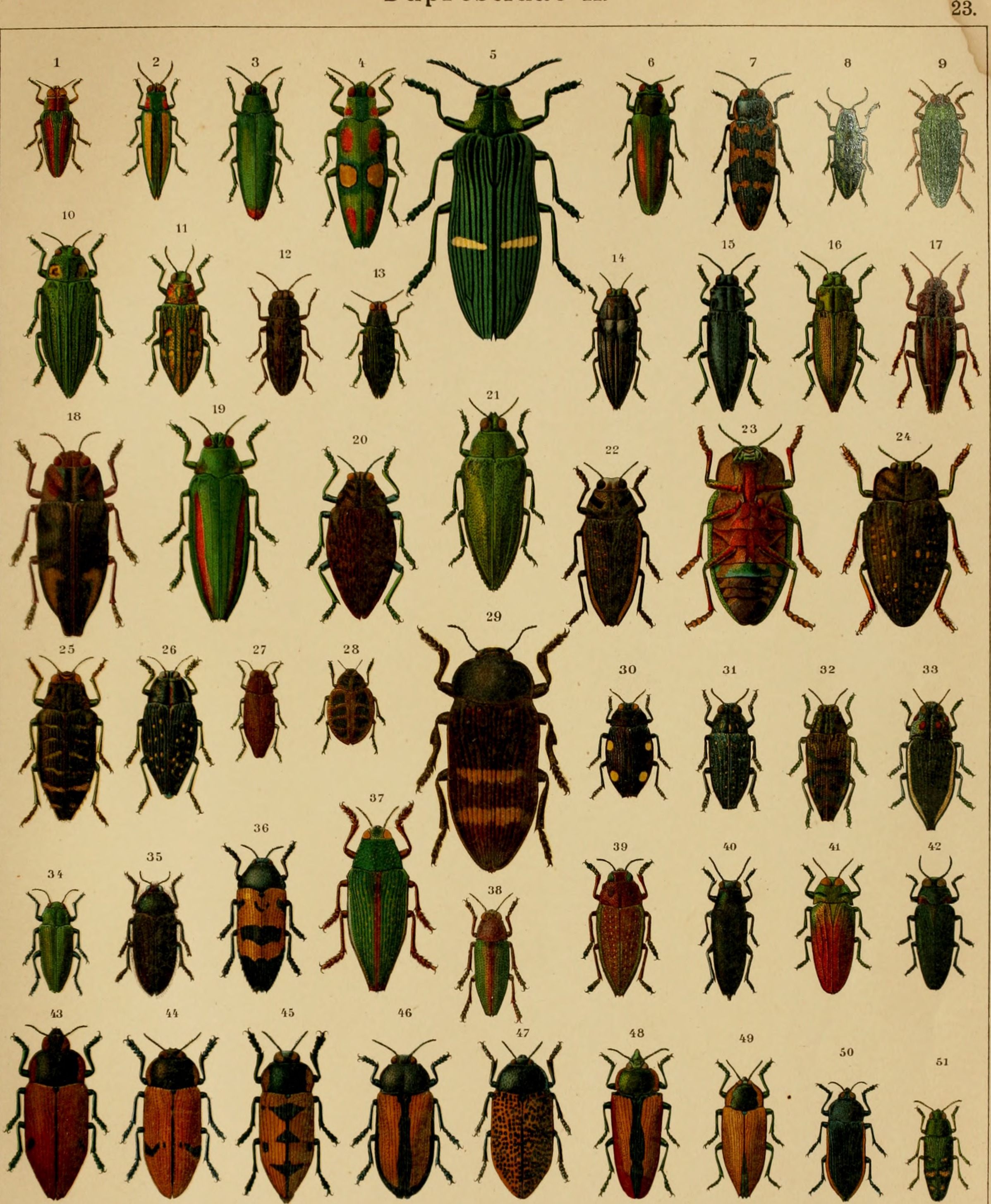

Scientific classification
- Kingdom: Animalia
- Phylum: Arthropoda
- Clade: Pancrustacea
- Class: Insecta
- Order: Coleoptera
- Suborder: Polyphaga
- Infraorder: Elateriformia
- Family: Buprestidae
- Genus: Buprestis
- Species: B. fasciata

Binomial name
- Buprestis fasciata Fabricius, 1787

Synonyms
- Buprestis fortunata Casey, 1909; Buprestis fulgens Casey, 1909; Buprestis lherminieri (Chevrolat, 1838); Buprestis saturata Casey, 1909; Buprestis sexmaculata Hausmann, 1799; Buprestis sexplagiata (LeConte, 1860)

= Buprestis fasciata =

Species of beetle

Buprestis fasciata is a species of metallic wood-boring beetle in the family Buprestidae. It is found in the Caribbean Sea and North America.

== Subspecies ==
These two subspecies belong to the species Buprestis fasciata:

- Buprestis fasciata fasciata
- Buprestis fasciata fortunata Casey
