= Buprestis nutalli =

Scientific classification
- Domain: Eukaryota
- Kingdom: Animalia
- Phylum: Arthropoda
- Class: Insecta
- Order: Coleoptera
- Suborder: Polyphaga
- Infraorder: Elateriformia
- Family: Buprestidae
- Genus: Buprestis
- Species: B. nutalli

Binomial name
- Buprestis nutalli Kirby, 1837

Synonyms
- Buprestis alternans (LeConte, 1860); Buprestis boulderensis Casey, 1909; Buprestis conicicauda Casey, 1909; Buprestis contorta Casey, 1909; Buprestis diruptans Casey, 1909; Buprestis gravidula Casey, 1909; Buprestis torva Casey, 1909

Species of beetle

Buprestis nutalli is a species of metallic wood-boring beetle in the family Buprestidae. It is found in North America.
