= Buprestis parmaculativentris =

Scientific classification
- Domain: Eukaryota
- Kingdom: Animalia
- Phylum: Arthropoda
- Class: Insecta
- Order: Coleoptera
- Suborder: Polyphaga
- Infraorder: Elateriformia
- Family: Buprestidae
- Genus: Buprestis
- Species: B. parmaculativentris

Binomial name
- Buprestis parmaculativentris Knull, 1958

Species of beetle

Buprestis parmaculativentris is a species of metallic wood-boring beetle in the family Buprestidae. It is endemic to Texas and known from the Chisos Mountains in the Big Bend National Park. It is a robust beetle 16.5 mm (0.65 in) long.
