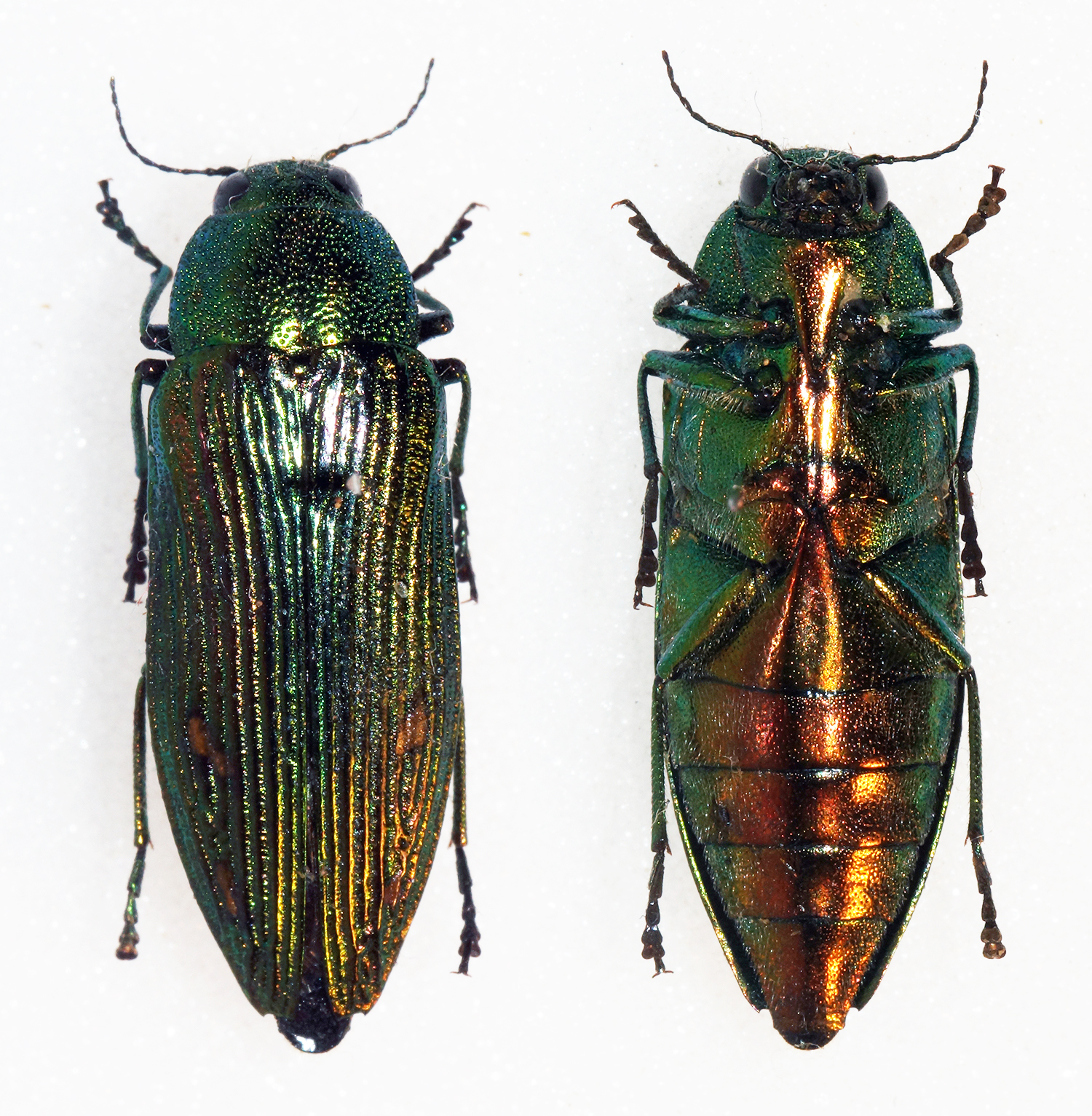

Scientific classification
- Domain: Eukaryota
- Kingdom: Animalia
- Phylum: Arthropoda
- Class: Insecta
- Order: Coleoptera
- Suborder: Polyphaga
- Infraorder: Elateriformia
- Family: Buprestidae
- Genus: Buprestis
- Species: B. langii

Binomial name
- Buprestis langii Mannerheim, 1843

Synonyms
- Buprestis angusta Casey, 1909; Buprestis bistrinotata Casey, 1909; Buprestis callida Casey, 1909; Buprestis crenata Casey, 1909; Buprestis depressa Casey, 1909; Buprestis fastidiosa Casey, 1909; Buprestis graminea Casey, 1909; Buprestis incolumis Casey, 1909; Buprestis leviceps Casey, 1909; Buprestis mediocris Casey, 1909; Buprestis obliqua Casey, 1909; Buprestis oregona Casey, 1909; Buprestis ornata Walker, 1866; Buprestis patruelis Casey, 1909; Buprestis seditiosa Casey, 1909; Buprestis viridimicans Casey, 1909

= Buprestis langii =

Species of beetle

Buprestis langii is a species of metallic wood-boring beetles in the family Buprestidae. It is found in North America.
