= Buprestis apricans =

Scientific classification
- Kingdom: Animalia
- Phylum: Arthropoda
- Class: Insecta
- Order: Coleoptera
- Suborder: Polyphaga
- Infraorder: Elateriformia
- Family: Buprestidae
- Genus: Buprestis
- Species: B. apricans

Binomial name
- Buprestis apricans Herbst, 1801

Synonyms
- Buprestis bosci Laporte and Gory, 1837; Buprestis cribripennis Casey, 1909

Species of beetle

Buprestis apricans, the turpentine borer, is a species of metallic wood-boring beetle in the family Buprestidae. It is found in the Caribbean and North America.
