= Buprestis salisburyensis =

Scientific classification
- Kingdom: Animalia
- Phylum: Arthropoda
- Class: Insecta
- Order: Coleoptera
- Suborder: Polyphaga
- Infraorder: Elateriformia
- Family: Buprestidae
- Genus: Buprestis
- Species: B. salisburyensis

Binomial name
- Buprestis salisburyensis Herbst, 1801

Synonyms
- Buprestis cazieri Helfer, 1946; Buprestis ultramarina Say, 1833

Species of beetle

Buprestis salisburyensis is a species of metallic wood-boring beetle in the family Buprestidae. It is found in North America.
