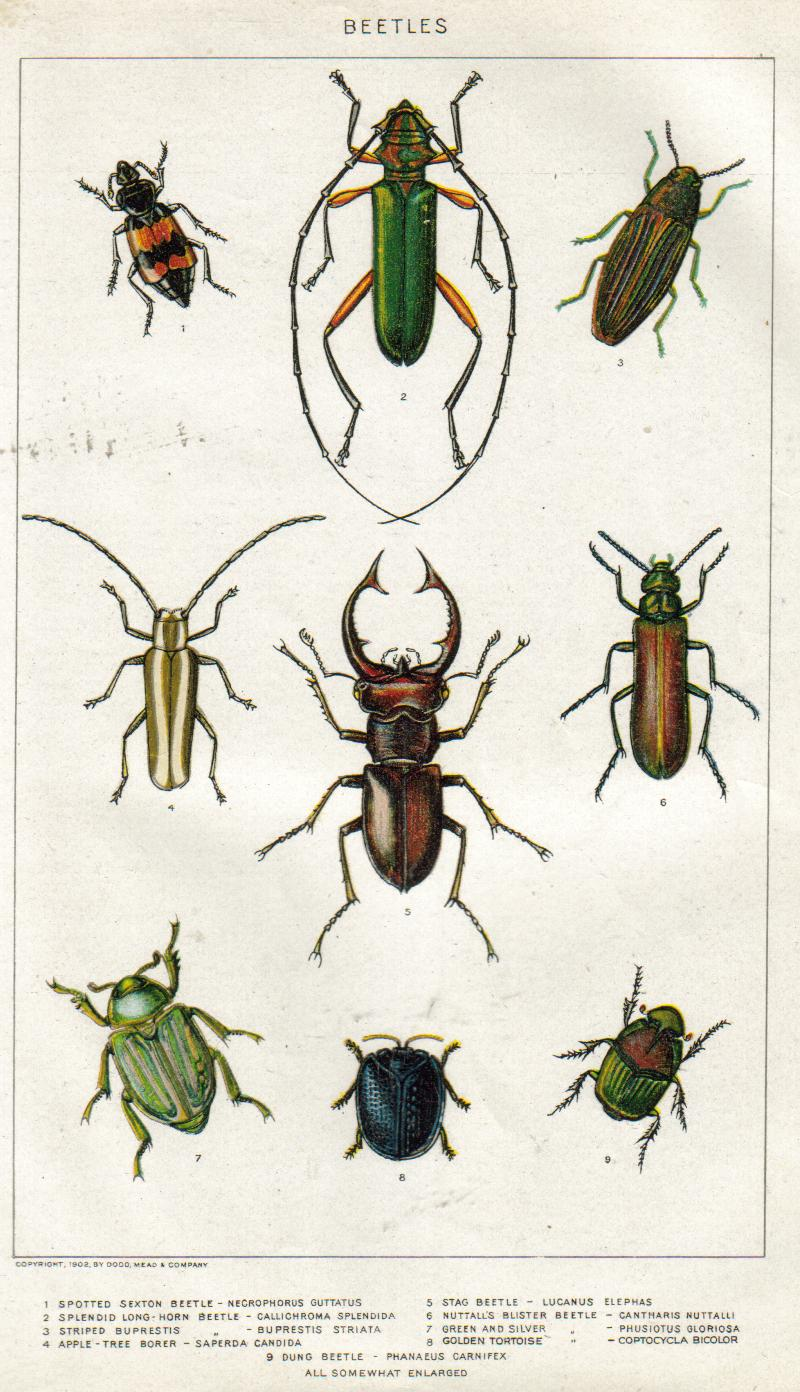

Scientific classification
- Domain: Eukaryota
- Kingdom: Animalia
- Phylum: Arthropoda
- Class: Insecta
- Order: Coleoptera
- Suborder: Polyphaga
- Infraorder: Elateriformia
- Family: Buprestidae
- Genus: Buprestis
- Species: B. striata

Binomial name
- Buprestis striata Fabricius, 1775

Synonyms
- Buprestis canadensis Casey, 1909; Buprestis impedita Say, 1833; Buprestis obscura Casey, 1909

= Buprestis striata =

Species of beetle

Buprestis striata is a species of metallic wood-boring beetle in the family Buprestidae. It is found in the Caribbean Sea and North America.
