= Buprestis confluenta =

Scientific classification
- Domain: Eukaryota
- Kingdom: Animalia
- Phylum: Arthropoda
- Class: Insecta
- Order: Coleoptera
- Suborder: Polyphaga
- Infraorder: Elateriformia
- Family: Buprestidae
- Genus: Buprestis
- Species: B. confluenta

Binomial name
- Buprestis confluenta Say, 1823

Synonyms
- Buprestis tesselata Casey, 1909

Species of beetle

Buprestis confluenta is a species of metallic wood-boring beetle in the family Buprestidae. It is found in North America.

== Subspecies ==
These two subspecies belong to the species Buprestis confluenta:

- Buprestis confluenta confluenta
- Buprestis confluenta tessellata Casey
