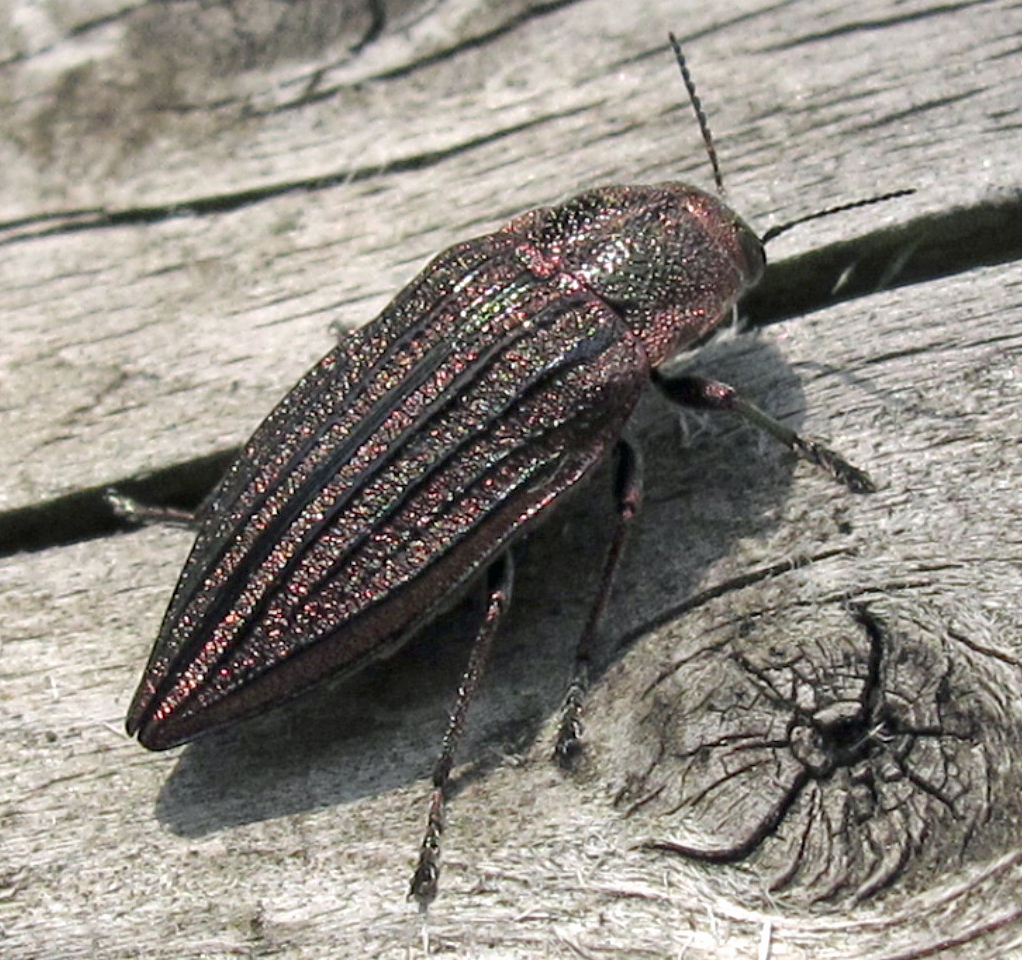

Scientific classification
- Domain: Eukaryota
- Kingdom: Animalia
- Phylum: Arthropoda
- Class: Insecta
- Order: Coleoptera
- Suborder: Polyphaga
- Infraorder: Elateriformia
- Family: Buprestidae
- Genus: Buprestis
- Species: B. sulcicollis

Binomial name
- Buprestis sulcicollis (LeConte, 1860)

Synonyms
- Buprestis lateralis Casey, 1909

= Buprestis sulcicollis =

Species of beetle

Buprestis sulcicollis is a species of metallic wood-boring beetle in the family Buprestidae. It is found in North America.
