= Buprestis maculipennis =

Scientific classification
- Domain: Eukaryota
- Kingdom: Animalia
- Phylum: Arthropoda
- Class: Insecta
- Order: Coleoptera
- Suborder: Polyphaga
- Infraorder: Elateriformia
- Family: Buprestidae
- Genus: Buprestis
- Species: B. maculipennis

Binomial name
- Buprestis maculipennis Gory, 1840

Synonyms
- Buprestis deficiens Casey, 1909; Buprestis fusiformis Casey, 1909; Buprestis inconstans Melsheimer, 1845; Buprestis leporina Casey, 1909; Buprestis reducta Casey, 1909; Buprestis scripta Casey, 1909

Species of beetle

Buprestis maculipennis is a species of metallic wood-boring beetle in the family Buprestidae. It is found in North America.

== Subspecies ==
These three subspecies belong to the species Buprestis maculipennis:

- Buprestis maculipennis deficiens Casey
- Buprestis maculipennis fusiformis Casey
- Buprestis maculipennis maculipennis
