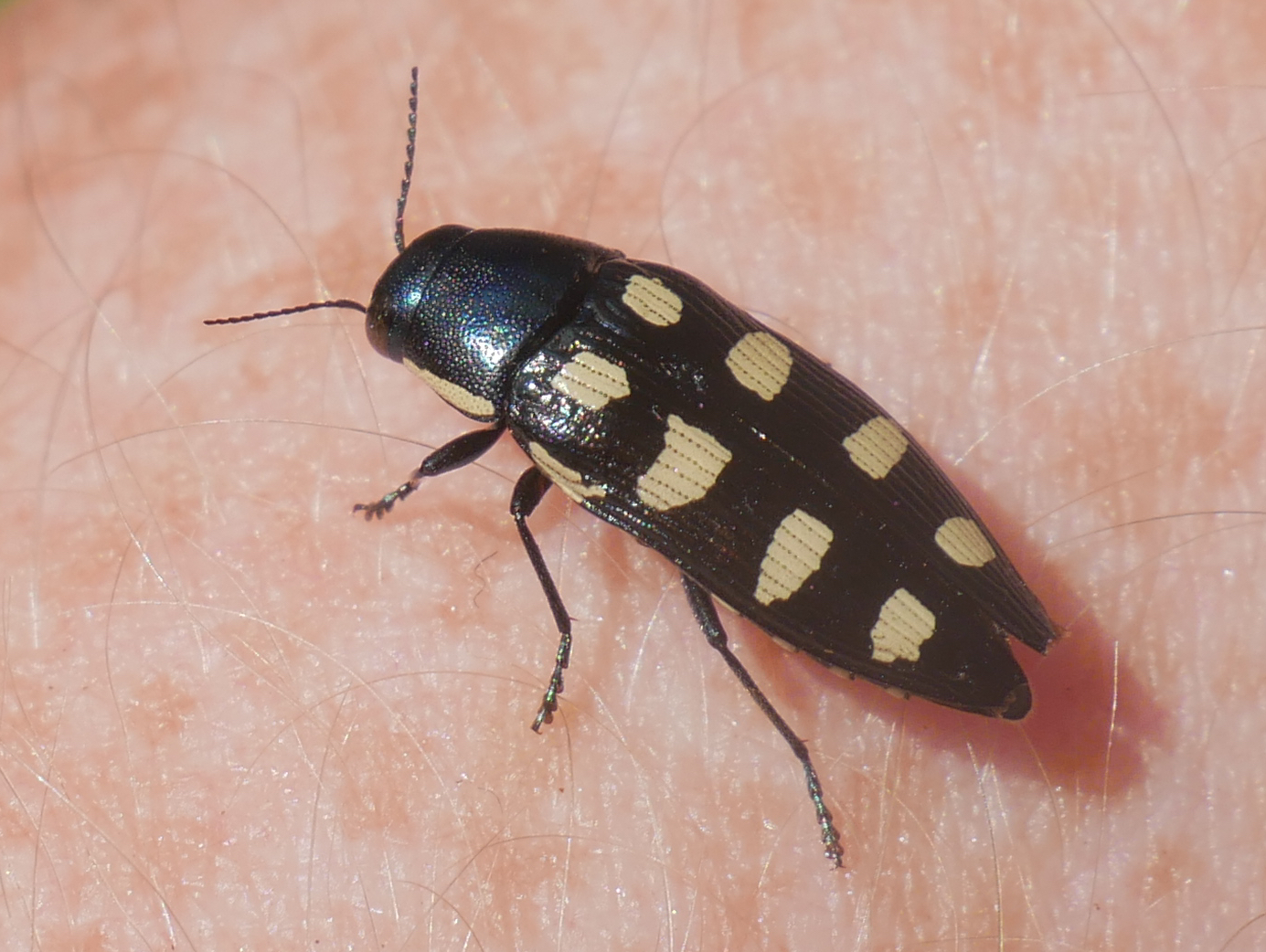

Scientific classification
- Kingdom: Animalia
- Phylum: Arthropoda
- Class: Insecta
- Order: Coleoptera
- Suborder: Polyphaga
- Infraorder: Elateriformia
- Family: Buprestidae
- Genus: Buprestis
- Species: B. octoguttata

Binomial name
- Buprestis octoguttata Linnaeus, 1758

= Buprestis octoguttata =

Species of beetle

Buprestis octoguttata, commonly known as the eight-spotted jewel beetle, is a species of beetle native to Europe.
