= Buprestis viridisuturalis =

Scientific classification
- Domain: Eukaryota
- Kingdom: Animalia
- Phylum: Arthropoda
- Class: Insecta
- Order: Coleoptera
- Suborder: Polyphaga
- Infraorder: Elateriformia
- Family: Buprestidae
- Genus: Buprestis
- Species: B. viridisuturalis

Binomial name
- Buprestis viridisuturalis Nicolay & Weiss, 1918

Synonyms
- Buprestis lesnei Garnett, 1922

Species of beetle

Buprestis viridisuturalis is a species of metallic wood-boring beetle in the family Buprestidae. It is found in North America.
