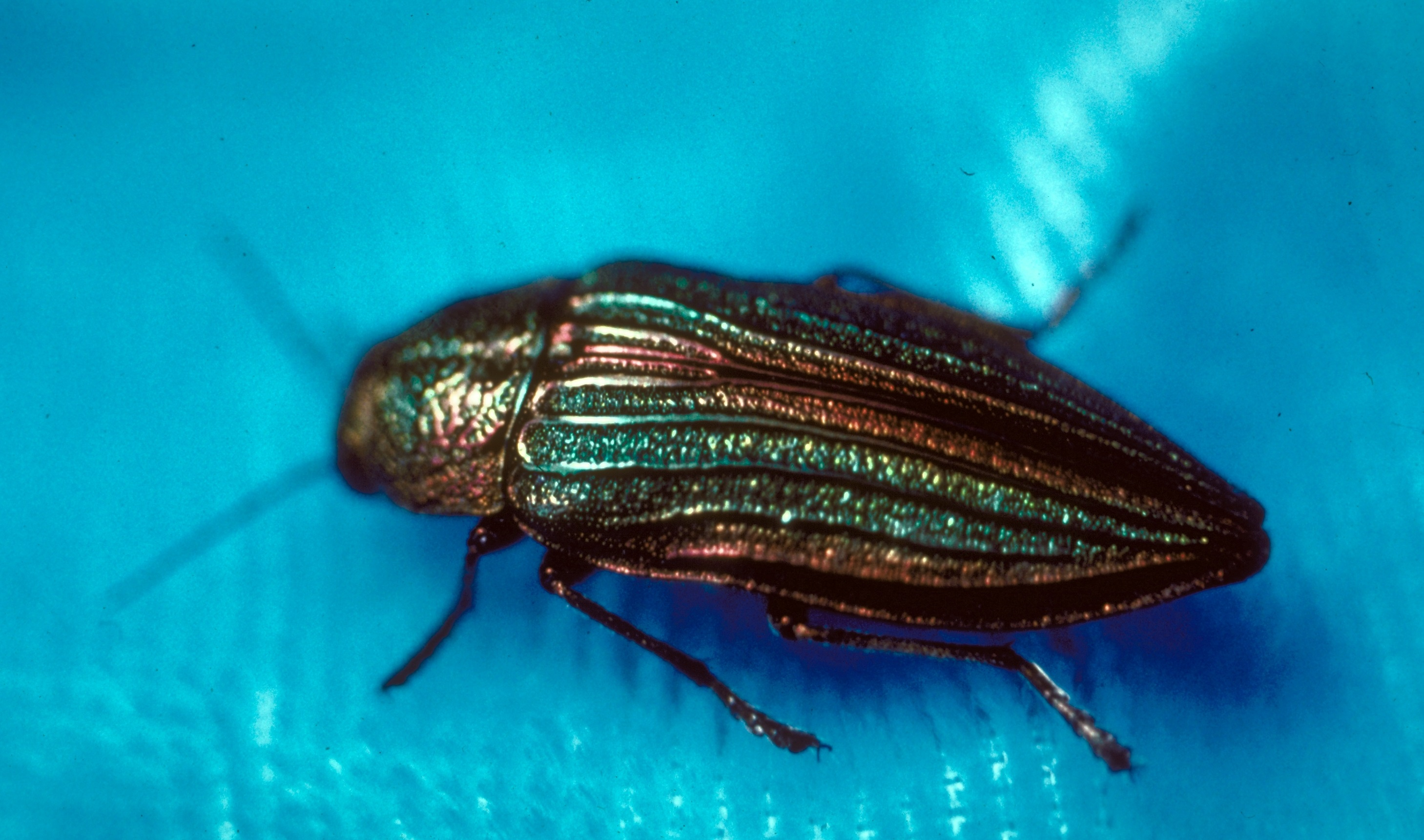
- Buprestis aurulenta
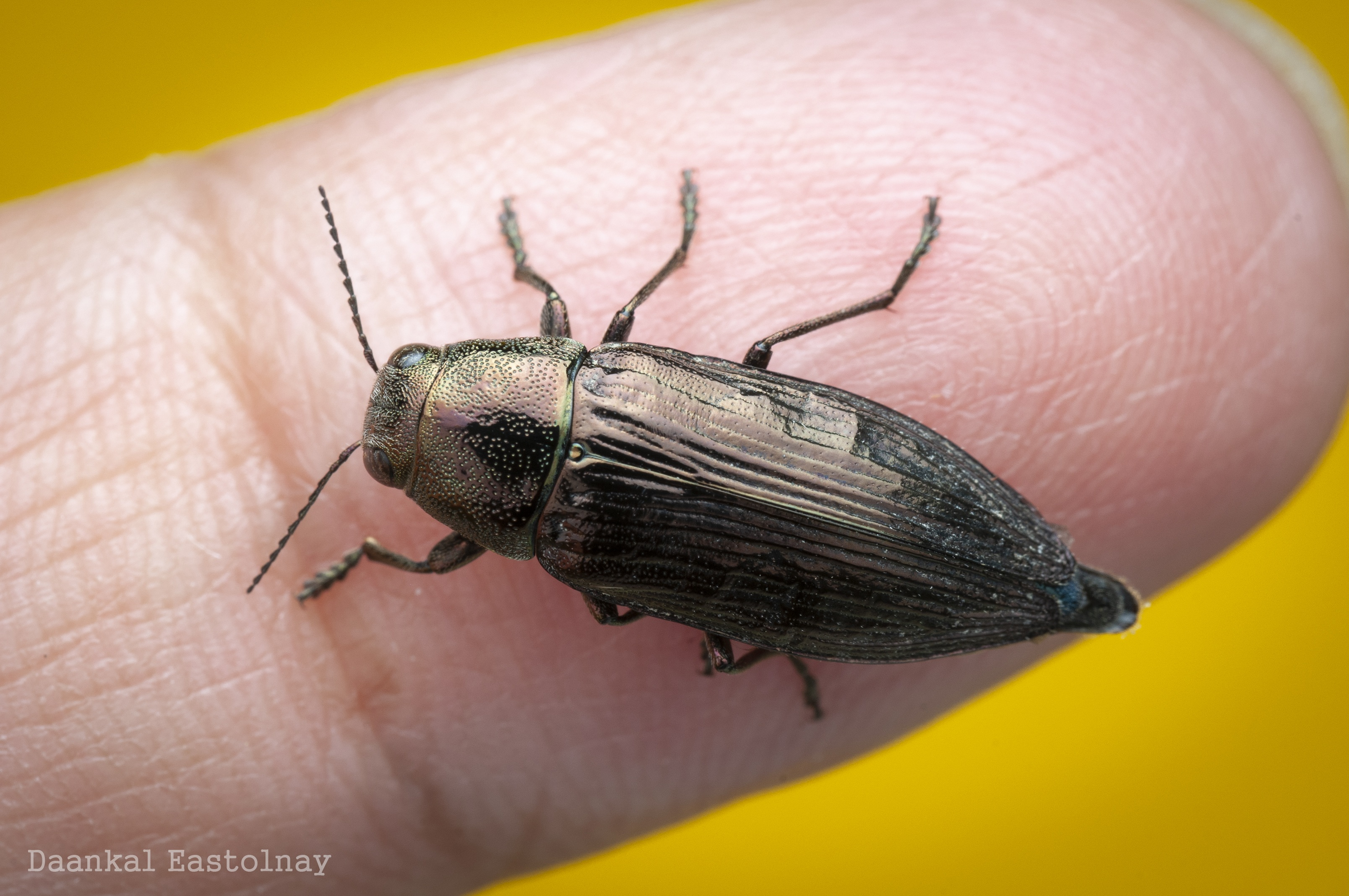
- Buprestis (Ancylocheira) haemorrhoidalis japanensis, Adult, South Korea

Scientific classification
- Kingdom: Animalia
- Phylum: Arthropoda
- Clade: Pancrustacea
- Class: Insecta
- Order: Coleoptera
- Suborder: Polyphaga
- Infraorder: Elateriformia
- Family: Buprestidae
- Subfamily: Buprestinae
- Tribe: Buprestini
- Genus: Buprestis; Linnaeus, 1758

= Buprestis =

Genus of beetles

Buprestis is a genus of beetles in the tribe Buprestini, the jewel beetles. As of 2011 there were 78 described species distributed across most of the world's biogeographic realms except parts of Africa and Antarctica.

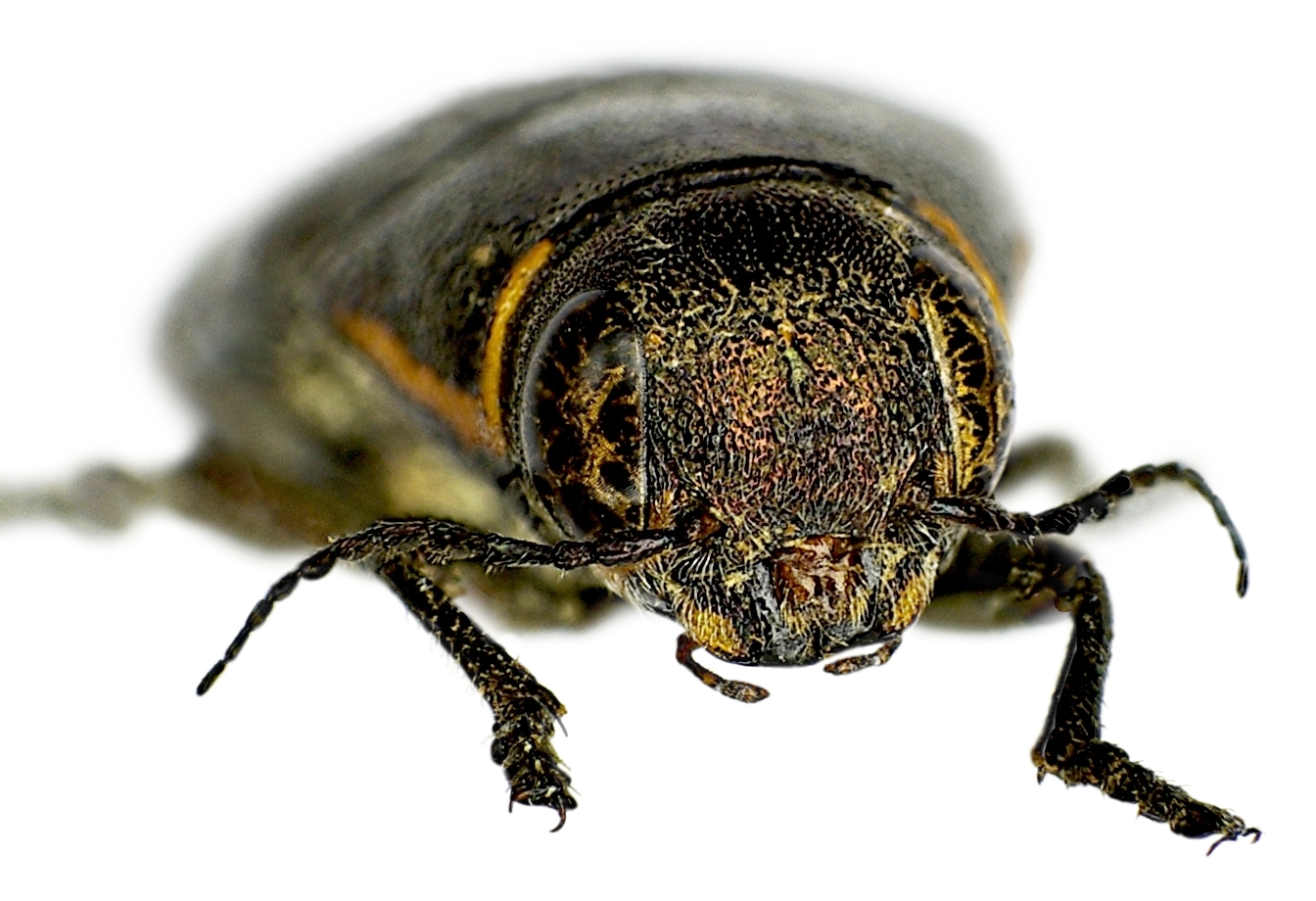
Buprestis dalmatina

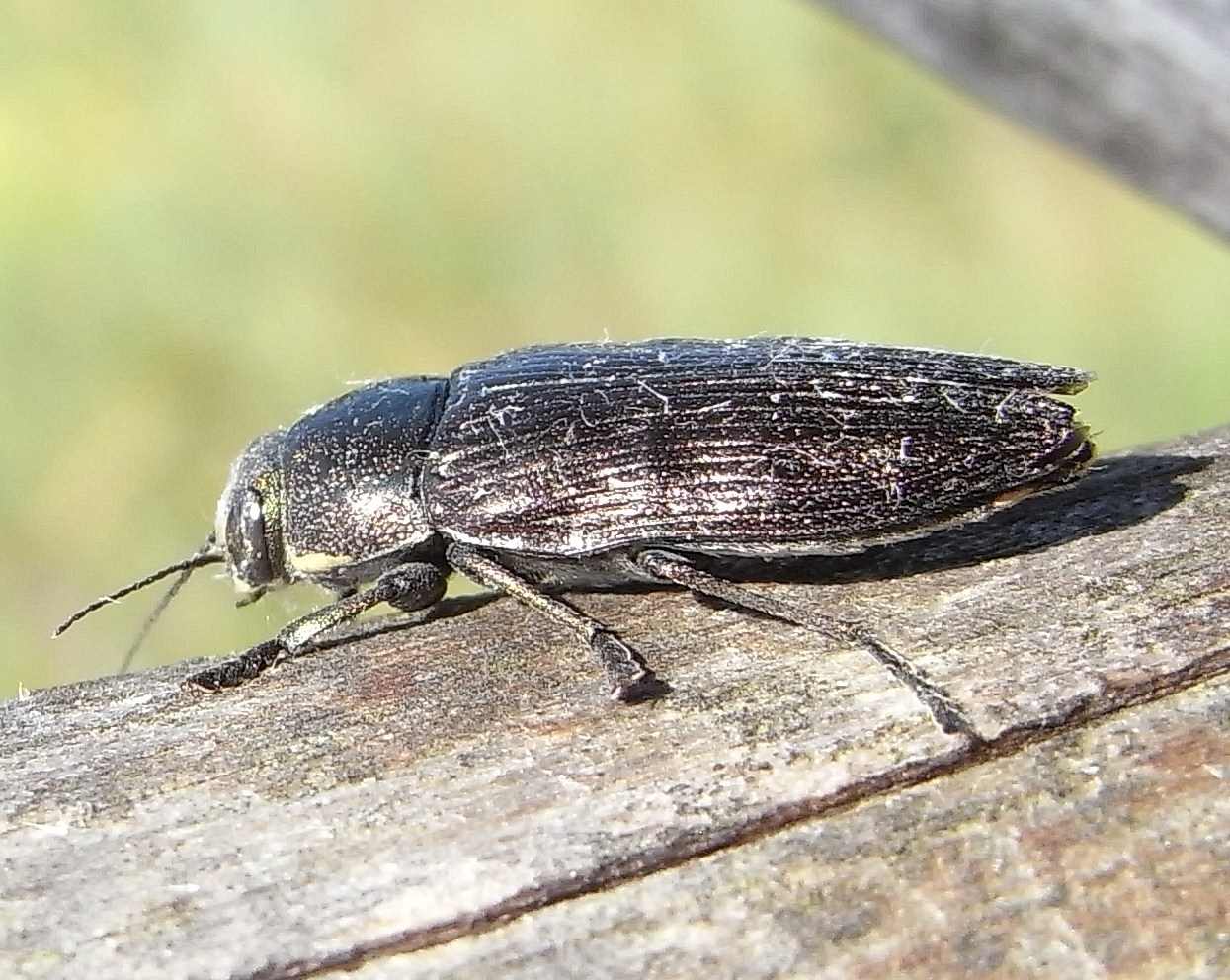
Buprestis haemorrhoidalis

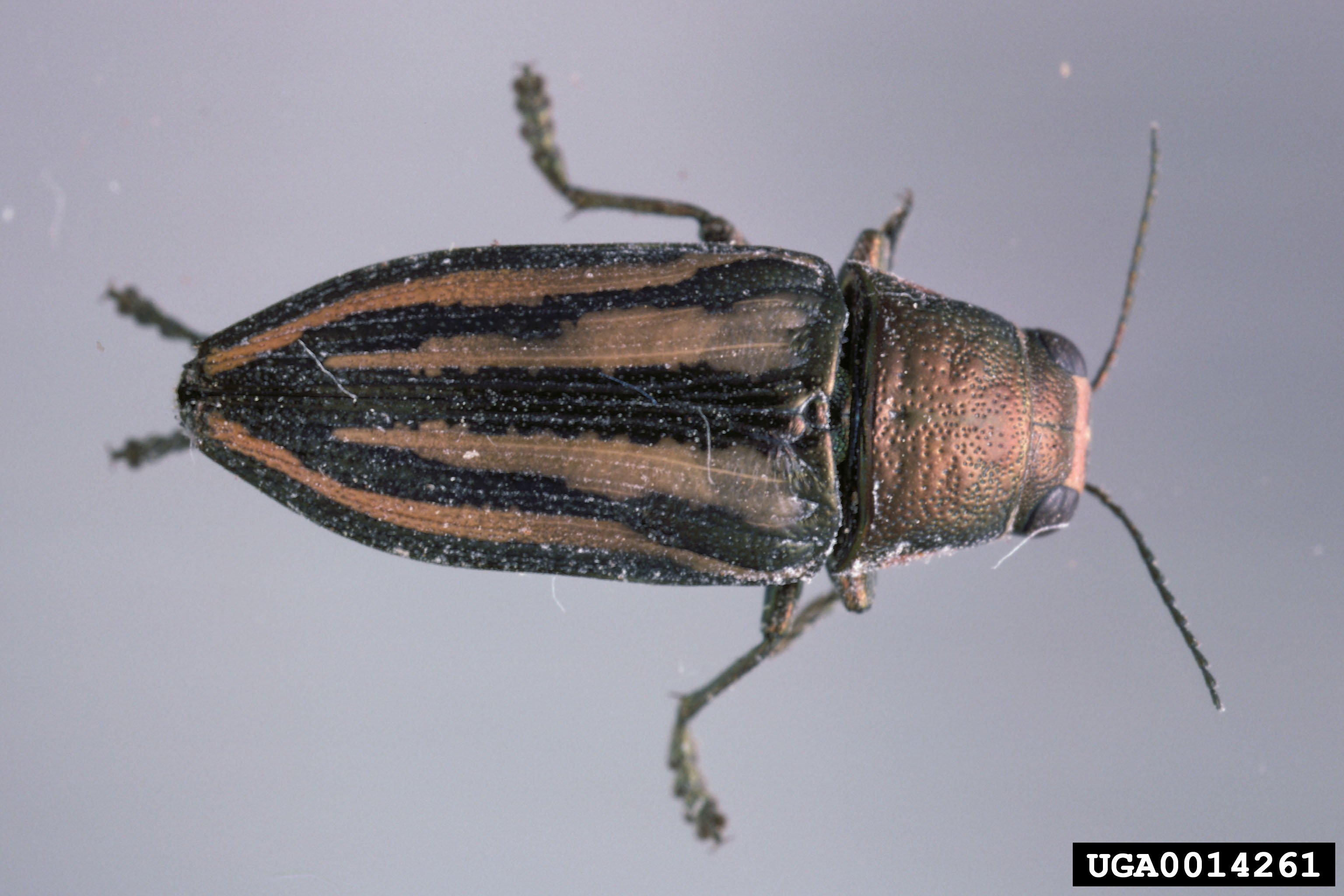
Buprestis lineata

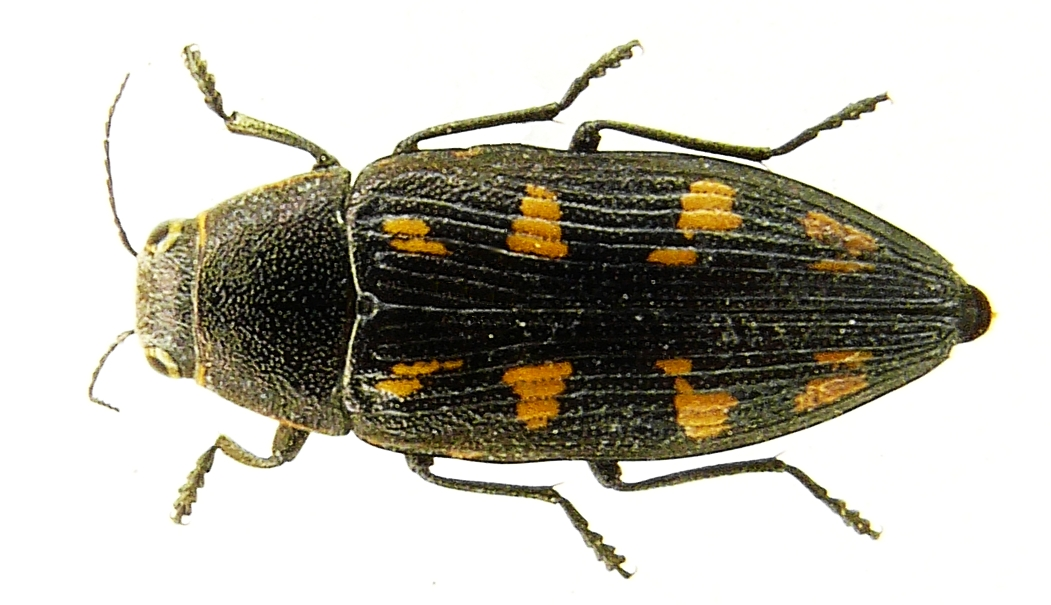
Buprestis novemmaculata

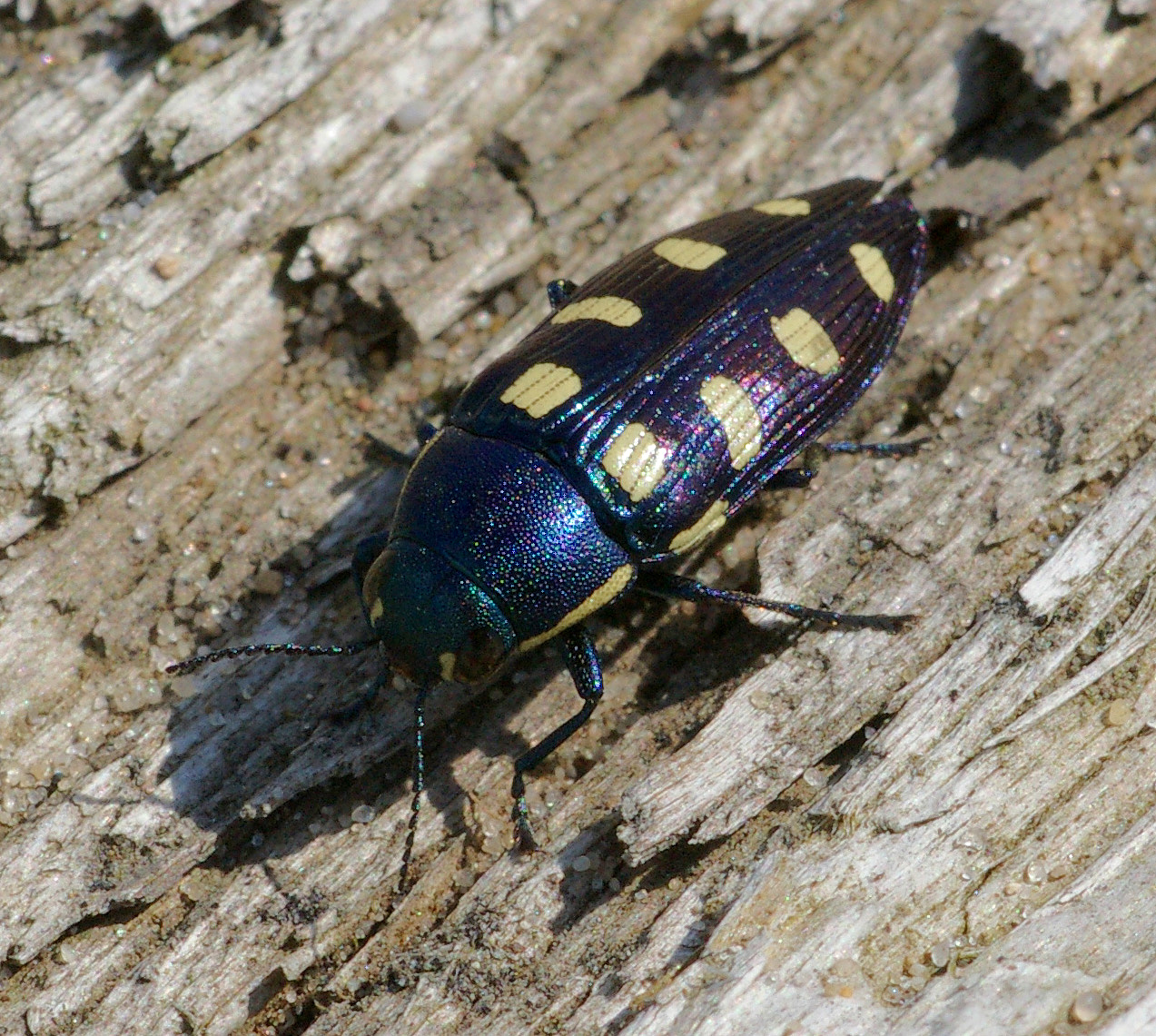
Buprestis octoguttata

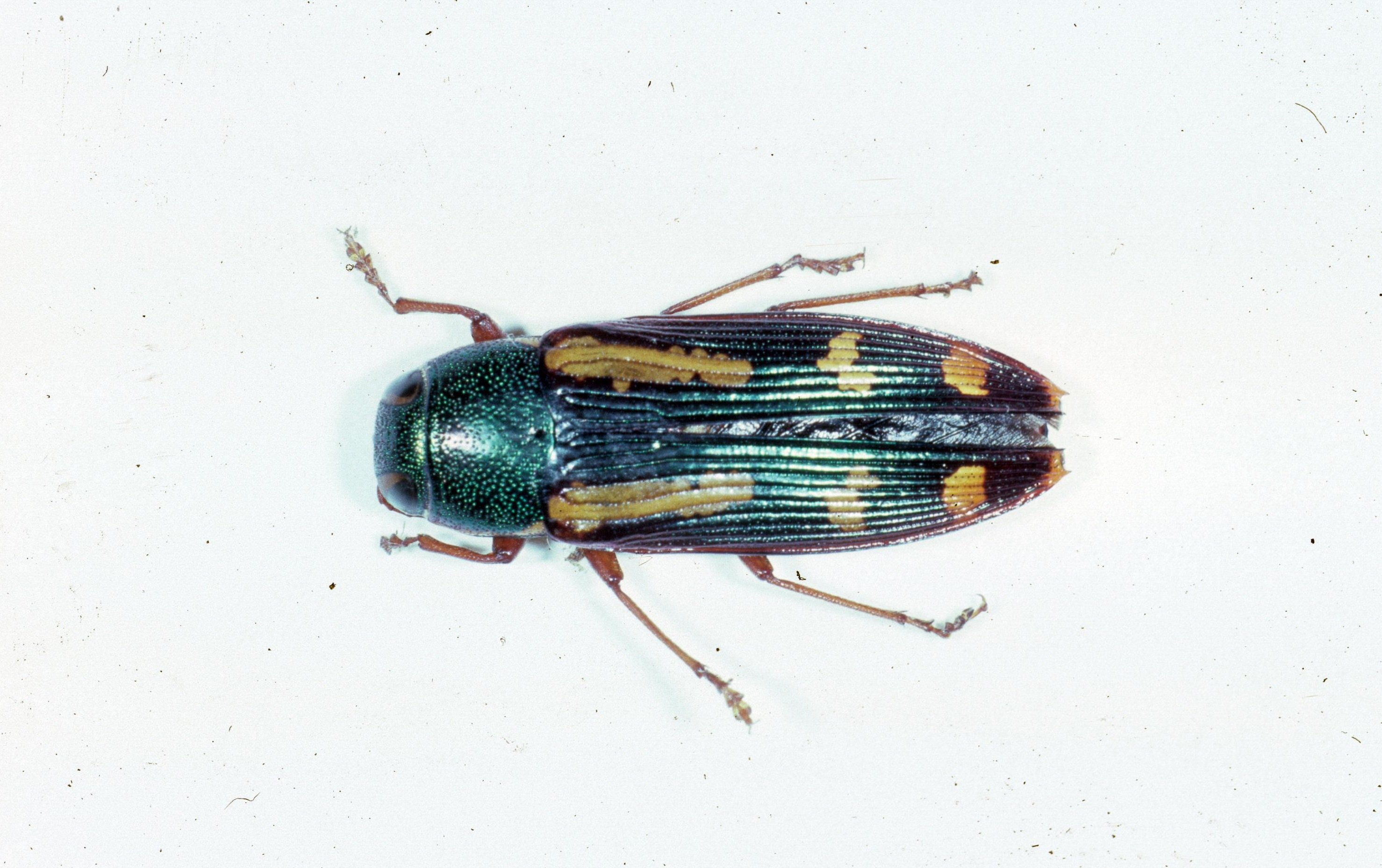
Buprestis rufipes

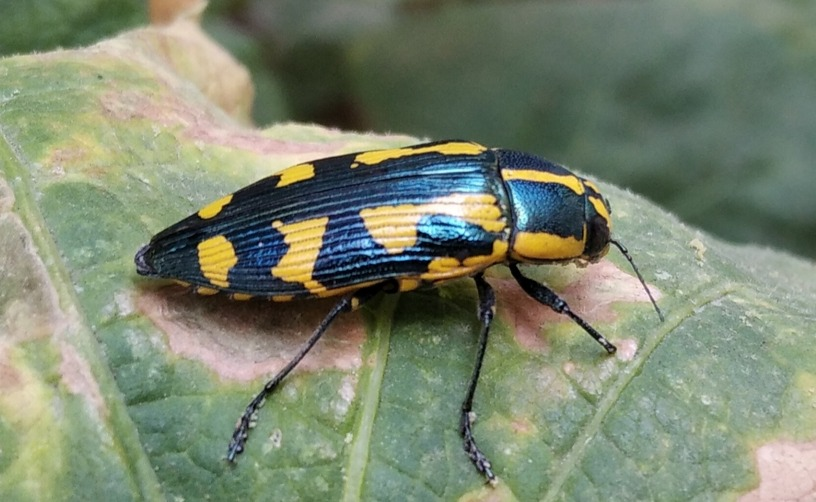
Buprestis salomonii

Species include:

- Buprestis adjecta (LeConte, 1854)
- Buprestis aetnensis Baviera & Sparacio, 2002
- Buprestis alemanica (Heer, 1879)
- Buprestis apicipennis Reitter, 1898
- Buprestis apricans Herbst, 1801
- Buprestis atlas Szallies, 1994
- Buprestis auratostriata (Haupt, 1950)
- Buprestis aurora Bellamy, 2011
- Buprestis aurulenta Linnaeus, 1767
- Buprestis bergevini Théry, 1911
- Buprestis bertheloti Laporte & Gory, 1837
- Buprestis bilyi Novak & Kubá, 1993
- Buprestis biplagiata Waterhouse, 1882
- Buprestis carabuho Westcott, 1998
- Buprestis catoxantha Gory, 1840
- Buprestis concinna (Heer, 1879)
- Buprestis confluenta Say, 1823
- Buprestis connexa Horn, 1875
- Buprestis consularis Gory, 1841
- Buprestis costipennis (Fairmaire, 1891)
- Buprestis cubensis Fisher, 1925
- Buprestis cupressi Germar, 1817
- Buprestis cuprostriata (Weidlich, 1987)
- Buprestis dalmatina Mannerheim, 1837
- Buprestis decemspilota Hope, 1831
- Buprestis decipiens Fisher, 1925
- Buprestis decora Fabricius, 1775
- Buprestis deleta (Heer, 1847)
- Buprestis douei Lucas, 1846
- Buprestis dumonti (Théry, 1942)
- Buprestis esakii Kurosawa, 1954
- Buprestis fairmairei Théry, 1911
- Buprestis fasciata Fabricius, 1787
- Buprestis flavoangulata (Fairmaire, 1856)
- Buprestis florissantensis Wickham, 1914
- Buprestis fremontiae Burke, 1924
- Buprestis gibbsii (LeConte, 1857)
- Buprestis gracilis (Heer, 1847)
- Buprestis griseomicans (Haupt, 1950)
- Buprestis guttatipennis Abeille de Perrin, 1900
- Buprestis haardti Théry, 1934
- Buprestis haemorrhoidalis Herbst, 1780
- Buprestis hauboldi (Weidlich, 1987)
- Buprestis hauseri Obenberger, 1928
- Buprestis heydeni (Heer, 1847)
- Buprestis hilaris Klug, 1829
- Buprestis hispaniolae Fisher, 1940
- Buprestis humeralis Klug, 1829
- Buprestis intricata Casey, 1909
- Buprestis kashimirensis Beeson, 1919
- Buprestis kruegeri (Hoscheck, 1929)
- Buprestis kudiensis Cockerell, 1926
- Buprestis laeviventris (LeConte, 1857)
- Buprestis langii Mannerheim, 1843
- Buprestis lebisi Descarpentries, 1956
- Buprestis lineata Fabricius, 1781
- Buprestis lyrata Casey, 1909
- Buprestis maculativentris Say, 1825
- Buprestis maculipennis Gory, 1841
- Buprestis magica Laporte & Gory, 1837
- Buprestis margineaurata Weidlich, 1987
- Buprestis maura Olivier, 1790
- Buprestis megistrache Cockerell, 1926
- Buprestis metallescens Abeille de Perrin, 1891
- Buprestis meyeri Heyden, 1858
- Buprestis mirabilis Kurosawa, 1969
- Buprestis novemmaculata Linnaeus, 1767
- Buprestis nutalli Kirby, 1837
- Buprestis octoguttata Linnaeus, 1758
- Buprestis panamensis Théry, 1923
- Buprestis parmaculativentris Knull, 1958
- Buprestis picta Waterhouse, 1882
- Buprestis piliventris Waterhouse, 1882
- Buprestis pongraczi Weidlich, 1987
- Buprestis pristina (Heyden, 1862)
- Buprestis prospera Casey, 1909
- Buprestis redempta (Heyden, 1859)
- Buprestis rufipes Olivier, 1790
- Buprestis rustica Linnaeus, 1758
- Buprestis rusticana (Heer, 1847)
- Buprestis salisburyensis Herbst, 1801
- Buprestis salomonii (Thomson, 1878)
- Buprestis samanthae (Hattori & Tanaka, 2007)
- Buprestis sanguinea Fabricius, 1798
- Buprestis saxigena Scudder, 1879
- Buprestis scudderi Wickham, 1914
- Buprestis senecta Heyden, 1858
- Buprestis seorsus (Haupt, 1950)
- Buprestis sepulta Scudder, 1879
- Buprestis seyfriedi (Heer, 1847)
- Buprestis splendens Fabricius, 1775
- Buprestis sterbai Obenberger, 1943
- Buprestis striata Fabricius, 1775
- Buprestis strigosa Gebler, 1830
- Buprestis subornata (LeConte, 1860)
- Buprestis sulcicollis (LeConte, 1860)
- Buprestis tertiaria Scudder, 1879
- Buprestis tincta (Heer, 1862)
- Buprestis tradita Heyden, 1859
- Buprestis transversepicta Kerremans, 1897
- Buprestis ventralis Waterhouse, 1882
- Buprestis viridistriatus (Haupt, 1950)
- Buprestis viridisuturalis Nicolay & Weiss, 1918
- Buprestis zayasi Fisher, 1953
