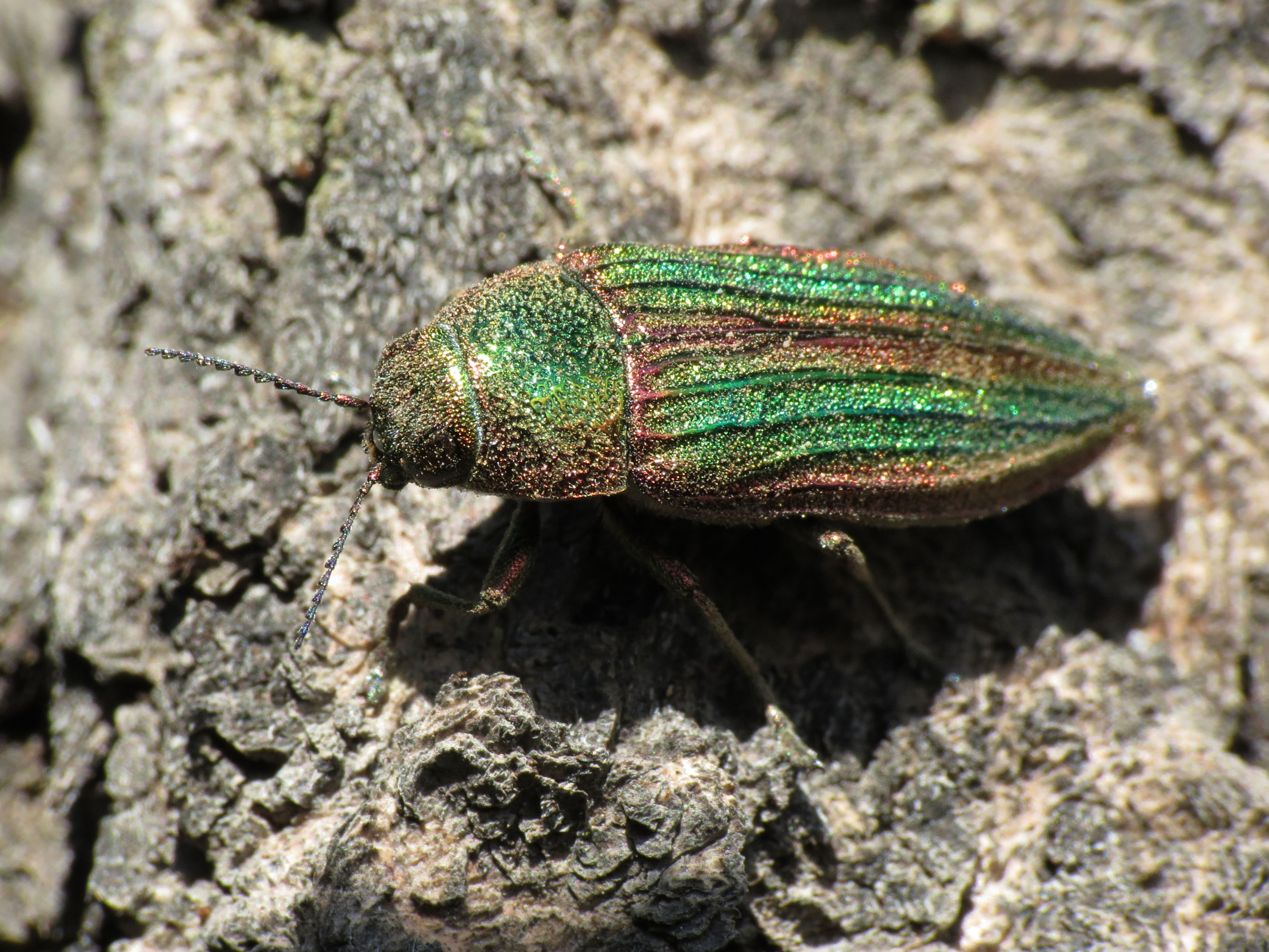
- Adult

Scientific classification
- Kingdom: Animalia
- Phylum: Arthropoda
- Class: Insecta
- Order: Coleoptera
- Suborder: Polyphaga
- Infraorder: Elateriformia
- Family: Buprestidae
- Genus: Buprestis
- Species: B. aurulenta

Binomial name
- Buprestis aurulenta Linnaeus, 1767

= Buprestis aurulenta =

Species of beetle

Buprestis aurulenta, commonly known as the golden jewel beetle or golden buprestid, is a species of beetle in the genus Buprestis.

The larvae of Buprestis aurulenta live inside a variety of coniferous trees and can survive for long periods in dry wood. The adult beetle is an iridescent green, with shining orange trim all around the wing covers.

The beetles are found in the Pacific Northwest as far north as southern British Columbia and southward through the Rocky Mountains to Mexico. They are rare in Alberta, and specimens have been collected in Manitoba.

On May 27, 1983, a golden jewel beetle emerged from a staircase in Essex, UK, after at least 47 years as a larva.
