= Agrilaxia hespenheidei =

Scientific classification
- Domain: Eukaryota
- Kingdom: Animalia
- Phylum: Arthropoda
- Class: Insecta
- Order: Coleoptera
- Suborder: Polyphaga
- Infraorder: Elateriformia
- Family: Buprestidae
- Genus: Agrilaxia
- Species: A. hespenheidei

Binomial name
- Agrilaxia hespenheidei (Bílý, 1984)

Species of beetle

Agrilaxia hespenheidei is a species of metallic wood-boring beetle in the family Buprestidae. It is found in Central America and North America.
