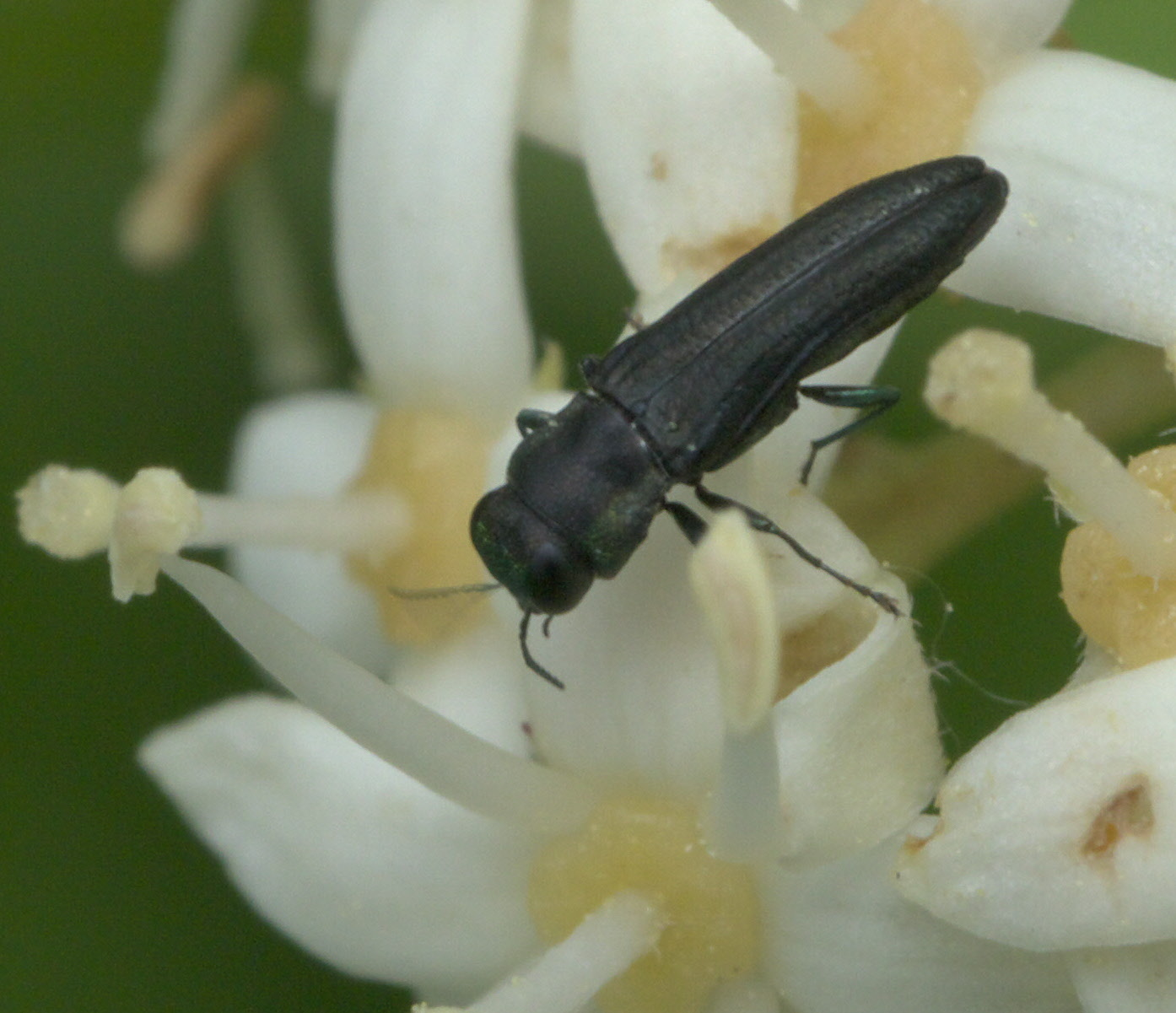
- Agrilaxia flavimana

Scientific classification
- Kingdom: Animalia
- Phylum: Arthropoda
- Class: Insecta
- Order: Coleoptera
- Suborder: Polyphaga
- Infraorder: Elateriformia
- Family: Buprestidae
- Subfamily: Buprestinae
- Genus: Agrilaxia; Kerremans, 1903

= Agrilaxia =

Genus of beetles

Agrilaxia is a genus of beetles in the family Buprestidae, containing the following species:

- Agrilaxia acuminata (Cobos, 1972)
- Agrilaxia aeruginosa (Kerremans, 1897)
- Agrilaxia alterna (Kerremans, 1900)
- Agrilaxia alticola Bílý & Westcott, 2005
- Agrilaxia alvarengai (Cobos, 1975)
- Agrilaxia ambigua (Cobos, 1972)
- Agrilaxia analis (Bílý, 1985)
- Agrilaxia angustifrons (Cobos, 1972)
- Agrilaxia bahiana (Cobos, 1972)
- Agrilaxia balloui (Fisher, 1942)
- Agrilaxia bilyana (Cobos, 1986)
- Agrilaxia bivittata (Gory, 1841)
- Agrilaxia boliviana (Cobos, 1972)
- Agrilaxia bongrandi (Cobos, 1972)
- Agrilaxia brasiliensis (Kerremans, 1900)
- Agrilaxia brunneipennis (Kerremans, 1900)
- Agrilaxia buckiana (Cobos, 1972)
- Agrilaxia catharinae (Cobos, 1972)
- Agrilaxia chlorana Obenberger, 1928
- Agrilaxia chrysifrons (Kerremans, 1896)
- Agrilaxia clara (Kerremans, 1899)
- Agrilaxia claudei (Cobos, 1972)
- Agrilaxia cordigera Obenberger, 1924
- Agrilaxia coriacea (Kerremans, 1887)
- Agrilaxia costaricensis Obenberger, 1922
- Agrilaxia costulifera (Cobos, 1972)
- Agrilaxia costulipennis (Cobos, 1972)
- Agrilaxia cyaneoviridis (Kerremans, 1900)
- Agrilaxia decipiens (Burmeister, 1872)
- Agrilaxia decolorata (Kerremans, 1899)
- Agrilaxia descarpentriesana (Cobos, 1972)
- Agrilaxia dohrni Obenberger, 1924
- Agrilaxia elongata (Kerremans, 1899)
- Agrilaxia fasciata (Waterhouse, 1889)
- Agrilaxia flavimana (Gory, 1841)
- Agrilaxia freyella Bílý, 1995
- Agrilaxia funebris (Kerremans, 1900)
- Agrilaxia gounellei Kerremans, 1903
- Agrilaxia hayeki (Cobos, 1972)
- Agrilaxia hespenheidei (Bílý, 1984)
- Agrilaxia hoschecki (Cobos, 1972)
- Agrilaxia hypocrita (Cobos, 1975)
- Agrilaxia ignifrons (Cobos, 1972)
- Agrilaxia insidiosa (Cobos, 1975)
- Agrilaxia interposita (Cobos, 1972)
- Agrilaxia jaliscoana (Bílý, 1993)
- Agrilaxia kerremansi Théry, 1911
- Agrilaxia krombeini (Cobos, 1972)
- Agrilaxia lata Kerremans, 1903
- Agrilaxia martinezi (Cobos, 1972)
- Agrilaxia meridionalis (Kerremans, 1897)
- Agrilaxia michoacana (Bílý, 1993)
- Agrilaxia minuta (Kerremans, 1900)
- Agrilaxia modesta (Kerremans, 1897)
- Agrilaxia monrosi (Cobos, 1972)
- Agrilaxia nana (Dugès, 1891)
- Agrilaxia nobilis Obenberger, 1922
- Agrilaxia occidentalis (Kerremans, 1900)
- Agrilaxia ocularis (Kerremans, 1900)
- Agrilaxia oculata (Cobos, 1972)
- Agrilaxia oculatissima (Cobos, 1972)
- Agrilaxia opima (Kerremans, 1897)
- Agrilaxia panamensis (Cobos, 1972)
- Agrilaxia paradisea (Cobos, 1972)
- Agrilaxia peruviana (Cobos, 1972)
- Agrilaxia plagiata (Kerremans, 1897)
- Agrilaxia pujoli (Cobos, 1975)
- Agrilaxia quadrivittata (Cobos, 1972)
- Agrilaxia rugosa Kerremans, 1903
- Agrilaxia schmidti Obenberger, 1924
- Agrilaxia semirugosa (Cobos, 1975)
- Agrilaxia semistriata Théry, 1911
- Agrilaxia simillima (Cobos, 1972)
- Agrilaxia smaragdina (Cobos, 1972)
- Agrilaxia solarii Théry, 1911
- Agrilaxia splendidicollis (Kerremans, 1900)
- Agrilaxia subcostata (Cobos, 1972)
- Agrilaxia subviridis (Kerremans, 1900)
- Agrilaxia suturalis Kerremans, 1903
- Agrilaxia tenebrosa (Cobos, 1972)
- Agrilaxia thoracica (Kerremans, 1899)
- Agrilaxia tremolerasi Obenberger, 1928
- Agrilaxia tristis (Cobos, 1972)
- Agrilaxia varians (Gory, 1841)
- Agrilaxia violaceipennis (Thomson, 1879)
- Agrilaxia viridisuturalis (Cobos, 1972)
- Agrilaxia vitticollis (Gory, 1841)
