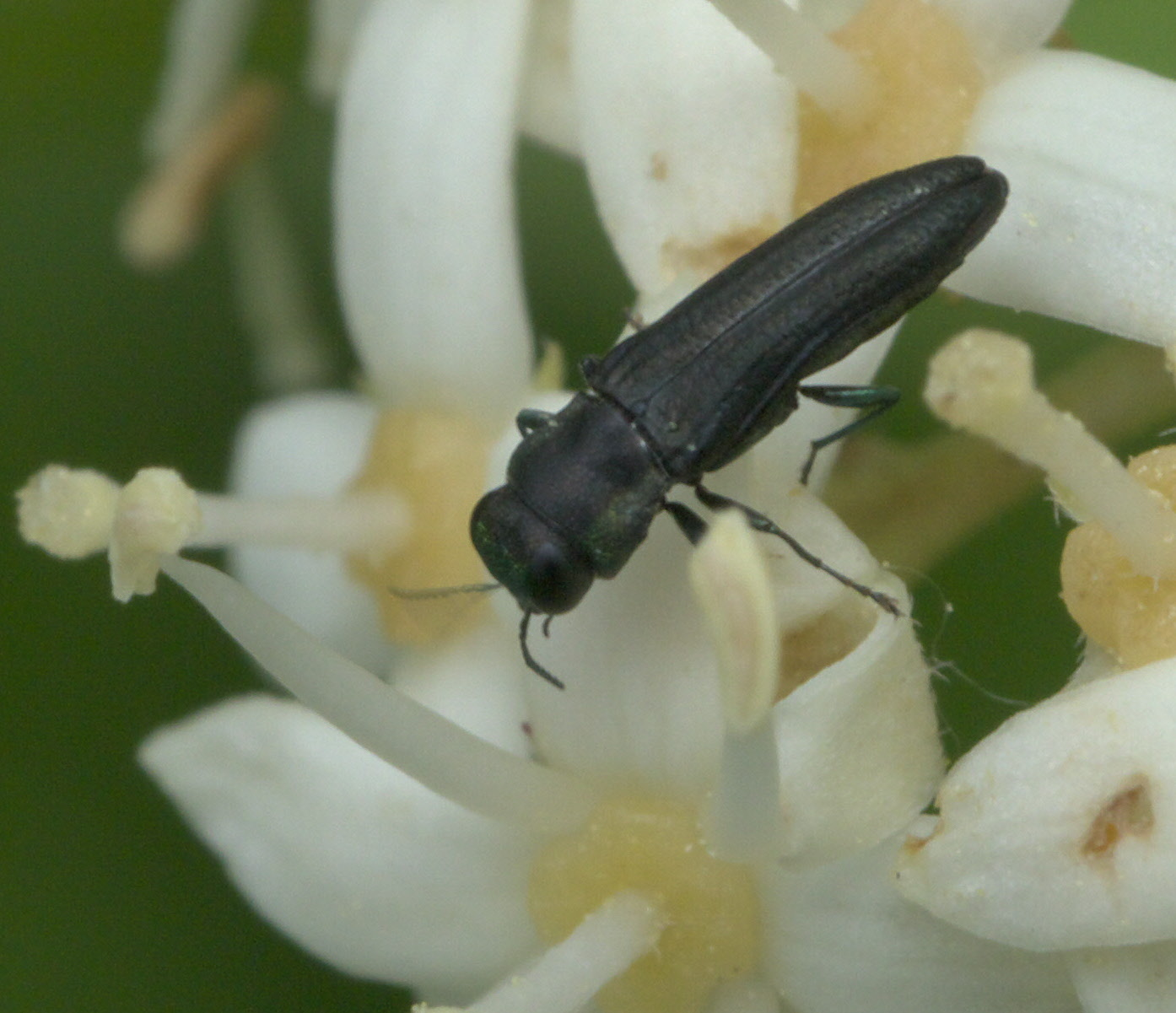

Scientific classification
- Domain: Eukaryota
- Kingdom: Animalia
- Phylum: Arthropoda
- Class: Insecta
- Order: Coleoptera
- Suborder: Polyphaga
- Infraorder: Elateriformia
- Family: Buprestidae
- Genus: Agrilaxia
- Species: A. flavimana

Binomial name
- Agrilaxia flavimana (Gory, 1841)

Synonyms
- Agrilaxia arizonae Chamberlin, 1926; Agrilaxia borealis Obenberger, 1922; Agrilaxia gracilis Obenberger, 1924

= Agrilaxia flavimana =

Species of beetle

Agrilaxia flavimana is a species of metallic wood-boring beetle in the family Buprestidae. It is found in Central America and North America.
