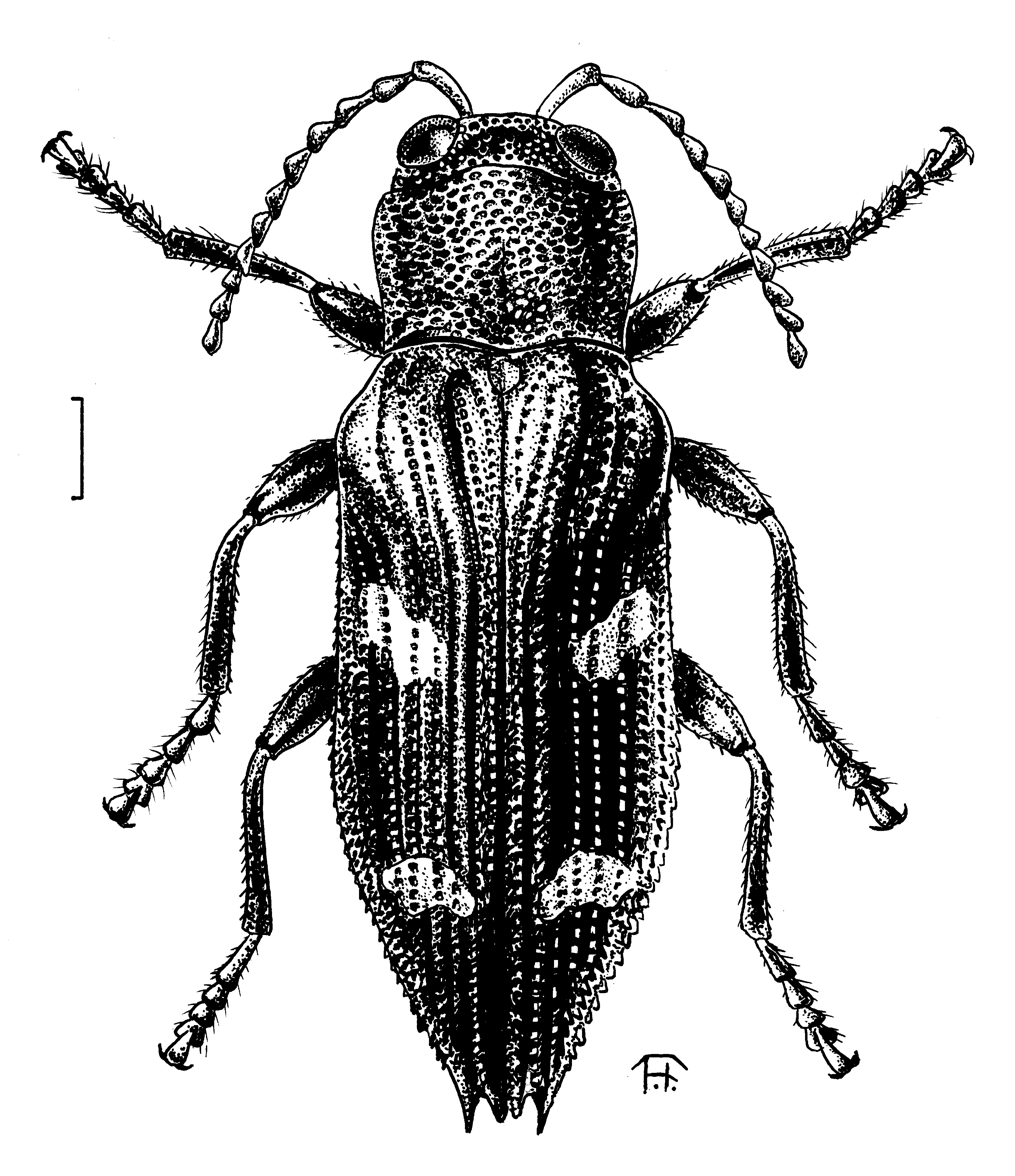
- Buprestidae Nascioides

Scientific classification
- Kingdom: Animalia
- Phylum: Arthropoda
- Class: Insecta
- Order: Coleoptera
- Suborder: Polyphaga
- Infraorder: Elateriformia
- Family: Buprestidae
- Genus: Nascioides; Kerremans, 1903

= Nascioides =

Genus of beetles

Nascioides is a genus of beetles in the family Buprestidae, containing the following species:

- Nascioides bicolor Williams, 1987
- Nascioides caledonica Williams & Bellamy, 2002
- Nascioides carissima (Waterhouse, 1882)
- Nascioides costata (Carter, 1912)
- Nascioides elderi Williams, 1987
- Nascioides elessarella Williams, 1987
- Nascioides enysi (Sharp, 1877)
- Nascioides falsomultesima Williams, 1987
- Nascioides macalpinei Williams, 1987
- Nascioides multesima (Olliff, 1886)
- Nascioides munda (Olliff, 1886)
- Nascioides nulgarra Williams, 1987
- Nascioides olliffi Williams & Watkins, 1985
- Nascioides parryi (Hope, 1843)
- Nascioides pulcher (van de Poll, 1886)
- Nascioides quadrinotata (van de Poll, 1886)
- Nascioides storeyi Williams, 1987
- Nascioides subcostata Williams & Bellamy, 2002
- Nascioides tillyardi (Carter, 1912)
- Nascioides viridis (Macleay, 1872)
- Nascioides walfordorum Williams & Bellamy, 2002
