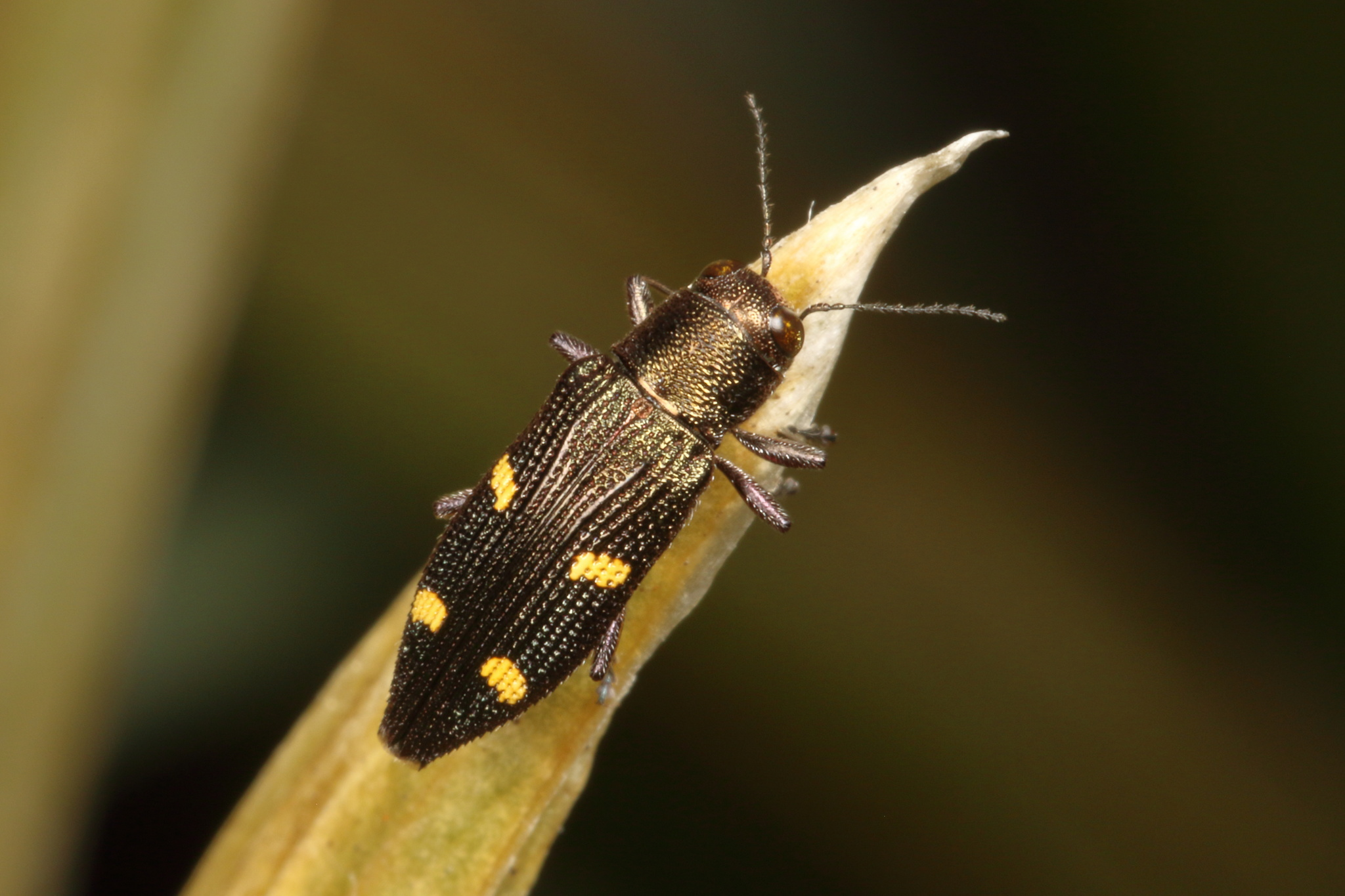

Scientific classification
- Kingdom: Animalia
- Phylum: Arthropoda
- Class: Insecta
- Order: Coleoptera
- Suborder: Polyphaga
- Infraorder: Elateriformia
- Family: Buprestidae
- Genus: Nascioides
- Species: N. enysi

Binomial name
- Nascioides enysi (Sharp, 1877)

= Nascioides enysi =

Species of beetle

Nascioides enysi is a species of beetle. It is native to New Zealand.

== Description ==
It is a small black beetle with four orange spots on the elytrum.

== Range ==
This species is found in New Zealand, on both the North and South Islands.

== Habitat ==
Near Nothofagus beeches, upon which it feeds.
