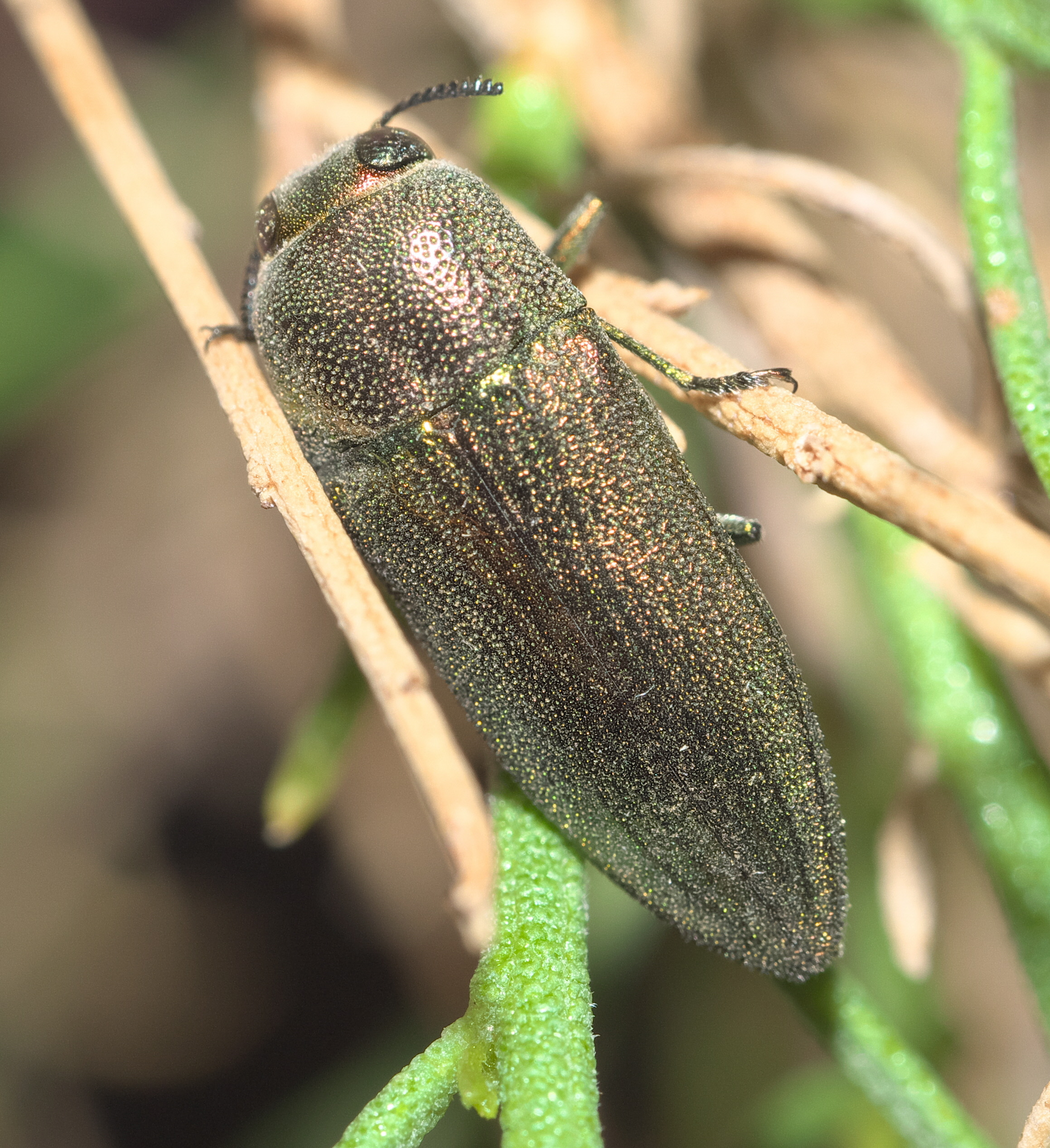

Scientific classification
- Domain: Eukaryota
- Kingdom: Animalia
- Phylum: Arthropoda
- Class: Insecta
- Order: Coleoptera
- Suborder: Polyphaga
- Infraorder: Elateriformia
- Family: Buprestidae
- Genus: Agaeocera
- Species: A. gentilis

Binomial name
- Agaeocera gentilis (Horn, 1885)

= Agaeocera gentilis =

Species of beetle

Agaeocera gentilis is a species of metallic wood-boring beetle in the family Buprestidae. It is found in Central America and North America.

== Subspecies ==
These two subspecies belong to the species Agaeocera gentilis:

- Agaeocera gentilis gentilis (Horn, 1885)
- Agaeocera gentilis peninsularis Van Dyke, 1945
