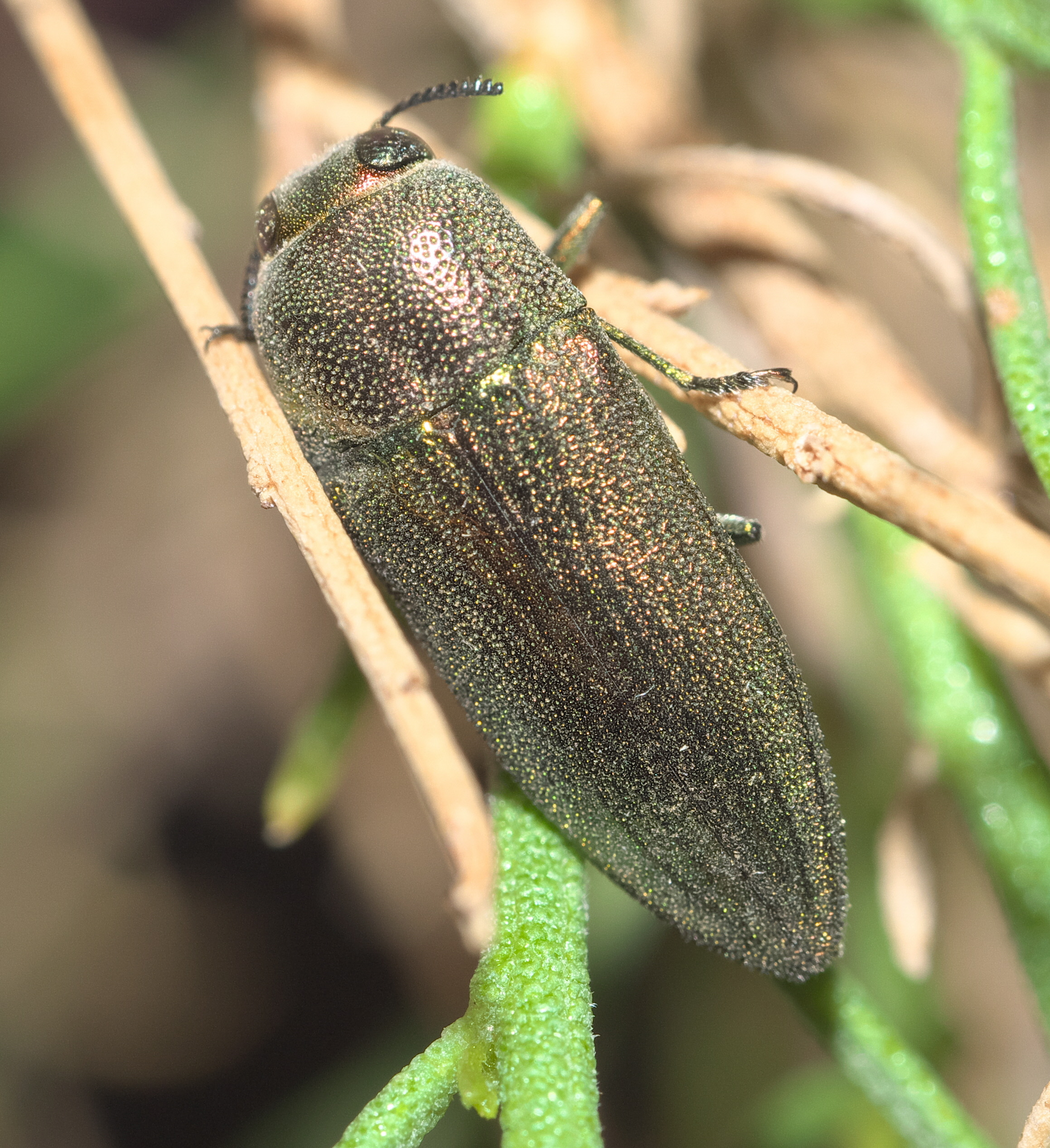
- Agaeocera gentilis

Scientific classification
- Kingdom: Animalia
- Phylum: Arthropoda
- Class: Insecta
- Order: Coleoptera
- Suborder: Polyphaga
- Infraorder: Elateriformia
- Family: Buprestidae
- Tribe: Buprestini
- Genus: Agaeocera; Saunders, 1871

= Agaeocera =

Genus of beetles

Agaeocera is a genus of beetles in the family Buprestidae, containing the following species:

- Agaeocera gentilis (Horn, 1885)
- Agaeocera gigas (Gory & Laporte, 1839)
- Agaeocera scintillans Waterhouse, 1882
