= Spectralia roburella =

Scientific classification
- Domain: Eukaryota
- Kingdom: Animalia
- Phylum: Arthropoda
- Class: Insecta
- Order: Coleoptera
- Suborder: Polyphaga
- Infraorder: Elateriformia
- Family: Buprestidae
- Genus: Spectralia
- Species: S. roburella

Binomial name
- Spectralia roburella (Knull, 1941)

Species of beetle

Spectralia roburella is a species of metallic wood-boring beetle in the family Buprestidae. It is found in North America.
