= Spectralia gracilipes =

Scientific classification
- Domain: Eukaryota
- Kingdom: Animalia
- Phylum: Arthropoda
- Class: Insecta
- Order: Coleoptera
- Suborder: Polyphaga
- Infraorder: Elateriformia
- Family: Buprestidae
- Genus: Spectralia
- Species: S. gracilipes

Binomial name
- Spectralia gracilipes (Melsheimer, 1845)

Synonyms
- Spectralia abbreviata (Casey, 1914); Spectralia macilenta (Casey, 1909); Spectralia ocularis (Casey, 1914)

Species of beetle

Spectralia gracilipes is a species of metallic wood-boring beetle in the family Buprestidae. It is found in North America.
