= Spectralia robusta =

Scientific classification
- Domain: Eukaryota
- Kingdom: Animalia
- Phylum: Arthropoda
- Class: Insecta
- Order: Coleoptera
- Suborder: Polyphaga
- Infraorder: Elateriformia
- Family: Buprestidae
- Genus: Spectralia
- Species: S. robusta

Binomial name
- Spectralia robusta (Chamberlin, 1920)

Synonyms
- Spectralia riograndei (Knull, 1937)

Species of beetle

Spectralia robusta is a species of metallic wood-boring beetle in the family Buprestidae. It is found in North America.
