= Spectralia =

Scientific classification
- Kingdom: Animalia
- Phylum: Arthropoda
- Class: Insecta
- Order: Coleoptera
- Suborder: Polyphaga
- Infraorder: Elateriformia
- Family: Buprestidae
- Subfamily: Buprestinae
- Genus: Spectralia; Casey, 1909

Genus of beetles

Spectralia is a genus of beetles in the family Buprestidae, containing the following species:

- Spectralia aequalis (Waterhouse, 1889)
- Spectralia albonotata (Laporte & Gory, 1837)
- Spectralia arcuata (Laporte & Gory, 1837)
- Spectralia bahamica (Cazier, 1952)
- Spectralia carinata (Silbermann, 1838)
- Spectralia costulata (Laporte & Gory, 1837)
- Spectralia costulifera (Chevrolat, 1867)
- Spectralia cuprescens (Knull, 1940)
- Spectralia frontalis (Waterhouse, 1882)
- Spectralia gracilipes (Melsheimer, 1845)
- Spectralia maculatissima (Thomson, 1879)
- Spectralia multipunctata (Olivier, 1790)
- Spectralia nelsoni Westcott, 2006
- Spectralia parafrontalis (Nelson, 1971)
- Spectralia prosternalis (Schaeffer, 1904)
- Spectralia purpurascens (Schaeffer, 1905)
- Spectralia roburella (Knull, 1941)
- Spectralia robusta (Chamberlin, 1920)
- Spectralia sulcicollis (Chevrolat, 1867)
- Spectralia sulcifera (Laporte & Gory, 1837)
- Spectralia uniformis (Waterhouse, 1889)
- Spectralia viridipunctata (Thomson, 1879)
