= Spectralia cuprescens =

Scientific classification
- Domain: Eukaryota
- Kingdom: Animalia
- Phylum: Arthropoda
- Class: Insecta
- Order: Coleoptera
- Suborder: Polyphaga
- Infraorder: Elateriformia
- Family: Buprestidae
- Genus: Spectralia
- Species: S. cuprescens

Binomial name
- Spectralia cuprescens (Knull, 1940)

Species of beetle

Spectralia cuprescens is a species of metallic wood-boring beetle in the family Buprestidae. It is found in North America.
