= Spectralia prosternalis =

Scientific classification
- Kingdom: Animalia
- Phylum: Arthropoda
- Clade: Pancrustacea
- Class: Insecta
- Order: Coleoptera
- Suborder: Polyphaga
- Infraorder: Elateriformia
- Family: Buprestidae
- Genus: Spectralia
- Species: S. prosternalis

Binomial name
- Spectralia prosternalis (Schaeffer, 1904)

Species of beetle

Spectralia prosternalis is a species of metallic wood-boring beetle in the family Buprestidae. It is found in North America.
