= Sendaphne =

Scientific classification
- Kingdom: Animalia
- Phylum: Arthropoda
- Class: Insecta
- Order: Hymenoptera
- Family: Braconidae
- Subfamily: Microgastrinae
- Genus: Sendaphne; Nixon, 1965

Genus of wasps

Sendaphne is a genus of wasp in the family Braconidae. There are about 11 described species in Sendaphne, found in the Neotropics.

== Species ==
These 11 species belong to the genus Sendaphne:

- Sendaphne anitae Fernandez-Triana & Whitfield, 2014
- Sendaphne bennetti Fernandez-Triana & Whitfield, 2014
- Sendaphne brasilianus Penteado-Dias, 1995
- Sendaphne broadi Fernandez-Triana & Whitfield, 2014
- Sendaphne dianariaspennae Fernandez-Triana & Whitfield, 2014
- Sendaphne jatai Penteado-Dias, 1995
- Sendaphne olearus Nixon, 1965
- Sendaphne paranaensis Scatolini & Penteado-Dias, 1999
- Sendaphne penteadodiasae Fernandez-Triana & Whitfield, 2014
- Sendaphne rogerblancoi Fernandez-Triana & Whitfield, 2014
- Sendaphne sulmo Nixon, 1965
