= Alloplitis =

Scientific classification
- Kingdom: Animalia
- Phylum: Arthropoda
- Class: Insecta
- Order: Hymenoptera
- Family: Braconidae
- Subfamily: Microgastrinae
- Genus: Alloplitis; Nixon, 1965

Genus of wasps

Alloplitis is a genus of wasp in the family Braconidae. There are about eight described species in Alloplitis. Alloplitis congensis is found in west Africa, and the other species in Indomalaya.

== Species ==
These eight species belong to the genus Alloplitis:

- Alloplitis albiventris Long & van Achterberg, 2008
- Alloplitis completus Mason, 1981
- Alloplitis congensis (de Saeger, 1944)
- Alloplitis detractus (Walker, 1860)
- Alloplitis guapo Nixon, 1965
- Alloplitis laevigaster Long & van Achterberg, 2008
- Alloplitis typhon Nixon, 1965
- Alloplitis vietnamicus Long & van Achterberg, 2008
