= Semionis =

Scientific classification
- Kingdom: Animalia
- Phylum: Arthropoda
- Class: Insecta
- Order: Hymenoptera
- Family: Braconidae
- Subfamily: Microgastrinae
- Genus: Semionis; Nixon, 1965

Genus of wasps

Semionis is a genus of wasp in the family Braconidae. There are three described species in Semionis, two of them extinct.

== Species ==
These three species belong to the genus Semionis:

- Semionis rarus Nixon, 1965 (South Africa)
- † Semionis nixoni Tobias, 1987 (Baltic amber)
- † Semionis wightensis Belokobylskij, 2014 (Bembridge Marls)
