= Miropotes =

Scientific classification
- Kingdom: Animalia
- Phylum: Arthropoda
- Class: Insecta
- Order: Hymenoptera
- Family: Braconidae
- Subfamily: Microgastrinae
- Genus: Miropotes; Nixon, 1965

Genus of wasps

Miropotes is a genus of wasp in the family Braconidae. There are about 15 described species in Miropotes, found in Australasia and southeast Asia.

== Species ==
These 15 species belong to the genus Miropotes:

- Miropotes austini Fernández-Triana & Whitfield, 2014
- Miropotes boothis Austin, 1990
- Miropotes burringbaris Austin, 1990
- Miropotes cadgeis Austin, 1990
- Miropotes chookolis Austin, 1990
- Miropotes creon Nixon, 1965
- Miropotes goobitis Austin, 1990
- Miropotes inexpectatus van Achterberg & Fernandez-Triana, 2017
- Miropotes katois Austin, 1990
- Miropotes kilkulunis Austin, 1990
- Miropotes lordhowensis Fernández-Triana & Whitfield, 2014
- Miropotes neglectus Fernández-Triana & Whitfield, 2014
- Miropotes orientalis Fernández-Triana & van Achterberg, 2014
- Miropotes petiolaris (Szépligeti, 1905)
- Miropotes thuraris Austin, 1990
