= Sathon (disambiguation) =

Sathon district is one of 50 districts in Bangkok, Thailand.

Sathon may also refer to:

- Sathon Road, major road in Bangkok
- Sathorn Pier, pier along the Chao Phraya River near Taksin Bridge in Bangkok
- Sathon (wasp), genus of wasps
