= Jimwhitfieldius =

Scientific classification
- Kingdom: Animalia
- Phylum: Arthropoda
- Class: Insecta
- Order: Hymenoptera
- Family: Braconidae
- Subfamily: Microgastrinae
- Genus: Jimwhitfieldius; Fernandez-Triana, 2018

Genus of wasps

Jimwhitfieldius is a genus of wasp in the family Braconidae. There are at least two described species in Jimwhitfieldius.

== Species ==
These two species belong to the genus Jimwhitfieldius:

- Jimwhitfieldius jamesi Fernandez-Triana & Boudreault, 2018 (Thailand, Vietnam)
- Jimwhitfieldius sydneyae Fernandez-Triana & Boudreault, 2018 (Thailand)
