= Keylimepie =

Scientific classification
- Kingdom: Animalia
- Phylum: Arthropoda
- Class: Insecta
- Order: Hymenoptera
- Family: Braconidae
- Subfamily: Microgastrinae
- Genus: Keylimepie; Fernández-Triana, 2016

Genus of wasps

Keylimepie is a genus of wasp in the family Braconidae. There are at least four described species in Keylimepie.

== Species ==
These four species belong to the genus Keylimepie:

- Keylimepie hadhramautensis van Achterberg & Fernández-Triana, 2017 (Yemen)
- Keylimepie peckorum Fernández-Triana, 2016 (Florida)
- Keylimepie sanaaensis van Achterberg & Fernández-Triana, 2017 (Yemen)
- Keylimepie striatus (Muesebeck, 1922) (North America)
