= Kotenkosius =

Scientific classification
- Kingdom: Animalia
- Phylum: Arthropoda
- Class: Insecta
- Order: Hymenoptera
- Family: Braconidae
- Subfamily: Microgastrinae
- Genus: Kotenkosius
- Species: K. tricarinatus

Binomial name
- Kotenkosius tricarinatus Fernandez-Triana & Boudreault, 2018

Genus of wasps

Kotenkosius is a genus of wasp in the family Braconidae. There is at least one described species in Kotenkosius, K. tricarinatus, found in Indomalaya.
