= Clarkinella =

Scientific classification
- Kingdom: Animalia
- Phylum: Arthropoda
- Class: Insecta
- Order: Hymenoptera
- Family: Braconidae
- Subfamily: Microgastrinae
- Genus: Clarkinella; Mason, 1981

Genus of wasps

Clarkinella is a genus of wasp in the family Braconidae. There are at least two described species in Clarkinella.

== Species ==
These two species belong to the genus Clarkinella:

- Clarkinella canadensis Mason, 1981 (Canada)
- Clarkinella edithae Mason, 1981 (Brazil, Trinidad & Tobago)
