= Papanteles =

Scientific classification
- Kingdom: Animalia
- Phylum: Arthropoda
- Class: Insecta
- Order: Hymenoptera
- Family: Braconidae
- Subfamily: Microgastrinae
- Genus: Papanteles; Mason, 1981

Genus of wasps

Papanteles is a genus of wasp in the family Braconidae. There are at least two described species in Papanteles, found in the Neotropics.

== Species ==
These two species belong to the genus Papanteles:

- Papanteles peckorum Mason, 1981
- Papanteles virbius (Nixon, 1965)
