= Austinicotesia =

Scientific classification
- Kingdom: Animalia
- Phylum: Arthropoda
- Class: Insecta
- Order: Hymenoptera
- Family: Braconidae
- Subfamily: Microgastrinae
- Genus: Austinicotesia; Fernandez-Triana, 2018

Genus of wasps

Austinicotesia is a genus of wasp in the family Braconidae. There are at least two described species in Austinicotesia.

== Species ==
These two species belong to the genus Austinicotesia:

- Austinicotesia indonesiensis Fernandez-Triana & Boudreault, 2018 (Indonesia)
- Austinicotesia papuanus Fernandez-Triana & Boudreault, 2018 (Papua New Guinea)
