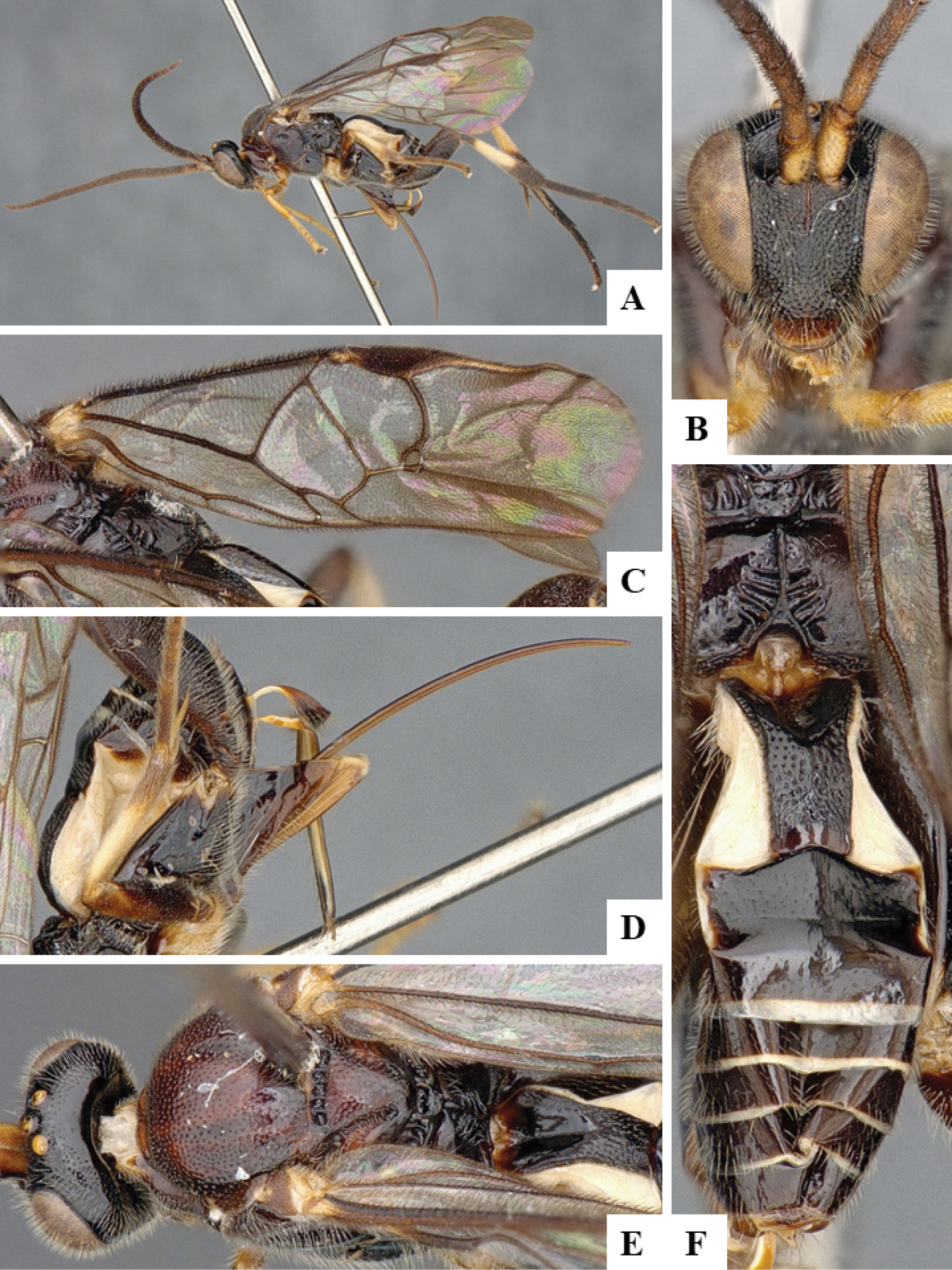

Scientific classification
- Kingdom: Animalia
- Phylum: Arthropoda
- Class: Insecta
- Order: Hymenoptera
- Family: Braconidae
- Subfamily: Microgastrinae
- Genus: Agupta; Fernandez-Triana, 2018

= Agupta =

Genus of wasps

Agupta is a genus of wasp in the family Braconidae. There are at least four described species in Agupta, found in Malaysia.

== Species ==
These four species belong to the genus Agupta:

- Agupta danyi Fernandez-Triana & Boudreault, 2018
- Agupta jeanphilippei Fernandez-Triana & Boudreault, 2018
- Agupta raymondi Fernandez-Triana & Boudreault, 2018
- Agupta solangeae Fernandez-Triana & Boudreault, 2018
