= Pseudofornicia =

Scientific classification
- Kingdom: Animalia
- Phylum: Arthropoda
- Class: Insecta
- Order: Hymenoptera
- Family: Braconidae
- Subfamily: Microgastrinae
- Genus: Pseudofornicia van Achterberg, 2015

Genus of wasps

Pseudofornicia is a genus of wasp in the family Braconidae. There are at least four described species in Pseudofornicia, found in Australasia.

== Species ==
These four species belong to the genus Pseudofornicia:

- Pseudofornicia commoni (Austin & Dangerfield, 1992) (Australia)
- Pseudofornicia flavoabdominis (He & Chen, 1994) (China)
- Pseudofornicia nigrisoma van Achterberg & Long, 2015 (Vietnam)
- Pseudofornicia vanachterbergi Long, 2015 (Vietnam)
