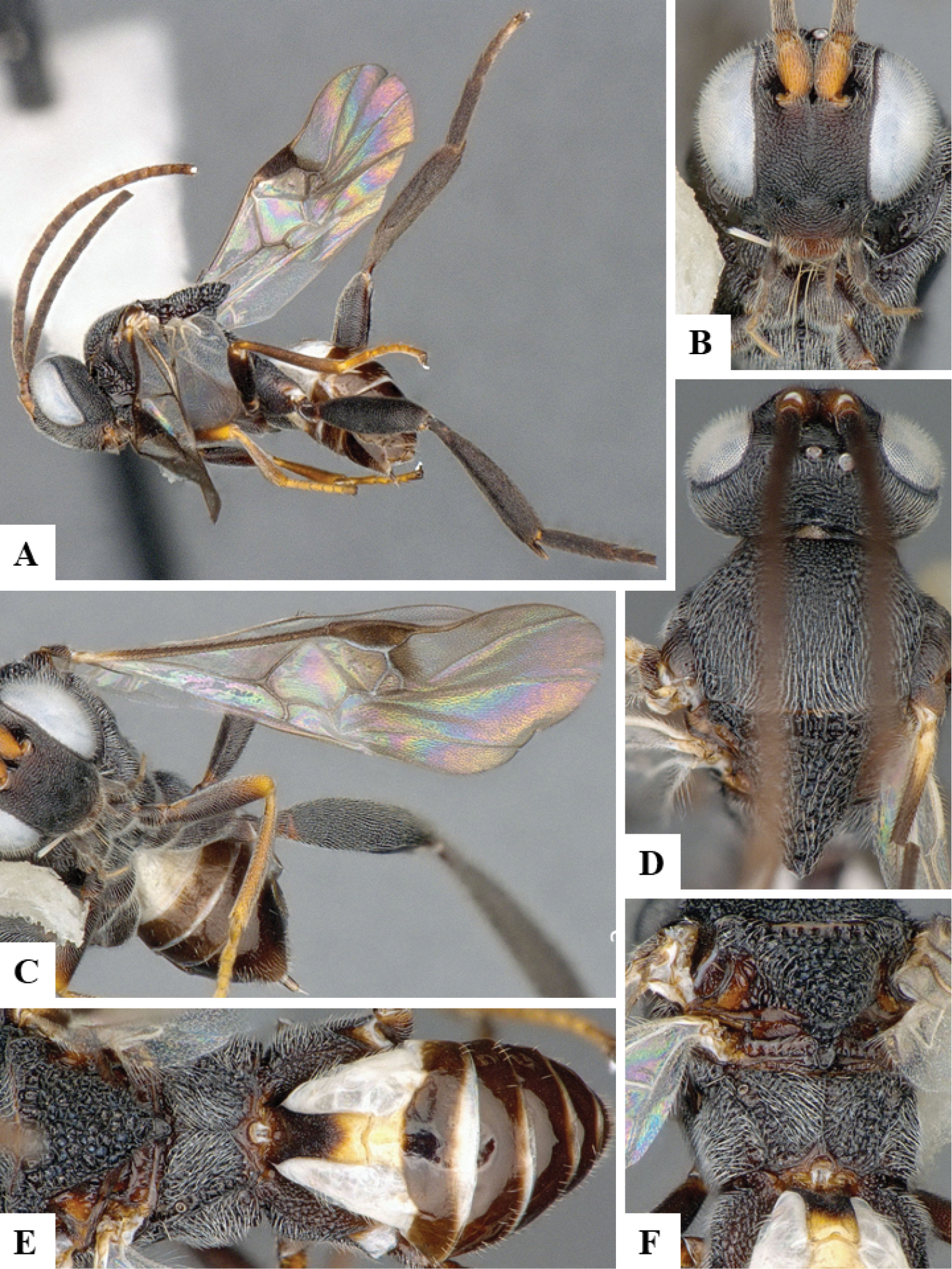
- Philoplitis punctatus

Scientific classification
- Kingdom: Animalia
- Phylum: Arthropoda
- Class: Insecta
- Order: Hymenoptera
- Family: Braconidae
- Subfamily: Microgastrinae
- Genus: Philoplitis; Nixon, 1965

= Philoplitis =

Genus of wasps

Philoplitis is a genus of wasp in the family Braconidae. There are about nine described species in Philoplitis, found in Africa and Indomalaya.

== Species ==
These nine species belong to the genus Philoplitis:

- Philoplitis adustipalpus Ahmad, 2005
- Philoplitis coniferens Nixon, 1965
- Philoplitis dzangasangha Fernandez-Triana & Ranjith, 2019
- Philoplitis keralensis Ranjith & Fernandez-Triana, 2019
- Philoplitis margalla Fernandez-Triana & Ranjith, 2019
- Philoplitis masneri Fernández-Triana & Goulet, 2009
- Philoplitis punctatus Fernández-Triana & Goulet, 2009
- Philoplitis striatus Fernández-Triana & Goulet, 2009
- Philoplitis trifoveatus Ranjith & Fernandez-Triana, 2019
