= Pelicope =

Scientific classification
- Kingdom: Animalia
- Phylum: Arthropoda
- Class: Insecta
- Order: Hymenoptera
- Family: Braconidae
- Subfamily: Microgastrinae
- Genus: Pelicope; Mason, 1981
- Species: P. yuccamica

Binomial name
- Pelicope yuccamica Mason, 1981

Genus of wasps

Pelicope is a genus of wasp in the family Braconidae. There is at least one described species in Pelicope, P. yuccamica, found in California.
