= Parapanteles =

Scientific classification
- Kingdom: Animalia
- Phylum: Arthropoda
- Class: Insecta
- Order: Hymenoptera
- Family: Braconidae
- Subfamily: Microgastrinae
- Genus: Parapanteles; Ashmead, 1900

Genus of wasps

Parapanteles is a genus of wasp in the family Braconidae. There are more than 60 described species in Parapanteles, found throughout most of the world.

== Species ==
These 62 species belong to the genus Parapanteles:

- Parapanteles aethiopicus (Wilkinson, 1931)
- Parapanteles aletiae (Riley, 1881)
- Parapanteles alternatus (Papp, 1973)
- Parapanteles arka Gupta, 2014
- Parapanteles aso (Nixon, 1967)
- Parapanteles atellae (Wilkinson, 1932)
- Parapanteles athamasae Gupta, Khot & Chorge, 2014
- Parapanteles bagicha (Narayanan & Subba Rao, 1961)
- Parapanteles cleo (Nixon, 1967)
- Parapanteles complexus Valerio & Janzen, 2009
- Parapanteles continuus Valerio & Whitfield, 2009
- Parapanteles covino Rousse, 2013
- Parapanteles cyclorhaphus (de Saeger, 1944)
- Parapanteles darignac Rousse, 2013
- Parapanteles demades (Nixon, 1965)
- Parapanteles echeriae Gupta, Pereira & Churi, 2013
- Parapanteles em Valerio & Whitfield, 2009
- Parapanteles endymion (Wilkinson, 1932)
- Parapanteles epiplemicidus (de Saeger, 1941)
- Parapanteles eros Gupta, 2014
- Parapanteles esha Gupta, 2014
- Parapanteles expulsus (Turner, 1919)
- Parapanteles fallax (de Saeger, 1944)
- Parapanteles folia (Nixon, 1965)
- Parapanteles furax (de Saeger, 1944)
- Parapanteles gerontogeae Donaldson, 1991
- Parapanteles hemitheae (Wilkinson, 1928)
- Parapanteles hyposidrae (Wilkinson, 1928)
- Parapanteles indicus (Bhatnagar, 1950)
- Parapanteles javensis (Rohwer, 1919)
- Parapanteles jhaverii (Bhatnagar, 1950)
- Parapanteles lincolnii Valerio & Whitfield, 2009
- Parapanteles maculipalpis (de Saeger, 1941)
- Parapanteles mariae Valerio & Whitfield, 2009
- Parapanteles masoni Austin & Dangerfield, 1992
- Parapanteles maynei (de Saeger, 1941)
- Parapanteles neocajani (Yousuf & Ray, 2010)
- Parapanteles neohyblaeae (Ray & Yousuf, 2009)
- Parapanteles nephos Valerio & Whitfield, 2009
- Parapanteles noae Valerio & Whitfield, 2009
- Parapanteles nydia (Nixon, 1967)
- Parapanteles paradoxus (Muesebeck, 1958)
- Parapanteles polus Valerio & Whitfield, 2009
- Parapanteles prosper (Wilkinson, 1932)
- Parapanteles prosymna (Nixon, 1965)
- Parapanteles punctatissimus (Granger, 1949)
- Parapanteles rarus Valerio & Whitfield, 2009
- Parapanteles regale Gupta, 2014
- Parapanteles regalis (de Saeger, 1941)
- Parapanteles rooibos Valerio, Whitfield & Kole, 2005
- Parapanteles sarpedon (de Saeger, 1944)
- Parapanteles sartamus (Nixon, 1965)
- Parapanteles scultena (Nixon, 1965)
- Parapanteles shivranginii Sathe & Ingawale, 1989
- Parapanteles sicpolus Valerio & Whitfield, 2009
- Parapanteles sireeshaae Ahmad & Akhtar, 2010
- Parapanteles tessares Valerio & Whitfield, 2009
- Parapanteles thrix Valerio & Whitfield, 2009
- Parapanteles tlinea Valerio & Whitfield, 2009
- Parapanteles transvaalensis (Cameron, 1911)
- Parapanteles turri (Rao & Chalikwar, 1976)
- Parapanteles xanthopholis (de Saeger, 1944)
