= Carlmuesebeckius =

Scientific classification
- Kingdom: Animalia
- Phylum: Arthropoda
- Class: Insecta
- Order: Hymenoptera
- Family: Braconidae
- Subfamily: Microgastrinae
- Genus: Carlmuesebeckius
- Species: C. smithsonian

Binomial name
- Carlmuesebeckius smithsonian Fernandez-Triana & Boudreault, 2018

Genus of wasps

Carlmuesebeckius is a genus of wasp in the family Braconidae. There is at least one described species in Carlmuesebeckius, C. smithsonian, found in Madagascar.
