= Exoryza =

Scientific classification
- Kingdom: Animalia
- Phylum: Arthropoda
- Class: Insecta
- Order: Hymenoptera
- Family: Braconidae
- Subfamily: Microgastrinae
- Genus: Exoryza; Mason, 1981

Genus of wasps

Exoryza is a genus of wasp in the family Braconidae. There are about 15 described species in Exoryza, found throughout most of the world.

== Species ==
These 15 species belong to the genus Exoryza:

- Exoryza asotae (Watanabe, 1932)
- Exoryza belippicola (Liu & You, 1988)
- Exoryza hylas (Wilkinson, 1932)
- Exoryza mariabustosae Fernandez-Triana, 2016
- Exoryza megagaster (de Saeger, 1944)
- Exoryza minnesota Mason, 1981
- Exoryza monocavus Valerio & Whitfield, 2004
- Exoryza oryzae (Walker, 1994)
- Exoryza reticarina Song & Chen, 2003
- Exoryza richardashleyi Fernandez-Triana, 2016
- Exoryza ritaashleyae Fernandez-Triana, 2016
- Exoryza rosamatarritae Fernandez-Triana, 2016
- Exoryza safranum Rousse & Gupta, 2013
- Exoryza schoenobii (Wilkinson, 1932)
- Exoryza yeimycedenoae Fernandez-Triana, 2016
