= Chaoa =

Scientific classification
- Kingdom: Animalia
- Phylum: Arthropoda
- Class: Insecta
- Order: Hymenoptera
- Family: Braconidae
- Subfamily: Microgastrinae
- Genus: Chaoa; Luo & You, 2004
- Species: C. flavipes

Binomial name
- Chaoa flavipes Luo, You & Xiao, 2004

Genus of wasps

Chaoa is a genus of wasp in the family Braconidae. There is at least one described species in Chaoa, C. flavipes, found in China.
