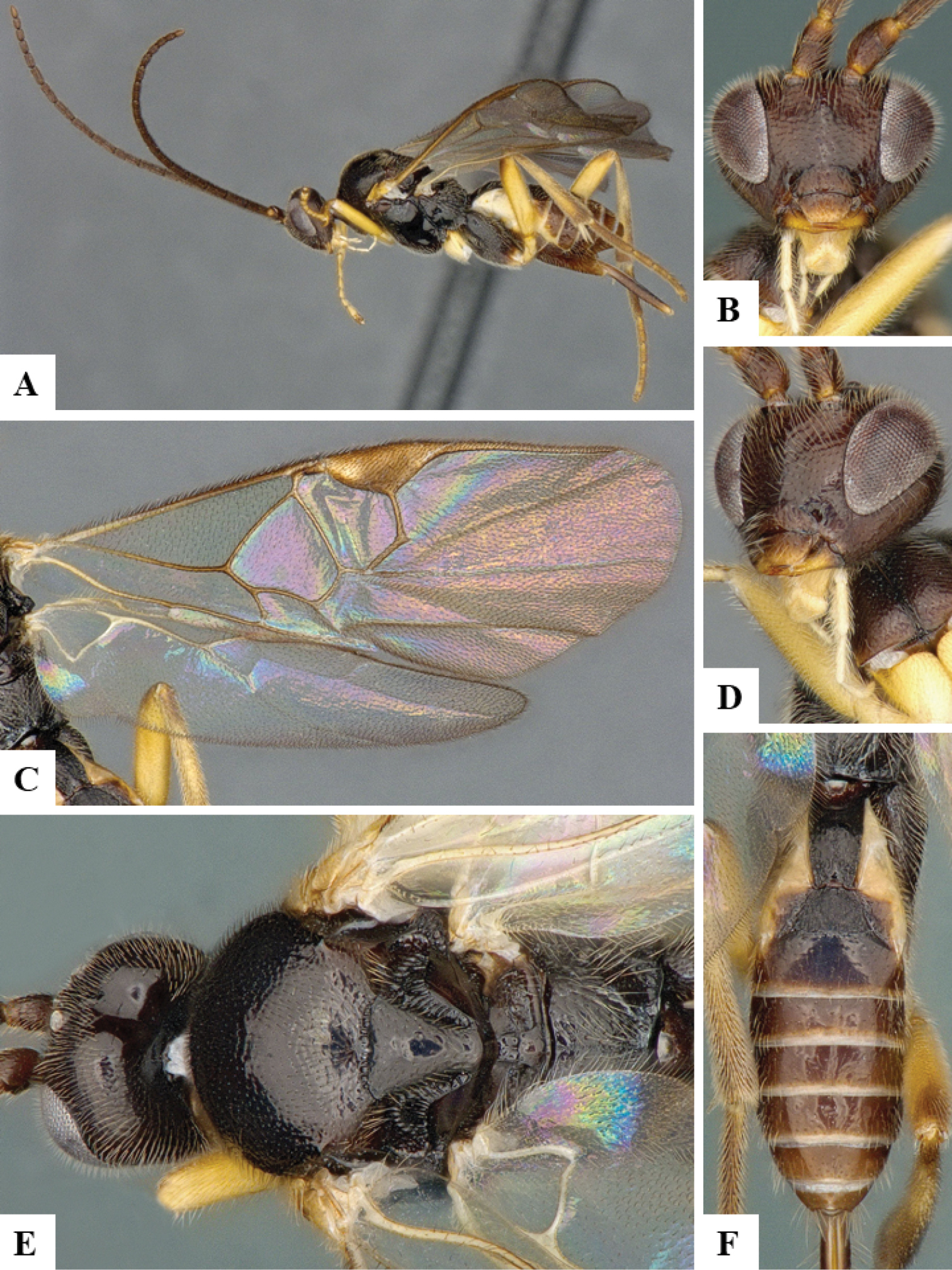
- Lathrapanteles ampyx

Scientific classification
- Kingdom: Animalia
- Phylum: Arthropoda
- Class: Insecta
- Order: Hymenoptera
- Family: Braconidae
- Subfamily: Microgastrinae
- Genus: Lathrapanteles; Williams, 1985

= Lathrapanteles =

Genus of wasps

Lathrapanteles is a genus of wasp in the family Braconidae. There are at least four described species in Lathrapanteles, found in the New World.

== Species ==
These four species belong to the genus Lathrapanteles:

- Lathrapanteles ampyx Williams, 1985
- Lathrapanteles fuscus Williams, 1985
- Lathrapanteles heleios Williams, 1985
- Lathrapanteles papaipemae (Muesebeck, 1921)
