= Silvaspinosus =

Scientific classification
- Kingdom: Animalia
- Phylum: Arthropoda
- Class: Insecta
- Order: Hymenoptera
- Family: Braconidae
- Subfamily: Microgastrinae
- Genus: Silvaspinosus
- Species: S. vespa

Binomial name
- Silvaspinosus vespa Fernandez-Triana & Boudreault, 2018

Genus of wasps

Silvaspinosus is a genus of wasp in the family Braconidae. There is at last one described specie in Silvaspinosus, S. vespa, found in Madagascar.
