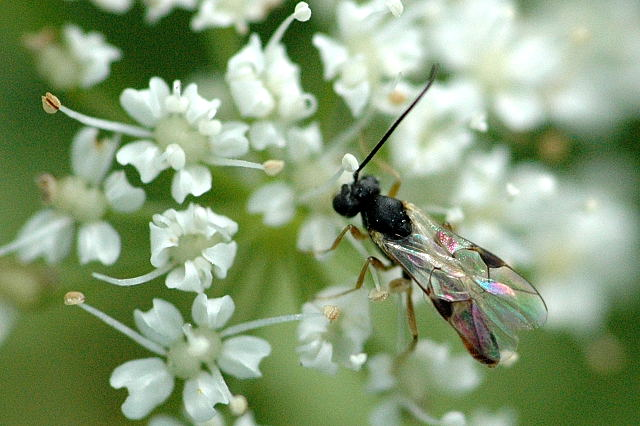
- Cotesia melanoscela

Scientific classification
- Kingdom: Animalia
- Phylum: Arthropoda
- Clade: Pancrustacea
- Class: Insecta
- Order: Hymenoptera
- Superfamily: Ichneumonoidea
- Family: Braconidae
- Subfamily: Microgastrinae

= Microgastrinae =

Subfamily of wasps

Microgastrinae is a subfamily of braconid wasps, encompassing almost 3,000 described species, with an estimated 30,000–50,000 total species. This makes it one of the richest subfamilies with the most species of parasitoid wasps.

== Genera ==
These 84 genera belong to the subfamily Microgastrinae:

- Agupta Fernandez-Triana, 2018
- Alloplitis Nixon, 1965
- Alphomelon Mason, 1981
- Apanteles Förster, 1862
- Austinicotesia Fernandez-Triana, 2018
- Austrocotesia Austin & Dangerfield, 1992
- Beyarslania Koçak & Kemal, 2009
- Billmasonius Fernandez-Triana, 2018
- Buluka de Saeger, 1948
- Carlmuesebeckius Fernandez-Triana, 2018
- Chaoa Luo & You, 2004
- Choeras Mason, 1981
- Clarkinella Mason, 1981
- Cotesia Cameron, 1891
- Cuneogaster Choi & Whitfield, 2006
- Dasylagon Muesebeck, 1958
- Deuterixys Mason, 1981
- Diolcogaster Ashmead, 1900
- Distatrix Mason, 1981
- Dodogaster Rousse, 2013
- Dolichogenidea Viereck, 1911
- Eripnopelta Chen, 2017
- Exix Mason, 1981
- Exoryza Mason, 1981
- Exulonyx Mason, 1981
- Fornicia Brullé, 1846
- Gilbertnixonius Fernandez-Triana, 2018
- Glyptapanteles Asmead, 1904
- Hygroplitis Thomson, 1895
- Hypomicrogaster Ashmead, 1898
- Iconella Mason, 1981
- Illidops Mason, 1981
- Janhalacaste Fernandez-Triana, 2018
- Jenopappius Fernandez-Triana, 2018
- Jimwhitfieldius Fernandez-Triana, 2018
- Keylimepie Fernández-Triana, 2016
- Kiwigaster Fernández-Triana, Whitfield & Ward, 2011
- Kotenkosius Fernandez-Triana, 2018
- Larissimus Nixon, 1965
- Lathrapanteles Williams, 1985
- Mariapanteles Whitfield & Fernández-Triana, 2012
- Markshawius Fernandez-Triana, 2018
- Microgaster Latreille, 1804
- Microplitis Förster, 1862
- Miropotes Nixon, 1965
- Napamus Papp, 1993
- Neoclarkinella Rema & Narendran, 1996
- Nyereria Mason, 1981
- Ohenri Fernandez-Triana, 2018
- Papanteles Mason, 1981
- Parapanteles Ashmead, 1900
- Parenion Nixon, 1965
- Paroplitis Mason, 1981
- Pelicope Mason, 1981
- Philoplitis Nixon, 1965
- Pholetesor Mason, 1981
- Prasmodon Nixon, 1965
- Promicrogaster Brues & Richardson, 1913
- Protapanteles Ashmead, 1898
- Protomicroplitis Ashmead, 1898
- Pseudapanteles Ashmead, 1898
- Pseudofornicia van Achterberg, 2015
- Pseudovenanides Xiao & You, 2002
- Qrocodiledundee Fernandez-Triana, 2018
- Rasivalva Mason, 1981
- Rhygoplitis Mason, 1981
- Sathon Mason, 1981
- Semionis Nixon, 1965
- Sendaphne Nixon, 1965
- Shireplitis Fernández-Triana & Wardan Achterberg, 2013
- Silvaspinosus Fernandez-Triana, 2018
- Snellenius Westwood 1882
- Tobleronius Fernandez-Triana, 2018
- Ungunicus Fernandez-Triana, 2018
- Venanides Mason, 1981
- Venanus Mason, 1981
- Wilkinsonellus Mason, 1981
- Xanthapanteles Whitfield, 1995
- Xanthomicrogaster Cameron, 1911
- Ypsilonigaster Fernandez-Triana, 2018
- Zachterbergius Fernandez-Triana, 2018
- † Dacnusites Cockerell, 1921
- † Eocardiochiles Brues, 1933
- † Palaeomicrogaster Belokobylskij, 2014

== Description and distribution ==
These wasps are small, with 18 segmented antennae. Most species are black or brown, a few are more colorful. Many species are morphologically similar enough to be considered cryptic species. Species within this subfamily have a worldwide distribution. 135 species of Microgastrinae have been confirmed from Canada, though the number may be as high as 275. At least 28 species have been identified from Turkey in Gökçeada and Bozcaada.

== Biology ==
Microgastrinae are koinobiont, primary endoparasitoids of larval Lepidoptera. While most species are solitary, many are gregarious, meaning multiple wasp eggs develop within the same caterpillar. When the eggs hatch the wasp larvae feed on the hemolymph and organs of their host. Once fully developed, the larvae exit the dying caterpillar and immediately spin silken cocoons where they pupate.

Microgastrinae is one of six subfamilies of Braconidae which carry polydnaviruses.

More than 100 species of Microgastrinae have been used in biological control programs.

=== Coevolution with polydnaviruses ===
Microgastrinae need the virus to be able to reproduce. How it is exactly done is by injecting eggs with the proviral genome plus virions into the host's cavity. The virions then infect and discharge their DNA into the host's cells, stopping it from killing the wasp's offspring and instead promoting its growth inside the host's body.

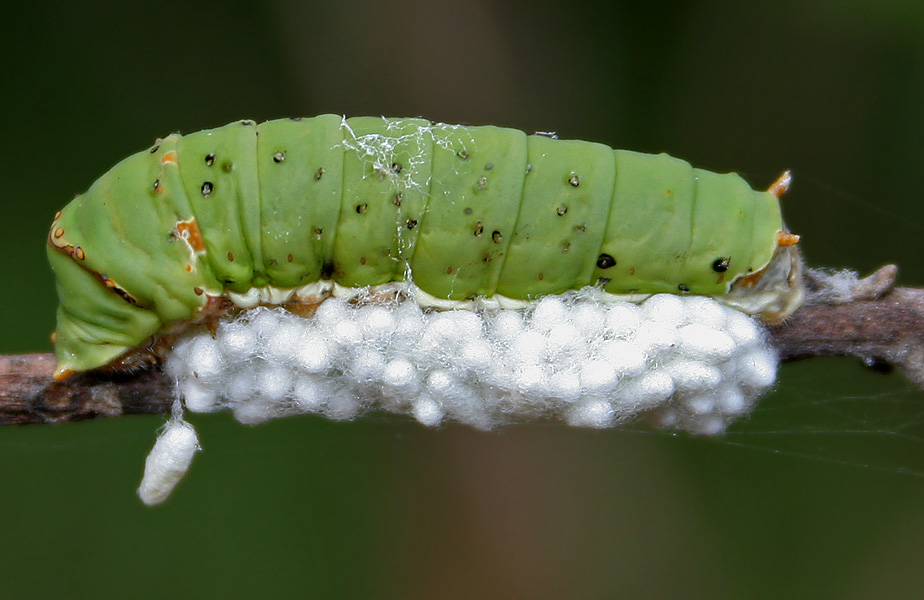
Cocoons of Apanteles wasp and Papilio demoleus caterpillar

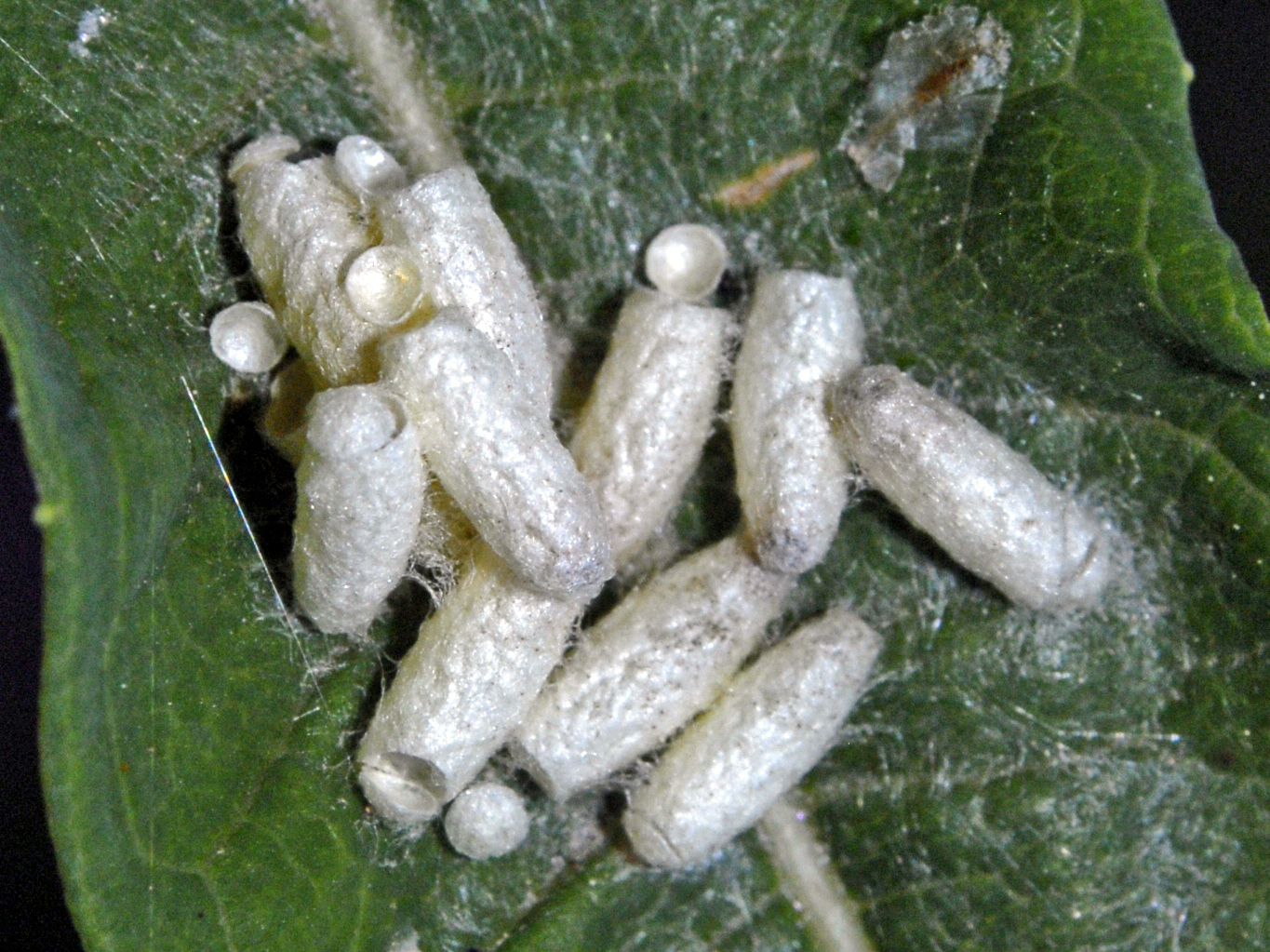
Microgastrinae wasp empty cocoons

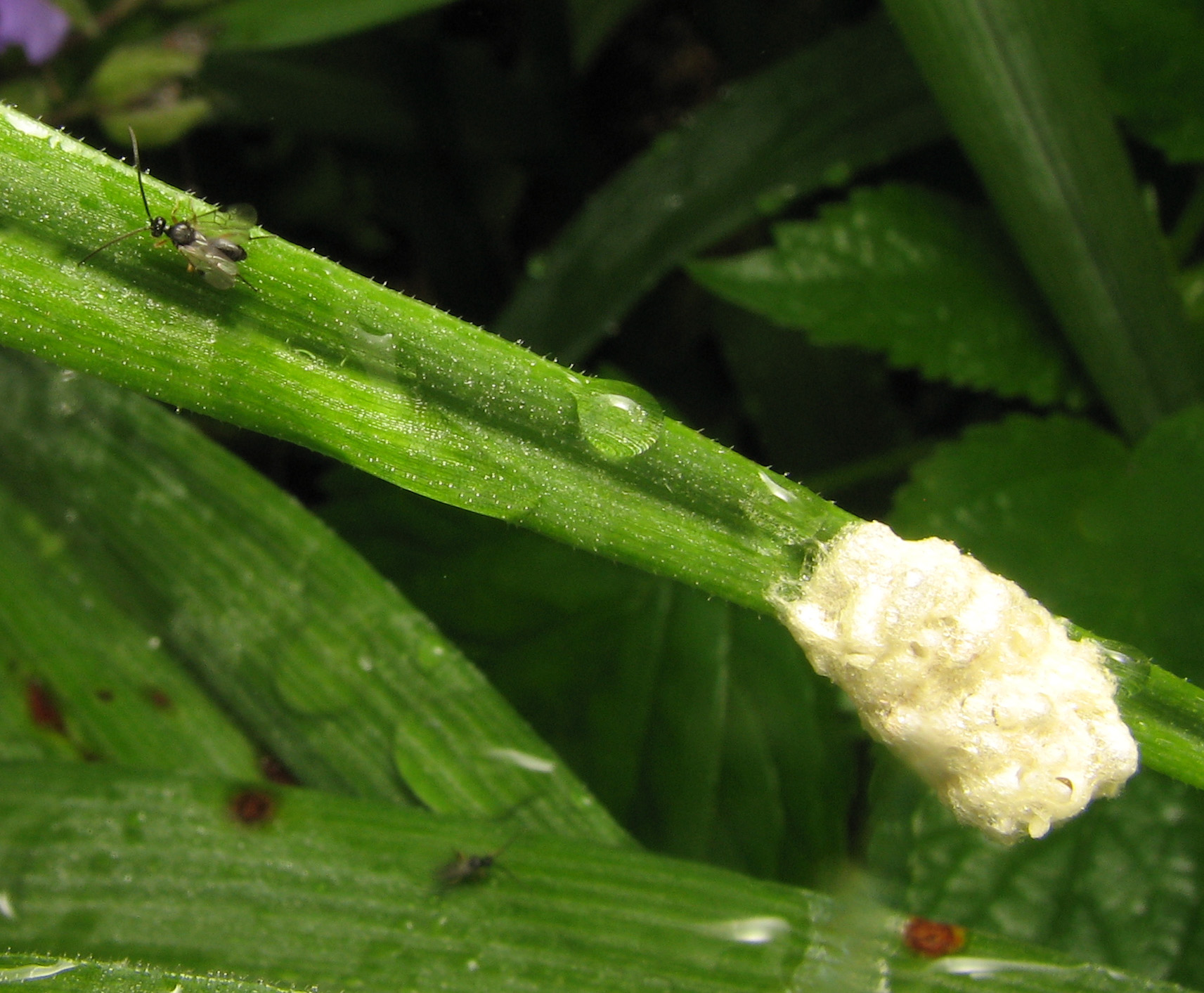
Cotesia cocoons

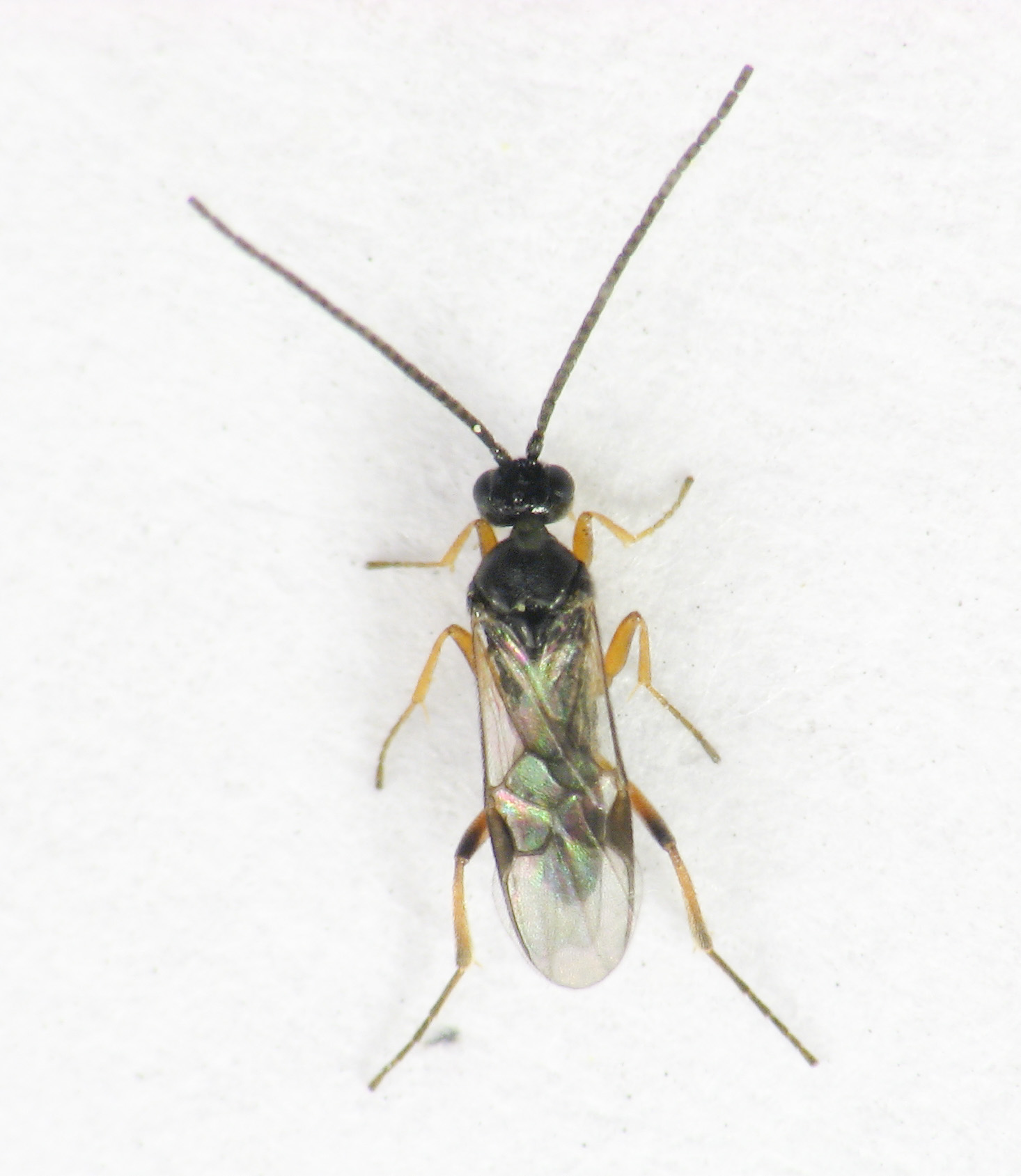
Cotesia adult
