= Nyereria =

Scientific classification
- Kingdom: Animalia
- Phylum: Arthropoda
- Class: Insecta
- Order: Hymenoptera
- Family: Braconidae
- Subfamily: Microgastrinae
- Genus: Nyereria; Mason, 1981

Genus of wasps

Nyereria is a genus of wasp in the family Braconidae. There are around 30 described species in Nyereria. Most species are found in Africa, a few in Asia.

== Species ==
These 29 species belong to the genus Nyereria:

- Nyereria achaeus (de Saeger, 1944)
- Nyereria albicentrus (Long & van Achterberg, 2008)
- Nyereria ankaratrensis (Granger, 1949)
- Nyereria areatus (Granger, 1949)
- Nyereria bicolorata Long & van Achterberg, 2015
- Nyereria bifissa (de Saeger, 1944)
- Nyereria circinus (de Saeger, 1944)
- Nyereria epaphus (de Saeger, 1944)
- Nyereria flavotorquata (Granger, 1949)
- Nyereria forensis (Tobias, 1977)
- Nyereria ganges Rousse & Gupta, 2013
- Nyereria geometrae (Granger, 1949)
- Nyereria hiero (de Saeger, 1944)
- Nyereria ituriensis (de Saeger, 1941)
- Nyereria mayurus Rousse & Gupta, 2013
- Nyereria menuthias (Wilkinson, 1935)
- Nyereria mlanje (Wilkinson, 1929)
- Nyereria neavei (Wilkinson, 1929)
- Nyereria neleus (de Saeger, 1944)
- Nyereria nigricoxis (Wilkinson, 1932)
- Nyereria nioro (Risbec, 1951)
- Nyereria osiris (de Saeger, 1944)
- Nyereria proagynus (Hedqvist, 1965)
- Nyereria rageshri Sathe, 1988
- Nyereria taoi (Watanabe, 1935)
- Nyereria tereus (de Saeger, 1944)
- Nyereria triptolemus (de Saeger, 1944)
- Nyereria vallatae (Watanabe, 1934)
- Nyereria yenthuyensis (Long & van Achterberg, 2008)
