= Prasmodon =

Scientific classification
- Kingdom: Animalia
- Phylum: Arthropoda
- Class: Insecta
- Order: Hymenoptera
- Family: Braconidae
- Subfamily: Microgastrinae
- Genus: Prasmodon; Nixon, 1965

Genus of wasps

Prasmodon is a genus of wasp in the family Braconidae. There are about 18 described species in Prasmodon, found in the Neotropics.

== Species ==
These 18 species belong to the genus Prasmodon:

- Prasmodon almasolisae Fernández-Triana & Whitfield, 2014
- Prasmodon aureus Fernández-Triana & Whitfield, 2014
- Prasmodon bobpoolei Fernández-Triana & Whitfield, 2014
- Prasmodon bobrobbinsi Fernández-Triana & Whitfield, 2014
- Prasmodon dondavisi Fernández-Triana & Whitfield, 2014
- Prasmodon eminens Nixon, 1965
- Prasmodon erenadupontae Braet & Fernández-Triana, 2014
- Prasmodon johnbrowni Fernández-Triana & Whitfield, 2014
- Prasmodon masoni Fernández-Triana & Whitfield, 2014
- Prasmodon mikepoguei Fernández-Triana & Whitfield, 2014
- Prasmodon nixoni Fernández-Triana & Whitfield, 2014
- Prasmodon paulgoldsteini Fernández-Triana & Whitfield, 2014
- Prasmodon scottmilleri Fernández-Triana & Whitfield, 2014
- Prasmodon silvatlanticus Fernández-Triana & Whitfield, 2014
- Prasmodon subfuscus Fernández-Triana & Whitfield, 2014
- Prasmodon tijucaensis Fernández-Triana & Whitfield, 2014
- Prasmodon verhoogdenokus Braet & Fernández-Triana, 2014
- Prasmodon zlotnicki Valerio & Rodriguez, 2005
