= Ypsilonigaster =

Scientific classification
- Kingdom: Animalia
- Phylum: Arthropoda
- Class: Insecta
- Order: Hymenoptera
- Family: Braconidae
- Subfamily: Microgastrinae
- Genus: Ypsilonigaster; Fernandez-Triana, 2018

Genus of wasps

Ypsilonigaster is a genus of wasp in the family Braconidae. There are about six described species in Ypsilonigaster, found in Africa and Indomalaya.

== Species ==
These six species belong to the genus Ypsilonigaster:

- Ypsilonigaster bumbana (de Saeger, 1942) (Congo)
- Ypsilonigaster naturalis Fernandez-Triana & Boudreault, 2018 ( Malaysia)
- Ypsilonigaster pteroloba (de Saeger, 1944) (Congo)
- Ypsilonigaster sharkeyi Fernandez-Triana & Boudreault, 2018 (Congo)
- Ypsilonigaster tiger Fernandez-Triana & Boudreault, 2018 (Thailand)
- Ypsilonigaster zuparkoi Fernandez-Triana & Boudreault, 2018 (Madagascar)
