= Venanus =

Scientific classification
- Kingdom: Animalia
- Phylum: Arthropoda
- Class: Insecta
- Order: Hymenoptera
- Family: Braconidae
- Subfamily: Microgastrinae
- Genus: Venanus; Mason, 1981

Genus of wasps

Venanus is a genus of wasp in the family Braconidae. There are about 11 described species in Venanus, found in the New World.

== Species ==
These 11 species belong to the genus Venanus:

- Venanus chilensis Mason, 1981
- Venanus greeneyi Whitfield & Arias-Penna, 2011
- Venanus heberti Fernández-Triana, 2010
- Venanus helavai Mason, 1981
- Venanus johnnyrosalesi Fernández-Triana & Whitfield, 2014
- Venanus kusikuyllurae Rasmussen & Whitfield, 2011
- Venanus minutalis (Muesebeck, 1958)
- Venanus peruensis Mason, 1981
- Venanus pinicola Mason, 1981
- Venanus randallgarciai Fernández-Triana & Whitfield, 2014
- Venanus yanayacuensis Arias-Penna & Whitfield, 2011
