= Dodogaster =

Scientific classification
- Domain: Eukaryota
- Kingdom: Animalia
- Phylum: Arthropoda
- Class: Insecta
- Order: Hymenoptera
- Family: Braconidae
- Subfamily: Microgastrinae
- Genus: Dodogaster; Rousse, 2013
- Species: D. grangeri

Binomial name
- Dodogaster grangeri Rousse, 2013

Genus of wasps

Dodogaster is a genus of braconid wasps. It currently consists only of the type species Dodogaster grangeri, found in Africa and also described by Rousse & Gupta, 2013
