= Kiwigaster =

Scientific classification
- Kingdom: Animalia
- Phylum: Arthropoda
- Class: Insecta
- Order: Hymenoptera
- Family: Braconidae
- Subfamily: Microgastrinae
- Genus: Kiwigaster; Fernández-Triana, Whitfield & Ward, 2011
- Species: K. variabilis

Binomial name
- Kiwigaster variabilis Fernández-Triana & Ward, 2011

Genus of wasps

Kiwigaster is a genus of wasp in the family Braconidae. There is at least one described species in Kiwigaster, K. variabilis, found in New Zealand.
