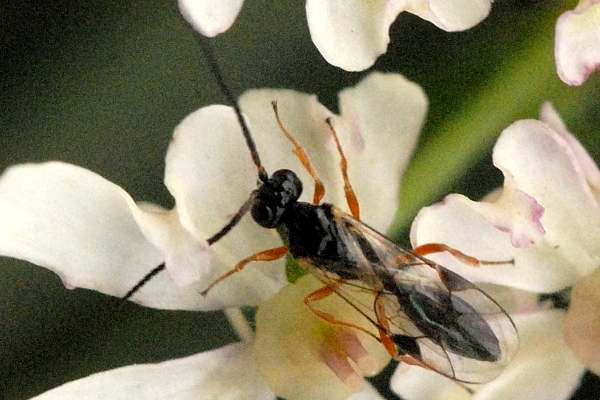
- Hygroplitis rugulosus

Scientific classification
- Kingdom: Animalia
- Phylum: Arthropoda
- Class: Insecta
- Order: Hymenoptera
- Family: Braconidae
- Subfamily: Microgastrinae
- Genus: Hygroplitis; Thomson, 1895

= Hygroplitis =

Genus of wasps

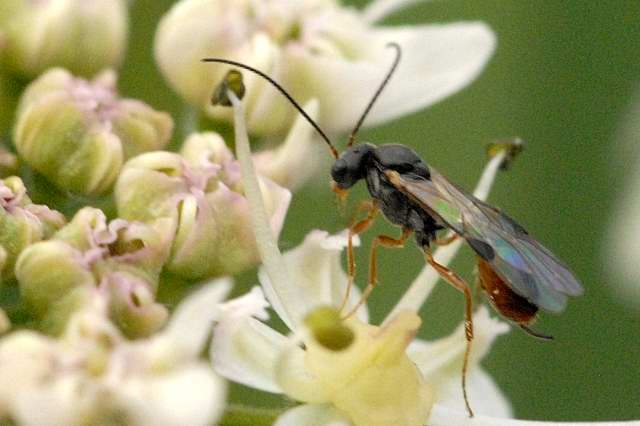
Hygroplitis rugulosus

Hygroplitis is a genus of wasp in the family Braconidae. There are about nine described species in Hygroplitis, found in the Holarctic.

== Species ==
These nine species belong to the genus Hygroplitis:

- Hygroplitis basarukini Kotenko, 1993
- Hygroplitis melligaster (Provancher, 1886)
- Hygroplitis nigritus Luo & You, 2005
- Hygroplitis pseudorussatus Shaw, 1992
- Hygroplitis rugulosus (Nees, 1834)
- Hygroplitis ruinosus Kotenko, 2007
- Hygroplitis russatus (Haliday, 1834)
- Hygroplitis sinicus (Xu & He, 2000)
- Hygroplitis toritarsis Song & Chen, 2004
