= Jenopappius =

Scientific classification
- Kingdom: Animalia
- Phylum: Arthropoda
- Class: Insecta
- Order: Hymenoptera
- Family: Braconidae
- Subfamily: Microgastrinae
- Genus: Jenopappius; Fernandez-Triana, 2018

Genus of wasps

Jenopappius is a genus of wasp in the family Braconidae. There are at least three described species in Jenopappius, found in Africa.

== Species ==
These three species belong to the genus Jenopappius:

- Jenopappius aethiopicus (de Saeger, 1944)
- Jenopappius magyarmuzeum Fernandez-Triana & Boudreault, 2018
- Jenopappius niger (de Saeger, 1944)
