= Buluka =

Scientific classification
- Kingdom: Animalia
- Phylum: Arthropoda
- Class: Insecta
- Order: Hymenoptera
- Family: Braconidae
- Subfamily: Microgastrinae
- Genus: Buluka de Saeger, 1948

Genus of wasps

Buluka is a genus of wasp in the family Braconidae. There are about 11 described species in Buluka, found in Indomalaya, Africa, and China.

== Species ==
These 11 species belong to the genus Buluka:

- Buluka achterbergi Austin, 1989
- Buluka collessi Austin & Dangerfield, 1992
- Buluka horni Gupta, 2013
- Buluka huddlestoni Austin, 1989
- Buluka noyesi Austin, 1989
- Buluka orientalis Chou, 1985
- Buluka quickei Ranjith, 2015
- Buluka straeleni de Saeger, 1948
- Buluka taiwanensis Austin, 1989
- Buluka townesi Austin, 1989
- Buluka vuquangensis Long, 2015
