= Pseudapanteles =

Scientific classification
- Kingdom: Animalia
- Phylum: Arthropoda
- Class: Insecta
- Order: Hymenoptera
- Family: Braconidae
- Subfamily: Microgastrinae
- Genus: Pseudapanteles; Ashmead, 1898

Genus of wasps

Pseudapanteles is a genus of wasp in the family Braconidae. There are more than 30 described species in Pseudapanteles. They are found primarily in the Neotropics, although three species are found in North America.

== Species ==
These 36 species belong to the genus Pseudapanteles:

- Pseudapanteles abantidas (Nixon, 1965)
- Pseudapanteles alfiopivai Fernández-Triana & Whitfield, 2014
- Pseudapanteles alvaroumanai Fernández-Triana & Whitfield, 2014
- Pseudapanteles analorenaguevarae Fernández-Triana & Whitfield, 2014
- Pseudapanteles annulicornis Ashmead, 1900
- Pseudapanteles brunneus Ashmead, 1900
- Pseudapanteles carlosespinachi Fernández-Triana & Whitfield, 2014
- Pseudapanteles carlosrodriguezi Fernández-Triana & Whitfield, 2014
- Pseudapanteles christianafigueresae Fernández-Triana & Whitfield, 2014
- Pseudapanteles dignus (Muesebeck, 1938)
- Pseudapanteles gouleti Fernández-Triana, 2010
- Pseudapanteles hernanbravoi Fernández-Triana & Whitfield, 2014
- Pseudapanteles jorgerodriguezi Fernández-Triana & Whitfield, 2014
- Pseudapanteles josefigueresi Fernández-Triana & Whitfield, 2014
- Pseudapanteles laurachinchillae Fernández-Triana & Whitfield, 2014
- Pseudapanteles lipomeringis (Muesebeck, 1958)
- Pseudapanteles luisguillermosolisi Fernández-Triana & Whitfield, 2014
- Pseudapanteles margaritapenonae Fernández-Triana & Whitfield, 2014
- Pseudapanteles mariobozai Fernández-Triana & Whitfield, 2014
- Pseudapanteles mariocarvajali Fernández-Triana & Whitfield, 2014
- Pseudapanteles maureenballesteroae Fernández-Triana & Whitfield, 2014
- Pseudapanteles moerens (Nixon, 1965)
- Pseudapanteles munifigueresae Fernández-Triana & Whitfield, 2014
- Pseudapanteles nerion (Nixon, 1965)
- Pseudapanteles nigrovariatus (Muesebeck, 1921)
- Pseudapanteles oscarariasi Fernández-Triana & Whitfield, 2014
- Pseudapanteles ottonsolisi Fernández-Triana & Whitfield, 2014
- Pseudapanteles pedroleoni Fernández-Triana & Whitfield, 2014
- Pseudapanteles raulsolorzanoi Fernández-Triana & Whitfield, 2014
- Pseudapanteles renecastroi Fernández-Triana & Whitfield, 2014
- Pseudapanteles rodrigogamezi Fernández-Triana & Whitfield, 2014
- Pseudapanteles rosemarykarpinskiae Fernández-Triana & Whitfield, 2014
- Pseudapanteles ruficollis (Cameron, 1911)
- Pseudapanteles sesiae (Viereck, 1912)
- Pseudapanteles soniapicadoae Fernández-Triana & Whitfield, 2014
- Pseudapanteles teofilodelatorrei Fernández-Triana & Whitfield, 2014
