= Alphomelon =

Scientific classification
- Kingdom: Animalia
- Phylum: Arthropoda
- Class: Insecta
- Order: Hymenoptera
- Family: Braconidae
- Subfamily: Microgastrinae
- Genus: Alphomelon; Mason, 1981

Genus of wasps

Alphomelon is a genus of wasp in the family Braconidae. There are at least 19 described species in Alphomelon, found in North, Central, and South America.

== Species ==
These species belong to the genus Alphomelon:

- Alphomelon arecaphile Deans, 2003
- Alphomelon brachymacher Deans, 2003
- Alphomelon brasiliensis Shimabukuro & Penteado-Dias, 2003
- Alphomelon bromeliphile Deans, 2003
- Alphomelon citroloma Deans, 2003
- Alphomelon conforme (Muesebeck, 1958)
- Alphomelon crocostethus Deans, 2003
- Alphomelon disputabile (Ashmead, 1900)
- Alphomelon melanoscelis Deans, 2003
- Alphomelon nanosoma Deans, 2003
- Alphomelon nigriceps (Ashmead, 1900)
- Alphomelon paurogenum Deans, 2003
- Alphomelon pyrrhogluteum Deans, 2003
- Alphomelon rhyssocercus Deans, 2003
- Alphomelon rugosum Shimabukuro & Penteado-Dias, 2003
- Alphomelon simpsonorum Deans, 2003
- Alphomelon talidicida (Wilkinson, 1931)
- Alphomelon winniewertzae Deans, 2003
- Alphomelon xestopyga Deans, 2003
