= Exulonyx =

Scientific classification
- Kingdom: Animalia
- Phylum: Arthropoda
- Class: Insecta
- Order: Hymenoptera
- Family: Braconidae
- Subfamily: Microgastrinae
- Genus: Exulonyx; Mason, 1981
- Species: E. camma

Binomial name
- Exulonyx camma (Nixon, 1965)

Genus of wasps

Exulonyx is a genus of wasp in the family Braconidae. There is at least one described species in Exulonyx, E. camma, found in South Africa.
