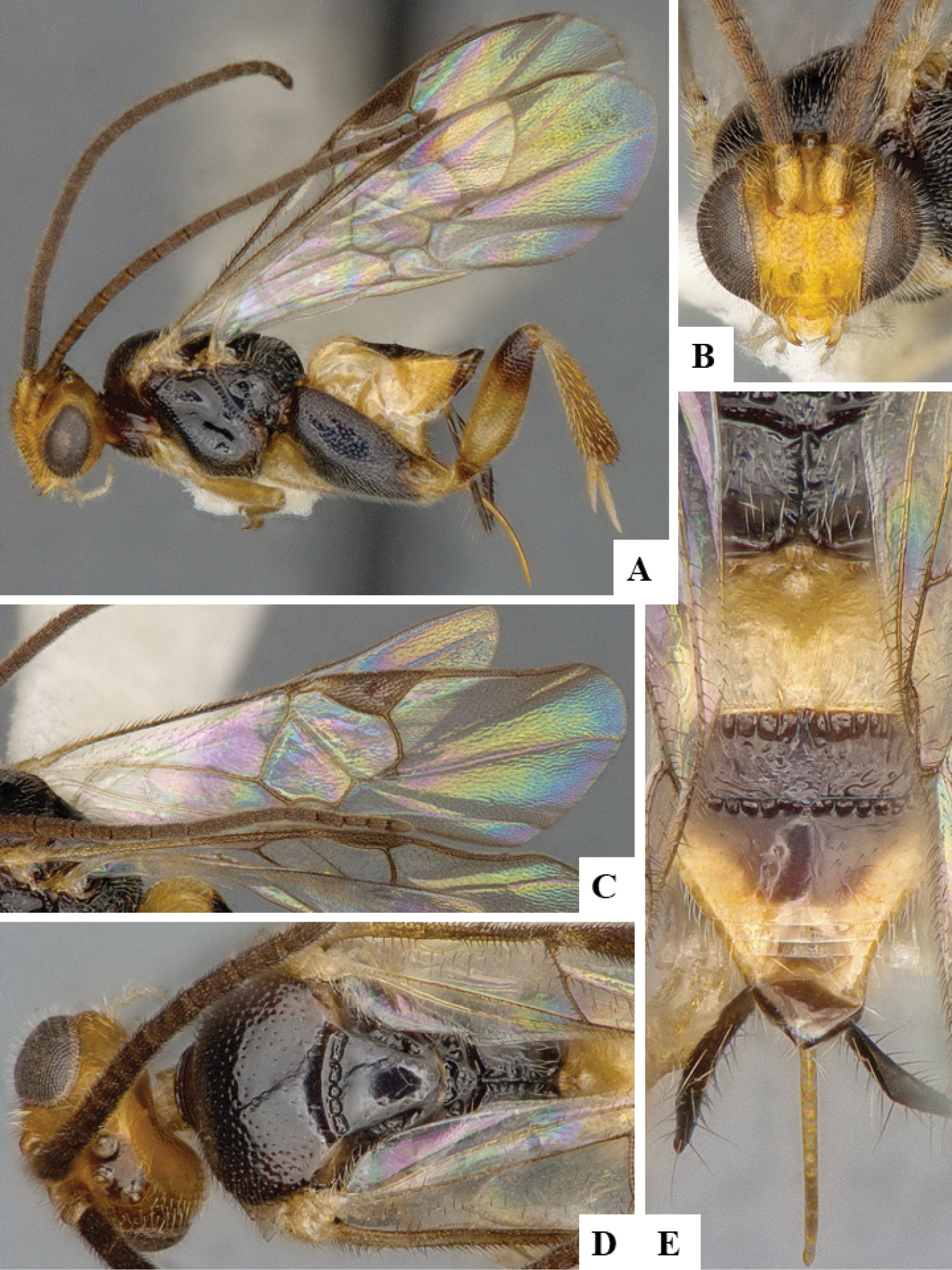
- Xanthomicrogaster pelides

Scientific classification
- Kingdom: Animalia
- Phylum: Arthropoda
- Class: Insecta
- Order: Hymenoptera
- Family: Braconidae
- Subfamily: Microgastrinae
- Genus: Xanthomicrogaster; Cameron, 1911

= Xanthomicrogaster =

Genus of wasps

Xanthomicrogaster is a genus of wasp in the family Braconidae. There are about six described species in Xanthomicrogaster, found in the Neotropics.

== Species ==
These six species belong to the genus Xanthomicrogaster:

- Xanthomicrogaster fortipes Cameron, 1911
- Xanthomicrogaster maculata Penteado-Dias, Shimabukuro & van Achterberg, 2002
- Xanthomicrogaster otamendi Martínez, 2018
- Xanthomicrogaster pelides Nixon, 1965
- Xanthomicrogaster sayjuhu Martínez, 2018
- Xanthomicrogaster seres Nixon, 1965
