= Billmasonius =

Scientific classification
- Kingdom: Animalia
- Phylum: Arthropoda
- Class: Insecta
- Order: Hymenoptera
- Family: Braconidae
- Subfamily: Microgastrinae
- Genus: Billmasonius
- Species: B. cienci

Binomial name
- Billmasonius cienci Fernandez-Triana & Boudreault, 2018

Genus of wasps

Billmasonius is a genus of wasp in the family Braconidae. There is at least one described species in Billmasonius, B. cienci, found in Thailand.
