= Markshawius =

Scientific classification
- Kingdom: Animalia
- Phylum: Arthropoda
- Class: Insecta
- Order: Hymenoptera
- Family: Braconidae
- Subfamily: Microgastrinae
- Genus: Markshawius; Fernandez-Triana, 2018

Genus of wasps

Markshawius is a genus of wasp in the family Braconidae. There are at least three described species in Markshawius.

== Species ==
These three species belong to the genus Markshawius:

- Markshawius erucidoctus Fernandez-Triana & Boudreault, 2018 (Vietnam)
- Markshawius francescae Fernandez-Triana & Boudreault, 2018 (Nepal, Vietnam, Thailand)
- Markshawius thailandensis Fernandez-Triana & Boudreault, 2018 (Thailand)
