= Iconella =

Scientific classification
- Kingdom: Animalia
- Phylum: Arthropoda
- Class: Insecta
- Order: Hymenoptera
- Family: Braconidae
- Subfamily: Microgastrinae
- Genus: Iconella; Mason, 1981

Genus of wasps

Iconella is a genus of wasp in the family Braconidae. There are about 38 described species in Iconella, found throughout most of the world.

== Species ==
These 38 species belong to the genus Iconella:

- Iconella aeolus (Nixon, 1965)
- Iconella albinervis (Tobias, 1964)
- Iconella alfalfae (Nixon, 1960)
- Iconella andydeansi Fernández-Triana, 2013
- Iconella argante (Nixon, 1976)
- Iconella assabensis (Shenefelt, 1972)
- Iconella cajani (Wilkinson, 1928)
- Iconella canadensis Fernández-Triana, 2013
- Iconella compressiabdominis (You & Tong, 1991)
- Iconella detrectans (Wilkinson, 1928)
- Iconella etiellae (Viereck, 1911)
- Iconella fedtschenkoi (Kotenko, 1986)
- Iconella inula Papp, 2012
- Iconella isolata (Muesebeck, 1955)
- Iconella isus (Nixon, 1965)
- Iconella jason (Nixon, 1965)
- Iconella jayjayrodriguezae Fernández-Triana, 2013
- Iconella lacteoides (Nixon, 1965)
- Iconella lynceus (Nixon, 1965)
- Iconella masallensis (Abdinbekova, 1969)
- Iconella memorata Kotenko, 2007
- Iconella mera (Kotenko, 1992)
- Iconella merata (Kotenko, 1981)
- Iconella merula (Reinhard, 1880)
- Iconella meruloides (Nixon, 1965)
- Iconella mongashtensis Zargar & Gupta, 2019
- Iconella myeloenta (Wilkinson, 1937)
- Iconella nagyi (Papp, 1975)
- Iconella oppugnator (Papp, 1974)
- Iconella pyrene (Nixon, 1965)
- Iconella rudolphae (Kotenko, 1986)
- Iconella similus Zargar & Gupta, 2019
- Iconella subcamilla (Tobias, 1976)
- Iconella tedanius (Nixon, 1965)
- Iconella turanica (Telenga, 1955)
- Iconella valiko Kotenko, 2007
- Iconella verae (Tobias, 1976)
- Iconella vindicius (Nixon, 1965)
