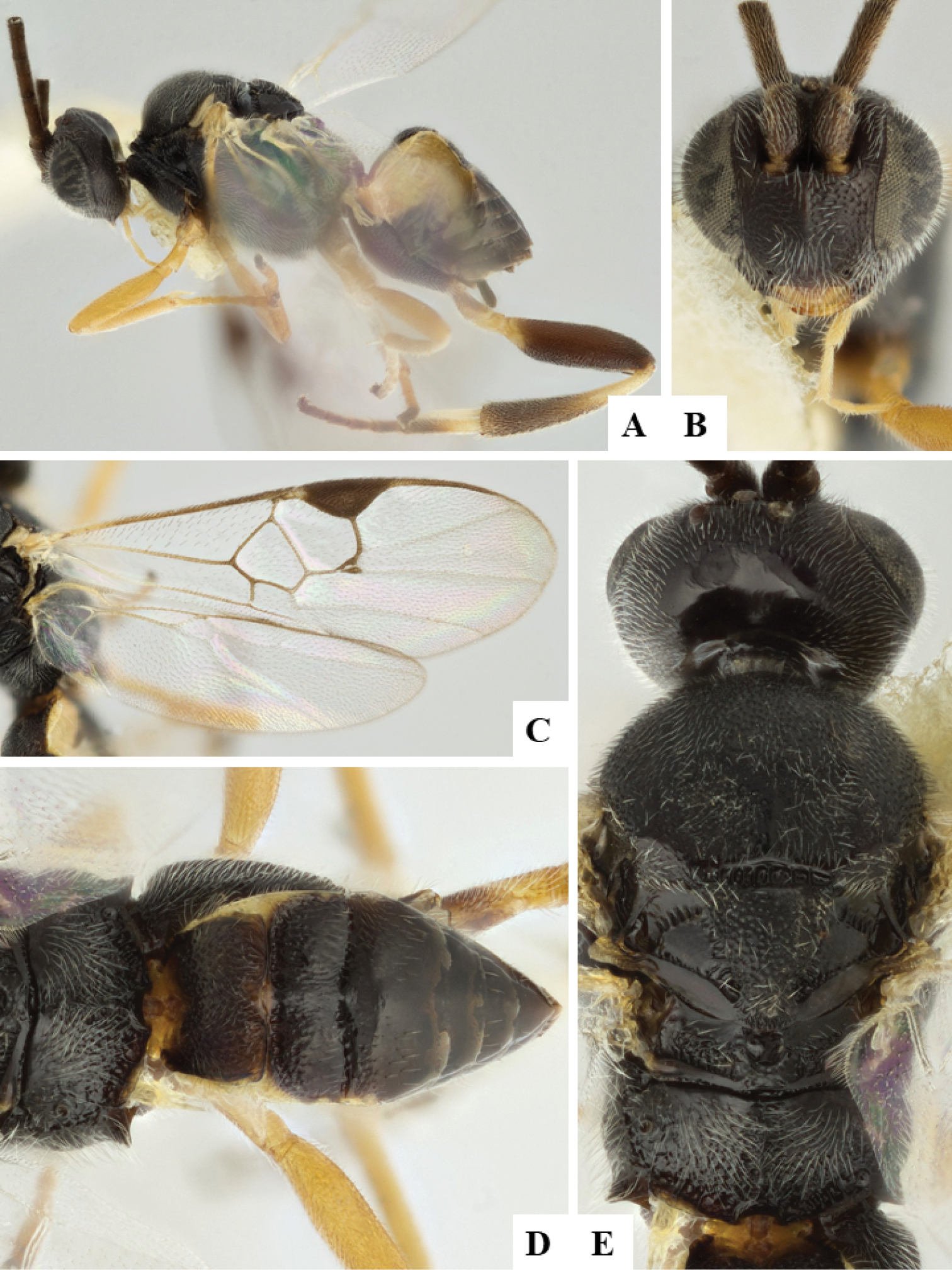
- Exix columbica

Scientific classification
- Kingdom: Animalia
- Phylum: Arthropoda
- Class: Insecta
- Order: Hymenoptera
- Family: Braconidae
- Subfamily: Microgastrinae
- Genus: Exix; Mason, 1981

= Exix =

Genus of insects

Exix is a genus of wasp in the family Braconidae. There are about seven described species in Exix, found in North, Central, and South America.

== Species ==
These seven species belong to the genus Exix:

- Exix bahia Mason, 1981
- Exix colorados Mason, 1981
- Exix columbica Mason, 1981
- Exix itatiaia Souza-Gessner, Bortoni & Penteado-Dias, 2016
- Exix mexicana Mason, 1981
- Exix schunkei (Nixon, 1965)
- Exix tinalandica Mason, 1981
