= Ungunicus =

Scientific classification
- Kingdom: Animalia
- Phylum: Arthropoda
- Class: Insecta
- Order: Hymenoptera
- Family: Braconidae
- Subfamily: Microgastrinae
- Genus: Ungunicus
- Species: U. vietnamensis

Binomial name
- Ungunicus vietnamensis Fernandez-Triana & Boudreault, 2018

Genus of wasps

Ungunicus is a genus of wasp in the family Braconidae. There is at least one described species in Ungunicus, U. vietnamensis, found in Vietnam.
