= Gilbertnixonius =

Scientific classification
- Kingdom: Animalia
- Phylum: Arthropoda
- Class: Insecta
- Order: Hymenoptera
- Family: Braconidae
- Subfamily: Microgastrinae
- Genus: Gilbertnixonius
- Species: G. biem

Binomial name
- Gilbertnixonius biem Fernandez-Triana & Boudreault, 2018

Genus of wasps

Gilbertnixonius is a genus of wasp in the family Braconidae. There is at least one described species in Gilbertnixonius, G. biem, found in Thailand. The genus is named after G. E. J. Nixon.
