= Mariapanteles =

Scientific classification
- Kingdom: Animalia
- Phylum: Arthropoda
- Class: Insecta
- Order: Hymenoptera
- Family: Braconidae
- Subfamily: Microgastrinae
- Genus: Mariapanteles; Whitfield & Fernández-Triana, 2012

Genus of wasps

Mariapanteles is a genus of wasp in the family Braconidae. There are at least two described species in Mariapanteles.

== Species ==
These two species belong to the genus Mariapanteles:

- Mariapanteles dapkeyae Fernández-Triana, 2012 (Brazil)
- Mariapanteles felipei Whitfield, 2012 (Costa Rica)
