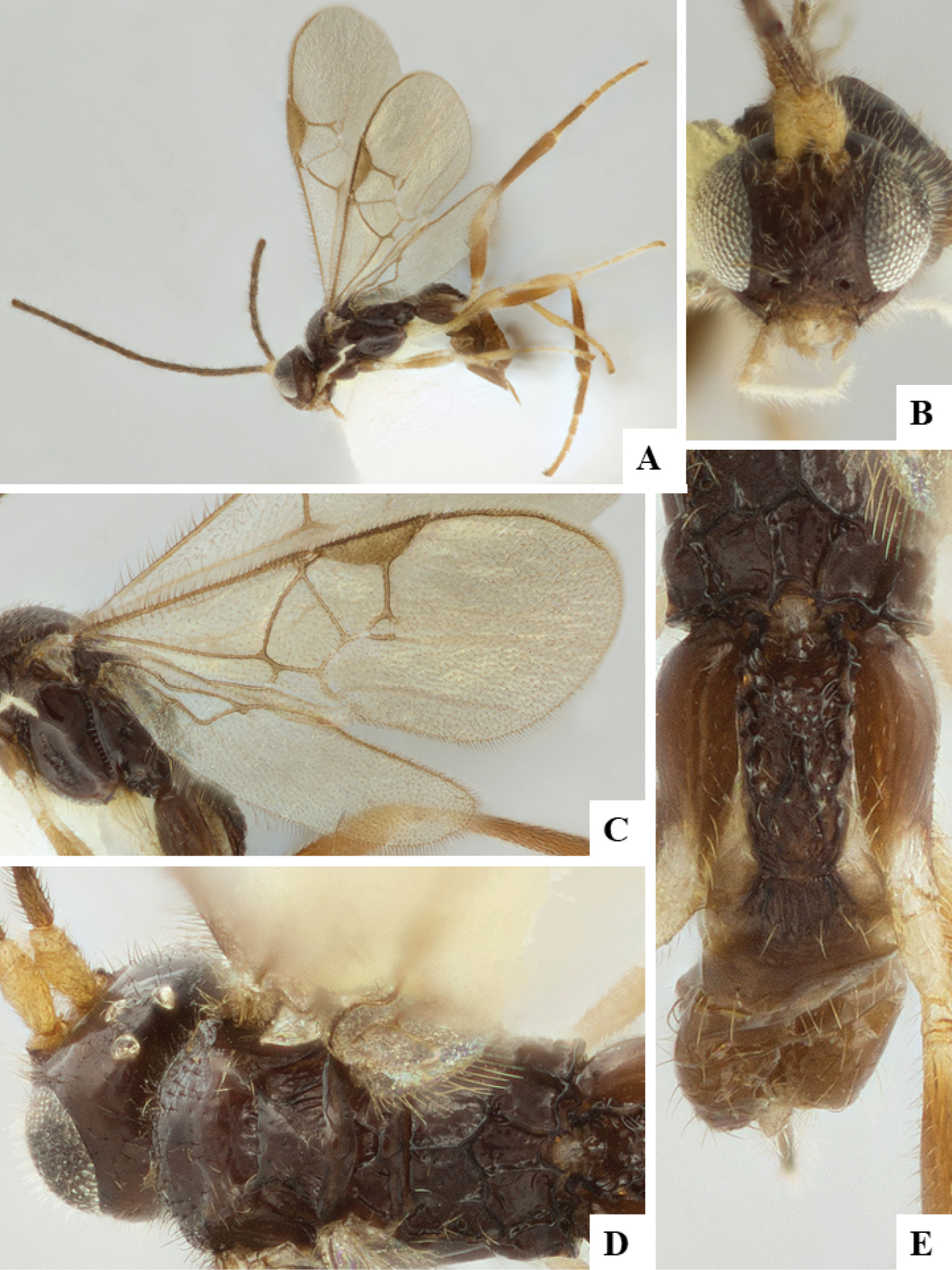
- Austrocotesia exigua

Scientific classification
- Kingdom: Animalia
- Phylum: Arthropoda
- Class: Insecta
- Order: Hymenoptera
- Family: Braconidae
- Subfamily: Microgastrinae
- Genus: Austrocotesia; Austin & Dangerfield, 1992

= Austrocotesia =

Genus of wasps

Austrocotesia is a genus of wasp in the family Braconidae. There are about five described species in Austrocotesia, found in Oceania and the Neotropics.

== Species ==
These five species belong to the genus Austrocotesia:

- Austrocotesia croizati Valerio & Whitfield, 2005 (Colombia, Ecuador)
- Austrocotesia delicata Austin & Dangerfield, 1992 (Australia, Papua New Guinea)
- Austrocotesia exigua Austin & Dangerfield, 1992 (Papua New Guinea)
- Austrocotesia paradoxa Austin & Dangerfield, 1992 (Papua New Guinea)
- Austrocotesia renei Valerio & Whitfield, 2005 (Ecuador)
