= Pseudovenanides =

Scientific classification
- Kingdom: Animalia
- Phylum: Arthropoda
- Class: Insecta
- Order: Hymenoptera
- Family: Braconidae
- Subfamily: Microgastrinae
- Genus: Pseudovenanides; Xiao & You, 2002
- Species: P. hunanus

Binomial name
- Pseudovenanides hunanus Xiao & You, 2002

Genus of wasps

Pseudovenanides is a genus of wasp in the family Braconidae. There is at least one described species in Pseudovenanides, P. hunanus, found in China.
