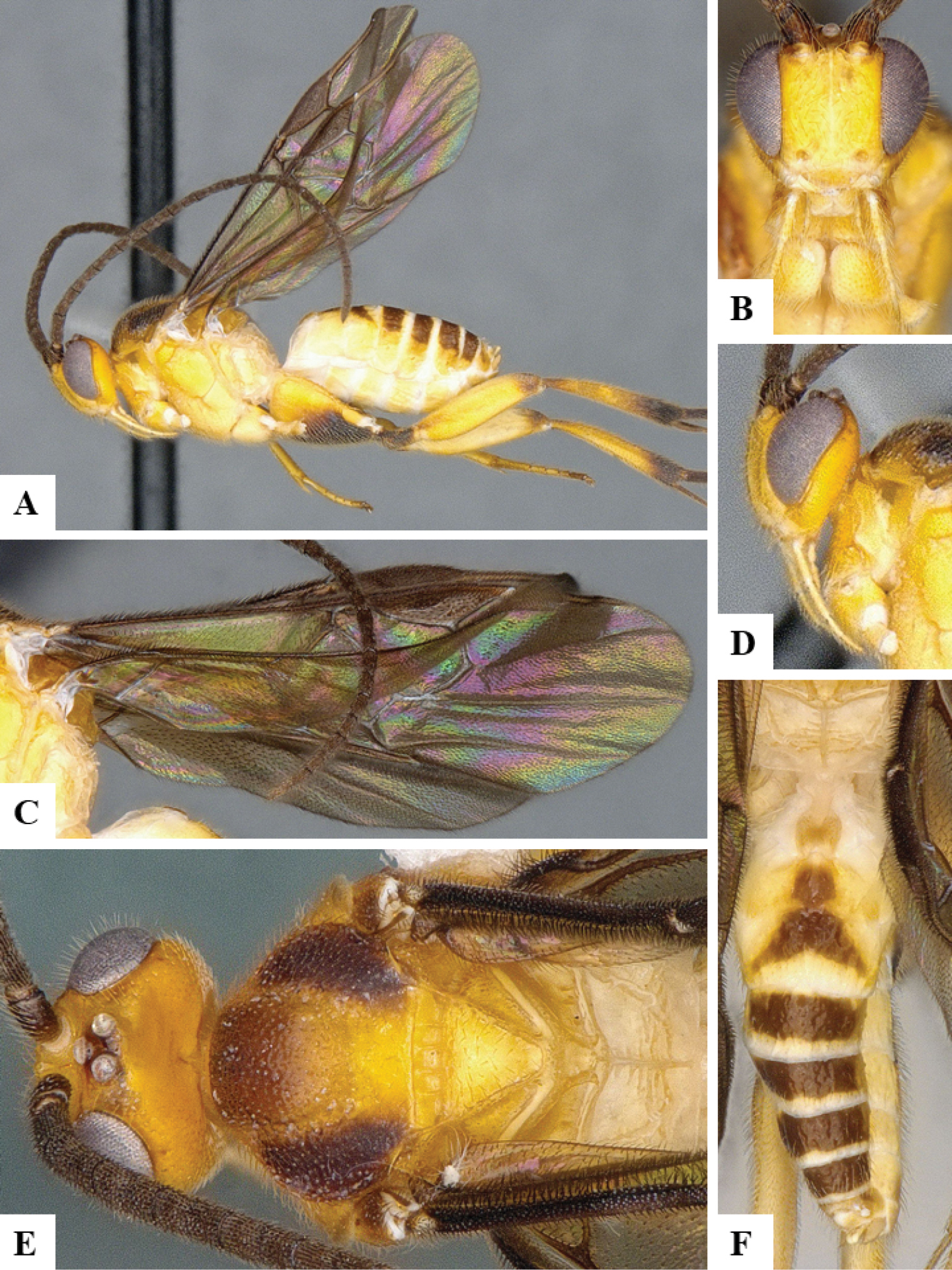
- Wilkinsonellus alexsmithi

Scientific classification
- Kingdom: Animalia
- Phylum: Arthropoda
- Class: Insecta
- Order: Hymenoptera
- Family: Braconidae
- Subfamily: Microgastrinae
- Genus: Wilkinsonellus; Mason, 1981

= Wilkinsonellus =

Genus of wasps

Wilkinsonellus is a genus of wasp in the family Braconidae. There are more than 20 described species in Wilkinsonellus, generally found in warmer parts of the globe.

== Species ==
These species belong to the genus Wilkinsonellus:

- Wilkinsonellus alexsmithi Arias-Penna & Whitfield, 2013 (Costa Rica)
- Wilkinsonellus amplus Austin & Dangerfield, 1992 (Australia)
- Wilkinsonellus arabicus van Achterberg & Fernandez-Triana, 2017 (Yemen)
- Wilkinsonellus corpustriacolor Arias-Penna, Zhang & Whitfield, 2014 (Fiji)
- Wilkinsonellus daira (Nixon, 1965) (Papua New Guinea)
- Wilkinsonellus fijiensis Arias-Penna, Zhang & Whitfield, 2014 (Fiji)
- Wilkinsonellus flavicrus Long & van Achterberg, 2011 (Vietnam)
- Wilkinsonellus granulatus Ahmad, Pandey, Haider & Shujauddin, 2005 (India)
- Wilkinsonellus henicopus (de Saeger, 1944) (Congo, Kenya)
- Wilkinsonellus iphitus (Nixon, 1965) (China, Philippines)
- Wilkinsonellus kogui Arias-Penna & Whitfield, 2013 (Colombia)
- Wilkinsonellus longicentrus Long & van Achterberg, 2003 (Vietnam)
- Wilkinsonellus masoni Long & van Achterberg, 2011 (Vietnam)
- Wilkinsonellus narangahus Rousse & Gupta, 2013 (Réunion)
- Wilkinsonellus nescalptura Arias-Penna, Zhang & Whitfield, 2014 (Fiji)
- Wilkinsonellus nigratus Long & van Achterberg, 2011 (Vietnam)
- Wilkinsonellus nigrocentrus Long & van Achterberg, 2011 (Vietnam)
- Wilkinsonellus panamaensis Arias-Penna & Whitfield, 2013 (Panama)
- Wilkinsonellus paramplus Long & van Achterberg, 2003 (China, Vietnam)
- Wilkinsonellus striatus Austin & Dangerfield, 1992 (Australia, Papua New Guinea)
- Wilkinsonellus thyone (Nixon, 1965) (Philippines)
- Wilkinsonellus tobiasi Long, 2007 (Vietnam)
- Wilkinsonellus tomi Austin & Dangerfield, 1992 (Australia, Papua New Guinea)
