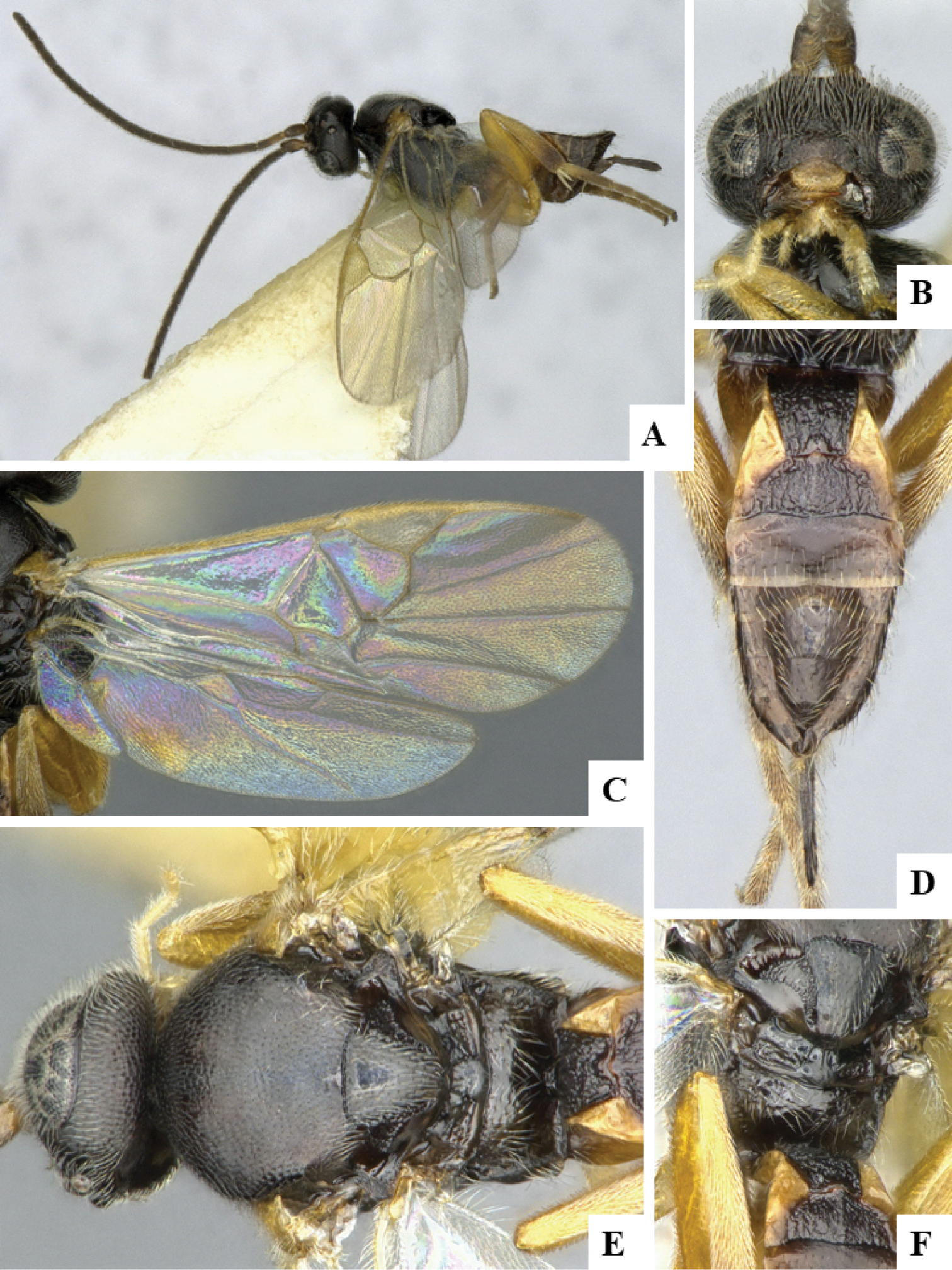
- Pholetesor laetus

Scientific classification
- Kingdom: Animalia
- Phylum: Arthropoda
- Class: Insecta
- Order: Hymenoptera
- Family: Braconidae
- Subfamily: Microgastrinae
- Genus: Pholetesor; Mason, 1981

= Pholetesor =

Genus of wasps

Pholetesor is a genus of wasp in the family Braconidae. There are more than 50 described species in Pholetesor, found mainly in the Holarctic.

== Species ==
These 57 species belong to the genus Pholetesor:

- Pholetesor acricauda Liu & Chen, 2016
- Pholetesor acutus (Papp, 1971)
- Pholetesor ambiguus (Papp, 1977)
- Pholetesor argyresthiae Liu & Chen, 2016
- Pholetesor arisba (Nixon, 1973)
- Pholetesor artusisulcus Liu & Chen, 2016
- Pholetesor bedelliae (Viereck, 1911)
- Pholetesor bicolor (Nees, 1874)
- Pholetesor brevivalvatus (Balevski & Tobias, 1980)
- Pholetesor bucculatricis (Muesebeck, 1921)
- Pholetesor caloptiliae Whitfield, 2006
- Pholetesor chiricahuensis Whitfield, 2006
- Pholetesor circumlatus Kotenko, 2007
- Pholetesor circumscriptus (Nees, 1834)
- Pholetesor confusus Liu & Chen, 2016
- Pholetesor dixianus Whitfield, 2006
- Pholetesor dmitriyi Kotenko, 2007
- Pholetesor elpis (Nixon, 1973)
- Pholetesor errans (Nixon, 1973)
- Pholetesor extentus (Papp, 1977)
- Pholetesor flavigleba Liu & Chen, 2016
- Pholetesor flaviparvus Liu & Chen, 2016
- Pholetesor glacialis (Ashmead, 1902)
- Pholetesor hanniae (Valerio & Whitfield, 2003)
- Pholetesor hayati Akhtar, 2010
- Pholetesor ingenuoides (Papp, 1971)
- Pholetesor ingenuus (Tobias, 1964)
- Pholetesor intercedens (Tobias, 1977)
- Pholetesor kuwayamai (Watanabe, 1932)
- Pholetesor laetus (Marshall, 1885)
- Pholetesor lithocolletis Liu & Chen, 2016
- Pholetesor longicoxis Whitfield, 2006
- Pholetesor lyonetiae Liu & Chen, 2016
- Pholetesor maritimus (Wilkinson, 1941)
- Pholetesor masneri (Mason, 1981)
- Pholetesor masoni Whitfield, 2006
- Pholetesor moczari Papp, 2014
- Pholetesor nanus (Reinhard, 1880)
- Pholetesor ornigis (Weed, 1887)
- Pholetesor phaetusa (Nixon, 1973)
- Pholetesor pinifoliellae Whitfield, 2006
- Pholetesor powelli Whitfield, 2006
- Pholetesor pseudocircumscriptus Abdoli, 2019
- Pholetesor rhygoplitoides Whitfield, 2006
- Pholetesor rohweri (Muesebeck, 1921)
- Pholetesor rufulus (Tobias, 1964)
- Pholetesor salalicus (Mason, 1959)
- Pholetesor salicifoliellae (Mason, 1959)
- Pholetesor spinadensus Liu & Chen, 2016
- Pholetesor taiwanensis Liu & Chen, 2016
- Pholetesor teresitergum Liu & Chen, 2016
- Pholetesor terneicus Kotenko, 2007
- Pholetesor thuiellae Whitfield, 2006
- Pholetesor variabilis Whitfield, 2006
- Pholetesor viminetorum (Wesmael, 1837)
- Pholetesor zelleriae Whitfield, 2006
- Pholetesor zherikhini Kotenko, 2007
