= Janhalacaste =

Scientific classification
- Kingdom: Animalia
- Phylum: Arthropoda
- Class: Insecta
- Order: Hymenoptera
- Family: Braconidae
- Subfamily: Microgastrinae
- Genus: Janhalacaste; Fernandez-Triana, 2018

Genus of wasps

Janhalacaste is a genus of wasp in the family Braconidae. There are at least three described species in Janhalacaste, found in Costa Rica.

== Species ==
These three species belong to the genus Janhalacaste:

- Janhalacaste danieli Fernandez-Triana & Boudreault, 2018
- Janhalacaste guanacastensis Fernandez-Triana & Boudreault, 2018
- Janhalacaste winnieae Fernandez-Triana & Boudreault, 2018
