= Neoclarkinella =

Scientific classification
- Kingdom: Animalia
- Phylum: Arthropoda
- Class: Insecta
- Order: Hymenoptera
- Family: Braconidae
- Subfamily: Microgastrinae
- Genus: Neoclarkinella; Rema & Narendran, 1996

Genus of wasps

Neoclarkinella is a genus of wasp in the family Braconidae. There are about seven described species in Neoclarkinella.

== Species ==
These seven species belong to the genus Neoclarkinella:

- Neoclarkinella ariadne (Nixon, 1965) (China, India, Sri Lanka)
- Neoclarkinella curvinervus (Song & Chen, 2014) (China)
- Neoclarkinella janakikkadensis Veena, 2014 (India)
- Neoclarkinella narendrani Veena, 2014 (India)
- Neoclarkinella punctata Ahmad, Pandey, Haider & Shujauddin, 2005 (India)
- Neoclarkinella sundana (Wilkinson, 1930) (Indonesia)
- Neoclarkinella vitellinipes (You & Zhou, 1990) (China, India)
