= Tobleronius =

Scientific classification
- Kingdom: Animalia
- Phylum: Arthropoda
- Class: Insecta
- Order: Hymenoptera
- Family: Braconidae
- Subfamily: Microgastrinae
- Genus: Tobleronius
- Species: T. orientalis

Binomial name
- Tobleronius orientalis Fernandez-Triana & Boudreault, 2018

Genus of wasps

Tobleronius is a genus of wasp in the family Braconidae. There is at least one described species in Tobleronius, T. orientalis, found in Thailand and Vietnam.
