= Paroplitis =

Scientific classification
- Kingdom: Animalia
- Phylum: Arthropoda
- Class: Insecta
- Order: Hymenoptera
- Family: Braconidae
- Subfamily: Microgastrinae
- Genus: Paroplitis; Mason, 1981

Genus of wasps

Paroplitis is a genus of wasp in the family Braconidae. There are about five described species in Paroplitis.

== Species ==
These five species belong to the genus Paroplitis:

- Paroplitis beringianus Mason, 1981 (North America)
- Paroplitis luzonicus Mason, 1981 (Philippines)
- Paroplitis rugosus Papp, 1991 (Austria)
- Paroplitis vietnamensis van Achterberg & Fernández-Triana, 2013 (Vietnam)
- Paroplitis wesmaeli (Ruthe, 1860) (Palearctic)
