= Rhygoplitis =

Scientific classification
- Kingdom: Animalia
- Phylum: Arthropoda
- Class: Insecta
- Order: Hymenoptera
- Family: Braconidae
- Subfamily: Microgastrinae
- Genus: Rhygoplitis; Mason, 1981

Genus of wasps

Rhygoplitis is a genus of wasp in the family Braconidae. There are at least four described species in Rhygoplitis, found in the New World.

== Species ==
These four species belong to the genus Rhygoplitis:

- Rhygoplitis aciculatus (Ashmead, 1900)
- Rhygoplitis choreuti (Viereck, 1912)
- Rhygoplitis sanctivincenti (Ashmead, 1900)
- Rhygoplitis terminalis (Gahan, 1912)
