= Parenion =

Scientific classification
- Kingdom: Animalia
- Phylum: Arthropoda
- Class: Insecta
- Order: Hymenoptera
- Family: Braconidae
- Subfamily: Microgastrinae
- Genus: Parenion; Nixon, 1965

Genus of wasps

Parenion is a genus of wasp in the family Braconidae. There are at least three described species in Parenion, found in Australasia.

== Species ==
These three species belong to the genus Parenion:

- Parenion beelaronga Austin & Dangerfield, 1992 (Australia)
- Parenion bootha Austin & Dangerfield, 1992 (Australia)
- Parenion kokodana (Wilkinson, 1936) (Australia, Papua New Guinea)
