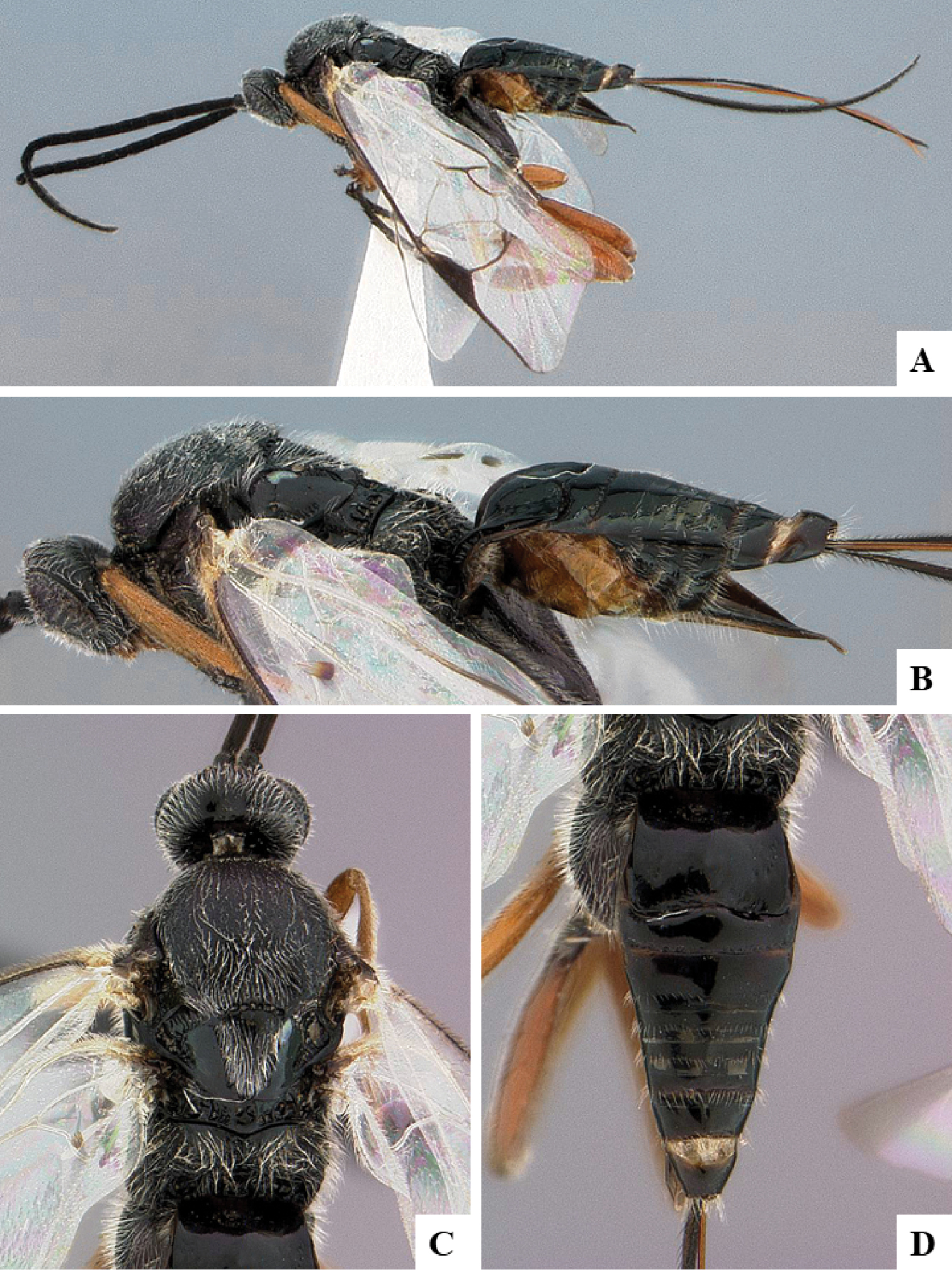
- Dasylagon aegeriae

Scientific classification
- Kingdom: Animalia
- Phylum: Arthropoda
- Class: Insecta
- Order: Hymenoptera
- Family: Braconidae
- Subfamily: Microgastrinae
- Genus: Dasylagon; Muesebeck, 1958

= Dasylagon =

Genus of wasps

Dasylagon is a genus of wasp in the family Braconidae. There are at least two described species in Dasylagon.

== Species ==
These two species belong to the genus Dasylagon:

- Dasylagon aegeriae Muesebeck, 1958 (Colombia)
- Dasylagon simulans Muesebeck, 1958 (Brazil and Honduras)
