= Xanthapanteles =

Scientific classification
- Kingdom: Animalia
- Phylum: Arthropoda
- Class: Insecta
- Order: Hymenoptera
- Family: Braconidae
- Subfamily: Microgastrinae
- Genus: Xanthapanteles; Whitfield, 1995
- Species: X. cameronae

Binomial name
- Xanthapanteles cameronae Whitfield, 1995

Genus of wasps

Xanthapanteles is a genus of wasp in the family Braconidae. There is at least one described species in Xanthapanteles, X. cameronae, found in Argentina.
