= Napamus =

Scientific classification
- Kingdom: Animalia
- Phylum: Arthropoda
- Class: Insecta
- Order: Hymenoptera
- Family: Braconidae
- Subfamily: Microgastrinae
- Genus: Napamus; Papp, 1993

Genus of wasps

Napamus is a genus of wasp in the family Braconidae. There are at least two described species in Napamus, found in the Palearctic. Recently, all the information related to genus was published.

== Species ==
These two species belong to the genus Napamus:

- Napamus vipio (Reinhard, 1880)
- Napamus zomborii Papp, 1993
