= Cuneogaster =

Scientific classification
- Kingdom: Animalia
- Phylum: Arthropoda
- Class: Insecta
- Order: Hymenoptera
- Family: Braconidae
- Subfamily: Microgastrinae
- Genus: Cuneogaster; Choi & Whitfield, 2006
- Species: C. inae

Binomial name
- Cuneogaster inae Choi & Whitfield, 2006

Genus of wasps

Cuneogaster is a genus of wasp in the family Braconidae. There is at least one described species in Cuneogaster, C. inae, found in the Neotropics.
