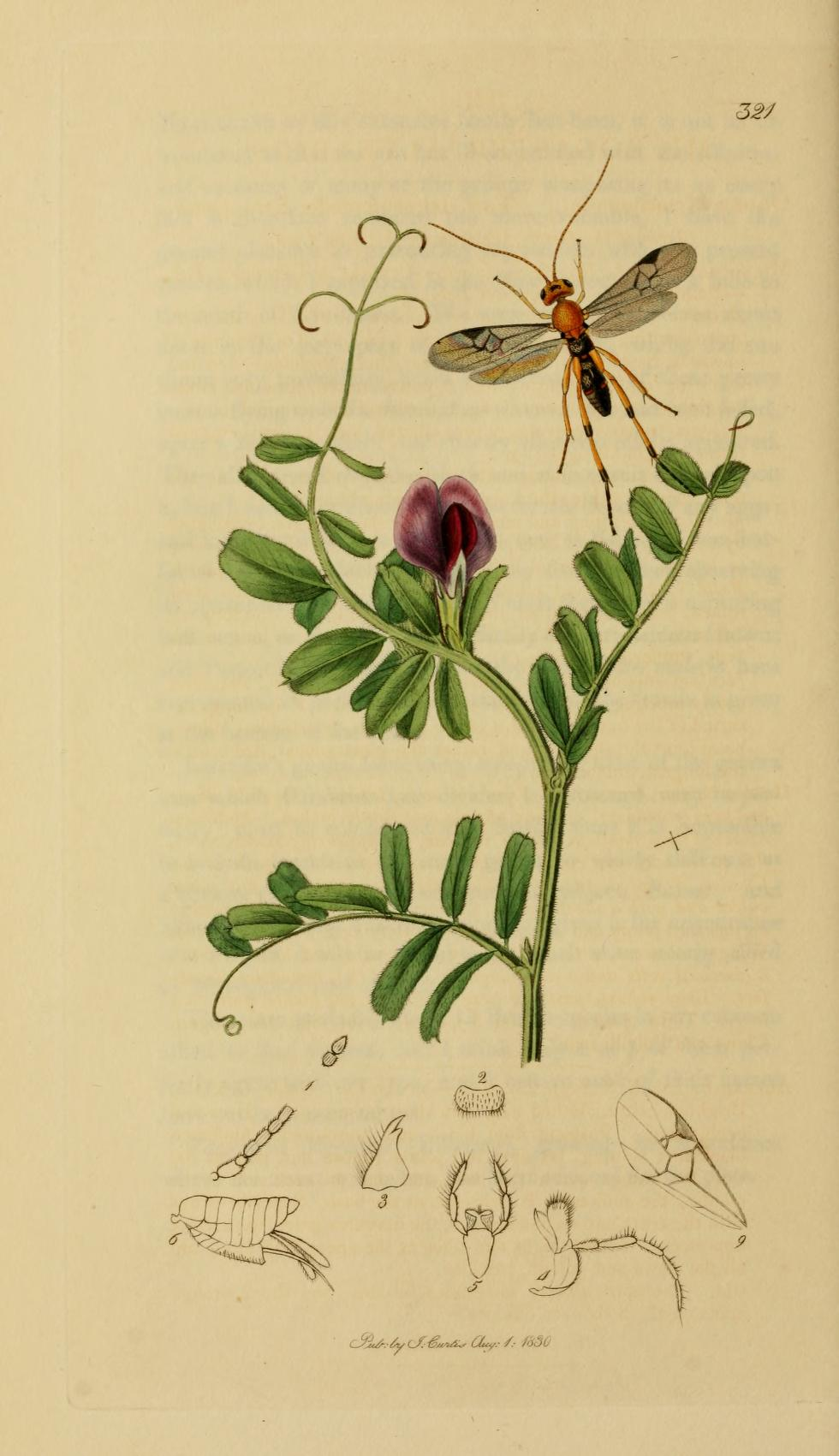

Scientific classification
- Kingdom: Animalia
- Phylum: Arthropoda
- Class: Insecta
- Order: Hymenoptera
- Family: Braconidae
- Subfamily: Microgastrinae
- Genus: Protomicroplitis; Ashmead, 1898

= Protomicroplitis =

Genus of wasps

Protomicroplitis is a genus of wasp in the family Braconidae. There are at least three described species in Protomicroplitis, found in the New World.

== Species ==
These three species belong to the genus Protomicroplitis:

- Protomicroplitis calliptera (Say, 1836)
- Protomicroplitis centroamericanus Fernandez-Triana 2015
- Protomicroplitis mediatus (Cresson, 1865)
