= Distatrix =

Scientific classification
- Kingdom: Animalia
- Phylum: Arthropoda
- Clade: Pancrustacea
- Class: Insecta
- Order: Hymenoptera
- Family: Braconidae
- Subfamily: Microgastrinae
- Genus: Distatrix; Mason, 1981

Genus of wasps

Distatrix is a genus of parasitoid wasps in the family Braconidae. There are more than 30 described species in the genus Distatrix, which are found throughout most of the world.

== Species ==
These 33 species belong to the genus Distatrix:

- Distatrix anthedon (Nixon, 1965)
- Distatrix antirrheae Whitfield & Grinter, 2009
- Distatrix belliger (Wilkinson, 1929)
- Distatrix carolinae Fernández-Triana, 2010
- Distatrix cerales (Nixon, 1965)
- Distatrix cuspidalis (de Saeger, 1944)
- Distatrix euproctidis (Ullyett, 1946)
- Distatrix flava (Fernandez-Triana & van Achterberg, 2017)
- Distatrix formosa (Wesmael, 1837)
- Distatrix geometrivora (de Saeger, 1944)
- Distatrix gratiosa (Wilkinson, 1930)
- Distatrix iglesiasi (Viereck, 1913)
- Distatrix iraklii (Kotenko, 1986)
- Distatrix loretta Grinter, 2009
- Distatrix maia (Nixon, 1965)
- Distatrix malloi (Blanchard, 1942)
- Distatrix pallidocinctus (Gahan, 1918)
- Distatrix pandora Grinter, 2019
- Distatrix papilionis (Viereck, 1912)
- Distatrix pitillaensis Grinter, 2009
- Distatrix pompelon (Nixon, 1965)
- Distatrix sancus (Nixon, 1965)
- Distatrix simulissima (de Saeger, 1944)
- Distatrix solanae Whitfield, 1996
- Distatrix teapae (Nixon, 1965)
- Distatrix tookei (Shenefelt, 1972)
- Distatrix tormina (Nixon, 1965)
- Distatrix ugandaensis (Gahan, 1918)
- Distatrix vigilis Grinter, 2009
- Distatrix xanadon Grinter, 2009
- Distatrix yemenitica van Achterberg & Fernandez-Triana, 2017
- Distatrix yunae Rousse & Gupta, 2013
