= Venanides =

Scientific classification
- Kingdom: Animalia
- Phylum: Arthropoda
- Class: Insecta
- Order: Hymenoptera
- Family: Braconidae
- Subfamily: Microgastrinae
- Genus: Venanides; Mason, 1981

Genus of wasps

Venanides is a genus of wasp in the family Braconidae. There are about 14 described species in Venanides, found throughout much of the world.

== Species ==
These 14 species belong to the genus Venanides:

- Venanides astydamia (Nixon, 1965)
- Venanides caspius Abdoli, Fernandez-Triana & Talebi, 2019
- Venanides congoensis (de Saeger, 1941)
- Venanides curticornis (Granger, 1949)
- Venanides demeter (Wilkinson, 1934)
- Venanides longifrons Fernandez-Triana & van Achterberg, 2017
- Venanides parmula (Nixon, 1965)
- Venanides plancina (Nixon, 1965)
- Venanides pyrogrammae (Nixon, 1965)
- Venanides supracompressus Fernandez-Triana & van Achterberg, 2017
- Venanides symmysta (Nixon, 1965)
- Venanides tenuitergitus Fernandez-Triana & van Achterberg, 2017
- Venanides vanharteni Fernandez-Triana & van Achterberg, 2017
- Venanides xeste Mason, 1981
