= Fornicia =

Scientific classification
- Kingdom: Animalia
- Phylum: Arthropoda
- Class: Insecta
- Order: Hymenoptera
- Family: Braconidae
- Subfamily: Microgastrinae
- Genus: Fornicia; Brullé, 1846

Genus of wasps

Fornicia is a genus of wasp in the family Braconidae. There are more than 30 described species in Fornicia, found mainly in Asia, Africa, and the Neotropics.

== Species ==
These 34 species belong to the genus Fornicia:

- Fornicia achterbergi Yang & Chen, 2006
- Fornicia africana Wilkinson, 1930
- Fornicia afrorum de Saeger, 1942
- Fornicia albalata Ma & Chen, 1994
- Fornicia andamanensis Sharma, 1984
- Fornicia annulipes Ashmead, 1905
- Fornicia arata (Enderlein, 1912)
- Fornicia balloui Muesebeck, 1958
- Fornicia borneana (Cushman, 1929)
- Fornicia brachymetacarpa Luo & You, 2006
- Fornicia ceylonica Wilkinson, 1928
- Fornicia chalcoscelidis Wilkinson, 1936
- Fornicia clathrata Brullé, 1846
- Fornicia ghesquierei de Saeger, 1942
- Fornicia imbecilla Chen & He, 1994
- Fornicia jarmilae Mason, 1981
- Fornicia longiantenna Luo & You, 2008
- Fornicia macistigma Luo & You, 2006
- Fornicia microcephala Granger, 1949
- Fornicia minis He & Chen, 1994
- Fornicia moronis (Cushman, 1929)
- Fornicia muluensis Austin, 1987
- Fornicia obscuripennis Fahringer, 1934
- Fornicia penang (Cushman, 1929)
- Fornicia pilosa Cushman, 1931
- Fornicia prominentis Chen & He, 1994
- Fornicia rixata Papp, 1980
- Fornicia seyrigi Granger, 1949
- Fornicia surinamensis Muesebeck, 1958
- Fornicia tagalog (Cushman, 1929)
- Fornicia tergiversata Papp, 1980
- Fornicia thoseae Wilkinson, 1930
