= Illidops =

Scientific classification
- Kingdom: Animalia
- Phylum: Arthropoda
- Class: Insecta
- Order: Hymenoptera
- Family: Braconidae
- Subfamily: Microgastrinae
- Genus: Illidops; Mason, 1981

Genus of wasps

Illidops is a genus of wasp in the family Braconidae. There are more than 30 described species in Illidops, found throughout most of the world.

== Species ==
These 37 species belong to the genus Illidops:

- Illidops albostigmalis van Achterberg & Fernández-Triana, 2017
- Illidops aridus Penteado-Dias & Scatolini, 2000
- Illidops assimilis (Papp, 1976)
- Illidops azamgarhensis (Ahmad, 2005)
- Illidops barcinonensis (Marshall, 1898)
- Illidops bellicosus (Papp, 1977)
- Illidops blandus (Tobias & Kotenko, 1986)
- Illidops butalidis (Marshall, 1889)
- Illidops buteonis (Kotenko, 1986)
- Illidops cloelia (Nixon, 1965)
- Illidops dauricus Kotenko, 2007
- Illidops electilis (Tobias, 1964)
- Illidops keralensis (Narendran & Sumodan, 1992)
- Illidops kostjuki (Kotenko, 1986)
- Illidops kostylevi (Kotenko, 1986)
- Illidops lamprosemae (Ahmad, 2005)
- Illidops mutabilis (Telenga, 1955)
- Illidops naso (Marshall, 1885)
- Illidops nigritegula (Tobias & Kotenko, 1986)
- Illidops paranaensis Penteado-Dias & Scatolini, 2000
- Illidops perseveratus (Papp, 1977)
- Illidops planiscapus (Tobias, 1976)
- Illidops rostratus (Tobias, 1976)
- Illidops scutellaris (Muesebeck, 1921)
- Illidops sophrosine (Nixon, 1976)
- Illidops splendidus (Papp, 1974)
- Illidops subversor (Tobias & Kotenko, 1986)
- Illidops suevus (Reinhard, 1880)
- Illidops suffectus (Tobias & Kotenko, 1986)
- Illidops terrestris Wharton, 1983
- Illidops tigris (Kotenko, 1986)
- Illidops toreicus Kotenko, 2007
- Illidops trabea (Nixon, 1965)
- Illidops urgens Kotenko, 2004
- Illidops urgo (Nixon, 1965)
- Illidops uvidus Penteado-Dias & Scatolini, 2000
- Illidops vitobiasi Kotenko, 2004
