= Deuterixys =

Scientific classification
- Kingdom: Animalia
- Phylum: Arthropoda
- Class: Insecta
- Order: Hymenoptera
- Family: Braconidae
- Subfamily: Microgastrinae
- Genus: Deuterixys; Mason, 1981

Genus of wasps

Deuterixys is a genus of wasp in the family Braconidae. There are about 18 described species in Deuterixys, found throughout most of the world.

== Species ==
These 18 species belong to the genus Deuterixys:

- Deuterixys anica Austin & Dangerfield, 1992
- Deuterixys bennetti Whitfield, 1985
- Deuterixys bifossalis Zeng & Chen, 2011
- Deuterixys carbonaria (Wesmael, 1837)
- Deuterixys colombiana Whitfield & Oltra, 2005
- Deuterixys condarensis (Tobias, 1960)
- Deuterixys curticalcar Zeng & Chen, 2011
- Deuterixys erythrocephala Whitfield & Oltra, 2005
- Deuterixys hansoni Whitfield & Oltra, 2005
- Deuterixys pacifica Whitfield, 1985
- Deuterixys patro (Nixon, 1965)
- Deuterixys plugarui (Tobias, 1975)
- Deuterixys quercicola Whitfield, 1985
- Deuterixys rimulosa (Niezabitowski, 1910)
- Deuterixys svetlanae Kotenko, 2007
- Deuterixys tehuantepeca Whitfield & Oltra, 2005
- Deuterixys tenuiconvergens Zargar & Gupta, 2019
- Deuterixys x-formis Papp, 2012
