= Rasivalva =

Scientific classification
- Kingdom: Animalia
- Phylum: Arthropoda
- Class: Insecta
- Order: Hymenoptera
- Family: Braconidae
- Subfamily: Microgastrinae
- Genus: Rasivalva; Mason, 1981

Genus of wasps

Rasivalva is a genus of wasp in the family Braconidae. There are about 12 described species in Rasivalva. They are found mainly in the Holarctic, although one species is found in Africa.

== Species ==
These 12 species belong to the genus Rasivalva:

- Rasivalva calceata (Haliday, 1834)
- Rasivalva circumvecta (Lyle, 1918)
- Rasivalva desueta Papp, 1989
- Rasivalva karadagi Tobias, 1986
- Rasivalva leleji Kotenko, 2007
- Rasivalva lepelleyi (Wilkinson, 1934)
- Rasivalva longivena Song & Chen, 2004
- Rasivalva marginata (Nees, 1834)
- Rasivalva perplexa (Muesebeck, 1922)
- Rasivalva pyrenaica Oltra & Jiménez, 2005
- Rasivalva rugosa (Muesebeck, 1922)
- Rasivalva stigmatica (Muesebeck, 1922)
