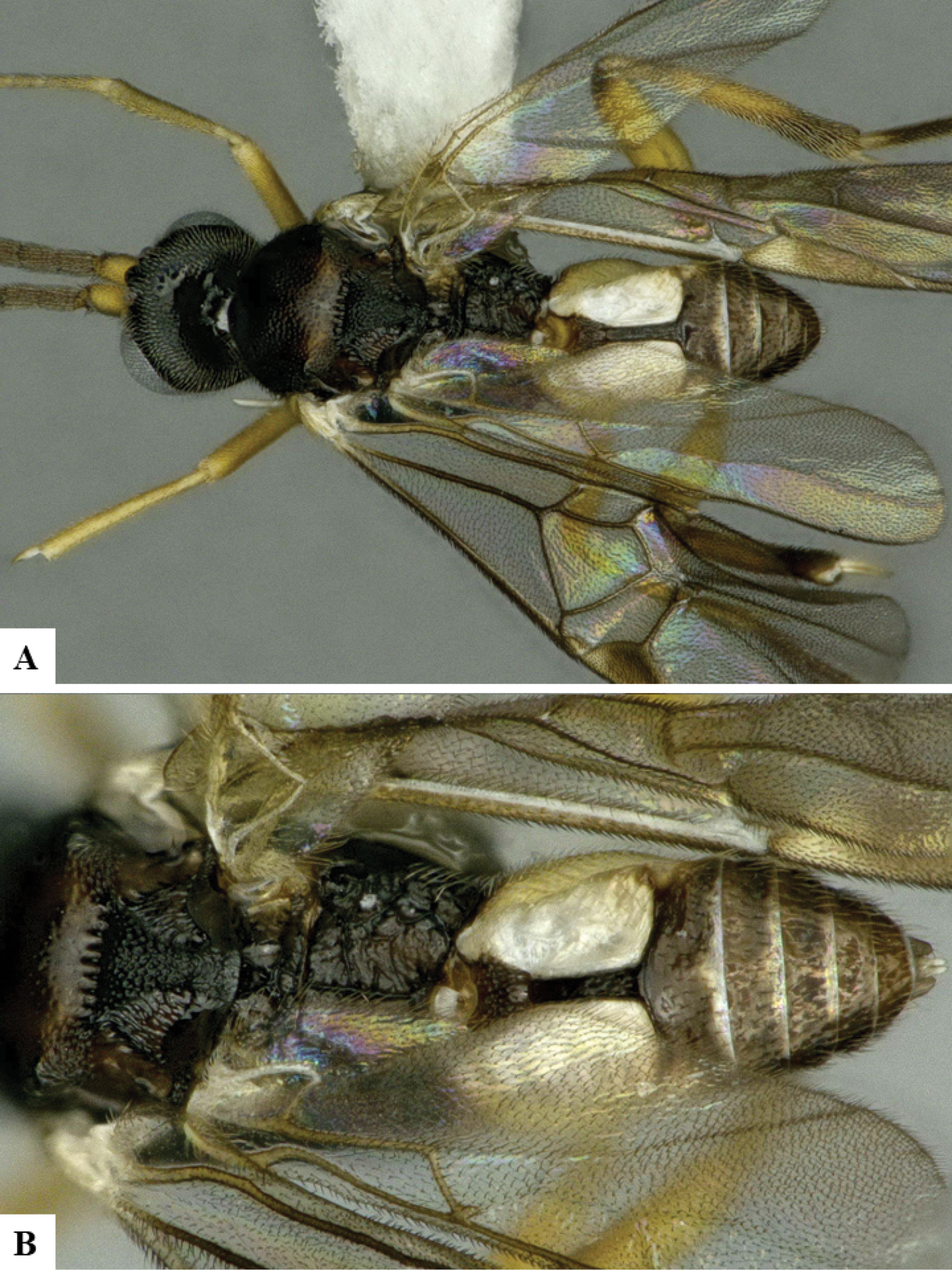

Scientific classification
- Kingdom: Animalia
- Phylum: Arthropoda
- Class: Insecta
- Order: Hymenoptera
- Family: Braconidae
- Subfamily: Microgastrinae
- Genus: Zachterbergius
- Species: Z. tenuitergum

Binomial name
- Zachterbergius tenuitergum Fernandez-Triana & Boudreault, 2018

= Zachterbergius =

Genus of wasps

Zachterbergius is a genus of wasp in the family Braconidae. There is at least one described species in Zachterbergius, Z. tenuitergum, found in Thailand.
