= Ohenri =

Scientific classification
- Kingdom: Animalia
- Phylum: Arthropoda
- Class: Insecta
- Order: Hymenoptera
- Family: Braconidae
- Subfamily: Microgastrinae
- Genus: Ohenri
- Species: O. gouletorum

Binomial name
- Ohenri gouletorum Fernandez-Triana & Boudreault, 2018

Genus of wasps

Ohenri is a genus of wasp in the family Braconidae. There is at least one described species in Ohenri, O. gouletorum, found in Nigeria.

The name honours Dr Henri Goulet.
