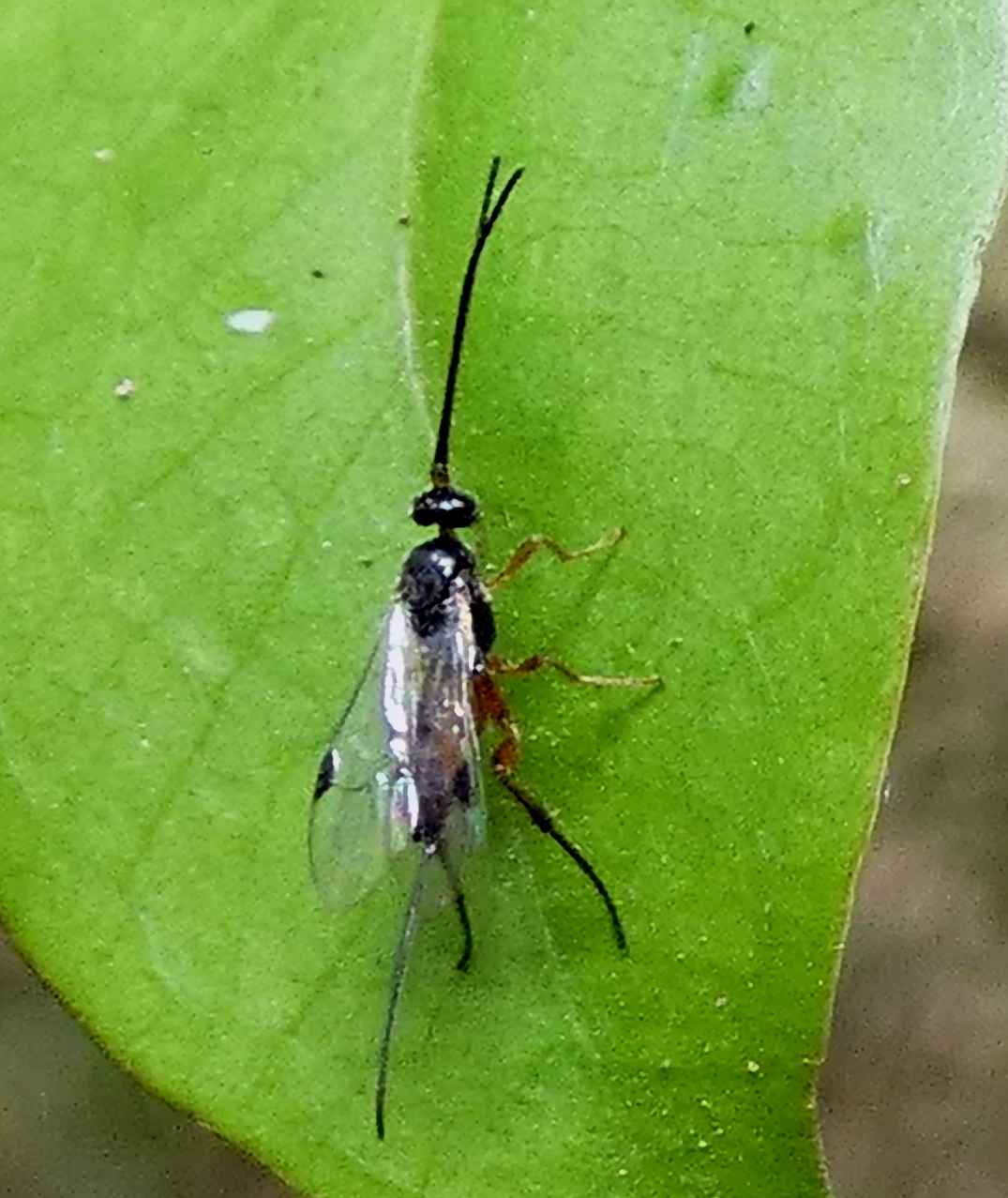

Scientific classification
- Kingdom: Animalia
- Phylum: Arthropoda
- Class: Insecta
- Order: Hymenoptera
- Family: Braconidae
- Subfamily: Microgastrinae
- Genus: Promicrogaster; Brues & Richardson, 1913

= Promicrogaster =

Genus of wasps

Promicrogaster is a genus of wasp in the family Braconidae. There are more than 40 described species in Promicrogaster, found throughout most of the world.

== Species ==
These 46 species belong to the genus Promicrogaster:

- Promicrogaster alexmartinezi Fernandez-Triana & Boudreault, 2016
- Promicrogaster andreyvallejosi Fernandez-Triana & Boudreault, 2016
- Promicrogaster apharea Nixon, 1965
- Promicrogaster apidanus (Nixon, 1965)
- Promicrogaster brandondinartei Fernandez-Triana & Boudreault, 2016
- Promicrogaster briareus (Nixon, 1965)
- Promicrogaster cara Nixon, 1965
- Promicrogaster conopiae (Watanabe, 1934)
- Promicrogaster daniellopezi Fernandez-Triana & Boudreault, 2016
- Promicrogaster daretrizoi Fernandez-Triana & Boudreault, 2016
- Promicrogaster eddycastroi Fernandez-Triana & Boudreault, 2016
- Promicrogaster eimyobandoae Fernandez-Triana & Boudreault, 2016
- Promicrogaster emesa (Nixon, 1965)
- Promicrogaster erigone Nixon, 1965
- Promicrogaster fabiancastroi Fernandez-Triana & Boudreault, 2016
- Promicrogaster fabriciocambroneroi Fernandez-Triana & Boudreault, 2016
- Promicrogaster floridakeys Fernandez-Triana, 2019
- Promicrogaster gainesvillensis Fernandez-Triana, 2019
- Promicrogaster grandicula (Wilkinson, 1929)
- Promicrogaster hillaryvillafuerteae Fernandez-Triana & Boudreault, 2016
- Promicrogaster huachuca Fernandez-Triana, 2019
- Promicrogaster jaymeae Fernandez-Triana, 2019
- Promicrogaster kevinmartinezi Fernandez-Triana & Boudreault, 2016
- Promicrogaster kiralycastilloae Fernandez-Triana & Boudreault, 2016
- Promicrogaster leilycastilloae Fernandez-Triana & Boudreault, 2016
- Promicrogaster liagrantae Fernandez-Triana & Boudreault, 2016
- Promicrogaster luismendezi Fernandez-Triana & Boudreault, 2016
- Promicrogaster madreanensis Fernandez-Triana, 2019
- Promicrogaster merella Nixon, 1965
- Promicrogaster miranda Muesebeck, 1958
- Promicrogaster monteverdensis Fernandez-Triana & Boudreault, 2016
- Promicrogaster munda Muesebeck, 1958
- Promicrogaster naomiduarteae Fernandez-Triana & Boudreault, 2016
- Promicrogaster orsedice (Nixon, 1965)
- Promicrogaster polyporicola Muesebeck, 1958
- Promicrogaster prater Nixon, 1965
- Promicrogaster repleta (Papp, 1990)
- Promicrogaster rondeau Fernandez-Triana, 2019
- Promicrogaster ronycastilloi Fernandez-Triana & Boudreault, 2016
- Promicrogaster sebastiancambroneroi Fernandez-Triana & Boudreault, 2016
- Promicrogaster spilopterus Nixon, 1965
- Promicrogaster sterope Nixon, 1965
- Promicrogaster terebrator Brues & Richardson, 1913
- Promicrogaster tracyvindasae Fernandez-Triana & Boudreault, 2016
- Promicrogaster typhon (Nixon, 1965)
- Promicrogaster virginiana Fernandez-Triana, 2019
