= Larissimus =

Scientific classification
- Kingdom: Animalia
- Phylum: Arthropoda
- Class: Insecta
- Order: Hymenoptera
- Family: Braconidae
- Subfamily: Microgastrinae
- Genus: Larissimus; Nixon, 1965
- Species: L. cassander

Binomial name
- Larissimus cassander Nixon, 1965

Genus of wasps

Larissimus is a genus of wasp in the family Braconidae. There is at least one described species in Larissimus, L. cassander, found in Brazil.
