= Beyarslania =

Scientific classification
- Kingdom: Animalia
- Phylum: Arthropoda
- Class: Insecta
- Order: Hymenoptera
- Family: Braconidae
- Subfamily: Microgastrinae
- Genus: Beyarslania; Koçak & Kemal, 2009
- Species: B. insolens

Binomial name
- Beyarslania insolens (Wilkinson, 1930)

Genus of wasps

Beyarslania is a genus of wasp in the family Braconidae. There is at least one described species in Beyarslania, B. insolens, found in Africa.
