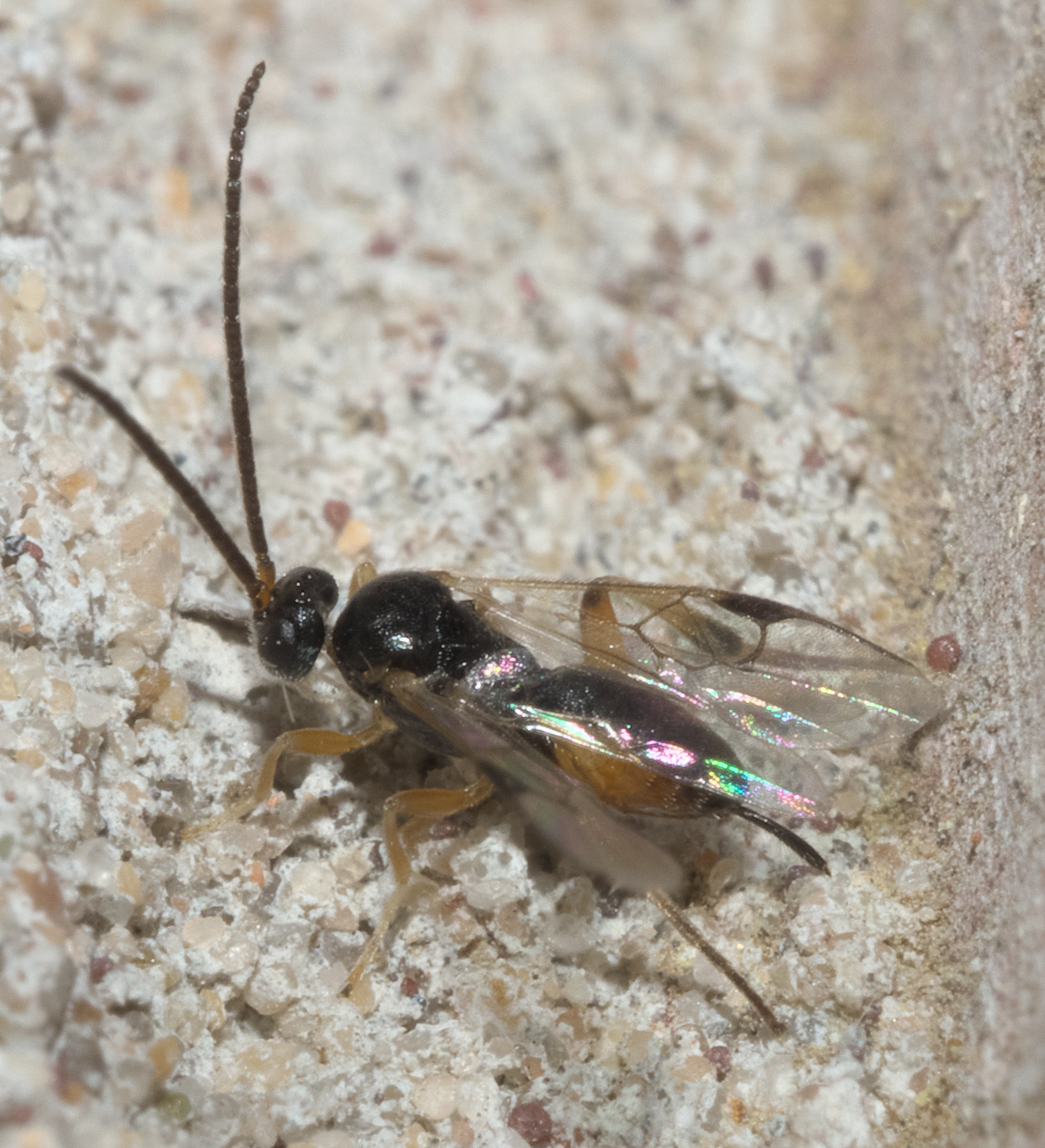
- Hypomicrogaster

Scientific classification
- Kingdom: Animalia
- Phylum: Arthropoda
- Class: Insecta
- Order: Hymenoptera
- Family: Braconidae
- Subfamily: Microgastrinae
- Genus: Hypomicrogaster; Ashmead, 1898

= Hypomicrogaster =

Genus of wasps

Hypomicrogaster is a genus of wasp in the family Braconidae. There are more than 40 described species in Hypomicrogaster, found in North, Central, and South America.

== Species ==
These 48 species belong to the genus Hypomicrogaster:

- Hypomicrogaster acarnas Nixon, 1965
- Hypomicrogaster aodoa Valerio, 2015
- Hypomicrogaster aplebis Valerio, 2015
- Hypomicrogaster areolaris (Blanchard, 1947)
- Hypomicrogaster cernus Valerio, 2015
- Hypomicrogaster crocina Valerio, 2015
- Hypomicrogaster daktulios Valerio, 2015
- Hypomicrogaster deltis Valerio, 2015
- Hypomicrogaster duo Valerio, 2015
- Hypomicrogaster ecus Nixon, 1965
- Hypomicrogaster epipagis Valerio, 2015
- Hypomicrogaster espera Valerio, 2015
- Hypomicrogaster evrys Valerio, 2015
- Hypomicrogaster guille Valerio, 2015
- Hypomicrogaster hektos Valerio, 2015
- Hypomicrogaster hupsos Valerio, 2015
- Hypomicrogaster imitator (Ashmead, 1900)
- Hypomicrogaster ingensis Valerio, 2015
- Hypomicrogaster insolita Valerio, 2015
- Hypomicrogaster inversalis Valerio, 2015
- Hypomicrogaster koinos Valerio, 2015
- Hypomicrogaster larga Valerio, 2015
- Hypomicrogaster laxa Valerio & Mason, 2015
- Hypomicrogaster linearis Valerio, 2015
- Hypomicrogaster lineata Valerio, 2015
- Hypomicrogaster luisi Valerio, 2015
- Hypomicrogaster masoni Valerio, 2015
- Hypomicrogaster mesos Valerio, 2015
- Hypomicrogaster mikrosus Valerio, 2015
- Hypomicrogaster multa Valerio, 2015
- Hypomicrogaster pablouzagai (Fernandez-Triana & Boudreault, 2016)
- Hypomicrogaster pectinata Valerio, 2015
- Hypomicrogaster plagios Valerio, 2015
- Hypomicrogaster pollex Valerio, 2015
- Hypomicrogaster rugosa Valerio, 2015
- Hypomicrogaster samarshalli (Fernández-Triana, 2010)
- Hypomicrogaster scindus Valerio, 2015
- Hypomicrogaster sicingens Valerio, 2015
- Hypomicrogaster sicpollex Valerio, 2015
- Hypomicrogaster sicscindus Valerio, 2015
- Hypomicrogaster siderion Valerio, 2015
- Hypomicrogaster spatulae Valerio, 2015
- Hypomicrogaster specialis Valerio, 2015
- Hypomicrogaster tantilla Valerio, 2015
- Hypomicrogaster tetra Valerio, 2015
- Hypomicrogaster tydeus Nixon, 1965
- Hypomicrogaster zan Valerio, 2015
- Hypomicrogaster zonaria (Say, 1836)
