= Eripnopelta =

Scientific classification
- Kingdom: Animalia
- Phylum: Arthropoda
- Class: Insecta
- Order: Hymenoptera
- Family: Braconidae
- Subfamily: Microgastrinae
- Genus: Eripnopelta; Chen, 2017
- Species: E. ithyvena

Binomial name
- Eripnopelta ithyvena Xiong, van Achterberg & Chen, 2017

Genus of wasps

Eripnopelta is a genus of wasp in the family Braconidae. There is at least one described species in Eripnopelta, E. ithyvena, found in China.
