= Snellenius =

Scientific classification
- Kingdom: Animalia
- Phylum: Arthropoda
- Class: Insecta
- Order: Hymenoptera
- Family: Braconidae
- Subfamily: Microgastrinae
- Genus: Snellenius; Westwood 1882

Genus of wasps

Snellenius is a genus of wasp in the family Braconidae. There are more than 40 described species in Snellenius, found in Asia, Oceania, and the Neotropics.

== Species ==
These 42 species belong to the genus Snellenius:

- Snellenius atratus Shenefelt, 1968
- Snellenius basalis (Walker, 1874)
- Snellenius bicolor Shenefelt, 1968
- Snellenius billburgeri Fernandez-Triana & Whitfield, 2015
- Snellenius bobdressleri Fernandez-Triana & Whitfield, 2015
- Snellenius clavitergum Austin & Dangerfield, 1993
- Snellenius donstonei Fernandez-Triana & Whitfield, 2015
- Snellenius felipechavarriai Fernandez-Triana & Whitfield, 2015
- Snellenius gelleus Nixon, 1965
- Snellenius gerardoherrerai Fernandez-Triana & Whitfield, 2015
- Snellenius guizhouensis Luo & You, 2005
- Snellenius hippotionus Austin & Dangerfield, 1993
- Snellenius irenebakerae Fernandez-Triana & Whitfield, 2015
- Snellenius isidrochaconi Fernandez-Triana & Whitfield, 2015
- Snellenius johnkressi Fernandez-Triana & Whitfield, 2015
- Snellenius jorgecampabadali Fernandez-Triana & Whitfield, 2015
- Snellenius jorgegomezlauritoi Fernandez-Triana & Whitfield, 2015
- Snellenius josesarukhani Fernandez-Triana & Whitfield, 2015
- Snellenius kerrydresslerae Fernandez-Triana & Whitfield, 2015
- Snellenius latigenus Luo & You, 2005
- Snellenius lucindamcdadeae Fernandez-Triana & Whitfield, 2015
- Snellenius luisdiegogomezi Fernandez-Triana & Whitfield, 2015
- Snellenius maculipennis (Szépligeti, 1900)
- Snellenius mariakuzminae Fernandez-Triana & Whitfield, 2015
- Snellenius mariamartachavarriae Fernandez-Triana & Whitfield, 2015
- Snellenius nigellus Long & van Achterberg, 2013
- Snellenius peruensis Shenefelt, 1968
- Snellenius phildevriesi Fernandez-Triana & Whitfield, 2015
- Snellenius philippinensis (Ashmead, 1904)
- Snellenius quiricojimenezi Fernandez-Triana & Whitfield, 2015
- Snellenius radicalis (Wilkinson, 1929)
- Snellenius robertoespinozai Fernandez-Triana & Whitfield, 2015
- Snellenius sandyknappae Fernandez-Triana & Whitfield, 2015
- Snellenius sedlaceki Austin & Dangerfield, 1993
- Snellenius similis Long & van Achterberg, 2013
- Snellenius theretrae (Watanabe, 1937)
- Snellenius tricolor Shenefelt, 1968
- Snellenius velvaruddae Fernandez-Triana & Whitfield, 2015
- Snellenius vickifunkae Fernandez-Triana & Whitfield, 2015
- Snellenius vollenhovii Westwood, 1882
- Snellenius warrenwagneri Fernandez-Triana & Whitfield, 2015
- † Snellenius succinalis Brues, 1933
