= Sathon (wasp) =

Scientific classification
- Kingdom: Animalia
- Phylum: Arthropoda
- Class: Insecta
- Order: Hymenoptera
- Family: Braconidae
- Subfamily: Microgastrinae
- Genus: Sathon; Mason, 1981

Genus of wasps

Sathon is a genus of wasp in the family Braconidae. There are more than 20 described species in Sathon, found throughout the world.

== Species ==
These 23 species belong to the genus Sathon:

- Sathon aggeris Williams, 1988
- Sathon albicoxus Austin & Dangerfield, 1992
- Sathon bekilyensis (Granger, 1949)
- Sathon belippae (Rohwer, 1919)
- Sathon cinctiformis (Viereck, 1911)
- Sathon circumflexus Williams, 1988
- Sathon eugeni (Papp, 1972)
- Sathon falcatus (Nees, 1834)
- Sathon fausta (Nixon, 1973)
- Sathon flavofacialis (Granger, 1949)
- Sathon laevidorsum Williams, 1988
- Sathon lateralis (Haliday, 1834)
- Sathon laurae (de Saeger, 1944)
- Sathon masoni Williams, 1988
- Sathon mikeno (de Saeger, 1944)
- Sathon morata (Wilkinson, 1929)
- Sathon naryciae Austin & Dangerfield, 1992
- Sathon neomexicanus (Muesebeck, 1921)
- Sathon oreo Fagan-Jeffries & Austin, 2019
- Sathon papilionae Williams, 1988
- Sathon resplendens (Wilkinson, 1929)
- Sathon ruandanus (de Saeger, 1944)
- Sathon rufotestaceus (Granger, 1949)
