= G. E. J. Nixon =

Gilbert Edward James Nixon (2 March 1905 – 22 August 1987) was an entomologist who specialized in the hymenoptera, particularly the Proctotrupoidea and Braconidae. He worked at the Imperial Bureau of Entomology which later became the Commonwealth Agricultural Bureau and later at the British Museum (Natural History). The genus Gilbertnixonius is named in his honour.

== Life and work ==
Nixon joined the British Museum as a temporary assistant at the age of nineteen and became interested in the hymenoptera. He then became interested in the parasitic forms and specialized in the Proctotrupoidea which led to his being recruited into the Imperial Bureau of Entomology as a permanent staff. He worked here until his retirement. The institution later became known as the Commonweal Agricultural Bureau, International Institute of Entomology. After his retirement in 1970 he worked at the Natural History Museum in an honorary position. He published more than 90 research papers. He was interested more in taxonomic identification and had little interest in phylogenetics and evolution. He wrote on the behaviour of aculeate wasps and bees in addition to his taxonomic work.
