= Ichiro Suzuki =

Japanese baseball player (born 1973)

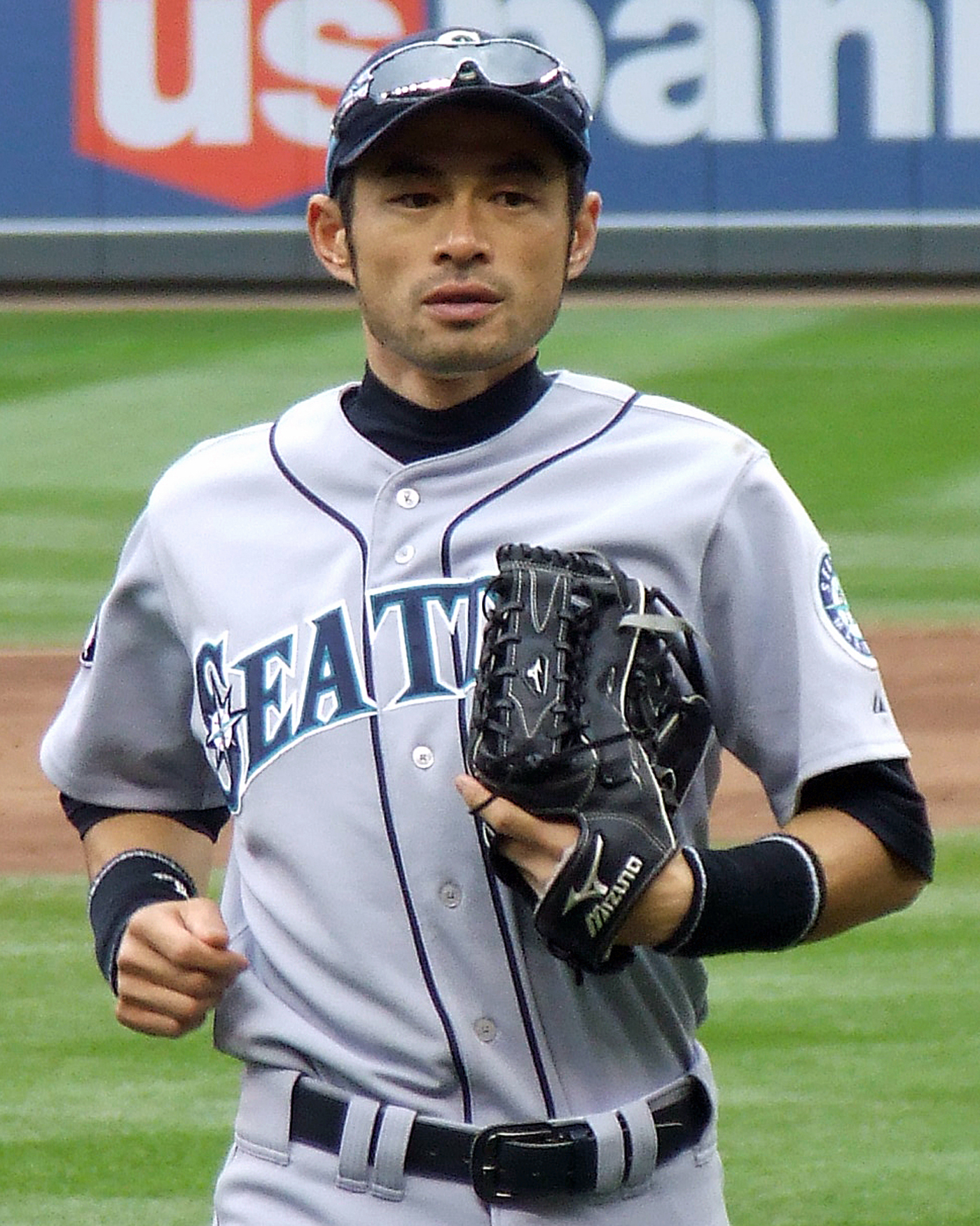
- Suzuki with the Seattle Mariners in 2011
- Right fielder
- Born: October 22, 1973 (age 53); Nishikasugai-gun, Aichi, Japan
- Batted: Left Threw: Right

Professional debut
- NPB: July 11, 1992, for the Orix BlueWave
- MLB: April 2, 2001, for the Seattle Mariners

Last appearance
- NPB: October 13, 2000, for the Orix BlueWave
- MLB: March 21, 2019, for the Seattle Mariners

NPB statistics
- Batting average: .353
- Hits: 1,278
- Home runs: 118
- Runs batted in: 529
- Stolen bases: 199

MLB statistics
- Batting average: .311
- Hits: 3,089
- Home runs: 117
- Runs batted in: 780
- Stolen bases: 509
- Stats at Baseball Reference

Teams
- Orix BlueWave (1992–2000); Seattle Mariners (2001–2012); New York Yankees (2012–2014); Miami Marlins (2015–2017); Seattle Mariners (2018–2019)

Career highlights and awards
- NPB: 7× All-Star (1994–2000); Japan Series champion (1996); 3× Pacific League MVP (1994–1996); 7× Golden Glove Award (1994–2000); 7× Best Nine Award (1994–2000); 2× Matsutaro Shoriki Award (1994, 1995); 7× Pacific League batting champion (1994–2000); Pacific League RBI leader (1995); Pacific League stolen base leader (1995); Japanese Baseball Hall of Fame; MLB: 10× All-Star (2001–2010); AL MVP (2001); AL Rookie of the Year (2001); 10× Gold Glove Award (2001–2010); 3× Silver Slugger Award (2001, 2007, 2009); 2× AL batting champion (2001, 2004); AL stolen base leader (2001); MLB record 262 hits, single season; Commissioner's Historic Achievement Award; Seattle Mariners No. 51 retired; Seattle Mariners Hall of Fame

Member of the National

Baseball Hall of Fame
- Induction: 2025
- Vote: 99.7% (first ballot)
Medals
Men's baseball
Representing Japan
World Baseball Classic
Gold medal – first place	2006 San Diego	Team
Gold medal – first place	2009 Los Angeles	Team

Ichiro Suzuki (/ˈiːtʃɪroʊ/ EE-chirr-oh; Japanese: 鈴木 一朗, romanized: Suzuki Ichirō, IPA: [sɯzɯki itɕiɾoː]; born October 22, 1973), also known mononymously as Ichiro (イチロー, Ichirō), is a Japanese former professional baseball outfielder who played for 28 seasons. He played the first nine years of his career with the Orix BlueWave of Nippon Professional Baseball (NPB) and the next 12 years with the Seattle Mariners of Major League Baseball (MLB). Suzuki then played two and a half seasons with the New York Yankees and three with the Miami Marlins before returning to the Mariners for his final two seasons. He won two World Baseball Classic titles with the Japan national team. One of the greatest contact hitters, leadoff hitters, and defensive outfielders in baseball history, he is also considered one of the greatest baseball players of all time.

In his combined playing time in the NPB and MLB, Suzuki received 17 consecutive selections as an All-Star and Gold Glove winner, won nine league batting titles, and was named his league's most valuable player (MVP) four times. In NPB, he won seven consecutive batting titles and three consecutive Pacific League MVP Awards. In 2001, Suzuki became the first Japanese-born position player to be posted and signed to an MLB club. He led the American League (AL) in batting average and stolen bases en route to being named AL Rookie of the Year and AL MVP.

Suzuki was the first MLB player to enter the Meikyukai (The Golden Players Club). He was a ten-time MLB All-Star and won the 2007 All-Star Game MVP Award for a three-hit performance that included the event's first-ever inside-the-park home run. Suzuki won a Gold Glove Award in each of his first 10 years in the majors and had an AL-record seven hitting streaks of 20 or more games, with a high of 27. He was also noted for the longevity of his career, continuing to produce at a high level with an on-base percentage above .300 in 2016, while approaching 43 years of age. Suzuki also set a number of batting records, including MLB's single-season record for hits with 262. He had 10 consecutive 200-hit seasons, the longest streak by any player in MLB history. In 2016, Suzuki notched the 3,000th hit of his MLB career, becoming the 30th player ever to do so. In total, he finished with 4,367 hits in his professional career across Japan and the United States, the most of any player in history at the top level of baseball. Since retiring as a player in 2019, he became the Mariners' special assistant to the chairman.

In 2025, Suzuki was elected to the National Baseball Hall of Fame in his first year of eligibility. He became the first Japanese player and first Asian-born player to be elected into the Hall of Fame, receiving 99.7% of the vote, tied with Derek Jeter for the second-highest percentage ever. That same year, Suzuki was also elected to the Japanese Baseball Hall of Fame. That August, the Mariners retired Suzuki's number 51.

== Early life ==
Ichiro was born in Nishikasugai-gun, Aichi, and grew up in Toyoyama, a small town just outside Nagoya. At the age of seven, Suzuki joined his first baseball team and asked his father, Nobuyuki Suzuki (鈴木宣之), to teach him to be a better player. The two began a daily routine, which included throwing 50 pitches, fielding 50 infield balls and 50 outfield balls, and hitting 500 pitches, 250 from a pitching machine and 250 from his father.

As a little leaguer in Toyoyama, Suzuki had the word "concentration" (集中, shūchū) written on his glove. By age 12, he had dedicated himself to pursuing a career in professional baseball, and their training sessions were no longer for leisure, and less enjoyable. The elder Suzuki claimed, "Baseball was fun for both of us," but Ichiro later said, "It might have been fun for him, but for me it was a lot like Star of the Giants," a popular Japanese manga and anime series about a young baseball prospect's difficult road to success, with rigorous training demanded by the father. According to Ichiro, "It bordered on hazing and I suffered a lot."

When Suzuki joined his high-school baseball team, his father told the coach, "No matter how good Ichiro is, don't ever praise him. We have to make him spiritually strong." When he was ready to enter high school, Suzuki was selected by a school with a prestigious baseball program, Nagoya's Aikodai Meiden High School. Suzuki was primarily used as a pitcher instead of as an outfielder, owing to his exceptionally strong arm. His cumulative high-school batting average was .505, with 19 home runs. He had known Hideki Matsui (then at Seiryo High School in Ishikawa, one grade below him) through practice matches since that time.

He built strength and stamina by hurling car tires and hitting Wiffle balls with a heavy shovel, among other regimens. These exercises helped develop his wrists and hips, adding power and endurance to his thin frame. Despite his outstanding numbers in high school, Suzuki was not drafted until the fourth round of the NPB draft in November 1991, because many teams were discouraged by his small size of 5 ft 9 1/2 in (177 cm) and 124 pounds (56 kg). Years later, Suzuki told an interviewer, "I'm not a big guy, and hopefully kids could look at me and see that I'm not muscular and not physically imposing, that I'm just a regular guy. So if somebody with a regular body can get into the record books, kids can look at that. That would make me happy."

== Professional career ==
=== Orix BlueWave (1992–2000) ===
Suzuki made his NPB Pacific League debut in 1992 for the Orix BlueWave at the age of 18, but he spent most of his first two seasons in the farm system (accumulating 156 minor league hits and a .368 batting average) because his then-manager, Shōzō Doi, refused to accept Suzuki's unorthodox swing. The swing was nicknamed 'pendulum' (振り子打法, Furiko Dahō) because of the pendulum-like motion of his leg, which shifts his weight forward as he swings the bat, and goes against conventional hitting theory. In his second career game, he recorded his first ichi-gun (Japan's Nippon Professional Baseball League) hit in the Pacific League against Fukuoka Daiei Hawks pitcher Keiji Kimura. Despite hitting a home run in 1993 against Hideo Nomo, who later won the National League (NL) Rookie of the Year Award, Suzuki was nevertheless sent back to the farm system on the same day.

In 1994, he benefited from the arrival of a new manager, Akira Ōgi, who played him every day in the second spot of the lineup. He was eventually moved to the leadoff spot, where his immediate productivity dissolved any misgivings about his unconventional swing. He set the NPB single-season record with 210 hits, the first player ever to top 200 hits in a single season. Five other players have since done so: Matt Murton, Nori Aoki (twice), Alex Ramírez, Tsuyoshi Nishioka, and Shogo Akiyama.

Suzuki's .385 batting average in 1994 was a Pacific League record and won the young outfielder the first of a record seven consecutive batting titles. Suzuki also hit 13 home runs and had 29 stolen bases, helping him to earn his first of three straight Pacific League Most Valuable Player (MVP) awards. During the 1994 season, he began to use his given name, "Ichiro," instead of his family name, "Suzuki," on the back of his uniform. Suzuki is the second-most-common family name in Japan, and his manager introduced the idea as a publicity move to help create a new image for what had been a relatively weak team, as well as a way to distinguish their rising star. Initially, Suzuki disliked the practice and was embarrassed by it; however, "Ichiro" was a household name by the end of the season, and he was flooded with endorsement offers.

In 1995, Suzuki led the Blue Wave to its first Pacific League pennant in 12 years. In addition to his second batting title, he led the league with 80 RBI and 49 stolen bases, while his career-high 25 home runs were third in the league. By this time, the Japanese press had begun calling him the "Hit Manufacturing Machine" (安打製造機, Anda Seizōki). The following year, with Suzuki winning his third-straight MVP award, the team defeated the Central League champion Yomiuri Giants in the Japan Series. Following the 1996 season, playing in an exhibition series against a visiting team of Major League Baseball (MLB) All-Stars kindled Suzuki's desire to travel to the United States to play in MLB.

In November 1998, Suzuki participated in a seven-game exhibition series between Japanese and American all-stars. Suzuki batted .380 and collected seven stolen bases in the series, winning praise from several of his MLB counterparts, including Sammy Sosa and Jamie Moyer, who would become his teammate with the Mariners.

In 2000, Suzuki was still a year away from being eligible for free agency, but the Blue Wave was no longer among Japan's best teams. Because the team would probably not be able to afford to keep him and would lose him without compensation in another year, Orix allowed him to negotiate with MLB clubs. Suzuki used the posting system, and the Seattle Mariners won the right to negotiate with him with a bid of approximately $13 million. In November, Suzuki signed a three-year, $14 million contract with the Mariners. In his nine NPB seasons in Japan, Suzuki had 1,278 hits, a .353 career batting average, and won seven Golden Glove Awards. Suzuki's time in the Japanese baseball leagues matured him as a player and a person, and he often credits it for his success.

=== Seattle Mariners (2001–2012) ===
==== 2001: Rookie of the Year and AL MVP ====
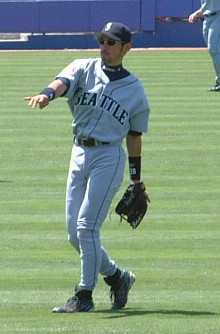
Suzuki in July 2001

Due to an agreement between Japanese baseball and the MLB, Suzuki was not allowed to play in the United States before 2001. His move to the United States was viewed with some interest because he was among the first Japanese position players to play for an MLB team. In the same way that many Japanese teams had considered the 18-year-old Suzuki too small to draft in 1992, many Americans believed he would prove too frail to succeed against major league pitching or endure the longer 162-game season. Suzuki made an auspicious debut with Seattle, and in the Mariners' eighth game revealed his tremendous throwing arm by gunning down Terrence Long of the Oakland Athletics, who had tried to advance from first to third on a teammate's single to right field. That play would be dubbed "The Throw" by Japanese media covering Suzuki.

After expressing no preference as to a uniform number, Suzuki was issued #51 by the Mariners, which was his number when he played in Japan. He was initially hesitant because it had previously been worn by pitching star Randy Johnson. To avoid insulting Johnson, Suzuki sent a personal message to the pitcher promising not to "bring shame" to the uniform. His trepidation was unfounded, as he had a spectacular 2001 season, accumulating a rookie-record 242 hits, breaking Lloyd Waner's record of 223 hits in 1927, and the most hits by any MLB player since 1930. His perennial Gold Glove fielding led Safeco's right field to be dubbed "Area 51". With a .350 batting average and 56 stolen bases, Suzuki was the first player to lead his league in both categories since Jackie Robinson in 1949. The season included hitting streaks of 25 and 23 games, an appearance on the cover of Sports Illustrated, and intense media attention on both sides of the Pacific. Fans from Japan were taking $2,000 baseball tours, sometimes flying in and out of the U.S. just to watch Suzuki's games. More than 150 Japanese reporters and photographers were given media access. Safeco Field's sushi stands began selling "Ichirolls", a spicy tuna roll served with wasabi and ginger.

Aided by MLB's decision to allow All-Star voting in Japan, Suzuki was the first rookie to lead all players in All-Star Game voting. That winter, he won the American League (AL) Most Valuable Player and the Rookie of the Year awards, becoming only the second player in MLB history (after Fred Lynn) to receive both honors in the same season. Suzuki is the only player ever to win an MVP, Rookie of the Year, Gold Glove Award, and Silver Slugger Award and start in the All-Star Game in the same season.

2001 was an exceptionally successful regular season for the Mariners, as they matched the 1906 Chicago Cubs' major league record of 116 wins. In his only postseason appearance with the Mariners, Suzuki continued his hot hitting, batting .600 in the AL Division Series (ALDS) against the Cleveland Indians. However, on Suzuki's 28th birthday, Seattle's stellar season ended against the New York Yankees in the AL Championship Series (ALCS), as Suzuki was held to a .222 average during the series. Yankees manager Joe Torre had emphasized to his pitchers, "Do not let Ichiro beat you. He is the key to Seattle's offense." Informed of this assessment, Suzuki said, "If that is true, it would give me great joy. I don't believe he is right."

==== 2002 ====
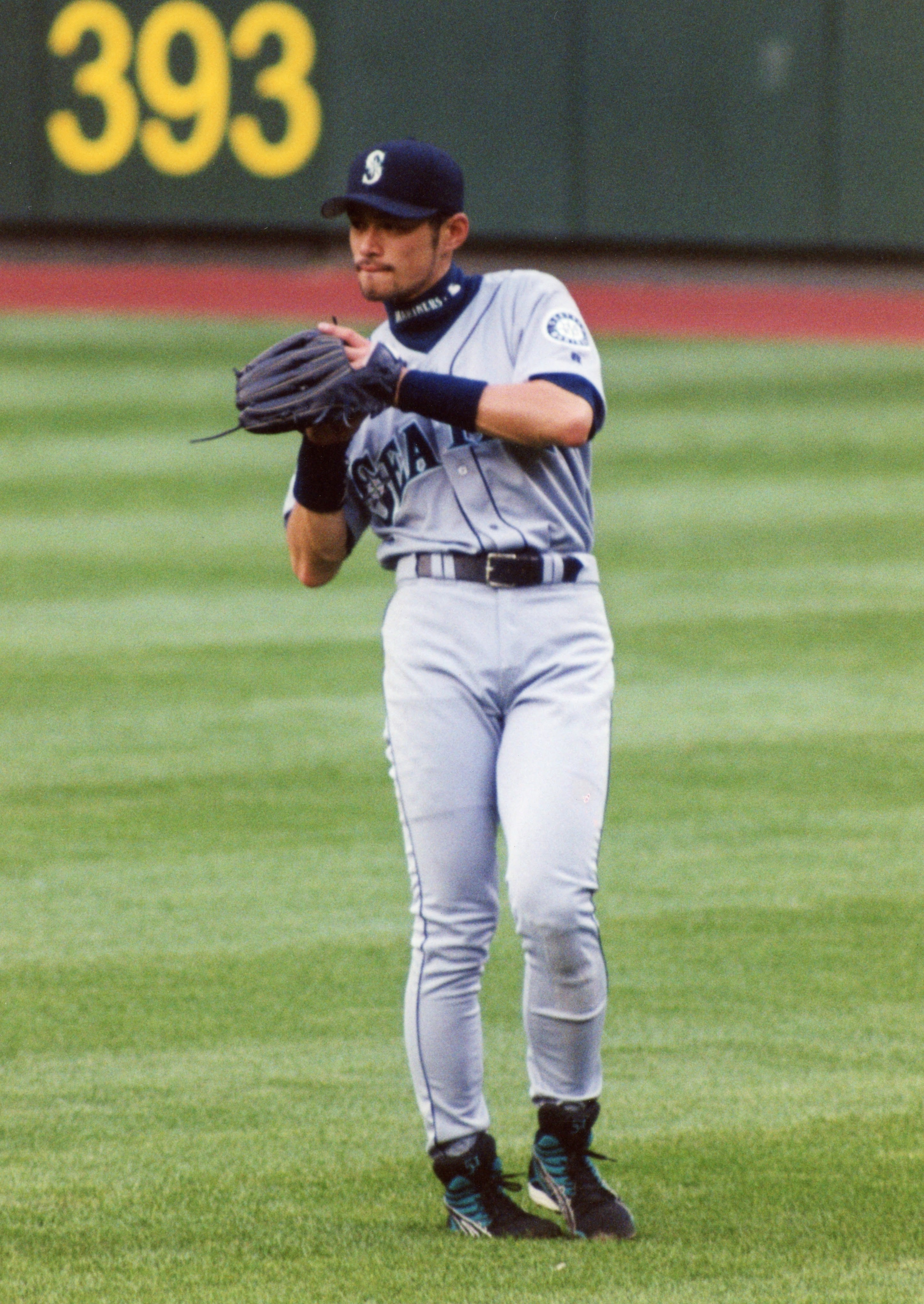
Suzuki in right field in 2002

Suzuki finished his second year in American baseball with 208 hits, making him the first Mariners player with two consecutive seasons of at least 200 hits. He was the sixth player in MLB history to start a career with two 200-hit seasons. He got off to a hot start, batting .363 on July 25, but a late-season slump drove his batting average down to .321, 29 points below his rookie batting average. Suzuki finished the season second in the AL in hits, fourth in batting average, and fourth in steals. He led All-Star Game balloting for the second straight year. Although the Mariners had a 93–69 record, that was good for only a third-place finish in the competitive AL West division.

==== 2003 ====
In 2003, Suzuki became just the third player in history to begin his career with three 200-hit seasons, by garnering 212. He again finished in the top 10 in the AL in hits, batting average, steals, and runs. Again, a late-season slump brought his average down by 42 points from mid-July to .312. Suzuki was elected to his third All-Star game, and he was again the vote leader in both leagues. However, the second-place Mariners again fell short of the playoffs. Following the season, Suzuki signed a 4-year, $44 million contract that kept him with the Mariners through 2007.

==== 2004: Single-season hit record ====
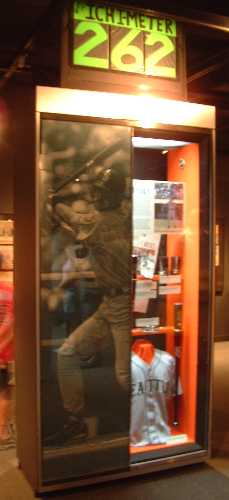
The display of Ichiro Suzuki, located on the third floor of the National Baseball Hall of Fame and Museum, which shows the Ichi-meter, record for hits in a season for Ichiro Suzuki in 2004

Suzuki had his best offensive season in 2004, highlighted by his breaking of George Sisler's 84-year-old record for most hits (257) in a season. The longer, 162-game MLB schedule, in place since 1961, benefited Suzuki, as he accumulated only 251 hits through the first 154 games of the season. Suzuki recorded 50 hits in four different months of the year (with September and October combined), becoming the first player ever to have four in a season. With 51 hits in August 2001, Suzuki joined Pete Rose as the only players with four 50-hit months in a career.

On May 21, Suzuki recorded his 2,000th professional hit. His 200th hit of 2004 came in his 126th game. By the end of September, with one three-game series remaining, Suzuki's hit total stood at 256—one shy of Sisler. Suzuki singled off the Texas Rangers' Ryan Drese on October 1 to tie Sisler's record. In the third inning, on a 3–2 count, Suzuki singled up the middle for his 258th hit of the year, which Suzuki later called "the greatest moment of my baseball career." He was greeted by a swarm of teammates, and a standing ovation from the fans. Sisler's daughter, Frances Sisler Drochelman, attended the game and was greeted by Suzuki after his hit. Suzuki finished the season with a record of 262 hits, giving him the single-season records for both MLB and NPB.

In July 2009, while in St. Louis for his ninth All-Star appearance, Suzuki made a trip to Sisler's grave. He later told reporters, "There's not many chances to come to St. Louis. In 2004, it was the first time I crossed paths with him, and his family generously came all the way to Seattle. Above all, it was a chance. I wanted to do that for a grand upperclassman of the baseball world. I think it's only natural for someone to want to do that, to express my feelings in that way. I'm not sure if he's happy about it."

From 2001 to 2004, Suzuki had more hits (924) than anyone in history over any four-year period, breaking the record of 918 that Bill Terry accumulated from 1929 to 1932; Terry, however, played in 34 fewer games than Suzuki during their respective four-year spans. Suzuki would later surpass his own mark by recording 930 hits from 2004 to 2007. During the 59-game stretch from June 30 to September 4, Suzuki batted .460. By comparison, Joe DiMaggio batted .408 during his record 56-game hitting streak. Suzuki batted .404 against left-handed pitching, despite lacking the platoon advantage, in 2004.

==== 2005 ====
During the off-season, then-manager Bob Melvin's contract was not extended and the Mariners brought in Mike Hargrove as the new manager with a contract through 2007. Hargrove, when Suzuki still played in Japan, had predicted that Suzuki would be no better than "a fourth outfielder on [an American] major league team". Speculation started that Hargrove and Suzuki did not get along very well in the season.

In 2005, Suzuki had his second worst year in his MLB career to date, collecting only 206 hits, the lowest total of his career to that point. However, he reached the plateau of a .300 batting average, 100+ runs, 30+ steals, and 200+ hits for the fifth straight season. That made him the first player to collect 200 hits in each of his first five years in the major leagues. Only Willie Keeler, Wade Boggs, Chuck Klein, Al Simmons, and Charlie Gehringer had five consecutive 200-hit seasons at any point in their careers. During the season, Suzuki accumulated 1,000 career hits, reaching the career milestone faster than any player in MLB history. Suzuki hit a career-high 15 home runs.

==== 2006 ====
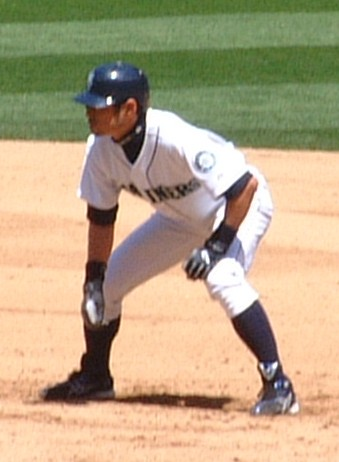
Suzuki in 2006

Suzuki's 2006 season got off to a disappointing start, with the outfielder hitting as low as .177 on April 18. He quickly rebounded, finishing the season with a .322 average (sixth in the AL and 11th in the majors). Suzuki's 224 hits led the majors, and he had 110 runs and 45 stolen bases. He was caught stealing only twice for a 96% success rate. His 1,354 career MLB hits topped Wade Boggs's record for the most hits in any six-year period. In his sixth year in the majors, Suzuki collected his sixth Gold Glove Award, and a sixth All-Star Game selection. He also won a Fielding Bible Award as the best fielding MLB right fielder.

Suzuki began wearing high stocking baseball pants in the 2006 World Baseball Classic (WBC).

==== 2007 ====
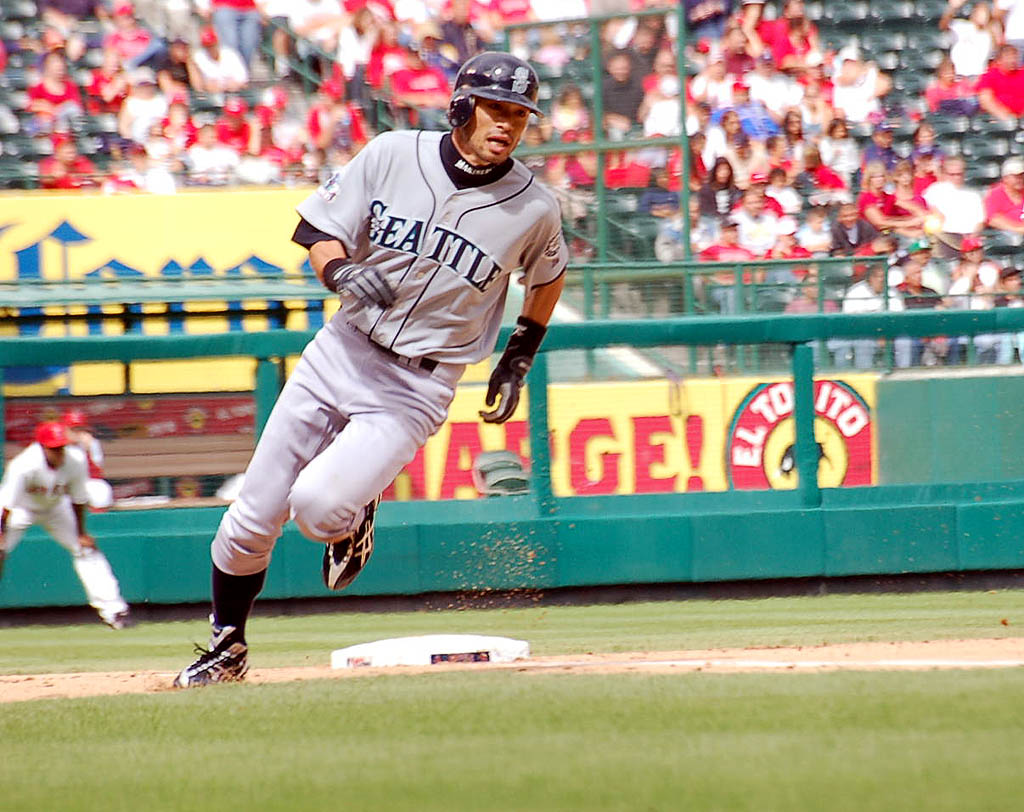
Suzuki rounding the bases on September 22, 2007

In May and June, Suzuki hit in 25 consecutive games, breaking the previous Mariners record set by Joey Cora in 1997. Suzuki broke Tim Raines' AL record by stealing 41 consecutive bases without being caught. Suzuki extended the record to 45; the major league record of 50 belongs to Vince Coleman.

On July 10, Suzuki became the first player to hit an inside-the-park home run in an All-Star Game after an unpredictable hop off the right field wall of AT&T Park in San Francisco. It was the first inside-the-park home run of his professional career. Suzuki was a perfect 3-for-3 in the game and was named the Most Valuable Player in the AL's 5–4 victory. On July 29, Suzuki collected his 1,500th MLB hit, the third fastest to reach the MLB milestone behind Simmons and Sisler.

2007 marked the end of Suzuki's second contract with the Mariners, and he initially told MLB.com that he would likely enter the free agency, citing the team's lack of success in recent years. However, Suzuki signed a five-year contract extension with Seattle in July. The deal was reported to be worth $90 million, consisting of a $17 million annual salary and $5 million signing bonus. The Associated Press reported that Suzuki's contract extension deferred $25 million of the $90 million at 5.5% interest until after his retirement, with payments through 2032. Other provisions in Suzuki's contract included a yearly housing allowance of more than $30,000, and four first-class round-trip tickets to Japan each year for his family. He was provided with either a new Jeep or Mercedes SUV, as well as a personal trainer and interpreter.

==== 2008 ====
Suzuki had 213 hits in 2008, his eighth straight 200-hit season. This tied the 107-year-old record set by Willie Keeler. Typically, Suzuki was among baseball's leaders in reaching base on an error (14 times in 2008, most in the AL), and in infield hits (his 56 were the most in the majors). Suzuki amassed an estimated 694 infield hits in his MLB career. Detroit third baseman Brandon Inge told The New York Times, "I wish you could put a camera at third base to see how he hits the ball and see the way it deceives you. You can call some guys' infield hits cheap, but not his. He has amazing technique." In May, Suzuki stole two bases, giving him 292 career steals, besting the franchise record of 290 set by Julio Cruz. Cruz, who worked on Spanish-language broadcasts of Mariners games at the time, was watching from the broadcast booth as Suzuki broke his record.

On July 29, Suzuki became the second-youngest player to amass 3,000 top-level professional hits (1,278 in Japan and 1,722 in the U.S.) after Ty Cobb. He also became just the second Japanese professional to get 3,000 hits. (NPB's record holder is Isao Harimoto, with 3,085 hits).

By 2008, it had emerged in the media that Suzuki was known within baseball for his tradition of exhorting the AL team with a profanity-laced pregame speech in the clubhouse prior to the All-Star Game. Asked if the speech had had any effect on the AL's decade-long winning streak, Suzuki deadpanned, "I've got to say over 90 percent." Minnesota first baseman Justin Morneau describes the effect: "If you've never seen it, it's definitely something pretty funny. It's hard to explain, the effect it has on everyone. It's such a tense environment. Everyone's a little nervous for the game, and then he comes out. He doesn't say a whole lot the whole time he's in there, and all of a sudden, the manager gets done with his speech, and he pops off." Boston's slugger David Ortiz says simply, "It's why we win."

==== 2009 ====
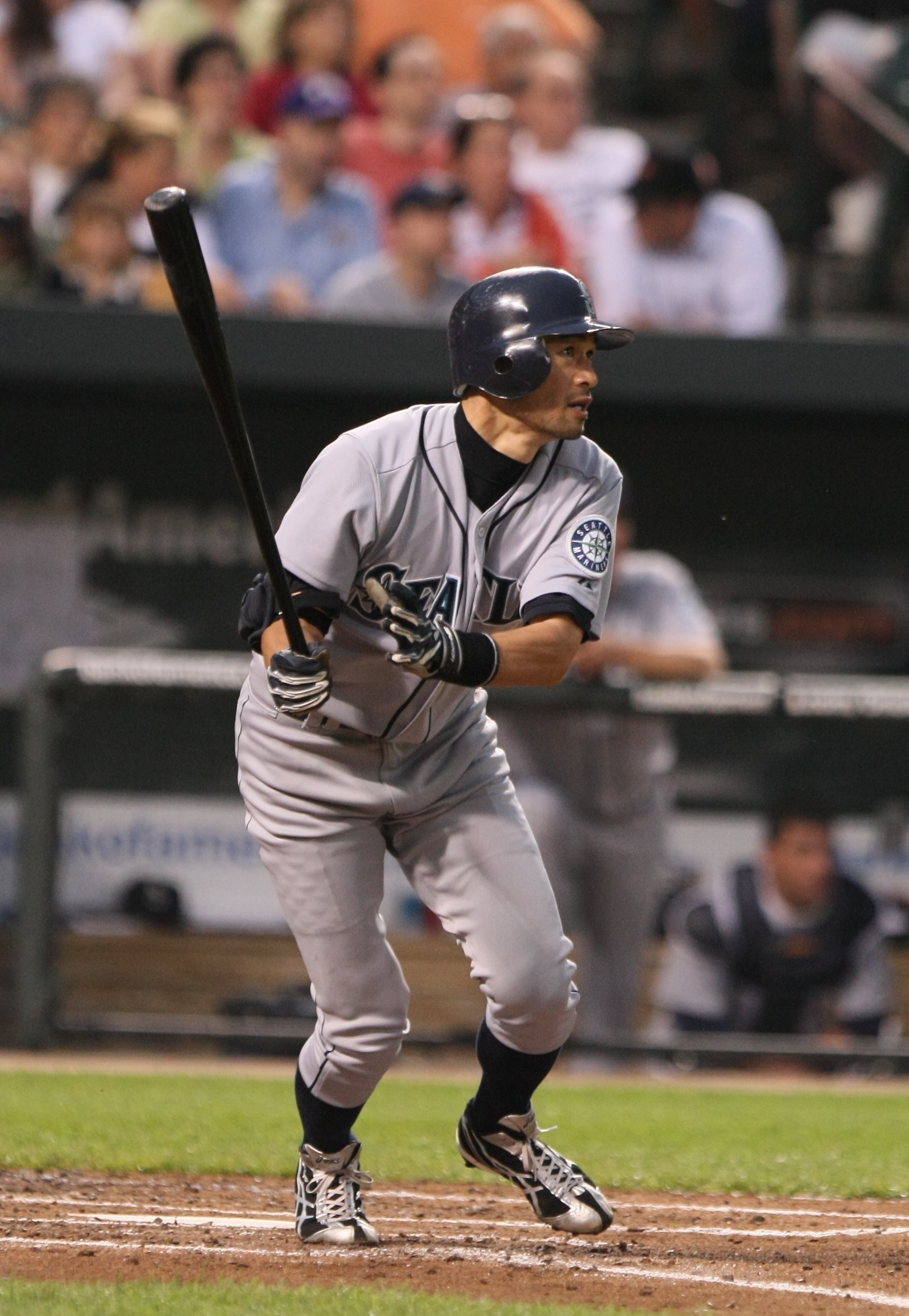
Suzuki in 2009

Suzuki began his 2009 season by going on the disabled list for the first time in his career. He had a bleeding ulcer, which team doctor Mitch Storey said may have been caused in part by the stress of playing in the WBC. After missing 8 games, Suzuki debuted on April 15 and went 2-for-5 against the Angels, including a grand slam for his 3,085th overall professional career hit. The home run matched Harimoto's Japanese record for career hits, and Harimoto flew out to Seattle to witness the event. Suzuki surpassed the record the following night.

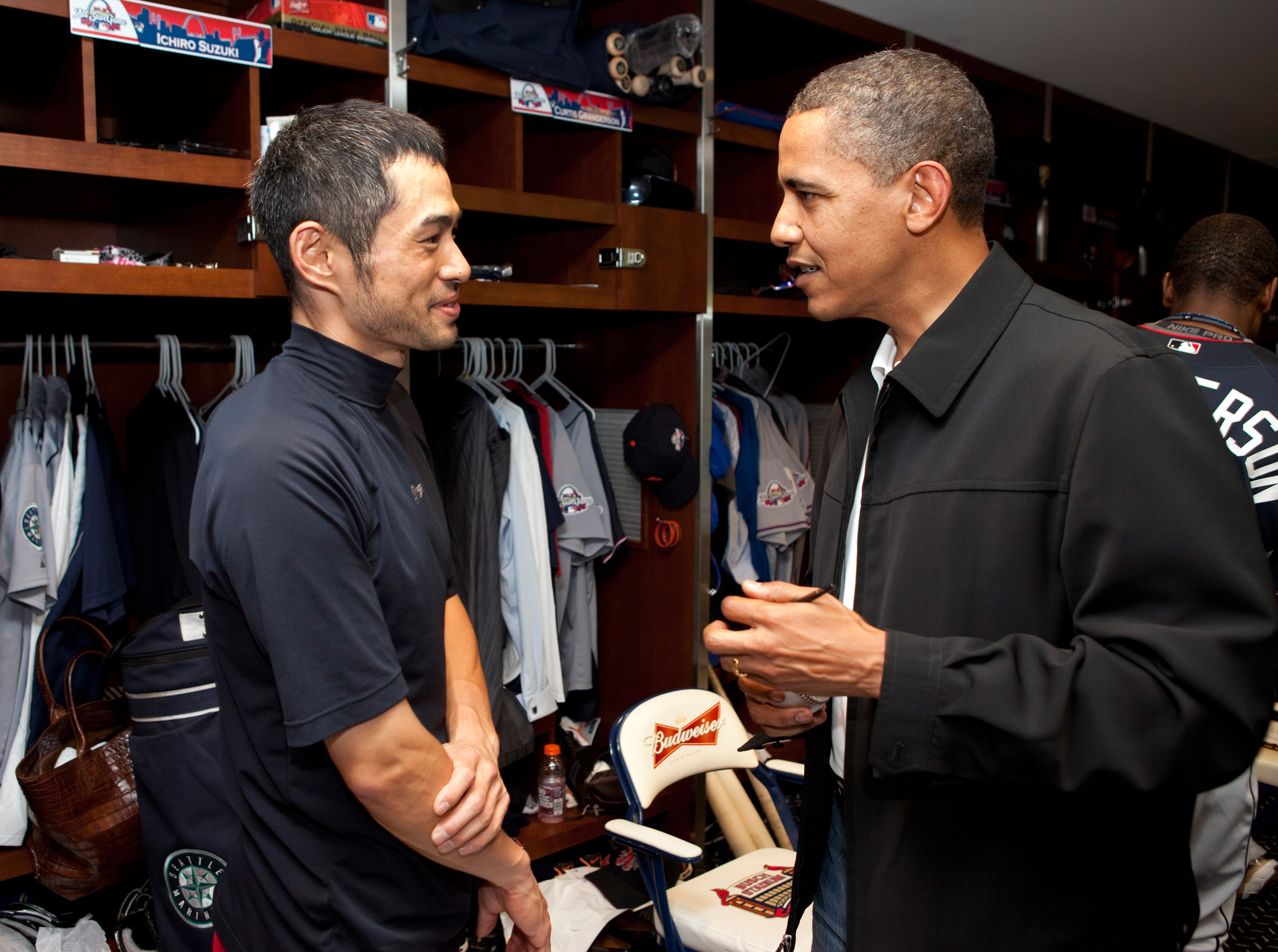
Suzuki meeting President Barack Obama before the 2009 All-Star Game

Suzuki was named #30 on the Sporting News' 2009 list of the 50 greatest current players in baseball, voted upon by a 100-person panel of experts and former stars. In May and June, Suzuki surpassed his own franchise record with a 27-game hitting streak. Suzuki had 44 hits in June, the 20th month in his MLB career with 40 or more hits. The two previous players to accomplish this were Stan Musial and Lou Gehrig.

On September 6 against the Oakland A's, Suzuki collected his 2,000th MLB hit on the second pitch of the game, a double along the first base foul line. He is the second-fastest player to reach the milestone, behind Al Simmons. On September 13 against the Rangers, Suzuki collected his 200th hit of the season for the ninth consecutive year, setting an all-time major league record.

With two outs in the bottom of the 9th inning on September 18, Suzuki hit a walk-off home run against Yankees closer Mariano Rivera, scoring Michael Saunders in one of the more memorable victories of the season. His homer made a winner out of Félix Hernández, who was in line for the loss despite having allowed only one run in nine innings pitched.

On September 26, Suzuki was ejected from a game for the first time in his professional career. Arguing that a strikeout pitch from Toronto's David Purcey had been outside, Suzuki used his bat to draw a line on the outer edge of the plate, and was immediately tossed by umpire Brian Runge. He was the only Mariner to be ejected from a game all season. The ejection may have hurt Suzuki's chances regarding an esoteric record: the longest playing streak without going hitless in consecutive games. Suzuki's stretch was at 180 games, the longest in the majors since Doc Cramer went 191 consecutive games without back-to-back 0-fers in 1934–35. Suzuki went hitless in the following afternoon's game.

Suzuki again led the majors in hits in 2009, with 225. In spite of hitting ground balls at a rate of 55 percent, he grounded into only one double play all season; in his first game on April 15. He won his second Fielding Bible Award as the best fielding right fielder in MLB. Suzuki totaled 2,030 hits in the 2000s, 90 more than any other MLB player despite not playing in 2000.

==== 2010 ====
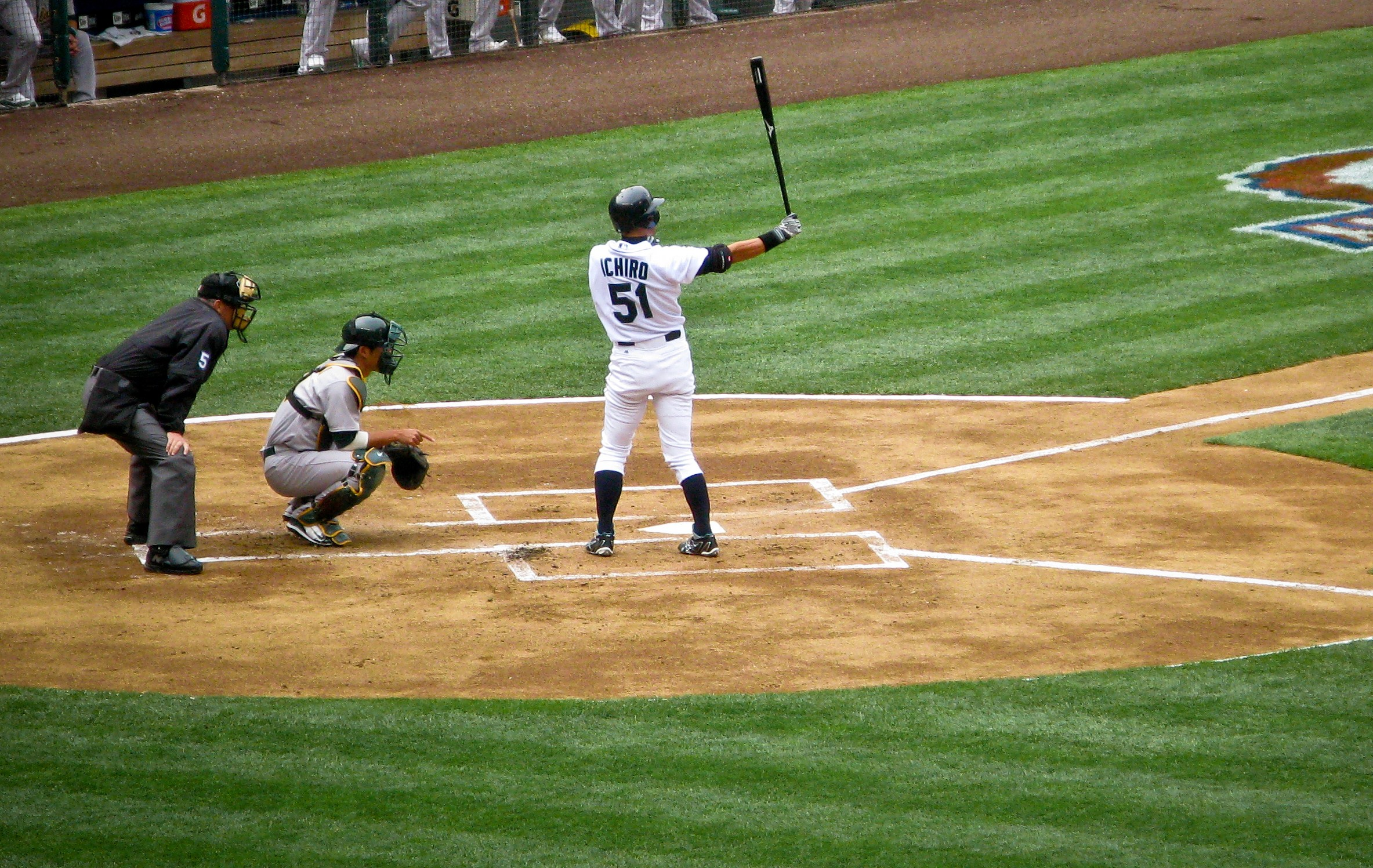
Suzuki batting in 2010

Suzuki's 37 career leadoff home runs rank 14th all time, as of 2026. Nevertheless, in 2009, Suzuki told The New York Times:

Chicks who dig home runs aren't the ones who appeal to me. I think there's sexiness in infield hits because they require technique. I'd rather impress the chicks with my technique than with my brute strength. Then, every now and then, just to show I can do that, too, I might flirt a little by hitting one out.

After playing in the season opener against Oakland, Suzuki became eligible for Hall of Fame consideration, by playing in his tenth MLB season. On June 5, Suzuki scored his 1,000th career MLB run against the Angels on Franklin Gutierrez's RBI groundout. On September 1, Suzuki collected his 2,200th hit, a leadoff infield single against Cleveland Indians pitcher Josh Tomlin.

During an August series against the New York Yankees, Suzuki traveled to the Calvary Cemetery in Queens, New York, to pay his respects at the grave of Hall of Famer "Wee" Willie Keeler, whose record for consecutive 200-hit seasons he had broken in 2009.

On September 23, Suzuki hit a single to center field against Toronto Blue Jays pitcher Shawn Hill to become the first MLB player in history to reach the 200 hit mark for 10 consecutive seasons. This feat tied him with Pete Rose for the most career seasons of at least 200 hits, and he surpassed Ty Cobb for most career seasons of 200+ hits in the AL. He finished the season with 214 hits, topping MLB in that category. Suzuki also finished the season "ironman" style, playing in all 162 games; Matt Kemp was the only other player to do so. Suzuki was nominated for the This Year in Baseball Award. Suzuki finished first or second in hits in all of his first 10 MLB seasons.

Suzuki won his tenth consecutive Gold Glove Award in 2010, tying Ken Griffey Jr., Andruw Jones, and Al Kaline, and trailing only Roberto Clemente and Willie Mays (twelve each) among outfielders. Suzuki also won his second consecutive and third overall Fielding Bible Award for his defensive excellence in right field. Suzuki was the first right fielder in MLB history to win multiple such awards.

==== 2011 ====
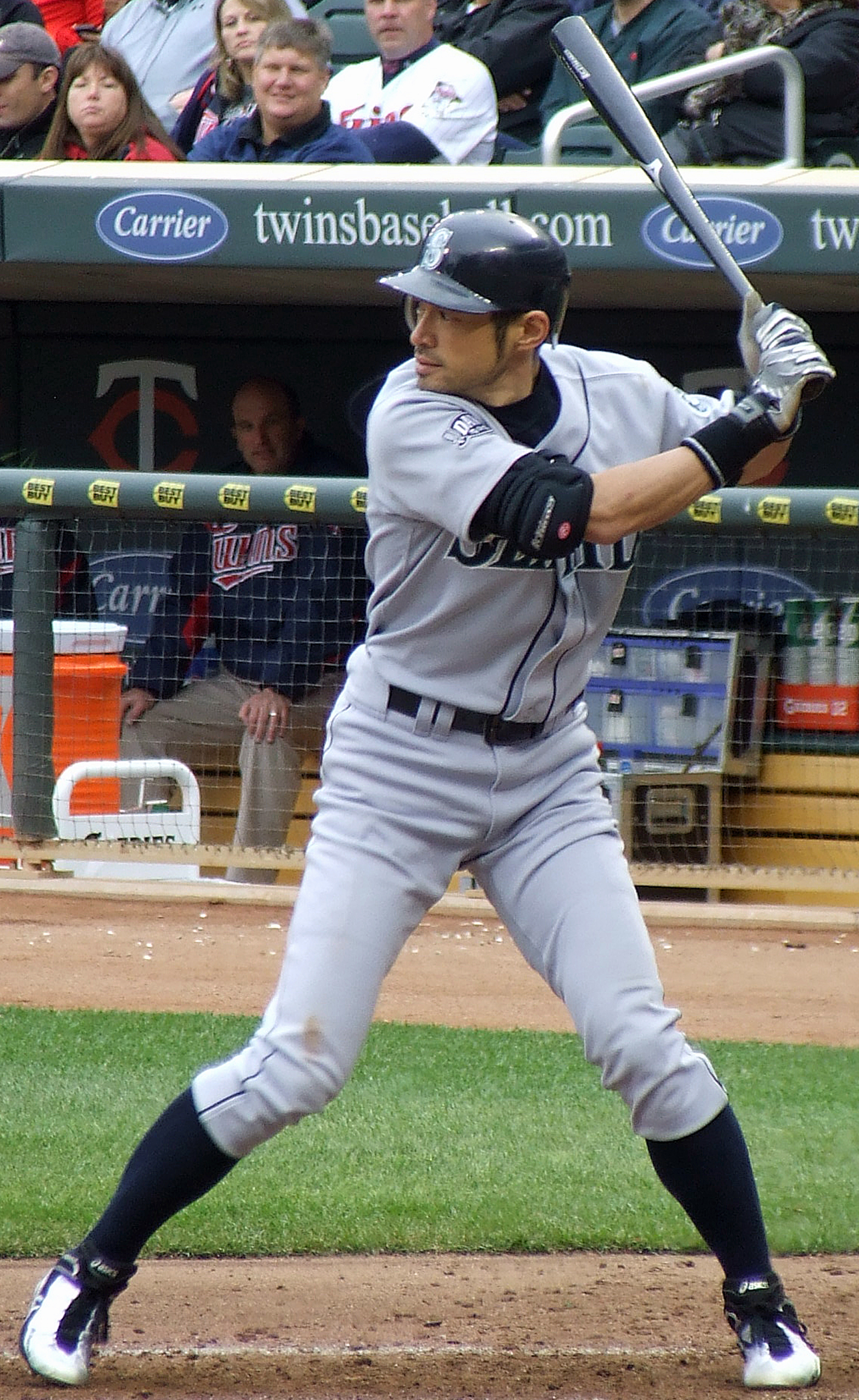
Suzuki in 2011

On April 2, 2011, Suzuki broke the Mariners' franchise hits record with his 2,248th hit in the ninth inning against the Athletics, overtaking Edgar Martínez. 2011 marked the first time in Suzuki's 11 seasons that he failed to make the All-Star team. He batted under .300 (.277) before the All-Star break for the first time in his career. On July 10, manager Eric Wedge did not start Suzuki, ending his then-major league-best active streak of 255 consecutive starts. Suzuki followed with an 11-game hitting streak, but Wedge noted "it's not that easy to give that guy a day off" due to Suzuki's iconic stature. On August 22, Suzuki hit his 35th career leadoff homer, tying him for sixth place with Bobby Bonds at the time. Suzuki finished the season batting a career-low .272 with 184 hits, the first time in his 11-year MLB career he did not record 200 hits. It was also his first season not winning a Gold Glove.

==== 2012 ====
On June 19, 2012, Suzuki led off a game against the Arizona Diamondbacks with a single to center field, the 2,500th hit of his MLB career. Suzuki reached the milestone in the fourth-fewest games in major league history, after Al Simmons, Ty Cobb, and George Sisler. In a 13-inning road loss to Oakland on July 8, Suzuki was placed second in the batting order, going 2-for-6 to bring his season batting average to .261 heading into the All-Star break. In the previous night's game, Suzuki recorded two hits to break a career-worst 0-for-23 hitless streak. Suzuki was also tried at the third spot in the batting order during a season for which he earned $18 million. Former teammate Jay Buhner stated he felt Suzuki was the recipient of too much blame for the Mariners' difficulties but "at the same time, they need help desperately." Buhner stated that if Suzuki were awarded a three-year contract extension for somewhere between $35 million and $40 million, "I'd vomit. I mean, really, no offense. No offense, we've got to get this organization turned around. You can't be spending all the money on one guy."

With a contract extension with the Mariners unknown, Suzuki stated, "It's going to go both ways. It can't just come from the player. It's got to come from the team, too. If the team is saying they need you, you're necessary, then it becomes a piece. But if it's just coming from the player, it's not going to happen." Suzuki's agent, Tony Attanasio, said, "He knows that the club has to grow. He knows they have to play the younger guys and get them more playing time. The only way he knows to do that is to move on. He doesn't want to stop playing. He wants to continue."

=== New York Yankees (2012–2014) ===
==== 2012: Second postseason appearance ====
Suzuki approached the Mariners to ask for a trade during the 2012 season. His first choice was to play for the New York Yankees. The Mariners traded him to the Yankees for minor league pitchers D. J. Mitchell and Danny Farquhar and cash on July 23. Suzuki left Seattle hitting .261 with a .288 on-base percentage (OBP), four home runs, 28 RBIs and 15 stolen bases in 95 games. His first game as a Yankee was played the night of the trade, at Safeco Field against the Mariners. Before the trade was finalized, Suzuki agreed to the Yankees' conditions, which stated that they would play Suzuki primarily in left field, bat him at the bottom of the lineup, and occasionally sit him against left-handed pitching. Suzuki hit safely in his first 12 games as a Yankee, tying a record set by Don Slaught. He wore number 31 during his tenure with the Yankees, as his traditional 51 had not been used since the 2006 retirement of Bernie Williams, who wore it while playing for the Yankees.

Suzuki hit his first home run as a Yankee, and the 100th of his career, on July 30 against the Baltimore Orioles. For the week ending September 23, Suzuki was named AL Player of the Week after hitting .600 (15-for-25) with three doubles, two home runs, five RBI, seven runs scored, and six stolen bases in six games. He led all MLB players in batting average, hits, steals and OBP (.630). In 67 games with New York, Suzuki batted .322 with a .340 OBP, 28 runs, five home runs and 27 RBIs. With his improved performance, the Yankees at times batted him second and also started him against left-handers.

Against the Baltimore Orioles in the ALDS, Suzuki ran home on a ball hit by Robinson Canó. Despite the ball beating him to the plate, Orioles catcher Matt Wieters had difficulty tagging Suzuki, who evaded multiple tag attempts by jumping over and around Wieters. In Game 1 of the ALCS, Suzuki hit his first career postseason home run; however, the Yankees lost the series to the Detroit Tigers in four games.

On December 19, Suzuki finalized a two-year, $13 million contract with the Yankees.

==== 2013–2014 ====
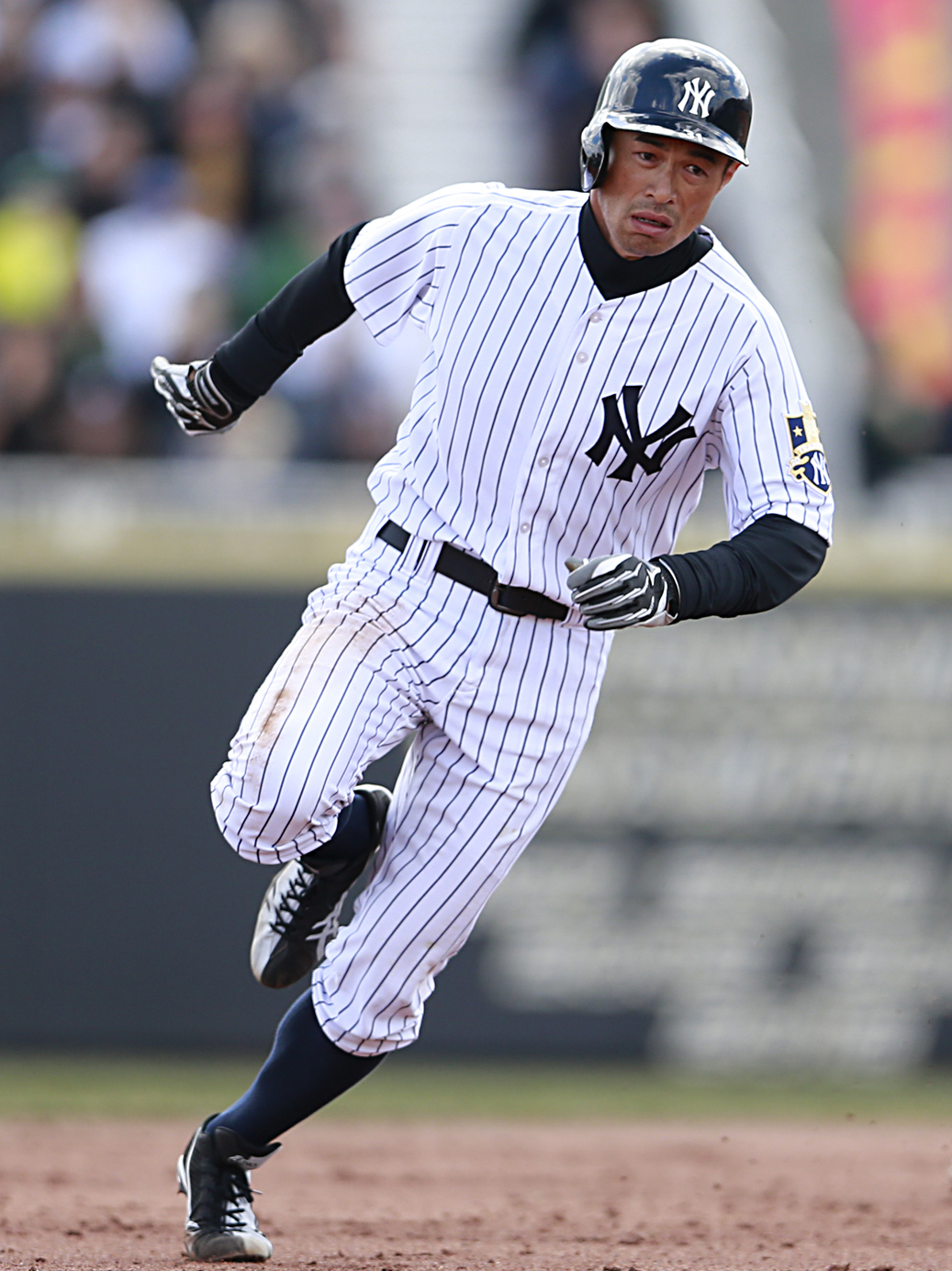
Suzuki in 2013

On June 25, 2013, Suzuki hit a walk-off home run against Rangers pitcher Tanner Scheppers with two outs in the bottom of the ninth inning. Earlier in the game, three of his teammates had led off the fourth, fifth, and sixth innings with home runs, so all of the Yankees' runs in the game were provided by solo home runs.

On August 21, Suzuki collected his 4,000th professional career hit with a single off Toronto Blue Jays pitcher R. A. Dickey, becoming the seventh player in professional baseball history known to have reached the mark after Pete Rose, Ty Cobb, Julio Franco, Hank Aaron, Jigger Statz, and Stan Musial.

On July 10, Suzuki collected his 2,800th MLB hit off of Cleveland pitcher Scott Atchison in the top of the eighth inning at Progressive Field. On August 9, Suzuki hit a single in a game against Houston to pass George Sisler on the all-time hit list with his 2,811th hit. The Yankees finished third in the AL East in Suzuki's two full seasons with the team, and he did not return to the MLB playoffs.

=== Miami Marlins (2015–2017) ===
==== 2015 ====
On January 23, 2015, Suzuki agreed to a one-year, $2 million contract with the Miami Marlins. The Marlins originally planned for him to be their fourth outfielder, but he finished the season with 439 plate appearances due to injuries—primarily Giancarlo Stanton, who suffered a season-ending injury on June 26. On April 25, Suzuki scored his 1,310th major league run, which, combined with the 658 runs he scored in Japan, surpassed the record for runs scored by a Japanese player set by Sadaharu Oh. On June 18, Suzuki was batting .294 after playing in 64 of the Marlins' 68 games, but his average fell to .229 by season's end. On August 14 at Busch Stadium, Suzuki singled off St. Louis Cardinals starter John Lackey to earn his 4,192nd top-level hit, passing Ty Cobb. On July 29, Suzuki recorded his 2,900th MLB hit, against Washington Nationals pitcher Doug Fister. On August 18, Suzuki had his first four-hit game since 2013. On August 31, against the Atlanta Braves, Suzuki scored his 2,000th professional run, combining his runs scored in MLB (1,342) and in Japan's NPB (658). On September 5, Suzuki recorded his 100th right field assist in the major leagues. In the season finale against the Philadelphia Phillies on October 4, he made his major league pitching debut, completing the final inning and allowing one run and two hits in a 7–2 loss. For the 2015 season, he batted .229/.282/.279 with 11 stolen bases.

==== 2016 ====
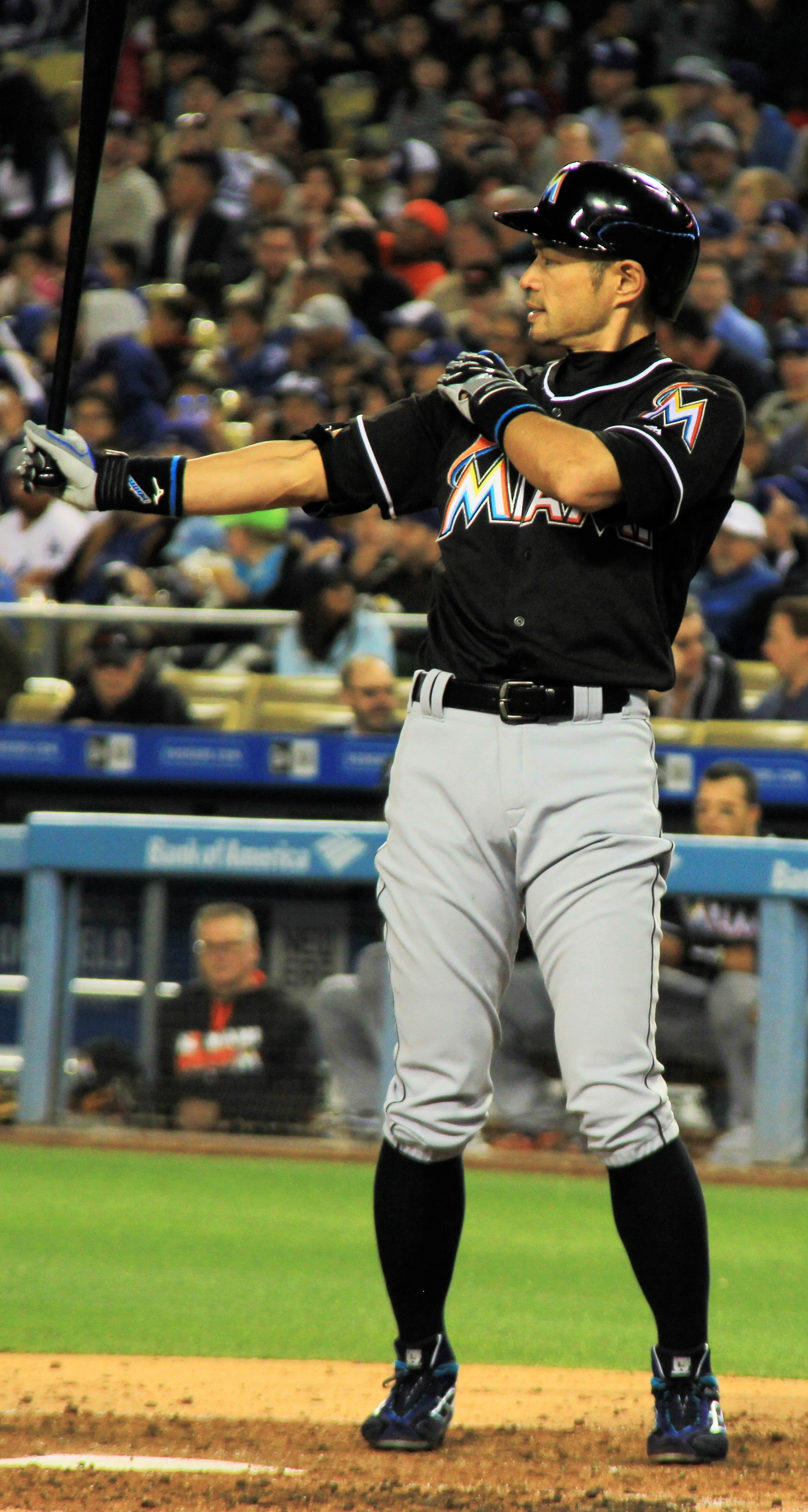
Suzuki in 2016

On October 6, 2015, Suzuki and the Marlins agreed on a one-year, $2 million contract with the Marlins. The deal also came with a $2 million club option for 2017. He stole his 500th career MLB base on April 29, 2016, against the Milwaukee Brewers, and led off the game with a single against Zach Davies to move ahead of Frank Robinson into 33rd place on the all-time MLB hit list with the 2,944th hit of his career. In May, he had the final two four-hit games of his career.

On June 15, Suzuki recorded his 4,257th career hit, breaking Pete Rose's all-time record for hits in top tier professional baseball. Rose commented that "I'm not trying to take anything away from Ichiro, he's had a Hall of Fame career, but the next thing you know you'll be counting his high school hits." This was in response to the Japanese media labeling Suzuki as the "Hit King", claiming that Suzuki should be considered to be the all-time hits leader when his hits in Japan are included. American media was more divided on the significance of the accomplishment, though some major sources acknowledged the milestone as indicating Suzuki had become the greatest hitter in baseball.

On August 7, Suzuki collected the 3,000th hit of his MLB career when he hit a triple off the right field wall at Coors Field playing against the Colorado Rockies. He is just the second player to reach that milestone by way of a triple, joining Hall of Famer Paul Molitor. He also became one of only seven players to have collected 3,000 hits and 500 stolen bases. At the end of his 16th season, Suzuki had played in exactly 2,500 major league games. Suzuki and Pete Rose are the only two players in MLB history to play in 2,500 games in their first 16 seasons.

After the 2016 season, the Marlins exercised their option on Suzuki's contract for the 2017 season, and added an option for the 2018 season.

==== 2017 ====
On April 19, 2017, Suzuki hit his first home run against his former team the Seattle Mariners, a 9th-inning drive off Evan Marshall. Suzuki scored his 1,400th run in a May 23 game against the Oakland A's.

On June 14, Suzuki singled for his 365th interleague hit, passing Derek Jeter (364) to become the all-time leader in interleague hits. Suzuki finished 2017 with 368 interleague hits. This total would be surpassed by Miguel Cabrera on September 7, 2021.

On June 25, Suzuki (age 43 and 246 days) became the oldest player to start a game in center field since at least 1900, breaking the record previously held by Rickey Henderson. On June 29, Suzuki became the oldest active MLB player when Bartolo Colón was designated for assignment by the Atlanta Braves, although Colón joined the Minnesota Twins a few weeks later. On July 6, Suzuki hit two singles against the St. Louis Cardinals, bringing his hits total to 3,054 and surpassing Panamanian-born Rod Carew as the all-time leader in MLB hits among foreign-born players. Dominican-born Adrián Beltré surpassed Suzuki as the foreign-born hits leader on June 13, 2018.

On August 26, Suzuki set the Marlins' single-season franchise record for pinch-hits with his 22nd pinch hit. On September 3, he set a major league record for most pinch-hit at-bats in a season, with 84, and four days later he set an MLB record for most pinch-hit plate appearances in a season, with 95. On September 8, Suzuki became the sixth player all-time to hit 2,500 career singles, as well as the eighth right fielder of all-time to record over 4,000 putouts at the position. On October 1, Suzuki flied out in his last chance to tie John Vander Wal's MLB record of 28 pinch hits in a season, finishing with 27.

For the season, he batted .255/.318/.332 with one stolen base (the first season in which he did not steal at least 10 bases). After the season, the Marlins declined a $2 million club option for the 2018 season, instead paying Suzuki a $500,000 buyout.

=== Return to the Mariners (2018–2019) ===
==== 2018 ====
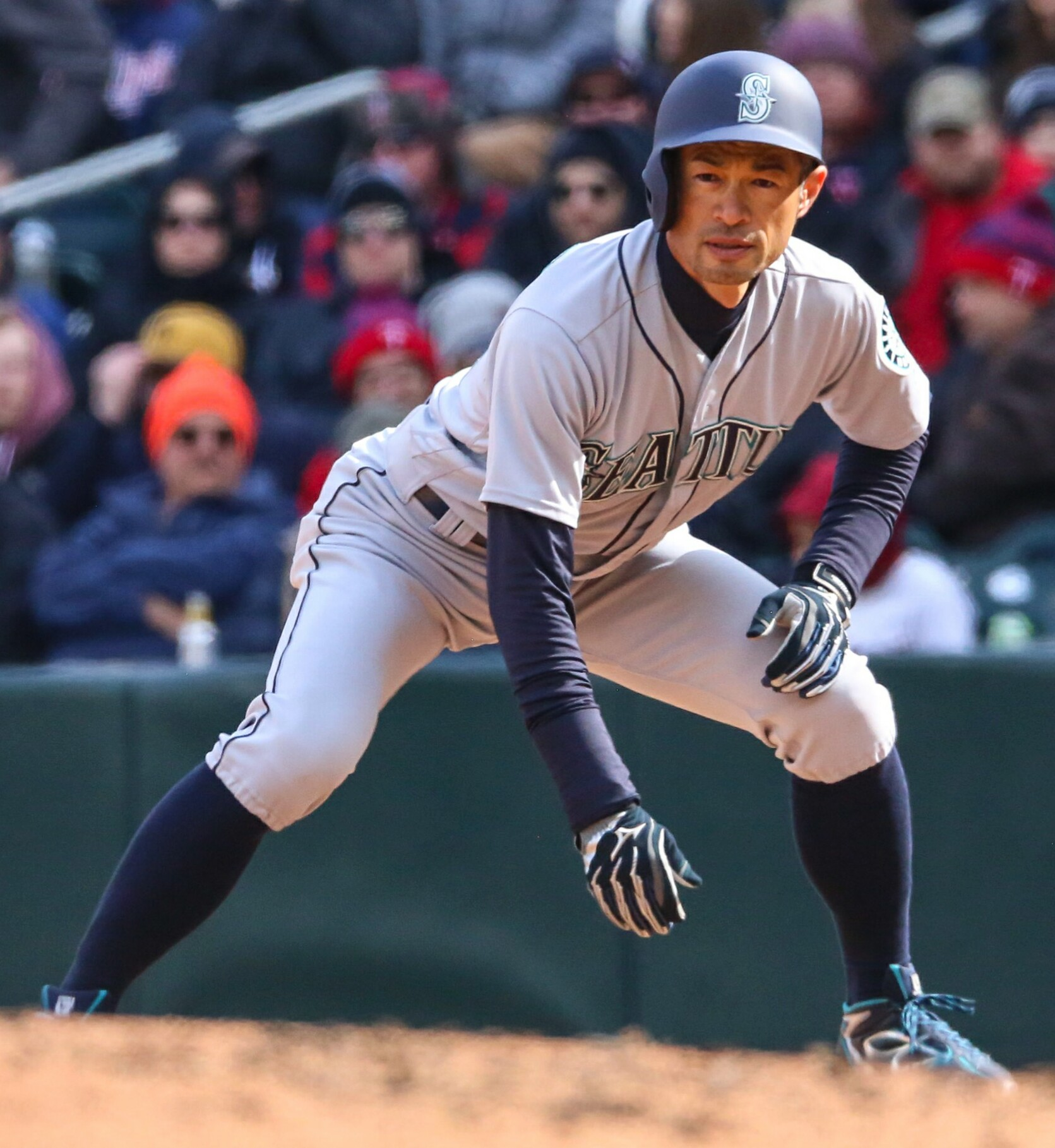
Suzuki with the Mariners in 2018

On March 7, 2018, Suzuki signed a one-year contract to return to the Mariners after several Seattle outfielders were injured during spring training. On Opening Day, March 29, against the Cleveland Indians, Suzuki became the 20th outfielder all-time to record 5,000 career putouts. At 44 years old, he entered the season as the second-oldest active player in baseball, behind only Colón.

On May 3, the Mariners announced that Suzuki would move to the front office as a special assistant to the chairman for the remainder of the season, but Suzuki did not rule out a possible return as a player in 2019. In his final game for the year on the previous day, he went 0-for-3 with a walk, a strikeout, and a run in a 3–2 loss to Oakland. This would end up being his last game played at Safeco Field. In 15 games played with the 2018 Mariners, Suzuki batted 9-for-44 (.205/.255/.205) without an extra base hit, stolen base, or RBI.

On May 11, he became the interim bench coach for two games as manager Scott Servais left to attend his daughter's college graduation and regular bench coach Manny Acta filled in as manager.

==== 2019 ====
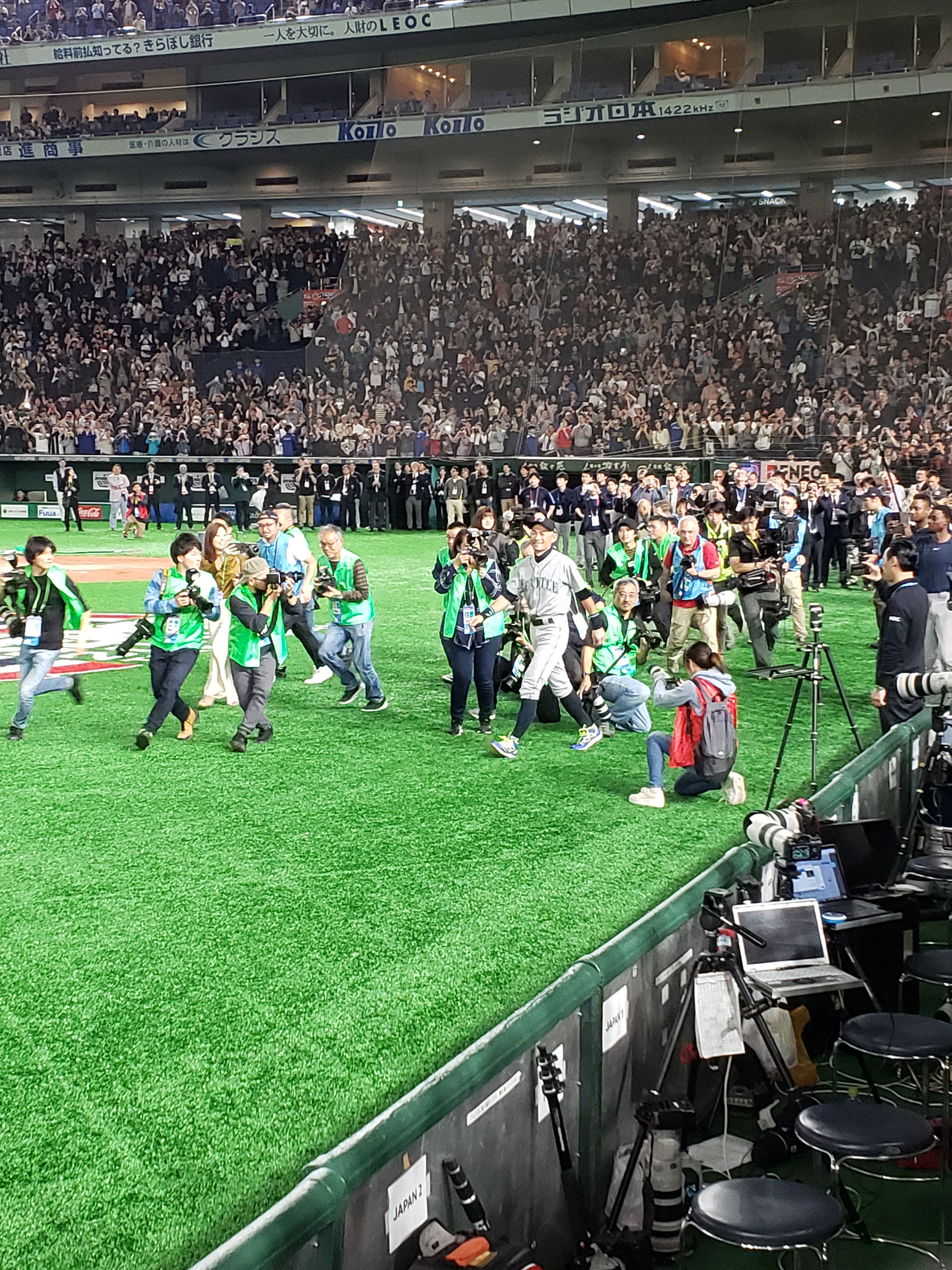
After announcing his retirement post-game, Suzuki took a lap around the Tokyo Dome, followed by photographers, to salute fans.

On October 2, 2018, it was announced that Suzuki would be on the Mariners' active roster when they opened the 2019 season against the Athletics in Japan. Suzuki was re-signed to a minor league deal on January 23, 2019.

On March 20, the Mariners opened the MLB season against the Athletics at the Tokyo Dome. Suzuki started the game in right field, becoming at 45 years old the second oldest position player (behind Julio Franco) to start for a team on Opening Day. The next night, the two teams again played at the Tokyo Dome, and Suzuki played in his final professional game. He went 0-for-4 at the plate. In the bottom of the eighth inning, he walked off the field to applause. Later in the day, Suzuki officially announced his retirement. He was the oldest active MLB player at the time.

2019 was Suzuki's 19th season in MLB, and including the nine years he played in Japan's NPB, Suzuki's 28 seasons of playing in baseball's top-tiered leagues eclipsed the record of most seasons played by a position player held previously by 19th century American major league player Cap Anson. (MLB pitcher Nolan Ryan, like Anson, also played 27 seasons, while NPB pitcher Kimiyasu Kudo played 29 seasons.)

On April 30, Suzuki renewed his role with the Mariners from the previous year as special assistant to the chairman.

== International career ==
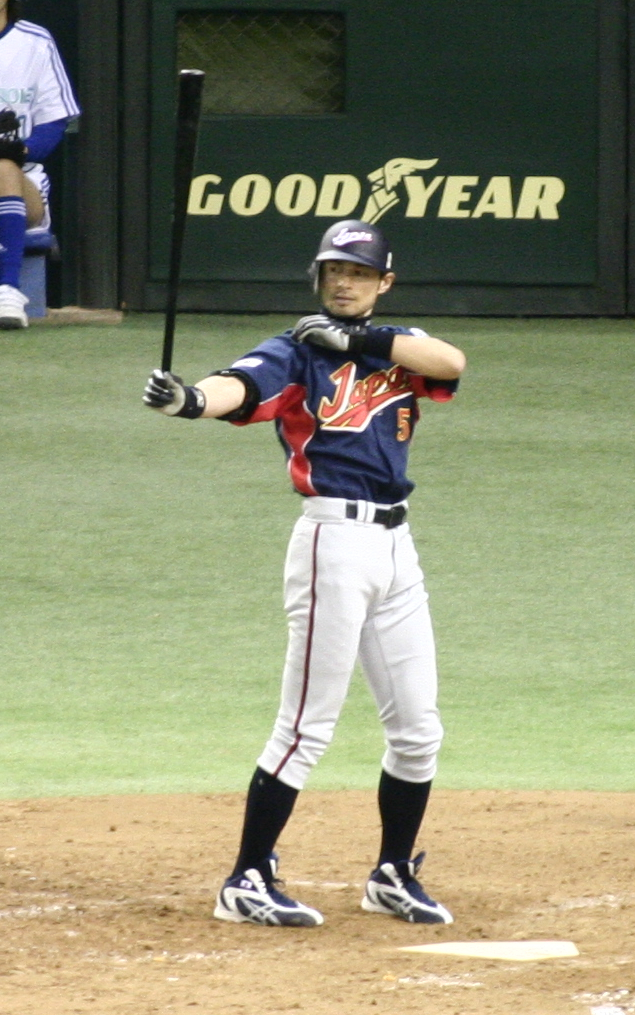
Suzuki at the 2006 World Baseball Classic

Suzuki played for the Japan national team in the inaugural World Baseball Classic in March 2006. During the March 15 Japan–South Korea game, Suzuki was booed by some spectators during every at-bat, reportedly in response to a previous statement that he wanted to "beat South Korea so badly that the South Koreans won't want to play Japan for another 30 years." That, however, was an incorrect translation mostly spread to the public through ESPN. Suzuki was variously quoted as saying "I want to win in a way that the opponent would think, 'we cannot catch up with Japan for the coming 30 years'. We should not merely win the games." Japan would later beat South Korea in the playoffs and win the tournament after defeating Cuba 10–6 in the finals. For the tournament, Suzuki had 12 hits including a home run, seven runs, and four stolen bases. He was named to the All-WBC team.

Despite struggling uncharacteristically during most of the 2009 WBC, Suzuki provided the game-winning hit in the championship game against South Korea. With two outs in the top of the 10th inning, he broke a 3–3 tie with a two-run single off a ball in the dirt. This would prove to be the margin of victory in Japan's 5–3 victory. Suzuki ended the night 4-for-6, bringing his total to 6-for-10 in the first two WBC championship games.

== Playing style ==
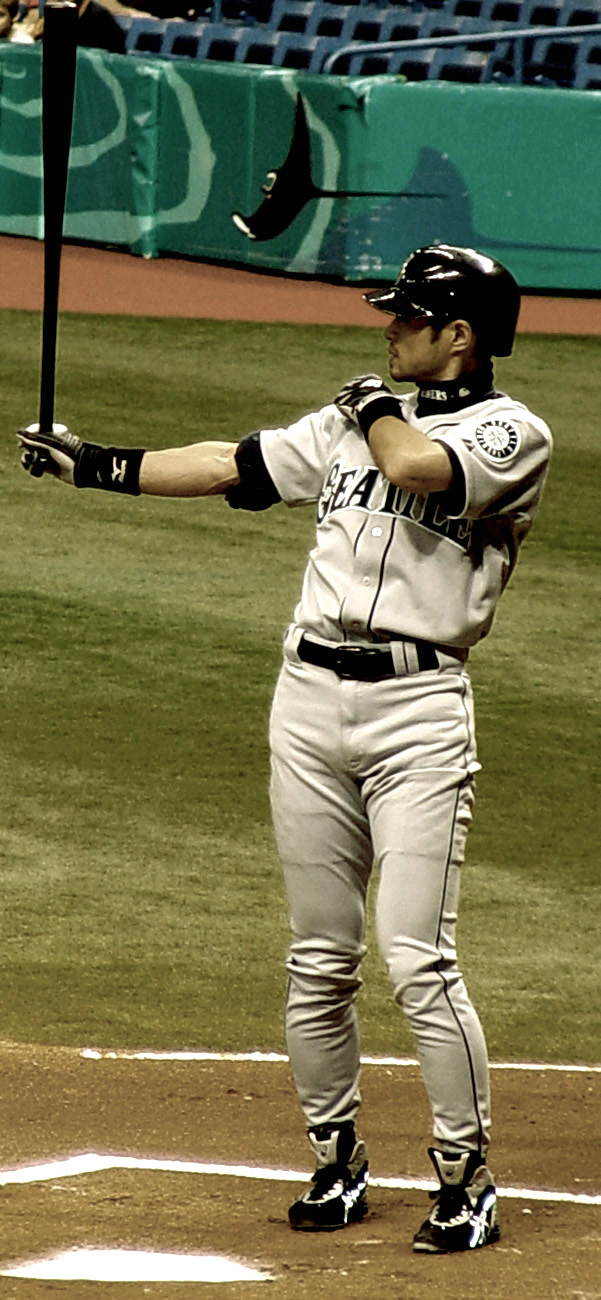
Suzuki in 2005

Sportswriter Bruce Jenkins, writing in the San Francisco Chronicle in 2004, described Suzuki's distinctive style of play:

There's nobody like Ichiro in either league—now or ever. He exists strictly within his own world, playing a game 100 percent unfamiliar to everyone else. The game has known plenty of 'slap' hitters, but none who sacrifice so much natural ability for the sake of the art. And he'll go deep occasionally in games, looking very much like someone who could do it again, often ... [but] the man lives for hits, little tiny ones, and the glory of standing atop the world in that category. Every spring, scouts or media types write him off, swearing that opposing pitchers have found the key, and they are embarrassingly wrong.

While he was known for his hitting ability, he did not draw many walks. In 2004, when he set the single-season record for hits, his low walk total (49) led to him being on base a total of 315 times, which is below the top 60 most times a player has reached base in a season, lagging the MLB record of 379 set by Babe Ruth in 1923.

The New York Times criticized his inability to improve his power when his Mariner teams were often low-scoring, also noting that he also did not steal bases as frequently as Rickey Henderson or Tim Raines. Suzuki, however, once commented, "If I'm allowed to hit .220, I could probably hit 40 [home runs], but nobody wants that."

Suzuki had long been interested in pitching professionally, and he pitched to one batter in the 1996 NPB All Star game, reaching close to 91 mph (146 km/h) in warmup pitches. During an early February 2009 workout at the WBC, his fastball was reportedly clocked at 92 mph. On the final day of the 2015 season on October 4, Suzuki pitched in his first MLB game, throwing one complete inning at the end of a 7–2 Marlins loss against the Philadelphia Phillies, allowing one run on two hits. Less than three weeks before turning 42, he was still able to touch 88 mph with his fastball to go along with a mid 80s slider.

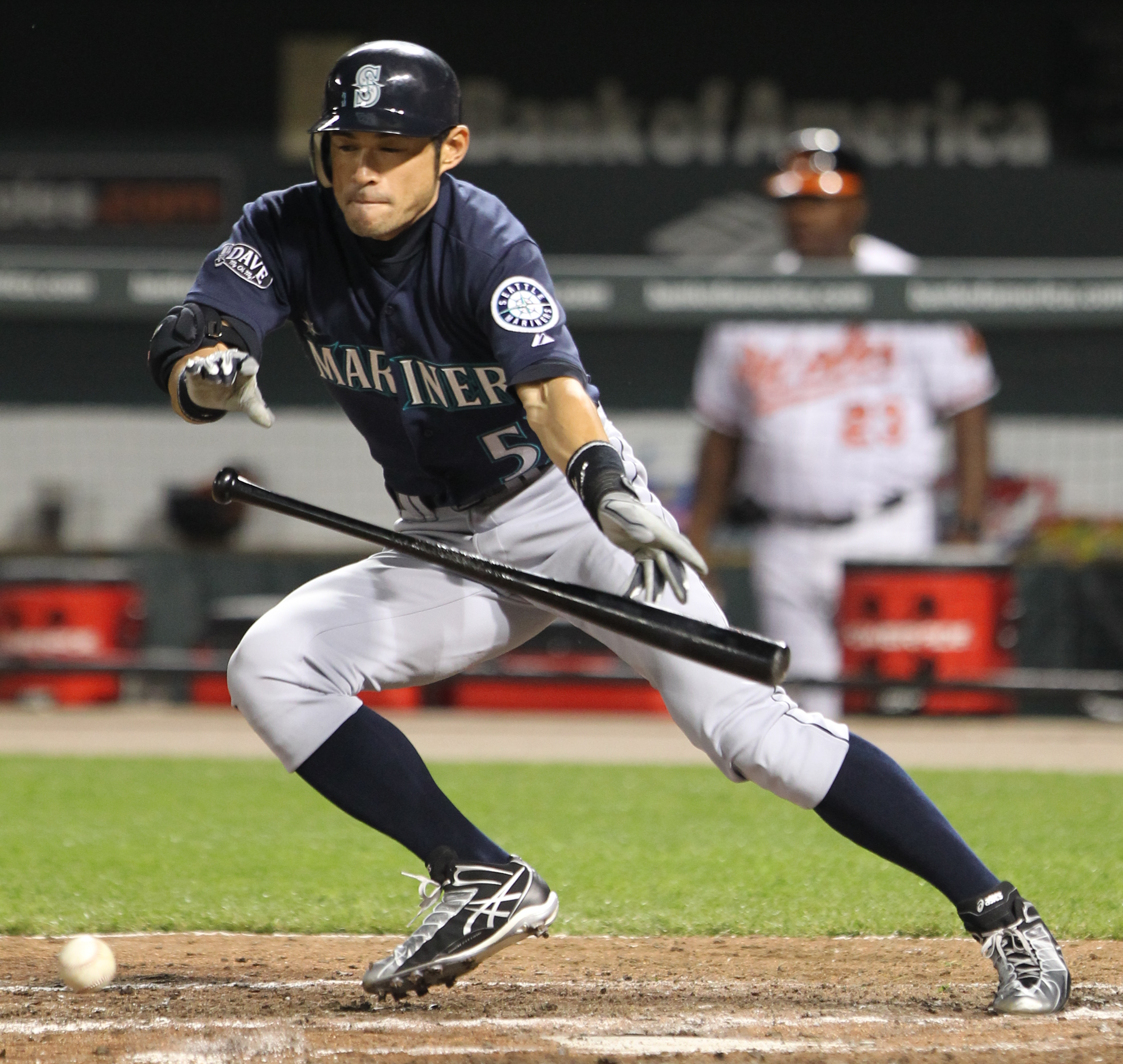
Suzuki bunting in 2011

Suzuki is the only left-handed hitter in major league history with at least 2,000 plate appearances against left-handed pitching to display a reverse platoon split—that is, he had better results hitting off left-handed pitchers than right-handed pitchers.

Suzuki received recognition for playing superior defense in right field, with above-average range and a strong and accurate throwing arm. During his MLB career, he won 10 Gold Glove Awards.

Suzuki was noted for his work ethic in arriving early for his team's games, and for his calisthenic stretching exercises to stay limber even during the middle of the game. Continuing in Seattle the custom he began in Japan, he used his given name (written in rōmaji) on the back of his uniform instead of his family name, becoming the first player in MLB to do so since Vida Blue.

== Legacy ==
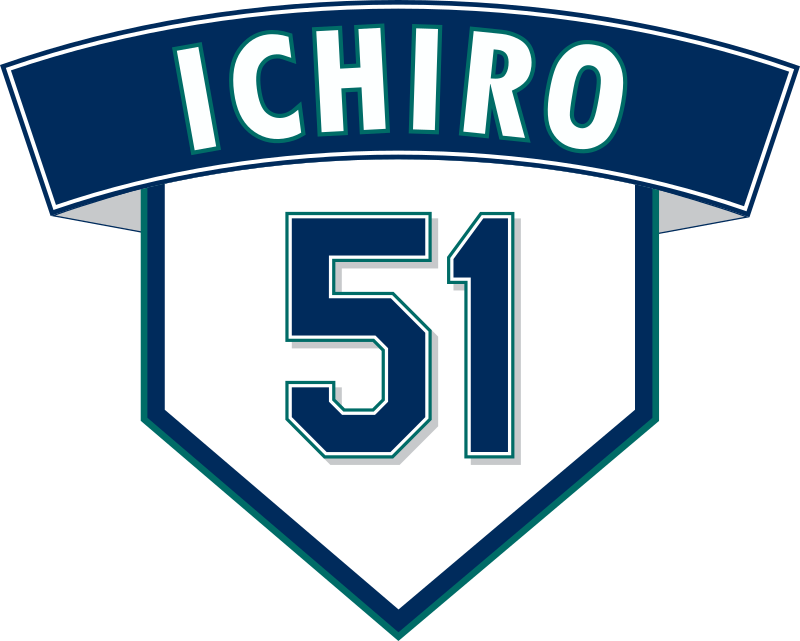
Ichiro Suzuki's number 51 was retired by the Seattle Mariners in 2025.

In addition to being a ten-time Gold Glove winner, Suzuki was a ten-time All-Star selection from 2001 to 2010. His success has been credited with opening the door for other Japanese players, including former players Hideki Matsui, Kenji Johjima, So Taguchi, and Kazuo Matsui, and active players Shohei Ohtani and Seiya Suzuki to enter MLB. Suzuki's career was followed closely in Japan, with national television news programs covering each of his at-bats, and with special tour packages arranged for Japanese fans to visit the United States to attend his games.

In 2018, researcher Jose Fernandez-Triana named a newly discovered species of wasp after Suzuki; Diolcogaster ichiroi, collected at the Archbold Biological Station in Highlands County, Florida, was named "to honor the truly unique and remarkable Ichiro Suzuki, [Fernandez-Triana's] favorite baseball player and one of the best ever to play the game" and "was still playing for a Florida team and thus naming a species endemic from Florida after him made complete sense."

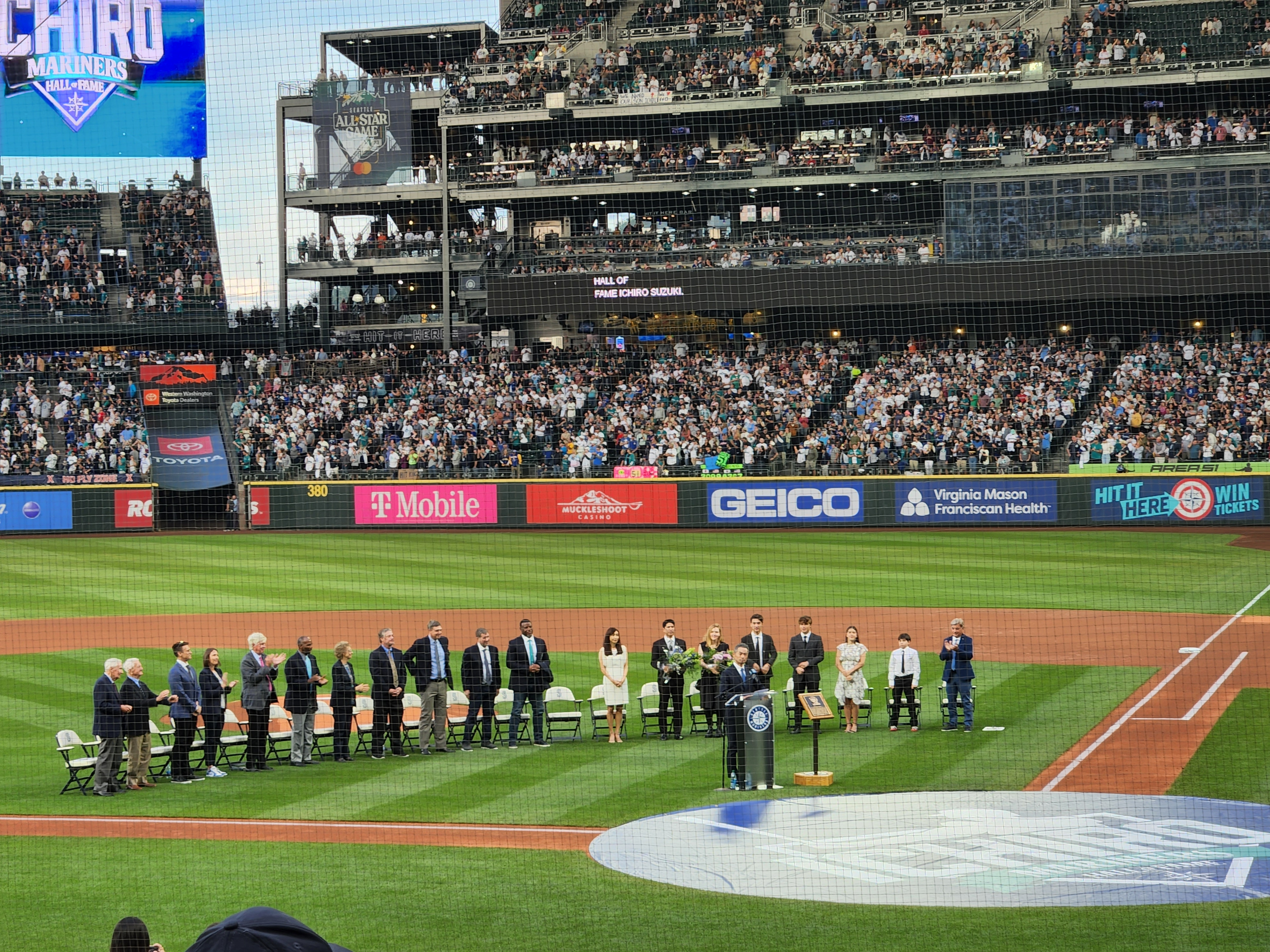
Suzuki delivers a speech to the crowd at T-Mobile Park in Seattle during his induction into the Mariners Hall of Fame.

On August 27, 2022, Suzuki was inducted into the Seattle Mariners Hall of Fame. He invited former Seattle teammates Ken Griffey Jr., Raul Ibañez, and Mike Sweeney to his induction ceremony.

On January 16, 2025, Suzuki was elected to the Japanese Baseball Hall of Fame in his first year of eligibility. He appeared on 323 of the 349 valid ballots submitted, becoming the sixth-overall highest vote percentage in the Hall's history at 92.6%.

Later that month, Suzuki was elected to the National Baseball Hall of Fame in his first year on the ballot, receiving 393 of a possible 394 votes, tying Derek Jeter for the second-highest vote share in history. He became the first Japanese and the first Asian-born player to be inducted into the Hall of Fame. Later that year, on July 27, Suzuki was officially inducted into the Hall of Fame in a ceremony at Cooperstown, New York.

The Mariners retired Suzuki's uniform number 51 in a pregame ceremony held on August 9, 2025. Because Suzuki wore the same jersey number as Hall of Famer Randy Johnson, the team announced plans to retire Johnson’s number 51 in May 2026. A statue of Suzuki in his batting stance was unveiled at T-Mobile Park in April 2026; the upright bat was accidentally broken during the unveiling.

== Personal life ==
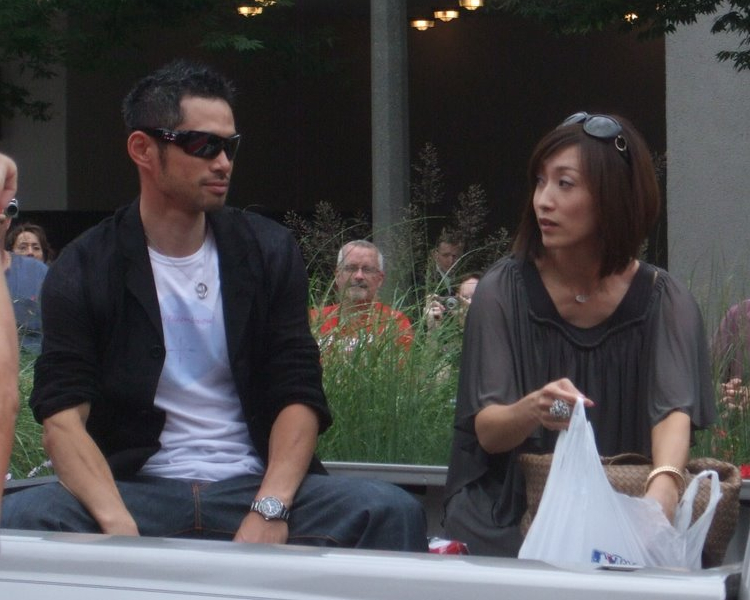
Suzuki (left) and his wife at the 2009 Red Carpet All-Star Parade

Suzuki married Yumiko Fukushima, a former TBS TV announcer, on December 3, 1999, at a small church in Santa Monica, California. As of 2025, they have a pet Shiba Inu dog named Ikkyu, a combination of the first character in each of their first names. They resided in Issaquah, Washington, during the seasons while he played in Seattle and in Greenwich, Connecticut, while he played for the Yankees. They resided in Miami Beach during his tenure with the Marlins.

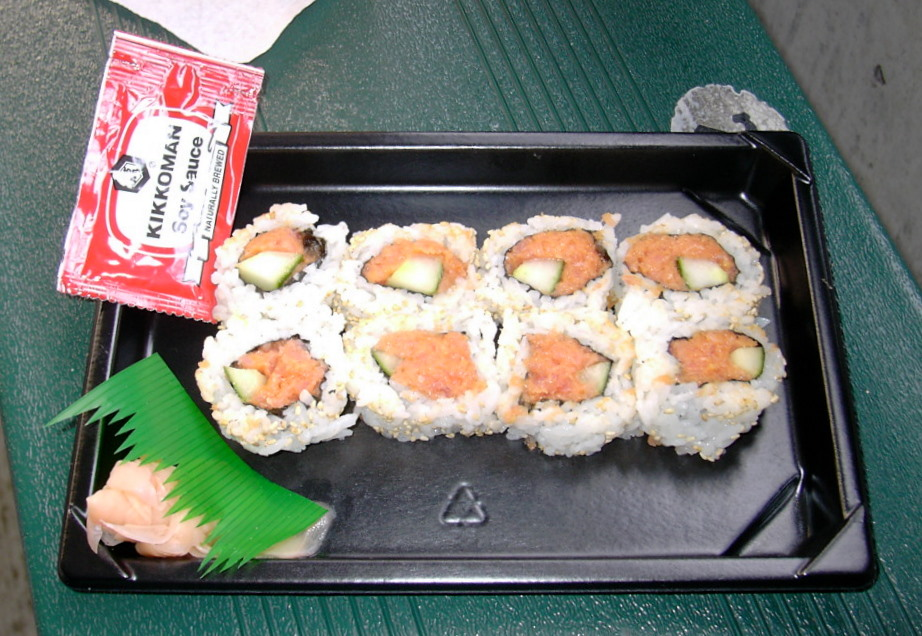
An older variation of the "Ichiroll", a menu item offered at T-Mobile Park named after Suzuki

On March 18, 2011, Suzuki donated ¥100 million ($1.25 million) to the Japanese Red Cross for earthquake and tsunami relief efforts.

Suzuki's father, Nobuyuki, handled Ichiro's finances early in his career until, in 2002, due to Nobuyuki underreporting his income, he was saddled with a significant bill for unpaid taxes. The scandal cost Suzuki an undisclosed amount of money and caused him embarrassment. This incident, along with Nobuyuki's relentless training and unforgiving attitude toward his son, caused their relationship to collapse. Subsequently, Suzuki's wife has looked after his finances. Suzuki has an older brother.

Since November 2000, Nobuyuki has run the Ichiro exhibition room named "I-fain" in Toyoyama, Suzuki's hometown. It exhibits a wide variety of Suzuki memorabilia, including personal items from his childhood and up-to-date baseball gear.

Suzuki is the honorary chairman of the Ichiro Cup, a six-month-long boys' league tournament with more than 200 teams, held in Toyoyama and surrounding cities and towns since 1996. Suzuki watches the final game and attends its awards ceremony every year.

Suzuki speaks English and often spoke it with his teammates in his playing days but uses an interpreter during interviews so that he is not misunderstood. He also learned Spanish early in his MLB career, using it to banter with other players. Suzuki further explains he did it because he felt a kinship to the Latin American players who, like him, were foreigners trying to succeed in the U.S.

When he first came to the United States, Suzuki especially enjoyed trips to Kansas City to talk with former Negro leagues star Buck O'Neil. When O'Neil died in 2006, Suzuki sent a very large memorial wreath to the funeral service. The following year, he visited the Negro Leagues Baseball Museum while on a road trip to Kansas City and made, as of 2016, the largest contribution ever made to the museum by an active MLB player.

=== Endorsements ===
Over the course of his career, Suzuki has endorsed numerous Japanese brands, although he was more reluctant to enter endorsement deals with American companies. According to Forbes, at one point in his career, Suzuki earned roughly $7 million annually from endorsements, most of which came from Japanese companies.

He was the face of Kirin Brewery, a Japanese beer brand. He has endorsed Japanese brands such as sporting goods company Mizuno Corporation, Nikko Cordial, NTT Communications, Asics, and ENEOS. Suzuki also endorsed Yunker energy drink, on behalf of Sato Pharmaceutical, and Oakley sunglasses.

In 2001, Suzuki had deals with the Cutter & Buck, Upper Deck trading cards, and sporting goods company Majestic Athletic.

Suzuki's agent Tony Attanasio stated that Suzuki had rejected around $40 million in endorsements due to him being "very selective when it comes to putting his name out in the public."

=== Media appearances and pop culture ===
Suzuki's agent, Tony Attanasio, described his client's status: "When you mail Ichiro something from the States, you only have to use that name on the address and he gets it [in Japan]. He's that big." Suzuki's status in Japan fueled interest in MLB in Japan, including the $275 million broadcasting rights deal between MLB and Dentsu in 2003.

In 2005, Suzuki played himself in Furuhata Ninzaburō, a Japanese Columbo-like TV drama that he loves. In the drama, he kills a person and is arrested.

Suzuki's likeness is used as the basis of the character "Kyoshiro" in the anime and manga Major.

In his rookie season with Seattle, Suzuki was featured in a hip-hop song recorded by Xola Malik and remixed by Sir Mix-A-Lot. When Suzuki was traded to the Yankees in July 2012, longtime Mariners fan Ben Gibbard (of Death Cab for Cutie) posted his tribute song, "Ichiro's Theme", on his SoundCloud page. The previous year, The Baseball Project had released the tribute song "Ichiro Goes To The Moon" on their album Volume 2: High and Inside, which Gibbard contributed backing vocals to. KIRO Radio's Dave Ross also wrote a tribute song to Suzuki, drawing inspiration from on The Barber of Seville.

== See also ==
- Satō–Suzuki Baseball Match
- Best Nine Award
- Commissioner's Historic Achievement Award
- Fielding Bible Award
- History of the Japanese in Seattle
- Japan Professional Sports Grand Prize
- List of Major League Baseball annual stolen base leaders
- List of Major League Baseball batting champions
- List of Major League Baseball career at-bat leaders
- List of Major League Baseball career games played leaders
- List of Major League Baseball career hits leaders
- List of Major League Baseball career plate appearance leaders
- List of Major League Baseball career putouts as a right fielder leaders
- List of Major League Baseball career runs scored leaders
- List of Major League Baseball career singles leaders
- List of Major League Baseball career stolen bases leaders
- List of Major League Baseball career total bases leaders
- List of Major League Baseball hit records
- List of Major League Baseball players from Japan
- Major League Baseball titles leaders
- Matsutaro Shoriki Award
- Mitsui Golden Glove Award
- Meikyukai
- Nippon Professional Baseball All-Star Series
- Players Choice Awards
- Seattle Mariners award winners and league leaders
- This Year in Baseball Awards

Awards and achievements
Preceded by Terrence Long	Players Choice AL Most Outstanding Rookie; 2001	Succeeded by Eric Hinske
Preceded by Alex Rodriguez	Players Choice AL Most Outstanding Player; 2004	Succeeded by David Ortiz
Preceded by Mark Teixeira	American League Player of the Month; August 2004	Succeeded by Vladimir Guerrero
Preceded by George Sisler	Single season base hit record holders 2004–present	Incumbent
