= List of Diolcogaster species =

This is a list of species of braconid wasps in the genus Diolcogaster.

== Diolcogaster species ==
- Diolcogaster abdominalis (Nees, 1834)
- Diolcogaster abengouroui (Risbec, 1951)
- Diolcogaster adiastola Saeed, Austin & Dangerfield, 1999
- Diolcogaster agama (de Saeger, 1944)
- Diolcogaster alce (Nixon, 1965)
- Diolcogaster alkingara Saeed, Austin & Dangerfield, 1999
- Diolcogaster alvearia (Fabricius, 1798)
- Diolcogaster ambositrensis (Granger, 1949)
- Diolcogaster anandra (de Saeger, 1944)
- Diolcogaster andamanensis Gupta & Fernandez-Triana, 2015
- Diolcogaster annulata (Granger, 1949)
- Diolcogaster anoma (Viereck, 1913)
- Diolcogaster ashmeadi Saeed, Austin & Dangerfield, 1999
- Diolcogaster aurangabadensis Fernandez-Triana, 2019
- Diolcogaster auripes (Provancher, 1886)
- Diolcogaster austrina (Wilkinson, 1929)
- Diolcogaster bakeri (Muesebeck, 1922)
- Diolcogaster bambeyi (Risbec, 1951)
- Diolcogaster basimacula (Cameron, 1905)
- Diolcogaster belokobylskiji Kotenko, 2007
- Diolcogaster bicolorina (Shenefelt, 1973)
- Diolcogaster bifurcifossa Zeng & Chen, 2011
- Diolcogaster brevicaudus (Provancher, 1886)
- Diolcogaster breviterebrus (Rao & Chalikwar, 1970)
- Diolcogaster brevivena Zeng & Chen, 2011
- Diolcogaster cariniger (Granger, 1949)
- Diolcogaster chaoi (Luo & You, 2003)
- Diolcogaster choi Whitfield & Salgado-Neto, 2020
- Diolcogaster cincticornis (de Saeger, 1944)
- Diolcogaster cingulata (Granger, 1949)
- Diolcogaster claritibia (Papp, 1959)
- Diolcogaster coenonymphae (Watanabe, 1937)
- Diolcogaster connexa (Nees, 1834)
- Diolcogaster coronata (de Saeger, 1944)
- Diolcogaster coxalis (de Saeger, 1944)
- Diolcogaster curticornis (Granger, 1949)
- Diolcogaster dichromus Saeed, Austin & Dangerfield, 1999
- Diolcogaster dipika (Bhatnagar, 1950)
- Diolcogaster duocolor Gupta & Fernandez-Triana, 2015
- Diolcogaster duris (Nixon, 1965)
- Diolcogaster earina (Wilkinson, 1929)
- Diolcogaster eclectes (Nixon, 1965)
- Diolcogaster epectina (de Saeger, 1944)
- Diolcogaster epectinopsis (de Saeger, 1944)
- Diolcogaster erro (Nixon, 1965)
- Diolcogaster euterpe (Nixon, 1965)
- Diolcogaster facetosa (Weed, 1888)
- Diolcogaster fasciipennis (Gahan, 1918)
- Diolcogaster flammea Salgado-Neto & Fernández-Triana, 2018
- Diolcogaster flavipes (Haliday, 1834)
- Diolcogaster galazia Kotenko, 2007
- Diolcogaster garmani (Ashmead, 1900)
- Diolcogaster gefidra Kotenko, 2007
- Diolcogaster glaphyra (de Saeger, 1944)
- Diolcogaster grammata Zeng & Chen, 2011
- Diolcogaster grangeri (Shenefelt, 1973)
- Diolcogaster hadrommata Saeed, Austin & Dangerfield, 1999
- Diolcogaster harrisi Saeed, Austin & Dangerfield, 1999
- Diolcogaster heterocera (de Saeger, 1944)
- Diolcogaster hinzi (Nixon, 1965)
- Diolcogaster homocera (de Saeger, 1944)
- Diolcogaster ichiroi Fernandez-Triana, 2018
- Diolcogaster indica (Wilkinson, 1927)
- Diolcogaster ineminens Zeng & Chen, 2011
- Diolcogaster insularis (Hedqvist, 1965)
- Diolcogaster integra (Wilkinson, 1929)
- Diolcogaster ippis (Nixon, 1965)
- Diolcogaster iqbali Saeed, Austin & Dangerfield, 1999
- Diolcogaster iridescens (Cresson, 1865)
- Diolcogaster kasachstanica (Tobias, 1964)
- Diolcogaster kasparyani Kotenko, 2007
- Diolcogaster kivuana (de Saeger, 1944)
- Diolcogaster laetimedia Zeng & Chen, 2011
- Diolcogaster lelaps (Nixon, 1965)
- Diolcogaster longistria Gupta & Fernandez-Triana, 2015
- Diolcogaster lucindae Saeed, Austin & Dangerfield, 1999
- Diolcogaster malabarensis Narendran & Sheeba, 2003
- Diolcogaster masoni Saeed, Austin & Dangerfield, 1999
- Diolcogaster mayae (Shestakov, 1932)
- Diolcogaster mediosulcata (Granger, 1949)
- Diolcogaster medon (Nixon, 1965)
- Diolcogaster megaulax (de Saeger, 1944)
- Diolcogaster mellea (Nixon, 1965)
- Diolcogaster merata Saeed, Austin & Dangerfield, 1999
- Diolcogaster miamensis Fernandez-Triana, 2018
- Diolcogaster minuta (Reinhard, 1880)
- Diolcogaster muzaffari Saeed, Austin & Dangerfield, 1999
- Diolcogaster narendrani Rema & Sheeba, 2004
- Diolcogaster naumanni Saeed, Austin & Dangerfield, 1999
- Diolcogaster neglecta (de Saeger, 1944)
- Diolcogaster nephele (Nixon, 1965)
- Diolcogaster newguineaensis Saeed, Austin & Dangerfield, 1999
- Diolcogaster nigromacula (de Saeger, 1944)
- Diolcogaster nixoni Saeed, Austin & Dangerfield, 1999
- Diolcogaster notopecktos Saeed, Austin & Dangerfield, 1999
- Diolcogaster orientalis (Rao & Chalikwar, 1970)
- Diolcogaster palpicolor (de Saeger, 1944)
- Diolcogaster periander (Nixon, 1965)
- Diolcogaster perniciosa (Wilkinson, 1929)
- Diolcogaster persimilis (Wilkinson, 1929)
- Diolcogaster plecopterae (Wilkinson, 1929)
- Diolcogaster pluriminitida Zeng & Chen, 2011
- Diolcogaster plutocongoensis (Shenefelt, 1973)
- Diolcogaster praritas Zeng & Chen, 2011
- Diolcogaster procris (Fischer, 1964)
- Diolcogaster psilocnema (de Saeger, 1944)
- Diolcogaster punctata (Rao & Chalikwar, 1976)
- Diolcogaster punctatiscutum Zeng & Chen, 2011
- Diolcogaster pyrene (Nixon, 1965)
- Diolcogaster reales (Nixon, 1965)
- Diolcogaster rixosa (Wilkinson, 1929)
- Diolcogaster robertsi Saeed, Austin & Dangerfield, 1999
- Diolcogaster rufithorax (Granger, 1949)
- Diolcogaster rufula Papp, 1991
- Diolcogaster rugosicoxa (Papp, 1959)
- Diolcogaster rugulosa (Rao & Chalikwar, 1970)
- Diolcogaster schizurae (Muesebeck, 1922)
- Diolcogaster scotica (Marshall, 1885)
- Diolcogaster semirufa (de Saeger, 1944)
- Diolcogaster seriphus (Nixon, 1965)
- Diolcogaster seyrigi (Granger, 1949)
- Diolcogaster solitaria Gupta & Fernandez-Triana, 2015
- Diolcogaster sons (Wilkinson, 1932)
- Diolcogaster spreta (Marshall, 1885)
- Diolcogaster stepposa (Tobias, 1964)
- Diolcogaster subtorquata (Granger, 1949)
- Diolcogaster sulcata (de Saeger, 1944)
- Diolcogaster tearae (Wilkinson, 1929)
- Diolcogaster tegularia (Papp, 1959)
- Diolcogaster tomentosae (Wilkinson, 1930)
- Diolcogaster torquatiger (Granger, 1949)
- Diolcogaster translucida Zeng & Chen, 2011
- Diolcogaster tristiculus (Granger, 1949)
- Diolcogaster tropicalus Saeed, Austin & Dangerfield, 1999
- Diolcogaster turneri (Wilkinson, 1929)
- Diolcogaster urios (Nixon, 1965)
- Diolcogaster vulcana (de Saeger, 1944)
- Diolcogaster vulpina (Wilkinson, 1929)
- Diolcogaster walkerae Saeed, Austin & Dangerfield, 1999
- Diolcogaster wittei (de Saeger, 1944)
- Diolcogaster xanthaspis (Ashmead, 1900)
- Diolcogaster yousufi Saeed, Austin & Dangerfield, 1999
- Diolcogaster joanesi Salgado-Neto & Santos, 2024
