= List of Major League Baseball career singles leaders =

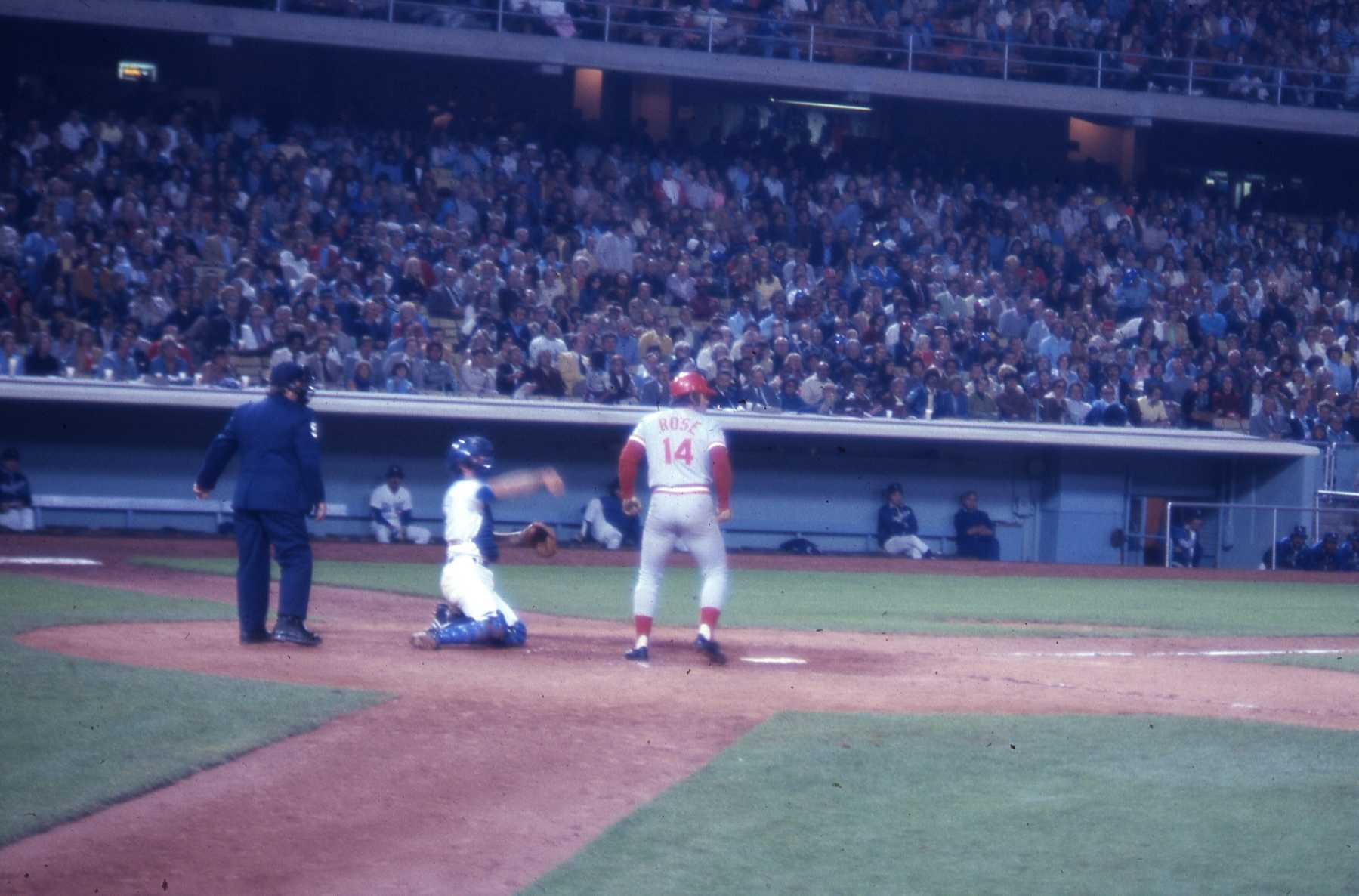
Pete Rose, the all-time leader in singles

In baseball, a single is the most common type of base hit, accomplished through the act of a batter safely reaching first base by hitting a fair ball (thus becoming a runner) and getting to first base before a fielder puts him out. As an exception, a batter-runner reaching first base safely is not credited with a single when an infielder attempts to put out another runner on the first play; this is one type of a fielder's choice. Also, a batter-runner reaching first base on a play due to a fielder's error trying to put him out at first base or another runner out (as a fielder's choice) is not credited with a single.

On a single hit to the outfield, any runners on second base or third base normally score, and sometimes the runner from the first base can advance to third base. Depending on the location of the hit, a quick recovery by the outfielder can prevent such an advance or create a play on the advancing runner.

Pete Rose is the all-time leader in singles with 3,215. Ty Cobb (3,053) is the only other player in MLB history with over 3,000 career singles.

As of September 27, 2026, no active players are in the top 100 of career singles. The active leader is Jose Altuve, tied for 108th all time with 1,735 singles.

== Key ==
**Rank**	Rank amongst leaders in career singles. A blank field indicates a tie.
**Player (2026 1Bs)**	Number of singles hit during the 2026 Major League Baseball season.
**1B**	Total career singles hit.
*	Denotes elected to National Baseball Hall of Fame.
**Bold**	Denotes active player. (Note: A player is considered inactive if he has announced his retirement or not played for a full season.)

== List ==
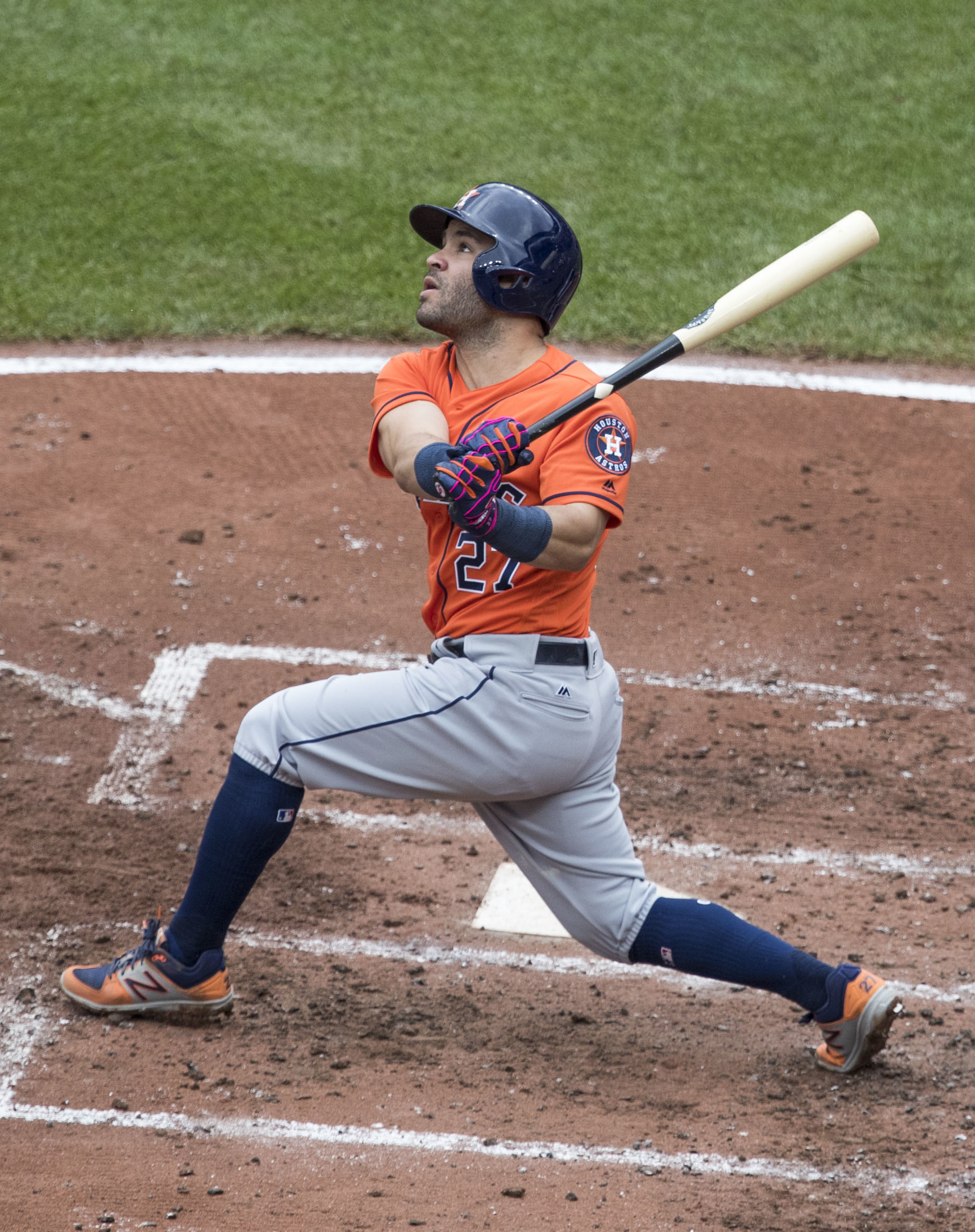
Jose Altuve, the active leader and tied for 108th all-time in career singles.

- Stats updated as of September 27, 2026.

Rank	Player (2026 1Bs)	1B
1	Pete Rose	3,215
2	Ty Cobb*	3,053
3	Eddie Collins*	2,643
4	Cap Anson*	2,614
5	Derek Jeter*	2,595
6	Ichiro Suzuki*	2,514
7	Willie Keeler*	2,513
8	Honus Wagner*	2,424
9	Rod Carew*	2,404
10	Tris Speaker*	2,383
11	Tony Gwynn*	2,378
12	Paul Molitor*	2,366
13	Nap Lajoie*	2,341
14	Hank Aaron*	2,294
15	Jesse Burkett*	2,273
16	Sam Rice*	2,271
17	Omar Vizquel	2,264
18	Carl Yastrzemski*	2,262
19	Wade Boggs*	2,253
	Stan Musial*	2,253
21	Lou Brock*	2,247
22	Paul Waner*	2,243
23	Rickey Henderson*	2,182
	Robin Yount*	2,182
25	Frankie Frisch*	2,171
26	Doc Cramer	2,163
27	Luke Appling*	2,162
28	Nellie Fox*	2,161
29	Eddie Murray*	2,156
30	Roberto Clemente*	2,154
31	Jake Beckley*	2,130
32	George Sisler*	2,121
33	Richie Ashburn*	2,119
34	Luis Aparicio*	2,108
35	Cal Ripken Jr.*	2,106
36	Zack Wheat*	2,104
37	Sam Crawford*	2,097
38	Lave Cross	2,056
39	Craig Biggio*	2,046
40	George Brett*	2,035
	Al Kaline*	2,035
42	Lloyd Waner*	2,033
43	Fred Clarke*	2,030
	Brooks Robinson*	2,030
45	George Van Haltren	2,028
46	Rabbit Maranville*	2,020
47	Miguel Cabrera	2,019
48	Max Carey*	2,017
	Dave Winfield*	2,017
50	Adrián Beltré*	2,015

Rank	Player (2026 1Bs)	1B
51	Bill Buckner	1,994
52	Albert Pujols	1,979
53	George Davis*	1,976
54	Stuffy McInnis	1,972
55	Willie Mays*	1,967
56	Ozzie Smith*	1,961
57	Jim O'Rourke*	1,960
58	Patsy Donovan	1,957
59	Julio Franco	1,952
60	Harold Baines*	1,945
61	Charlie Gehringer*	1,935
62	Al Simmons*	1,932
63	Roberto Alomar*	1,930
64	Rogers Hornsby*	1,919
65	Al Oliver	1,918
66	Brett Butler	1,913
67	Iván Rodríguez*	1,910
68	Johnny Damon	1,903
69	Tim Raines*	1,892
70	Vada Pinson	1,889
71	Rusty Staub	1,878
72	Maury Wills	1,866
73	Fred Tenney	1,862
74	Red Schoendienst*	1,860
75	Jake Daubert	1,855
76	Juan Pierre	1,850
77	Willie Davis	1,846
78	Steve Garvey	1,844
79	Harry Hooper*	1,842
80	Alex Rodriguez	1,840
81	Buddy Bell	1,832
82	Rafael Palmeiro	1,828
83	Pie Traynor*	1,823
84	Larry Bowa	1,815
85	Goose Goslin*	1,814
86	Mel Ott*	1,805
87	Bill Dahlen	1,801
88	Kenny Lofton	1,799
89	Dave Concepción	1,788
	Ed Delahanty*	1,788
91	Billy Hamilton*	1,787
	Edd Roush*	1,787
	Jimmy Ryan	1,787
94	Harry Heilmann*	1,784
95	Tommy Corcoran	1,781
96	Willie Randolph	1,775
97	Dave Parker*	1,772
98	Bert Campaneris	1,771
99	Tony Pérez*	1,769
100	Heinie Manush*	1,763
	Billy Williams*	1,763
