= Diolcogaster ichiroi =

Scientific classification
- Domain: Eukaryota
- Kingdom: Animalia
- Phylum: Arthropoda
- Class: Insecta
- Order: Hymenoptera
- Family: Braconidae
- Genus: Diolcogaster
- Species: D. ichiroi

Binomial name
- Diolcogaster ichiroi Fernandez-Triana, 2018

Species of wasp

Diolcogaster ichiroi is a species of parasitoid wasps within the family Braconidae. The species name was chosen in reference to Ichiro Suzuki, a professional baseball player. The species has only been collected at the Archbold Biological Station in Highlands County, Florida and the true extent of its range is not known.
