= Yunker =

Health tonic

Yunker Kotei Eki (ユンケル黄帝液, Yunkeru Kotei Eki), is a health tonic similar to Lipovitan and produced by the Sato Pharmaceutical Corporation in Japan. It was first produced in 1967, and is widely available at drug stores throughout Japan. Yunker contains Chinese herbal ingredients and caffeine and is marketed to the Japanese workforce to combat fatigue.

It is one of 33 tonics manufactured by Sato for a range of ailments related to fatigue. The Yunker line of tonics is also sold in the U.S., Europe and Singapore, but the contents of some tonics have been altered to meet domestic regulations.

A USDA report from 2002 reported that exports of Yunkeru Kotei-eki to six countries including the United States, Germany, Canada and Singapore were continuing to grow, and that Sato planned to start exports to Thailand later that year.

== Ingredients ==
Yunker Kotei contains the following ingredients (quantities are quoted per 30ml daily dose):

- sugars: 7g
- vitamin E: 10 IU
- Thiamin: 4.2 mg
- Riboflavin: 3.8 mg
- Vitamin B_{6}: 5.0 mg
- Vitamin B_{12}: 2.0μg
- Niacin: 10 mg
- Sodium: 30 mg
- Royal jelly: 100 mg
- Barrenwort Fluid Extract (Leaf) 100 mg
- Cnidium Fluid Extract (Fruit) 100 mg
- Asian Ginseng Extract (Root) 10 mg
- Hawthorn Berry Extract (Fruit) 3 mg
- Viper Tincture 100 mg
- Civet Tincture 100 mg

== See also ==
- Energy drink
- Lipovitan
