= Spicy tuna roll =

Sushi roll

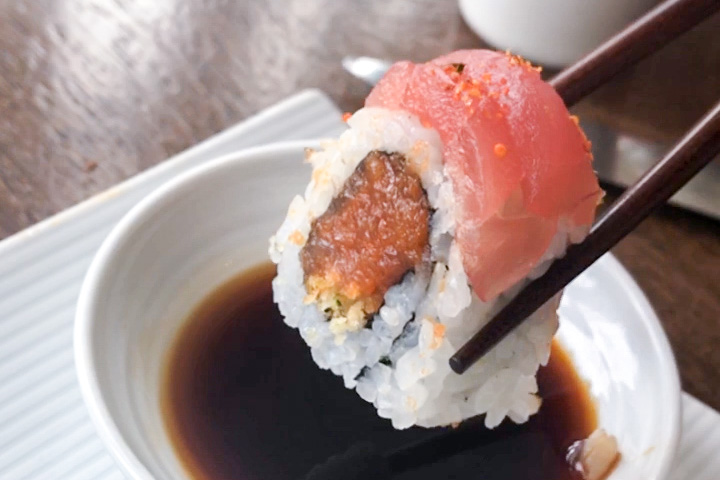
- a spicy tuna roll
- Type: Sushi
- Course: Main course
- Place of origin: Los Angeles, California, United States
- Associated cuisine: Japan
- Main ingredients: Nori, rice, tuna, and spicy mayo or sriracha

A spicy tuna roll is a makizushi roll that usually contains raw tuna, and spicy mayo or sriracha. The roll is often seasoned with Ichimi togarashi (ground red chile powder). The roll was invented in Los Angeles, California in the 1980s and is one of the more popular sushi rolls in the United States.

== History ==
The spicy tuna roll was invented in Los Angeles during the 1980s by Jean Nakayama of Maneki restaurant. She invented it by mixing tuna scraps with chilli sauce and rolling that into sushi with sheets of nori and sushi rice. It is similar to negitoro, a kind of raw tuna filling made with scrapings from bones and other parts of the tuna with very little meat. The main difference between negitoro and spicy tuna roll filling is that negitoro includes scallions and is not spicy. The dish has subsequently become very popular in the United States.
