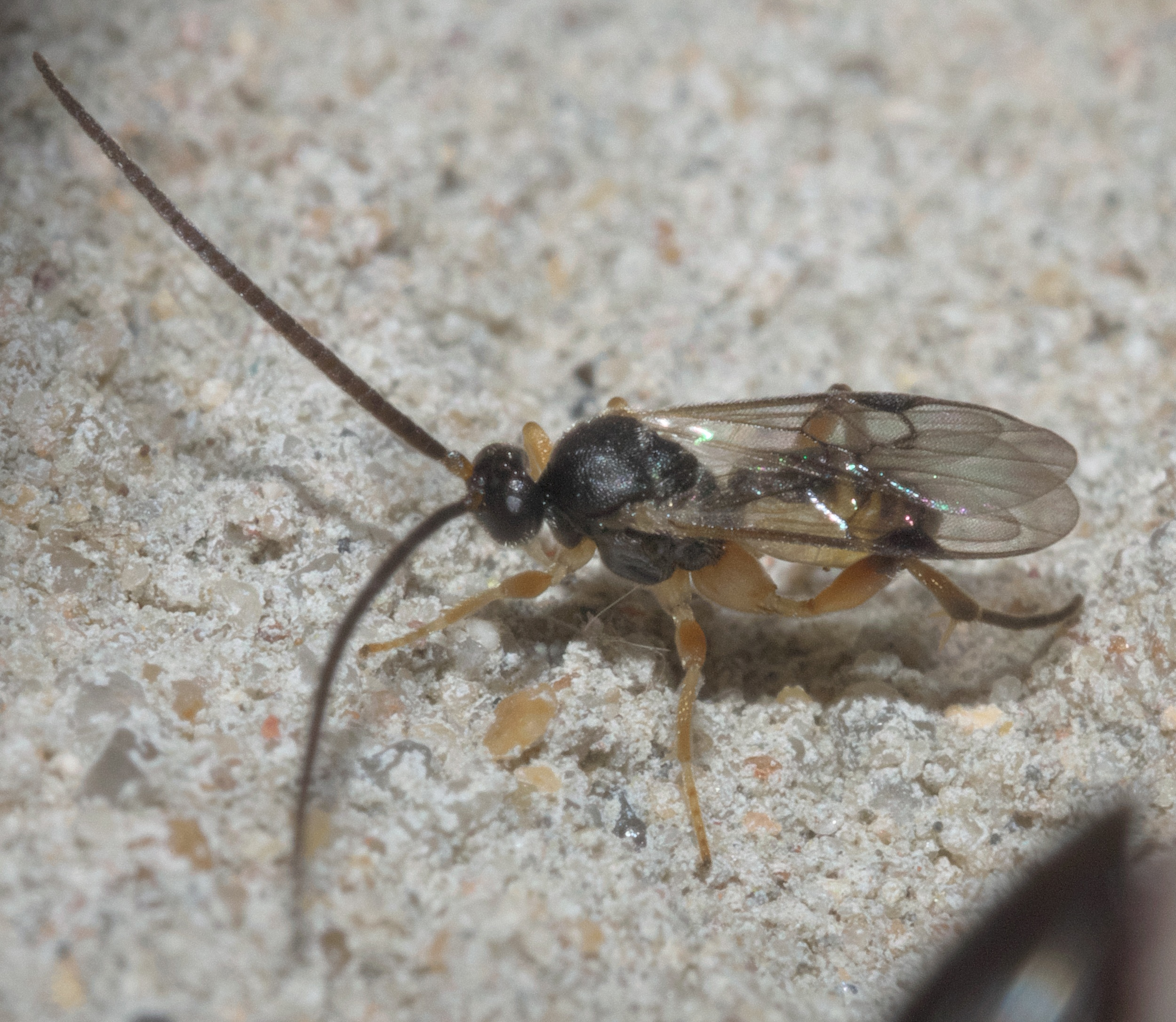

Scientific classification
- Domain: Eukaryota
- Kingdom: Animalia
- Phylum: Arthropoda
- Class: Insecta
- Order: Hymenoptera
- Family: Braconidae
- Subfamily: Microgastrinae
- Genus: Diolcogaster; Ashmead, 1900

Diversity
- At least 140 species

= Diolcogaster =

Genus of wasps

Diolcogaster is a genus of parasitoid wasps within the subfamily Microgastrinae of the family Braconidae. The genus is poorly studied, likely with multiple undescribed species. The type species is Diolcogaster melligaster (Provancher, 1886), formerly Microgaster melligaster. Species in this genus parasitize lepidopterans and are geographically widespread. There are more than 140 described species in Diolcogaster found throughout the world.

== See also ==
- List of Diolcogaster species
