= Sato Pharmaceutical =

Japanese pharmaceutical company

Coordinates: 49.186805°N 123.107211°W

Sato Pharmaceutical Co., Ltd.
- Native name: 佐藤製薬株式会社
- Company type: Private (K.K)
- Industry: Pharmaceuticals
- Founded: August 1, 1939; 86 years ago
- Founder: Yukichi Sato
- Headquarters: Moto-Akasaka, Minato, Tokyo 107-0051, Japan
- Area served: Worldwide
- Key people: Seiichi Sato (President and CEO)
- Products: Pharmaceuticals
- Number of employees: 1,000
- Website: Official website

Sato Pharmaceutical Co., Ltd. (佐藤製薬株式会社, Satō Seiyaku Kabushiki-gaisha) is a Japanese pharmaceutical company. Sato Pharmaceutical's main focus is on over-the-counter medicines. The company's products are sold in 14 countries around the world. The company's customer bases are located in Asia, North America and Europe, Taiwan, Hong Kong, Singapore, the US, Canada and Germany.

The company is known for its marketing mascots, Sato-chan and Satoko-chan, a pair of Indian elephant siblings, first introduced in 1959.

== Subsidiaries ==
Scarmerk Japan (partner Pfizer and Scarmerk Group (Germany))
