= Choeras =

Scientific classification
- Kingdom: Animalia
- Phylum: Arthropoda
- Class: Insecta
- Order: Hymenoptera
- Family: Braconidae
- Subfamily: Microgastrinae
- Genus: Choeras; Mason, 1981

Genus of wasps

Choeras is a genus of wasp in the family Braconidae, which was first described in 1981 by W.R.M Mason. There are at least 80 described species in Choeras, found worldwide.

== Species ==
These 80 species belong to the genus Choeras:

- Choeras achterbergi Narendran, 1998
- Choeras adjunctus (Nees, 1834)
- Choeras afrotropicalis Fernandez-Triana & van Achterberg, 2017
- Choeras almus (Tobias & Kotenko, 1984)
- Choeras angustus Song & Chen, 2014
- Choeras aper (Nixon, 1965)
- Choeras apo (Wilkinson, 1929)
- Choeras apollion (Nixon, 1965)
- Choeras arene (Nixon, 1973)
- Choeras avus (Tobias & Kotenko, 1984)
- Choeras batrachedrae (Kotenko, 1992)
- Choeras botydis (Wilkinson, 1930)
- Choeras brevinervus Song & Chen, 2014
- Choeras bushblitz Fagan-Jeffries & Austin, 2019
- Choeras calacte (Nixon, 1965)
- Choeras ceto (Nixon, 1965)
- Choeras ciscaucasicus (Tobias, 1971)
- Choeras compressifemur Chen & Song, 2004
- Choeras consimilis (Viereck, 1911)
- Choeras daphne (Nixon, 1965)
- Choeras dissors (Nixon, 1965)
- Choeras dorsalis (Spinola, 1808)
- Choeras epaphus (Nixon, 1965)
- Choeras flavicorpus Song & Chen, 2014
- Choeras fomes (Nixon, 1965)
- Choeras formosus Abdoli & Fernandez-Triana, 2019
- Choeras fujianensis Song & Chen, 2014
- Choeras fulviventris Fernandez-Triana & Abdoli, 2019
- Choeras gerontius (Nixon, 1965)
- Choeras gielisi van Achterberg, 2002
- Choeras gnarus (Tobias & Kotenko, 1984)
- Choeras grammatitergitus Song & Chen, 2014
- Choeras helespas Walker, 1996
- Choeras helle (Nixon, 1965)
- Choeras infirmicarinatus Song & Chen, 2014
- Choeras insignis (Muesebeck, 1938)
- Choeras irates (Nixon, 1965)
- Choeras koalascatocola Fagan-Jeffries & Austin, 2017
- Choeras libanius (Nixon, 1965)
- Choeras longiterebrus (Rao & Chalikwar, 1976)
- Choeras longitergitus Song & Chen, 2014
- Choeras longus Song & Chen, 2014
- Choeras loretta (Nixon, 1965)
- Choeras morialta Fagan-Jeffries & Austin, 2017
- Choeras nephta (Nixon, 1965)
- Choeras papua (Wilkinson, 1936)
- Choeras parabolus Kotenko, 2007
- Choeras parasitellae (Bouché, 1834)
- Choeras parasonium Kotenko, 2007
- Choeras parviocellus Song & Chen, 2014
- Choeras parvoculus Fagan-Jeffries & Austin, 2019
- Choeras psarae (Wilkinson, 1927)
- Choeras qazviniensis Fernandez-Triana & Talebi, 2019
- Choeras recusans (Walker, 1860)
- Choeras ruficornis (Nees, 1834)
- Choeras rugulosus Song & Chen, 2014
- Choeras semele (Nixon, 1965)
- Choeras semilunatus Song & Chen, 2014
- Choeras semirugosus Song & Chen, 2014
- Choeras sordidus (Ashmead, 1900)
- Choeras stenoterga (de Saeger, 1944)
- Choeras superbus (de Saeger, 1944)
- Choeras sylleptae (de Saeger, 1942)
- Choeras taftanensis Ghafouri Moghaddam & van Achterberg, 2018
- Choeras takeuchii (Watanabe, 1937)
- Choeras tarasi Kotenko, 2007
- Choeras tedellae (Nixon, 1961)
- Choeras tegularis (Szépligeti, 1905)
- Choeras tenuialatus Song & Chen, 2014
- Choeras tiro (Reinhard, 1880)
- Choeras tumidus Song & Chen, 2014
- Choeras vacillatrix (Wilkinson, 1930)
- Choeras vacillatropsis (de Saeger, 1944)
- Choeras validicarinatus Song & Chen, 2014
- Choeras validus (Thomson, 1895)
- Choeras varicolor Song & Chen, 2014
- Choeras venilia (Nixon, 1965)
- Choeras yunnanensis Song & Chen, 2014
- Choeras zerovae Kotenko, 2007
- Choeras zygon Fagan-Jeffries & Austin, 2019
