= Choeras psarae =

Scientific classification
- Kingdom: Animalia
- Phylum: Arthropoda
- Class: Insecta
- Order: Hymenoptera
- Family: Braconidae
- Subfamily: Microgastrinae
- Genus: Choeras
- Species: C. psarae

Binomial name
- Choeras psarae (Wilkinson, 1927)

Synonyms
- Microgaster psarae Wilkinson, 1927; Apanteles psarae (Wilkinson,1927)

Species of wasp

Choeras psarae is a species of braconid wasp in the subfamily Microgastrinae of the family Braconidae. It was first described in 1927 by D.S. Wilkinson as Microgaster psarae. In 1981, Mason transferred the species to the ganus Choeras, a decision accepted by Fernandez-Triana et al, and Korean authorities.

In a later paper (1929), Wilkinson stated that the specimens used to describe the species in 1927 had been bred from the host moths Psara bipunctalis (collected in Kuala Lumpur) and Pilocrocis (Pachyzancla) aegrotalis (collected in Nilambur, Madras, India).

This species has been found in Malaysia, India, Thailand, on the Korean Peninsula, and also in Taiwan, and Sri Lanka.
