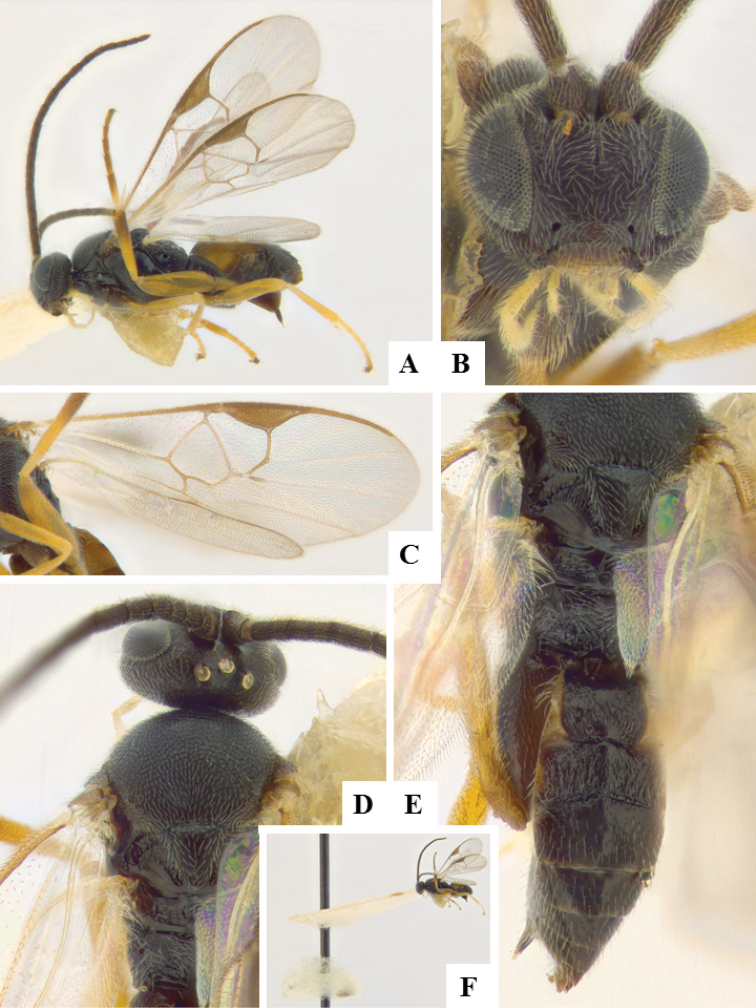
- Protapanteles phlyctaeniae, A. Habitus, B. Head, C. Wings, D. Head and mesosoma, E. Mesosoma (partially) and metasoma, F. Glued specimen and cocoon

Scientific classification
- Kingdom: Animalia
- Phylum: Arthropoda
- Class: Insecta
- Order: Hymenoptera
- Family: Braconidae
- Subfamily: Microgastrinae
- Genus: Protapanteles; Ashmead, 1898

= Protapanteles =

Genus of wasps

Protapanteles is a genus of wasp in the family Braconidae. There are more than 20 described species in Protapanteles, found mainly in the Holarctic.

== Species ==
These species belong to the genus Protapanteles:

- Protapanteles alaskensis Ashmead, 1902
- Protapanteles albigena Abdoli, Fernandez-Triana & Taleb 2021
- Protapanteles anchisiades (Nixon, 1973)
- Protapanteles andromica (Nixon, 1976)
- Protapanteles armeniacus (Tobias, 1976)
- Protapanteles buzurae (You, Xiong & Zhou, 1987)
- Protapanteles delitutus (Papp, 1984)
- Protapanteles endemus (Nixon, 1965)
- Protapanteles enephes (Nixon, 1965)
- Protapanteles hirtariae (Kotenko & Tobias, 1986)
- Protapanteles iapetus (Nixon, 1976)
- Protapanteles immunis (Haliday, 1834)
- Protapanteles incertus (Ruthe, 1859)
- Protapanteles lymantriae (Marsh, 1979)
- Protapanteles mandanis (Nixon, 1965)
- Protapanteles neparallelus Kotenko, 2007
- Protapanteles obliquae Wilkinson, 1928
- Protapanteles palabundus (Tobias, 1986)
- Protapanteles paleacritae (Riley, 1881)
- Protapanteles parallelus (Lyle, 1917)
- Protapanteles phigaliae (Muesebeck, 1919)
- Protapanteles phlyctaeniae (Muesebeck, 1929)
- Protapanteles popularis (Haliday, 1834)
- Protapanteles praecipuus Papp, 1993
- Protapanteles querceus (Tobias, 1986)
- Protapanteles santolinae Oltra, 1995
- Protapanteles triangulator (Wesmael, 1837)
- Protapanteles yunnanensis (You & Xiong, 1987)
