= Protapanteles palabundus =

Scientific classification
- Domain: Eukaryota
- Kingdom: Animalia
- Phylum: Arthropoda
- Class: Insecta
- Order: Hymenoptera
- Family: Braconidae
- Genus: Protapanteles
- Species: P. palabundus

Binomial name
- Protapanteles palabundus (Tobias, 1986)

Species of wasp

Protapanteles palabundus is a wasp belonging to the hymenopteran family Braconidae. The species was first described in 1986 by Tobias
