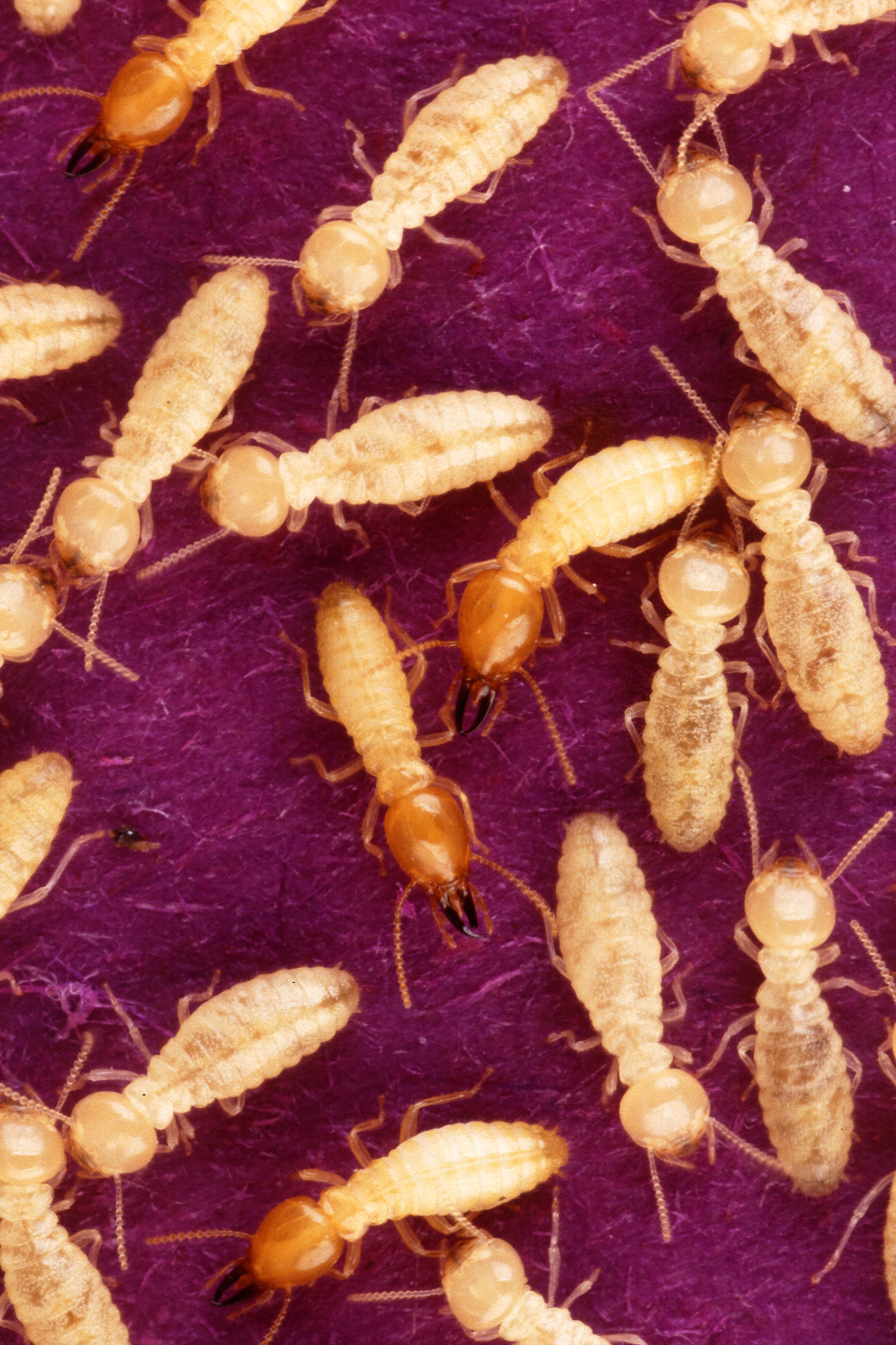
- Formosan subterranean termite (Coptotermes formosanus); Soldiers (red-coloured heads); Workers (pale-coloured heads)

Scientific classification
- Kingdom: Animalia
- Phylum: Arthropoda
- Clade: Pancrustacea
- Class: Insecta
- Cohort: Polyneoptera
- Superorder: Dictyoptera
- Order: Blattodea
- Infraorder: Isoptera; Brullé, 1832

Families
- † Cratomastotermitidae; Mastotermitidae; † Socialidae; † Pabuonqedidae; † Melqartitermitidae; † Mylacrotermitidae; † Krishnatermitidae; † Termopsidae; † Arceotermitidae; Stolotermitidae; Archotermopsidae; Hodotermopsidae; Hodotermitidae; Kalotermitidae; † Tanytermitidae; † Archeorhinotermitidae; Stylotermitidae; Serritermitidae; Rhinotermitidae; Termitogetonidae; Psammotermitidae; Heterotermitidae; Termitidae

= Termite =

Termite Temporal range: Late Jurassic – Recent

Social insects related to cockroaches

Termites are a group of eusocial insects which consume a variety of decaying plant material, generally in the form of wood, leaf litter, and soil humus. They are distinguished by their beaded (moniliform) antennae and the soft-bodied, unpigmented worker caste for which they have been commonly termed "white ants"; however, they are not ants but highly derived cockroaches; they are genetically closer to some cockroach groups than these are to other cockroaches. About 3,014 extant species are currently described, 2,138 of which are members of the family Termitidae.

Termites comprise the infraorder Isoptera, or alternatively the epifamily Termitoidae, within the order Blattodea (the cockroaches). Termites were once classified in a separate order from cockroaches, but phylogenetic studies in the 21st century indicate that they evolved from cockroaches, as they are deeply nested within the group (clade), and the sister group to wood-eating cockroaches of the genus Cryptocercus. Previous estimates suggested the divergence took place during the Jurassic or Triassic. More recent estimates suggest that they have an origin during the Late Jurassic, with later evidence revealing fossils from this time period.

Termite colonies are commonly described as superorganisms due to the collective behaviors of the individuals which form a self-governing entity: the colony itself. Their colonies range in size from a few hundred individuals to enormous societies with several million individuals in Mastotermitidae. Most species are rarely seen, having a cryptic life history where they remain hidden within the galleries and tunnels of their nests for most of their lives. Similar to ants, along with some bees and wasps of the order Hymenoptera, most termite colonies possess analogous "worker" and "soldier" castes consisting of mostly sterile individuals which are physically and behaviorally distinct from other castes. Unlike ants, most colonies begin from sexually mature individuals known as the "king" and "queen" that together form a lifelong monogamous pair. Also unlike ants, which undergo a complete metamorphosis, termites undergo an incomplete metamorphosis that proceeds through egg, nymph, and adult stages, as with other cockroaches.

Termites' success as a group has led to them colonizing almost every global landmass, with the highest diversity occurring in the tropics where they are estimated to constitute 10% of the animal biomass in some regions, particularly in Africa which has the richest diversity of more than 1000 described species. They are important decomposers of decaying plant matter in the subtropical and tropical regions of the world, and their recycling of wood and plant matter is of considerable ecological importance. Many species are ecosystem engineers capable of altering many soil properties such as hydrology, decomposition, nutrient cycling, plant growth, and consequently surrounding biodiversity through the large mounds constructed by certain species.

Termites have several impacts on humans, both positive and negative. They are a delicacy in the diet of some human cultures such as the Makiritare in the Alto Orinoco province of Venezuela, where they are commonly used as a spice. They are also used in traditional medicinal treatments of various diseases and ailments, such as influenza, asthma, bronchitis, and other ailments. Despite that the vast majority of termite species are innocuous, termites are perhaps most famous for being structural pests which infest structural timbers, with the regional numbers of economically significant species being: North America, 9; Australia, 16; Indian subcontinent, 26; tropical Africa, 24; Central America and the West Indies, 17. Of known pest species, 28 of the most invasive and structurally damaging belong to the genus Coptotermes. The distribution of most known pest species is expected to increase over time as a consequence of climate change. Increased urbanization and connectivity is also predicted to expand the range of some pest termites.

== Etymology ==
The infraorder name Isoptera is derived from the Greek words ἴσος (iso, meaning equal) and πτερόν (ptera, meaning winged), which refer to the nearly equal size of the fore and hind wings. "Termite" derives from the Latin and Late Latin word termes ("woodworm, white ant"), altered by the influence of Latin terere ("to rub, wear, erode") from the earlier word tarmes. A termite nest is also known as a termitary or termitarium (plural termitaria or termitariums). The word was first used in English in 1781. Earlier attested designations were "wood ants" or "white ants".

== Taxonomy and evolutionary history ==
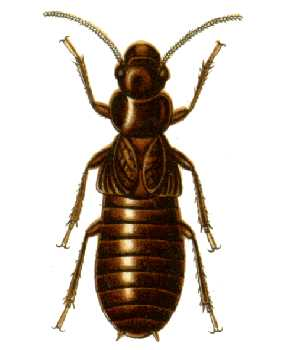
The external appearance of the giant northern termite Mastotermes darwiniensis is suggestive of the close relationship between termites and other cockroaches.

Termites were formerly placed in the order Isoptera. As early as 1925 suggestions were made that they were closely related to wood-eating cockroaches (genus Cryptocercus, the woodroach) based on the similarity of their symbiotic gut flagellates. In the 1960s additional evidence supporting that hypothesis emerged when F. A. McKittrick noted similar morphological characteristics between some termites and Cryptocercus nymphs. In 2008 DNA analysis from 16S rRNA sequences supported the position of termites being nested within the evolutionary tree containing the order Blattodea. The cockroach genus Cryptocercus shares the strongest phylogenetic relationship, and is considered to be the sister-group to termites. Termites and Cryptocercus share similar morphological and social features: for example, most cockroaches do not exhibit social characteristics, but Cryptocercus takes care of its young and exhibits other social behaviour such as trophallaxis and allogrooming. It had been proposed that the Isoptera and Cryptocercidae be grouped in the clade "Xylophagodea", but subsequent researchers have suggested a more conservative measure of retaining the termites as the Termitoidae, an epifamily within the cockroach order, which preserves the classification of termites at the family level and below. Termites have long been accepted as closely related to cockroaches and mantids, and they are classified in the same superorder (Dictyoptera).

Many of the oldest unambiguous termite fossils date to the early Cretaceous, but given the diversity of Cretaceous termites and early fossil records showing mutualism between microorganisms and these insects, they possibly originated earlier in the Jurassic or Triassic. Supporting this, the genus Sociala (a stem-termite) was found in the Middle to Late Jurassic Karabastau Formation in 2024.

Further evidence of a Jurassic origin is the assumption that the extinct mammaliaform Fruitafossor from Morrison Formation consumed termites, judging from its morphological similarity to modern termite-eating mammals. Morrison Formation also yields social insect nest fossils close to that of termites. The oldest termite nest discovered is believed to be from the Upper Cretaceous in West Texas, where the oldest known faecal pellets were also discovered. Claims that termites emerged earlier have faced controversy. For example, Frances M. Weesner indicated that the Mastotermitidae termites may go back to the Late Permian, 251 million years ago, and fossil wings that have a close resemblance to the wings of Mastotermes of the Mastotermitidae, the most primitive living termite, have been discovered in the Permian layers in Kansas. It is even possible that the first termites emerged during the Carboniferous. The folded wings of the fossil wood roach Pycnoblattina, arranged in a convex pattern between segments 1a and 2a, resemble those seen in Mastotermes, the only living insect with the same pattern. Kumar Krishna et al., though, consider that all of the Paleozoic and Triassic insects tentatively classified as termites are in fact unrelated to termites and should be excluded from the Isoptera. Other studies suggest that the origin of termites is more recent, having diverged from Cryptocercus sometime during the Early Cretaceous.

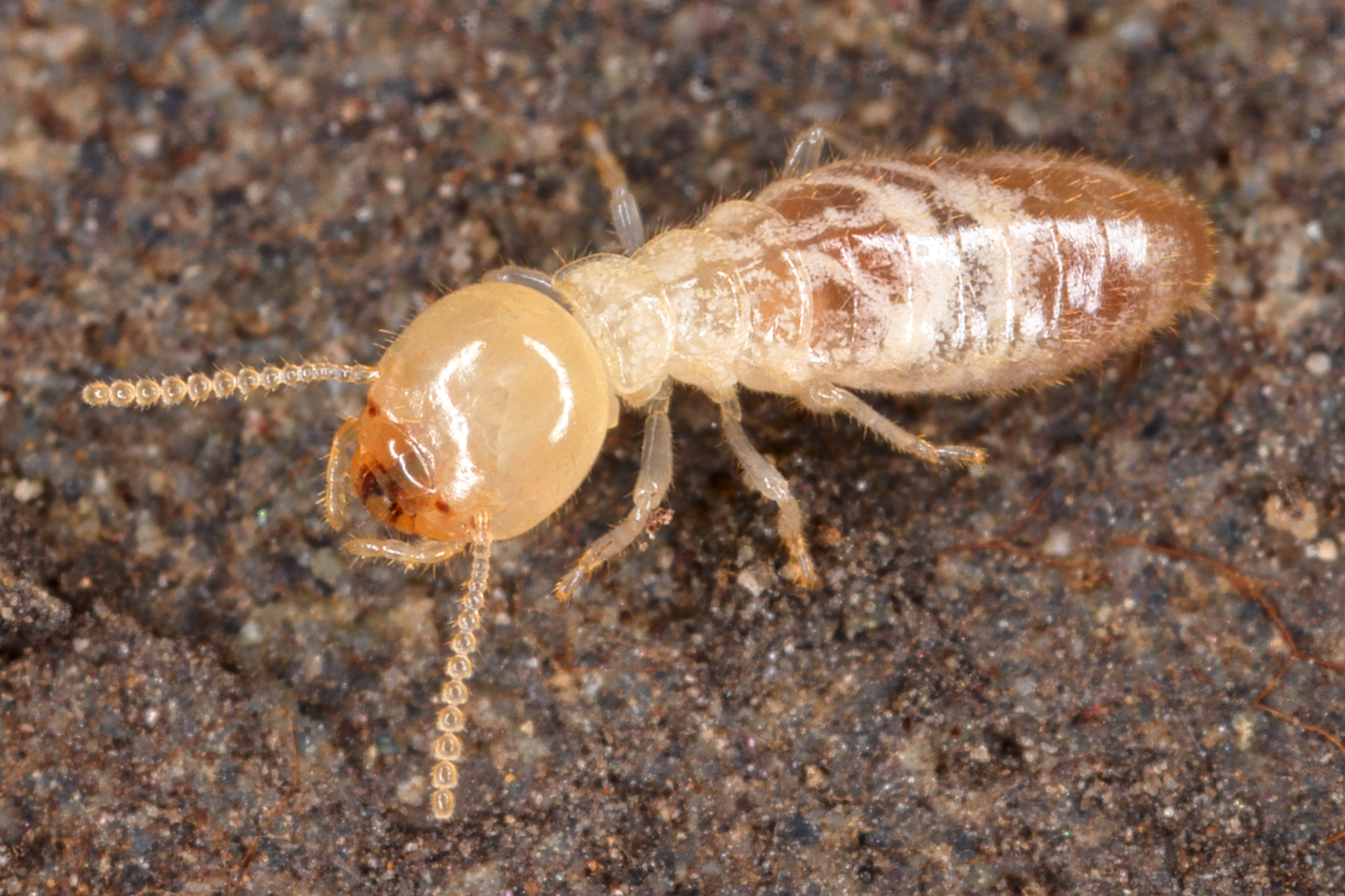
Macro image of a worker.

The primitive giant northern termite (Mastotermes darwiniensis) exhibits numerous basal characteristics similar to other cockroaches that are not shared with other termites, such as laying its eggs in rafts and having anal lobes on the wings. Termites are sometimes called "white ants", but the only resemblance to the ants is due to their sociality which is due to convergent evolution with termites being the first social insects to evolve a caste system more than 100 million years ago. Termite genomes are generally relatively large compared to those of other insects; the first fully sequenced termite genome, of Zootermopsis nevadensis, which was published in the journal Nature Communications, consists of roughly 500Mb, while two subsequently published genomes, Macrotermes natalensis and Cryptotermes secundus, are considerably larger at around 1.3Gb.

External phylogeny showing relationship of termites with other insect groups:

- Dictyoptera
  - Mantodea
    (Mantises)
  - Blattodea
    - Blaberoidea
    - Solumblattodea
      - Corydiodea
      - Blattoidea
        - Blattoidae
        - Kittrickea
          - Lamproblattidae
          - Xylophagodea (=Tutricablattae)
            - Cryptocercidae (brown-hooded cockroaches)
            - Isoptera (Termites)

Internal phylogeny showing relationship of extant termite families:

- Isoptera
  - Mastotermitidae
  - - Euisoptera
      - Teletisoptera
        - Stolotermitidae
        - - Archotermopsidae
          - - Hodotermopsidae
            - Hodotermitidae
      - Icoisoptera
        - Kalotermitidae
        - - Neoisoptera
            - Stylotermitidae
            - - - Serritermitidae
                - Rhinotermitidae
              - - Termitogetonidae
                - - Psammotermitidae
                  - - Geoisoptera
                      - Heterotermitidae
                      - Termitidae

There are currently 3,173 living and fossil termite species recognised, classified in 12 families; reproductive and/or soldier castes are usually required for identification. The infraorder Isoptera is divided into the following clade and family groups, showing the subfamilies in their respective classification:

=== Early-diverging termite families ===
Infraorder Isoptera Brullé, 1832

Family †Cratomastotermitidae Engel, Grimaldi, & Krishna, 2009
Family Mastotermitidae Desneux, 1904

Parvorder Euisoptera Engel, Grimaldi, & Krishna, 2009

Family †Melqartitermitidae Engel, 2021
Family †Mylacrotermitidae Engel, 2021
Family †Krishnatermitidae Engel, 2021
Family †Termopsidae Holmgren, 1911
Family †Carinatermitidae Krishna & Grimaldi, 2000

Minorder Teletisoptera Barden & Engel, 2021

Family Archotermopsidae Engel, Grimaldi, & Krishna, 2009
Family Hodotermitidae Desneux, 1904
Family Hodotermopsidae Engel, 2021

subfamily †Hodotermopsellinae Engel & Jouault, 2024
subfamily Hodotermopsinae Engel, 2021

Family †Arceotermitidae Engel, 2021

subfamily †Arceotermitinae Engel, 2021
subfamily †Cosmotermitinae Engel, 2021

Family Stolotermitidae Holmgren, 1910

subfamily Stolotermitinae Holmgren, 1910
subfamily Porotermitinae Emerson, 1942

Minorder Artisoptera Engel, 2021

Family †Tanytermitidae Engel, 2021

Microrder Icoisoptera Engel, 2013

Family Kalotermitidae Froggatt, 1897

Nanorder Neoisoptera Engel, Grimaldi, & Krishna, 2009

see below for families and subfamilies:

=== Neoisoptera ===
The Neoisoptera, literally meaning "newer termites" (in an evolutionary sense), are a recently coined clade that include families such as the Heterotermitidae, Rhinotermitidae and Termitidae. Neoisopterans have a bifurcated caste development with true workers, and so notably lack pseudergates (except in Stylotermitidae: see below). All Neoisopterans have a fontanelle, which appears as a circular pore or series of pores in a depressed region within the middle of the head. The fontanelle connects to the frontal gland, a novel organ unique to Neoisopteran termites which evolved to excrete an array of defensive chemicals and secretions, and so is typically most developed in the soldier caste. Cellulose digestion in the family Termitidae has co-evolved with bacterial gut microbiota and many taxa have evolved additional symbiotic relationships such as with the fungus Termitomyces; in contrast, basal Neoisopterans and all other Euisoptera have flagellates and prokaryotes in their hindguts. Extant families and subfamilies are organized as follows:

Early-Diverging Neoisoptera (Non-Geoisoptera)

Family †Archeorhinotermitidae Krishna & Grimaldi, 2003
Family Stylotermitidae Holmgren & Holmgren, 1917
Family Serritermitidae Holmgren, 1910
Family Rhinotermitidae Froggatt, 1897
Family Termitogetonidae Holmgren, 1910
Family Psammotermitidae Holmgren, 1910

Subfamily Prorhinotermitinae Quennedey & Deligne, 1975
Subfamily Psammotermitinae Holmgren, 1910

Clade Geoisoptera Engel, Hellemans, & Bourguignon, 2024

Family Heterotermitidae Froggatt, 1897 (=Coptotermitinae Holmgren, 1910)

Family Termitidae Latreille, 1802

Subfamily Sphaerotermitinae Engel & Krishna, 2004
Subfamily Macrotermitinae Kemner, 1934, nomen protectum [ICZN 2003]
Subfamily Foraminitermitinae Holmgren, 1912
Subfamily Apicotermitinae Grassé & Noirot, 1954 [1955]
Subfamily Microcerotermitinae Holmgren, 1910
Subfamily Syntermitinae Engel & Krishna, 2004
Subfamily Forficulitermitinae Hellemans, Engel, & Bourguignon, 2024
Subfamily Engelitermitinae Romero Arias, Roisin, & Scheffrahn, 2024
Subfamily Crepititermitinae Hellemans, Engel, & Bourguignon, 2024
Subfamily Protohamitermitinae Hellemans, Engel, & Bourguignon, 2024
Subfamily Cylindrotermitinae Hellemans, Engel, & Bourguignon, 2024
Subfamily Neocapritermitinae Hellemans, Engel, & Bourguignon, 2024
Subfamily Nasutitermitinae Hare, 1937
Subfamily Promirotermitinae Hellemans, Engel, & Bourguignon, 2024
Subfamily Mirocapritermitinae Kemner, 1934
Subfamily Amitermitinae Kemner, 1934
Subfamily Cubitermitinae Weidner, 1956
Subfamily Termitinae Latreille, 1802

== Distribution and diversity ==
Termites are found on all continents except Antarctica. The diversity of termite species is low in North America and Europe (10 species known in Europe and 50 in North America), but is high in South America, where over 400 species are known. Of the 3,014 extant termite species currently classified, 754 are found in Africa, where mounds are extremely abundant in savannas, as islands of soil fertility. Approximately 1.1 million active termite mounds can be found in the northern Kruger National Park alone. In Asia, there are 1164 species of termites, with 488 species in China. Within China, termite species are restricted to mild tropical and subtropical habitats south of the Yangtze River. In Australia, all ecological groups of termites (dampwood, drywood, subterranean) are endemic to the country, with over 360 classified species. Because termites are highly social and abundant, they represent a disproportionate amount of the world's insect biomass. Termites and ants comprise about 1% of insect species, but represent more than 50% of insect biomass.

Due to their soft cuticles, most termites do not inhabit cool or cold habitats. However, some termites having higher levels of trehalose, a cryoprotectant, are adapted to cold climates where they experience frost and snow. There are three ecological groups of termites: dampwood, drywood and subterranean. Dampwood termites are found only in coniferous forests, and drywood termites are found in hardwood forests; subterranean termites live in widely diverse areas. One species in the drywood group is the West Indian drywood termite (Cryptotermes brevis), which is an invasive species in Australia.

Diversity of Isoptera by continent:
	Asia	Africa	North America	South America	Europe	Australia
Estimated number of species	435	1,000	50	400	10	360

== Description ==
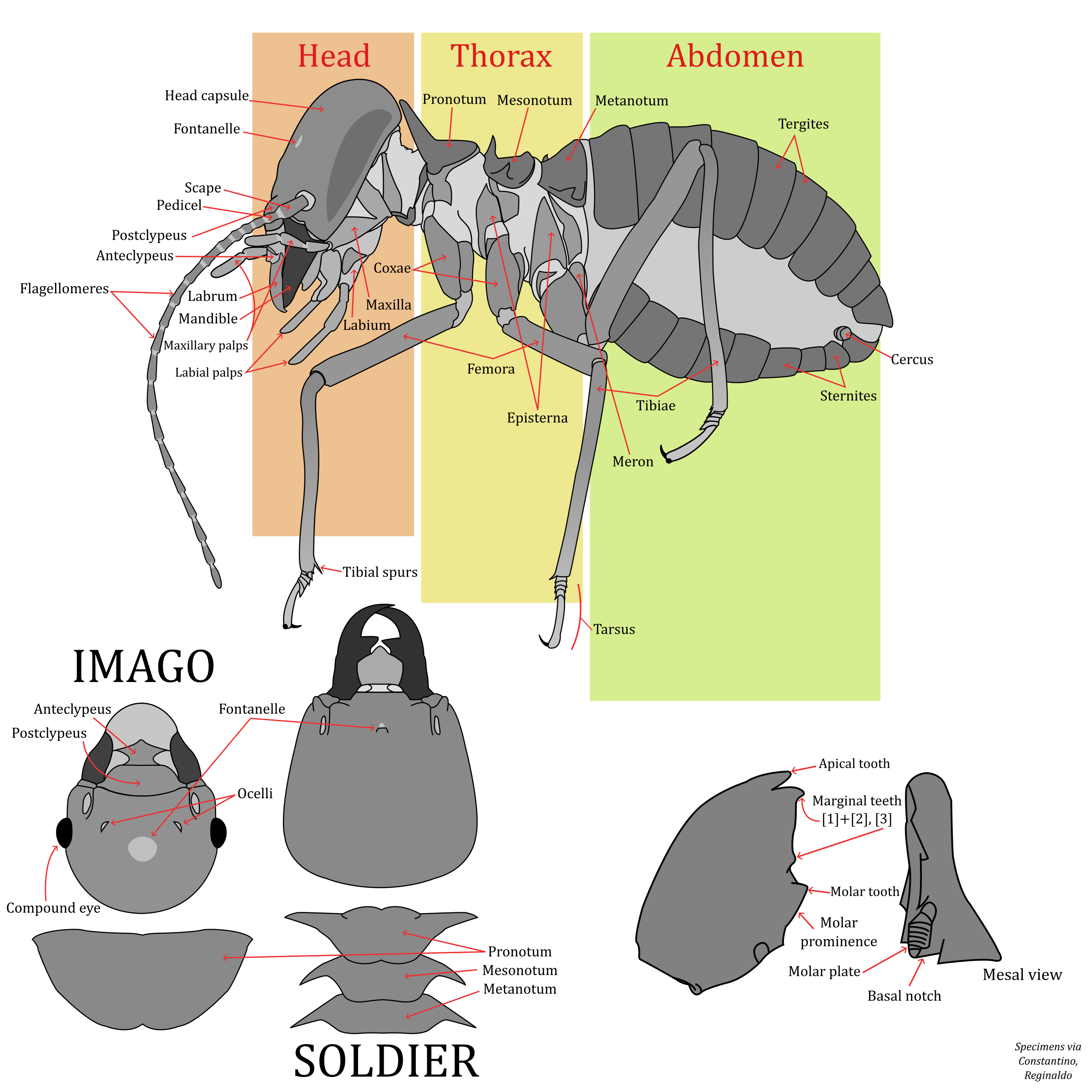
General anatomy of a worker termite with Imago (reproductive) and soldier visualized; note the reduction and fusion of sclerites on the thorax and more membranous body compared to other Dictyoptera. Mandible descriptive terminology on the bottom right. The fontanelle is absent in basal termites, being found only in Neoisopteran termites.

Termites are usually small, measuring between 4 and 15 millimetres (3/16 and 9/16 in) in length. The largest of all extant termites are the queens of the species Macrotermes bellicosus, measuring up to over 4.7 inches (12 cm) in length. Another giant termite, the extinct Gyatermes styriensis, flourished in Austria during the Miocene and had a wingspan of 76 millimetres (3 in) and a body length of 25 millimetres (1 in).

Most worker and soldier termites are completely blind as they do not have a pair of eyes. However, some species, such as Hodotermes mossambicus, have compound eyes which they use for orientation and to distinguish sunlight from moonlight. The alates (winged males and females) have eyes along with lateral ocelli. Lateral ocelli, however, are not found in all termites, being absent in the families Hodotermitidae, Termopsidae, and Archotermopsidae. Like other insects, termites have a small tongue-shaped labrum and a clypeus; the clypeus is divided into a postclypeus and anteclypeus. Termite antennae have a number of functions such as the sensing of touch, taste, odours (including pheromones), heat and vibration. The three basic segments of a termite antenna include a scape, a pedicel (typically shorter than the scape), and the flagellum (all segments beyond the scape and pedicel). The mouth parts contain a maxilla, a labium, and a set of mandibles. The maxilla and labium have palps that help termites sense food and handling. The cuticle of most castes is soft and flexible due to a lack of sclerotization, particularly of the abdomen which often appears translucent. Pigmentation and sclerotization of the cuticle correlates with life history, with species that spend more time on the surface in the open tending to have a more sclerotized and pigmented exoskeleton.

Consistent with all insects, the anatomy of the termite thorax consists of three segments: the prothorax, the mesothorax and the metathorax. Each segment contains a pair of legs. On alates, the wings are located at the mesothorax and metathorax, which is consistent with all four-winged insects. The mesothorax and metathorax have well-developed exoskeletal plates; the prothorax has smaller plates.

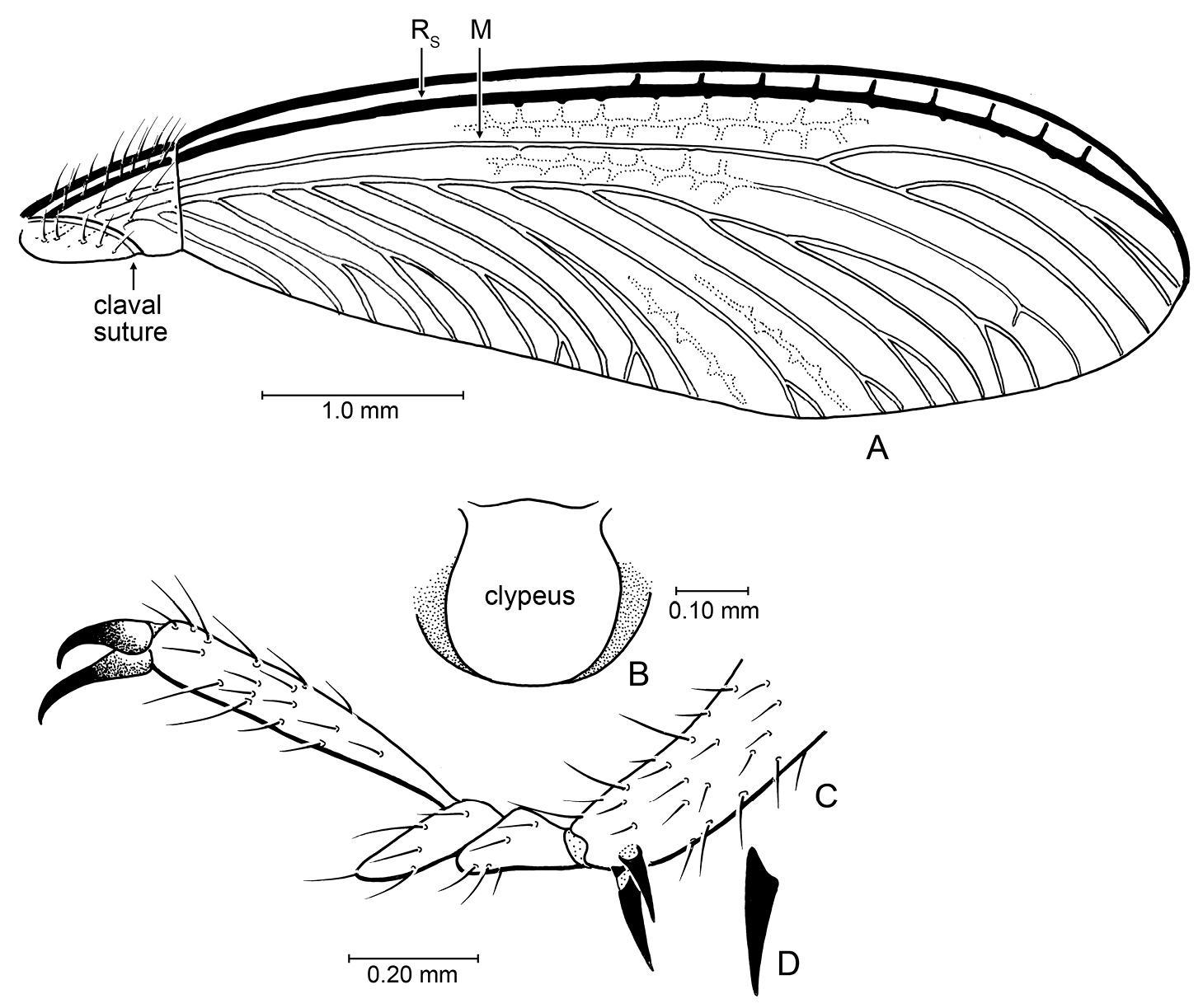
Diagram showing a wing, along with the clypeus and leg

Termites have a ten-segmented abdomen with two plates, the tergites and the sternites. The tenth abdominal segment has a pair of short cerci. There are ten tergites, of which nine are wide and one is elongated. The reproductive organs are similar to those in cockroaches but are more simplified. For example, the intromittent organ is not present in male alates, and the sperm is either immotile or aflagellate. However, Mastotermitidae termites have multiflagellate sperm with limited motility. The genitals in females are also simplified. Unlike in other termites, Mastotermitidae females have an ovipositor, a feature strikingly similar to that in female cockroaches.

The non-reproductive castes of termites are wingless and rely exclusively on their six legs for locomotion. The alates fly only for a brief amount of time, so they also rely on their legs. The appearance of the legs is similar in each caste, but the soldiers have larger and heavier legs. The structure of the legs is consistent with other insects: the parts of a leg include a coxa, trochanter, femur, tibia and the tarsus. The number of tibial spurs on an individual's leg varies. Some species of termite have an arolium, located between the claws, which is present in species that climb on smooth surfaces but is absent in most termites.

Unlike in ants, the hind-wings and fore-wings are of equal length. Most of the time, the alates are poor flyers; their technique is to launch themselves in the air and fly in a random direction. Studies show that in comparison to larger termites, smaller termites cannot fly long distances. When a termite is in flight, its wings remain at a right angle, and when the termite is at rest, its wings remain parallel to the body.

=== Caste system ===
Due to termites being hemimetabolous insects, where the young go through multiple and gradual adultoid moults before maturing, the advent of eusociality has significantly altered the developmental patterns of this group of insects which, although similar, are not homologous to that of the eusocial Hymenoptera. Unlike ants, bees, and wasps which undergo a complete metamorphosis and as a result only exhibit developmental plasticity at the larval stage, the mobile adultoid instars of termites remain developmentally flexible throughout all life stages up to the final molt, which has uniquely allowed for the evolution of distinct yet flexible castes amongst the immatures. As a result the caste system of termites consists mostly of neotenous or juvenile individuals that undertake the most labor in the colony, which is in contrast to the eusocial Hymenoptera where work is strictly undertaken by the adults.

The developmental plasticity in termites can be described similarly to cell potency, where each molt offers a varying level of phenotypic potency. Early instars typically exhibit the highest phenotypic potency and can be described as totipotent, able to molt into all alternative phenotypes. Following instars can be pluripotent, being able to molt into reproductives and non-reproductives but cannot molt into at least one phenotype. Multipotent instars are able to molt into either reproductive or non-reproductive phenotypes. Unipotent instars are able to molt into developmentally close phenotypes, and then the final instar is committed, being no longer able to change phenotype and so are functionally an adult. In most termites, phenotypic potency decreases with every successive molt. Notable exceptions are basal taxa such as the Archotermopsidae, which are able to retain high developmental plasticity even up to the late instars. In these basal taxa, the immatures are able to go through progressive (nymph-to-imago), regressive (winged-to-wingless) and stationary (size increase, remains wingless) molts, which typically indicate the developmental trajectory an individual follows.

There is significant variation of the developmental patterns in termites even across closely related taxa, but they can typically be generalized into the following two patterns: the first is the linear developmental pathway, where all immatures are capable of developing into winged adults (Alates), exhibit high phenotypic potency, and where there exists no true sterile caste other than the soldier. The second is the bifurcated developmental pathway, where immatures diverge into two distinct developmental lineages known as the nymphal (winged) and apterous (wingless) lines. The bifurcation occurs early, either at the egg or the first two instars, and represents an irreversible and committed development to either the reproductive or non-reproductive lifestyles. As such, the apterous lineage consists mostly of wingless and truly altruistic sterile individuals (true workers, soldiers), whereas the nymphal lineage consists mainly of fertile individuals destined to become winged reproductives. The bifurcated developmental pathway is found mainly in the derived taxa (i.e. Neoisoptera), and is believed to have evolved in tandem with the sterile worker caste as species moved to foraging for food beyond their nests, as opposed to the nest also being the food (such as in obligate wood-dwellers).

There are three main castes which are discussed below:

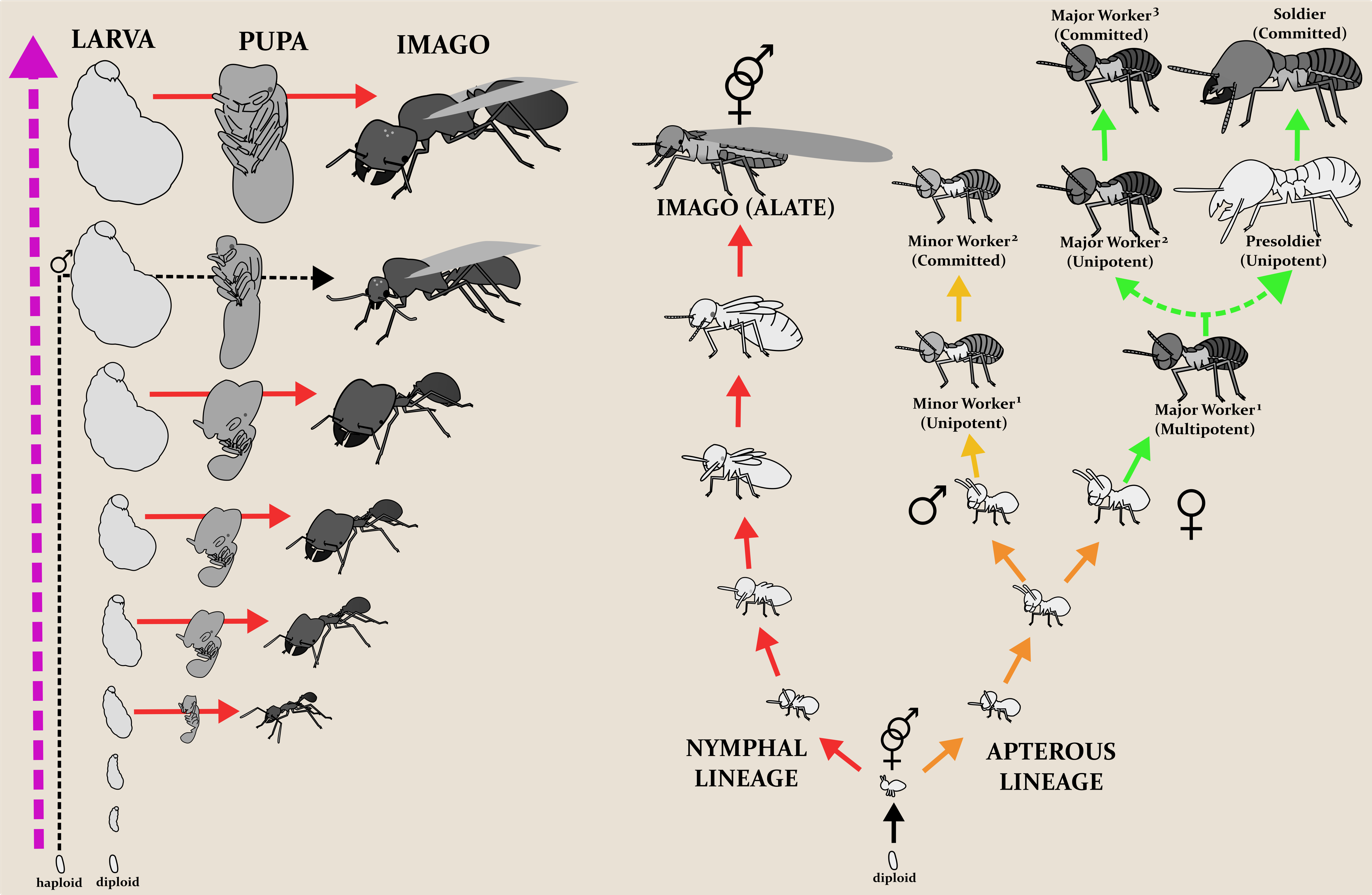
Developmental biology of ants versus termites. As opposed to ants which have a linear and irreversible development from larval instars to adult (imago), termites exhibit a more complex and often bifurcated development which allows for more flexible caste pathways. Although in most termites, caste development is restricted to closely related pathways dependent on a variety of factors such as pheromonal cues, sex and size of an individual.

Worker termites undertake the most labor within the colony, being responsible for foraging, food storage, and brood and nest maintenance. Workers are tasked with the digestion of cellulose in food and are thus the most likely caste to be found in infested wood. The process of worker termites feeding other nestmates is known as trophallaxis. Trophallaxis is an effective nutritional tactic to convert and recycle nitrogenous components. It frees the parents from feeding all but the first generation of offspring, allowing for the group to grow much larger and ensuring that the necessary gut symbionts are transferred from one generation to another, a process called vertical inheritance. Workers are believed to have evolved from older wingless immatures (larvae) that evolved cooperative behaviors; and indeed in some basal taxa the late instar larvae are known to undertake the role of workers without differentiating as a true separate caste. Workers can either be male or female, although in some species with polymorphic workers either sex may be restricted to a certain developmental path. Workers may also be fertile or sterile, however the term "worker" is normally reserved for the latter, having evolved in taxa that exhibit a bifurcated developmental pathway. As a result, sterile workers like in the family Termitidae are termed true workers and are the most derived, while those that are undifferentiated and fertile as in the wood-nesting Archotermopsidae are termed pseudergates, which are the most basal. True workers are individuals which irreversibly develop from the apterous lineage and have completely forgone development into a winged adult. They display altruistic behaviors and either have terminal molts or exhibit a low level of phenotypical potency. True workers across different termite taxa (Mastotermitidae, Hodotermitidae, Rhinotermitidae and Termitidae) can widely vary in the level of developmental plasticity even between closely related taxa, with many species having true workers that can molt into the other apterous castes such as ergatoids (worker reproductive; apterous neotenics), soldiers, or the other worker castes. Pseudergates sensu stricto are individuals which arise from the linear developmental pathway that have regressively molted and lost their wing buds, and are regarded as totipotent immatures. They are capable of performing work but are overall less involved in labor and considered more cooperative than truly altruistic. Pseudergates sensu lato, otherwise known as false workers, are most represented in basal lineages (Kalotermitidae, Archotermopsidae, Hodotermopsidae, Serritermitidae) and closely resemble true workers in which they also perform most of the work and are similarly altruistic, however differ in developing from the linear developmental pathway where they exist in a stationary molt; i.e they have halted development before the growth of wing buds, and are regarded as pluripotent immatures.

The soldier caste is the most anatomically and behaviorally specialized, and their sole purpose is to defend the colony. Many soldiers have large heads with highly modified powerful jaws so enlarged that they cannot feed themselves. Instead, like juveniles, they are fed by workers. Fontanelles, simple holes in the forehead that lead to a gland which exudes defensive secretions, are a feature of the clade Neoisoptera and are present in all extant taxa such as Rhinotermitidae. The majority of termite species have mandibulate soldiers which are easily identified by the disproportionately large sclerotized head and mandibles. Among certain termites, the soldier caste has evolved globular (phragmotic) heads to block their narrow tunnels such as seen in Cryptotermes. Amongst mandibulate soldiers, the mandibles have been adapted for a variety of defensive strategies: Biting/crushing (Incisitermes), slashing (Cubitermes), slashing/snapping (Dentispicotermes), symmetrical snapping (Termes), asymmetrical snapping (Neocapritermes), and piercing (Amitermes). In the more derived termite taxa, the soldier caste can be polymorphic and include minor and major forms. Other morphologically specialized soldiers includes the Nasutes, which have a horn-like nozzle projection (nasus) on the head. These unique soldiers are able to spray noxious, sticky secretions containing diterpenes at their enemies. Nitrogen fixation plays an important role in Nasute nutrition. Soldiers are normally a committed sterile caste and so do not molt into anything else, but in certain basal taxa like the Archotermopsidae they are known to rarely molt into neotenic forms that develop functional sexual organs. In species with the linear developmental pathway, soldiers develop from apterous immatures and constitute the only true sterile caste in these taxa.

The primary reproductive caste of a colony consists of the fertile adult (imago) female and male individuals, colloquially known as the queen and king. The queen is responsible for egg production of the colony. Unlike in ants, the male and female reproductives form lifelong pairs where the king will continue to mate with the queen throughout their lives. In some species, the abdomen of the queen swells up dramatically to increase fecundity, a characteristic known as physogastrism. Depending on the species, the queen starts producing reproductive alates at a certain time of the year, and huge swarms emerge from the colony when nuptial flight begins. These swarms attract a wide variety of predators. The queens can be particularly long-lived for insects, with some reportedly living as long as 30 years. In both the linear and bifurcated developmental pathways, the primary reproductives only develop from winged immatures (nymphs). These winged immatures are capable of regressively molting into a form known as brachypterous neotenics (nymphoids), which retain juvenile and adult characteristics. BN's can be found in both the derived and basal termite taxa, and generally serve as supplementary reproductives.

== Life cycle ==
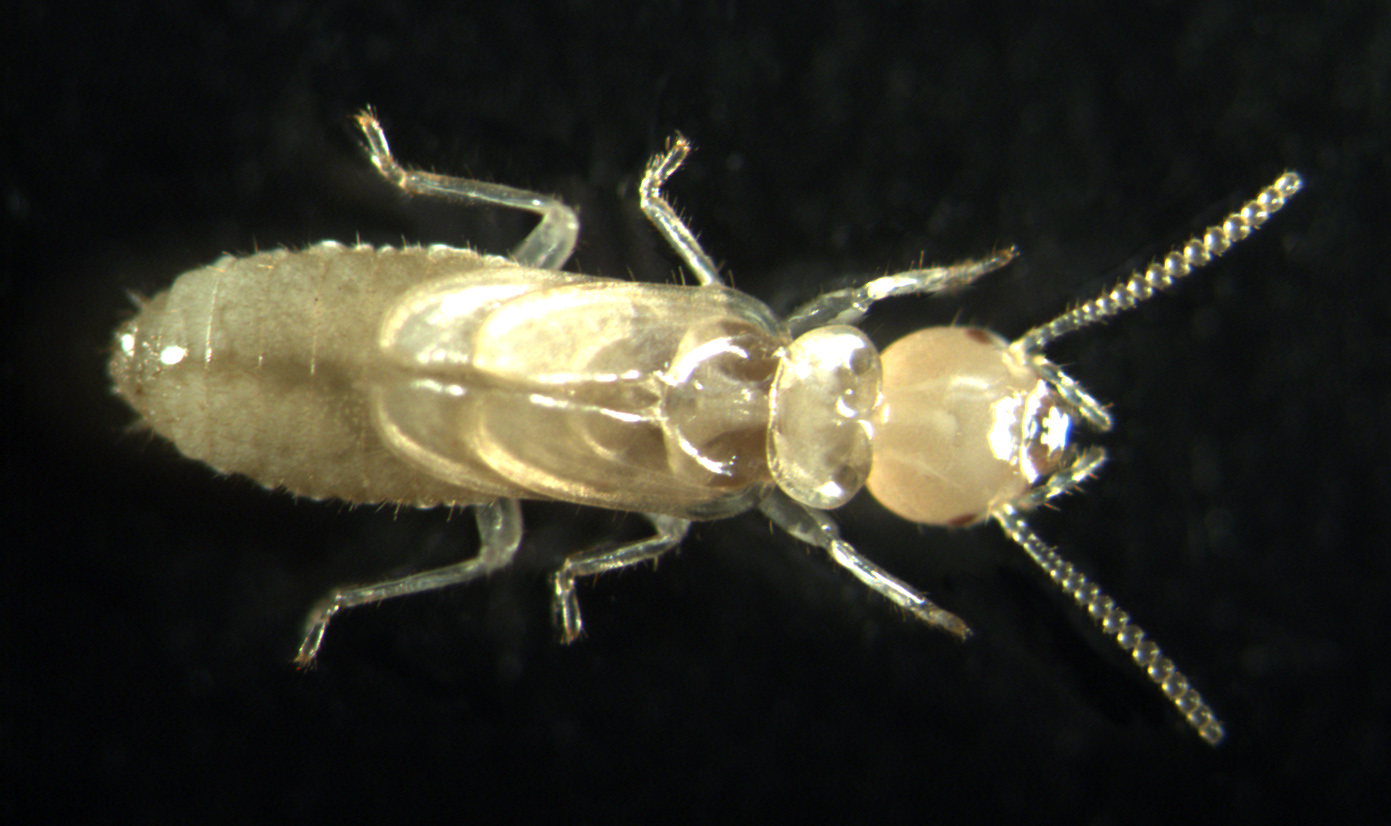
A young termite nymph featuring visible wing buds. Nymphs mainly develop into alates.

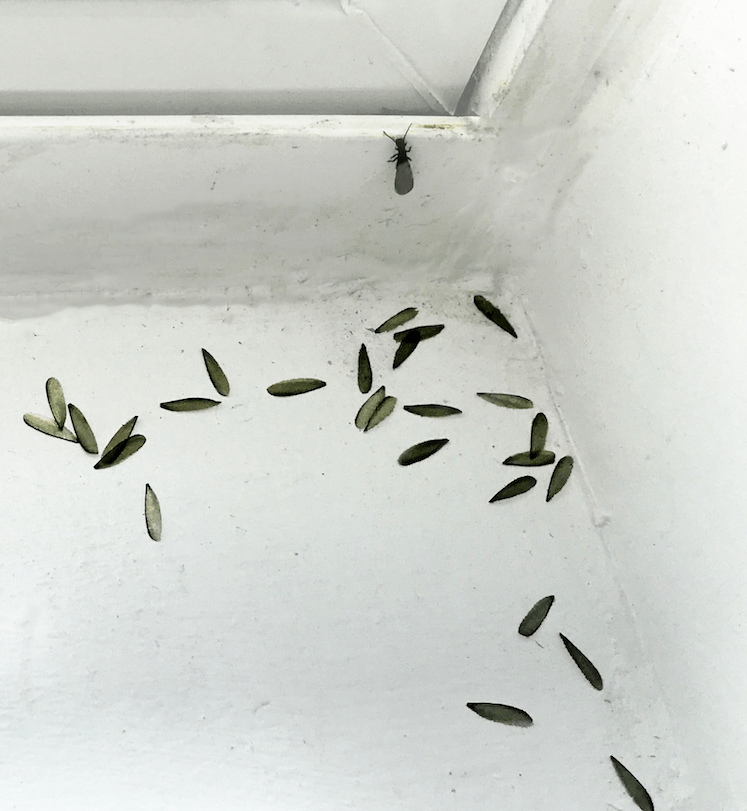
A termite alate with shed wings from other alates on an interior window sill. Shedding of wings is associated with reproductive swarming.

Termites are often compared with the social Hymenoptera (ants and various species of bees and wasps), but their differing evolutionary origins result in major differences in life cycle. In the eusocial Hymenoptera, the workers are exclusively female. Males (drones) are haploid and develop from unfertilised eggs, while females (both workers and the queen) are diploid and develop from fertilised eggs. In contrast, worker termites, which constitute the majority in a colony, are diploid individuals of both sexes and develop from fertilised eggs. Depending on species, male and female workers may have different roles in a termite colony.

The life cycle of a termite begins with an egg, but is different from that of a bee or ant in that it goes through a developmental process called incomplete metamorphosis, going through multiple gradual pre-adult molts that are highly developmentally plastic before becoming an adult. Unlike in other hemimetabolous insects, nymphs are more strictly defined in termites as immature young with visible wing buds, which often invariably go through a series of moults to become winged adults. Larvae, which are defined as early nymph instars with absent wing buds, exhibit the highest developmental potentiality and are able to molt into Alates, Soldiers, Neotenics, or Workers. Workers are believed to have evolved from larvae, sharing many similarities to the extent that workers can be regarded as "larval", in that both lack wings, eyes, and functional reproductive organs while maintaining varying levels of developmental flexibility, although usually to a much lesser extent in workers. The main distinction being that while larvae are wholly dependent on other nestmates to survive, workers are independent and are able to feed themselves and contribute to the colony. Workers remain wingless and across many taxa become developmentally arrested, appearing to not change into any other caste until death. In some basal taxa, there is no distinction, with the "workers" (pseudergates) essentially being late instar larvae that retain the ability to change into all other castes.

The development of larvae into adults can take months; the time period depends on food availability and nutrition, temperature, and the size of the colony. Since larvae and nymphs are unable to feed themselves, workers must feed them, but workers also take part in the social life of the colony and have certain other tasks to accomplish such as foraging, building or maintaining the nest or tending to the queen. Pheromones regulate the caste system in termite colonies, preventing all but a very few of the termites from becoming fertile queens.

Queens of the eusocial termite Reticulitermes speratus are capable of a long lifespan without sacrificing fecundity. These long-lived queens have a significantly lower level of oxidative damage, including oxidative DNA damage, than workers, soldiers and nymphs. The lower levels of damage appear to be due to increased catalase, an enzyme that protects against oxidative stress.

=== Reproduction ===
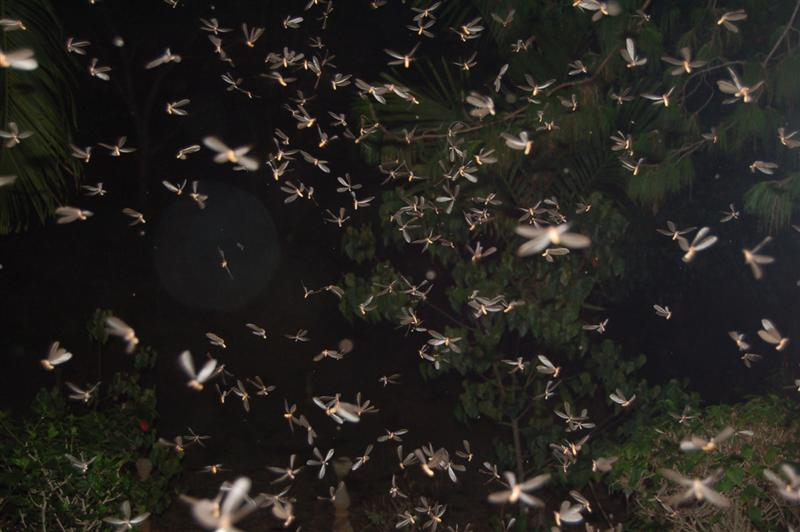
Alates swarming during nuptial flight after rain

Termite alates (winged virgin queens and kings) only leave the colony when a nuptial flight takes place. Alate males and females pair up together and then land in search of a suitable place for a colony. A termite king and queen do not mate until they find such a spot. When they do, they excavate a chamber big enough for both, close up the entrance and proceed to mate. After mating, the pair may never surface again, spending the rest of their lives in the nest. Nuptial flight time varies in each species. For example, alates in certain species emerge during the day in summer while others emerge during the winter. The nuptial flight may also begin at dusk, when the alates swarm around areas with many lights. The time when nuptial flight begins depends on the environmental conditions, the time of day, moisture, wind speed and precipitation. The number of termites in a colony also varies, with the larger species typically having 100–1,000 individuals. However, some termite colonies, including those with many individuals, can number in the millions.

The queen only lays 10–20 eggs in the very early stages of the colony, but lays as many as 1,000 a day when the colony is several years old. At maturity, a primary queen has a great capacity to lay eggs. In some species, the mature queen has a greatly distended abdomen and may produce 40,000 eggs a day. The two mature ovaries may have some 2,000 ovarioles each. The abdomen increases the queen's body length to several times more than before mating and reduces her ability to move freely; attendant workers provide assistance.

Egg grooming behaviour of Reticulitermes speratus workers in a nursery cell

The king grows only slightly larger after initial mating and continues to mate with the queen for life (a termite queen can live between 30 and 50 years); this is very different from ant colonies, in which a queen mates once with the males and stores the gametes for life, as the male ants die shortly after mating. If a queen is absent, a termite king produces pheromones which encourage the development of replacement termite queens. As the queen and king are monogamous, sperm competition does not occur.

Termites going through incomplete metamorphosis on the path to becoming alates form a subcaste in certain species of termite, functioning as potential supplementary reproductives. These supplementary reproductives only mature into primary reproductives upon the death of a king or queen, or when the primary reproductives are separated from the colony. Supplementaries have the ability to replace a dead primary reproductive, and there may also be more than a single supplementary within a colony. Some queens have the ability to switch from sexual reproduction to asexual reproduction. Studies show that while termite queens mate with the king to produce colony workers, the queens reproduce their replacements (neotenic queens) parthenogenetically.

The neotropical termite Embiratermes neotenicus and several other related species produce colonies that contain a primary king accompanied by a primary queen or by up to 200 neotenic queens that had originated through thelytokous parthenogenesis of a founding primary queen. The form of parthenogenesis likely employed maintains heterozygosity in the passage of the genome from mother to daughter, thus avoiding inbreeding depression.

== Behaviour and ecology ==
=== Diet ===
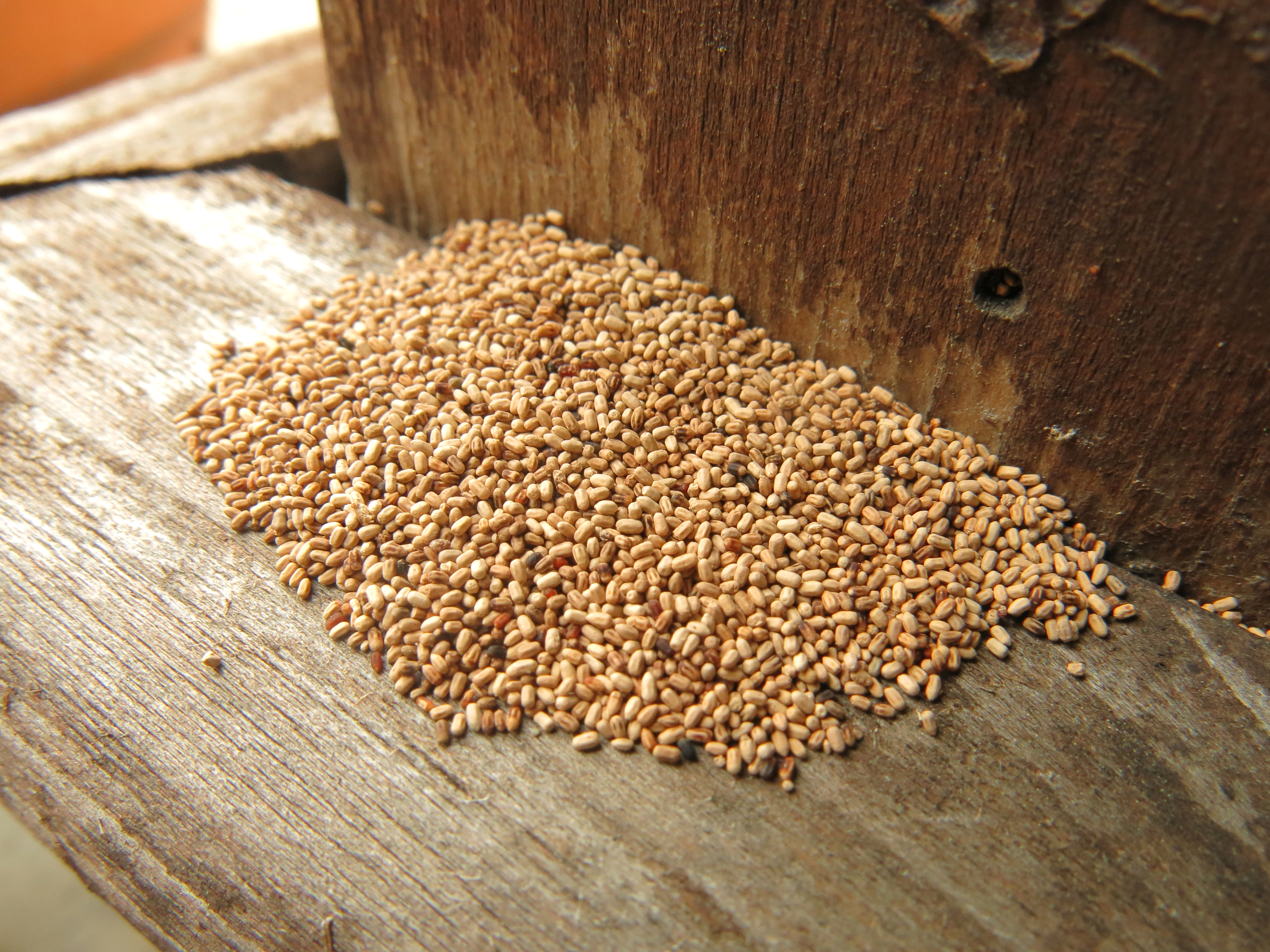
Termite faecal pellets

Termites are primarily detritivores, consuming dead plants at any level of decomposition. They also play a vital role in the ecosystem by recycling waste material such as dead wood, faeces and plants. Many species eat cellulose, having a specialised midgut that breaks down the fibre. Termites are considered to be a major source (11%) of atmospheric methane, one of the prime greenhouse gases, produced from the breakdown of cellulose. Termites rely primarily upon a symbiotic microbial community that includes bacteria and flagellate protists, such as metamonads and hypermastigids. This community provides the enzymes that digests the cellulose, allowing the insects to absorb the end products for their own use.

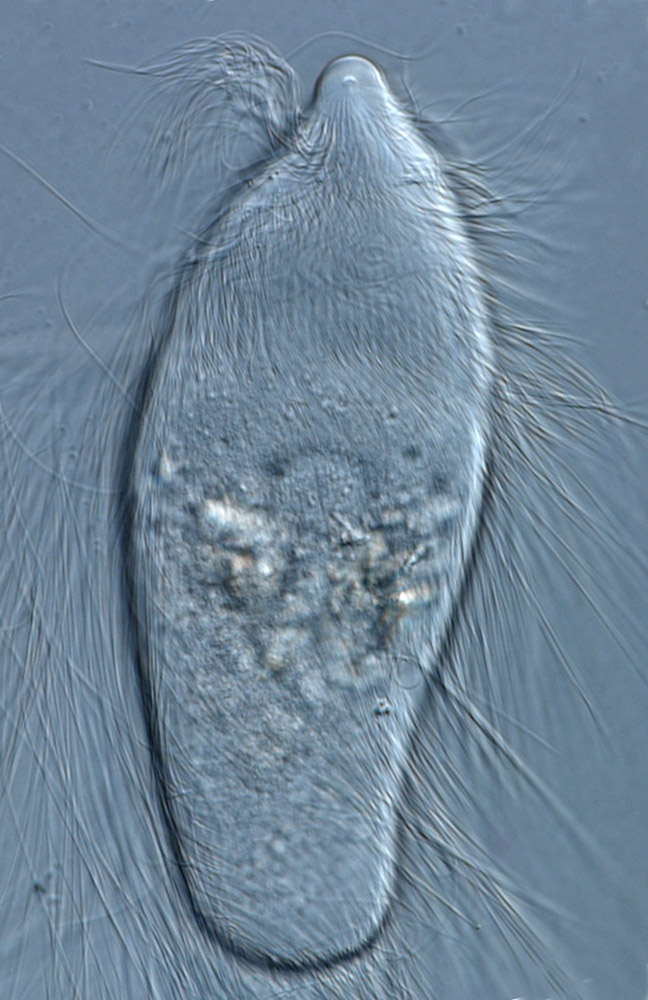
Trichonymphid flagellate from Reticulitermes. Light microscope image of living cell.

The microbial ecosystem present in the termite gut contains many species found nowhere else on Earth. Termites hatch without these symbionts present in their guts, and develop them after being fed a culture from other termites. Gut protozoa, such as Trichonympha, in turn, rely on symbiotic bacteria embedded on their surfaces to produce some of the necessary digestive enzymes. Most higher termites, especially in the family Termitidae, can produce their own cellulase enzymes, but they rely primarily upon the bacteria. The flagellates have been lost in Termitidae. Researchers have found species of spirochetes living in termite guts capable of fixing atmospheric nitrogen to a form usable by the insect. Scientists' understanding of the relationship between the termite digestive tract and the microbial endosymbionts is still rudimentary; what is true in all termite species, however, is that the workers feed the other members of the colony with substances derived from the digestion of plant material, either from the mouth or anus. Judging from closely related bacterial species, it is strongly presumed that the termites' and cockroach's gut microbiota derives from their dictyopteran ancestors. Despite primarily consuming decaying plant material as a group, many termite species have been observed to opportunistically feed on dead animals to supplement their dietary needs. Termites are also known to harbor bacteriophages in their gut. Some of these bacteriophages likely infect the symbiotic bacteria which play a key role in termite biology. The exact role and function of bacteriophages in the termite gut microbiome is not clearly understood. Termite gut bacteriophages also show similarity to bacteriophages (CrAssphage) found in the human gut.

Certain species such as Gnathamitermes tubiformans have seasonal food habits. For example, they may preferentially consume Red three-awn (Aristida longiseta) during the summer, Buffalograss (Buchloe dactyloides) from May to August, and blue grama Bouteloua gracilis during spring, summer and autumn. Colonies of G. tubiformans consume less food in spring than they do during autumn when their feeding activity is high.

Various woods differ in their susceptibility to termite attack; the differences are attributed to such factors as moisture content, hardness, and resin and lignin content. In one study, the drywood termite Cryptotermes brevis strongly preferred poplar and maple woods to other woods that were generally rejected by the termite colony. These preferences may in part have represented conditioned or learned behaviour.

Some species of termite practice fungiculture. They maintain a "garden" of specialised fungi of genus Termitomyces, which are nourished by the excrement of the insects. When the fungi are eaten, their spores pass undamaged through the intestines of the termites to complete the cycle by germinating in the fresh faecal pellets. Molecular evidence suggests that the family Macrotermitinae developed agriculture about 31 million years ago. It is assumed that more than 90 per cent of dry wood in the semiarid savannah ecosystems of Africa and Asia are reprocessed by these termites. Originally living in the rainforest, fungus farming allowed them to colonise the African savannah and other new environments, eventually expanding into Asia.

Depending on their feeding habits, termites are placed into two groups: the lower termites and higher termites. The lower termites predominately feed on wood. As wood is difficult to digest, termites prefer to consume fungus-infected wood because it is easier to digest and the fungi are high in protein. Meanwhile, the higher termites consume a wide variety of materials, including faeces, humus, grass, leaves and roots. The gut of the lower termites contains many species of bacteria along with protozoa and Holomastigotoides, while the higher termites only have a few species of bacteria with no protozoa.

=== Predators ===
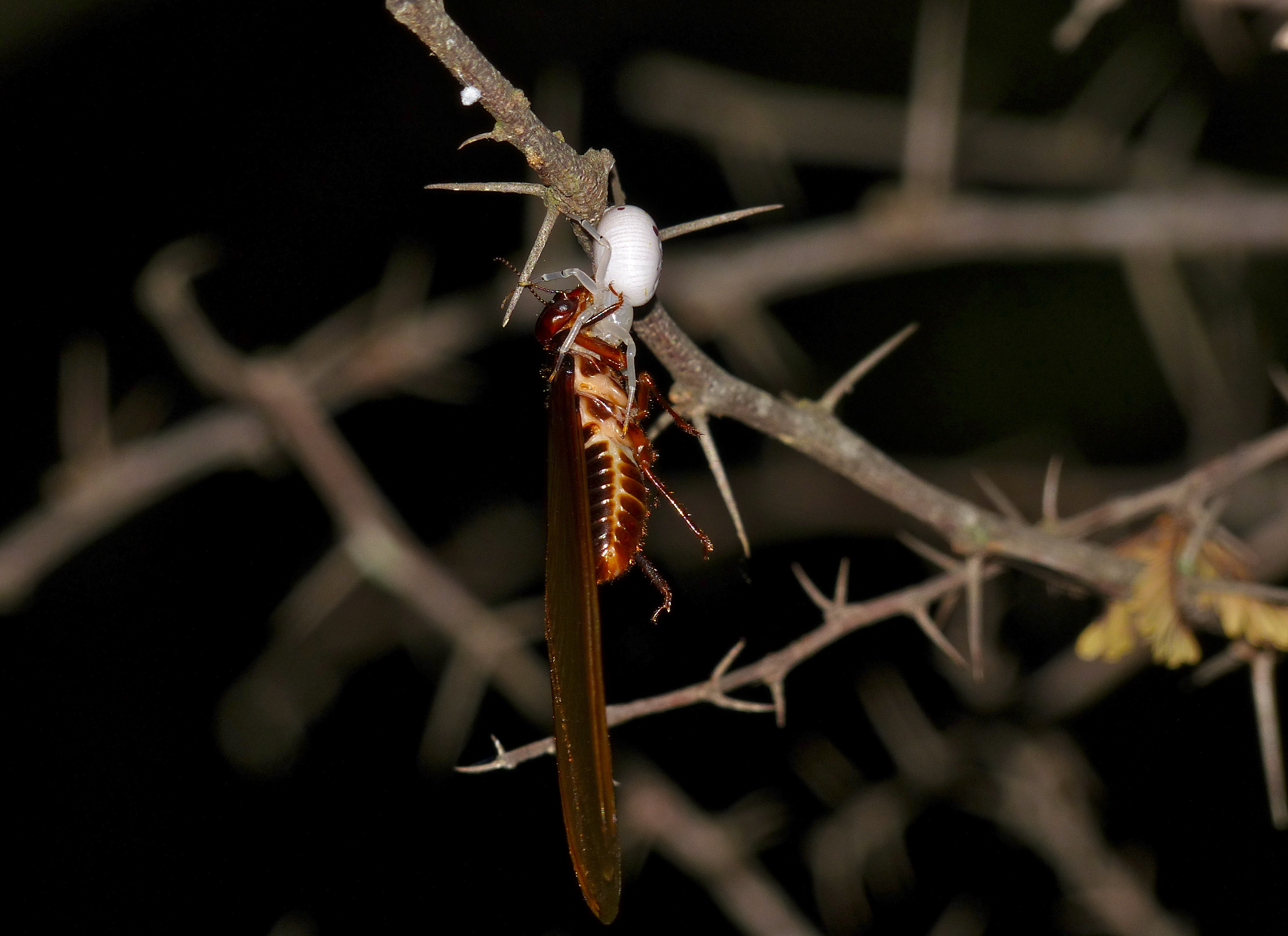
Crab spider with a captured alate

Termites are consumed by a wide variety of predators. One termite species alone, Hodotermes mossambicus, was reported (1990) in the stomach contents of 65 birds and 19 mammals. Arthropods such as ants, centipedes, cockroaches, crickets, dragonflies, scorpions and spiders, reptiles such as lizards, and amphibians such as frogs and toads consume termites, with two spiders in the family Ammoxenidae being specialist termite predators. Other predators include aardvarks, aardwolves, anteaters, bats, bears, bilbies, many birds, echidnas, foxes, galagos, numbats, mice and pangolins. The aardwolf is an insectivorous mammal that primarily feeds on termites; it locates its food by sound and also by detecting the scent secreted by the soldiers; a single aardwolf is capable of consuming thousands of termites in a single night by using its long, sticky tongue. Sloth bears break open mounds to consume the nestmates, while chimpanzees have developed tools to "fish" termites from their nest. Wear pattern analysis of bone tools used by the early hominin Paranthropus robustus suggests that they used these tools to dig into termite mounds.

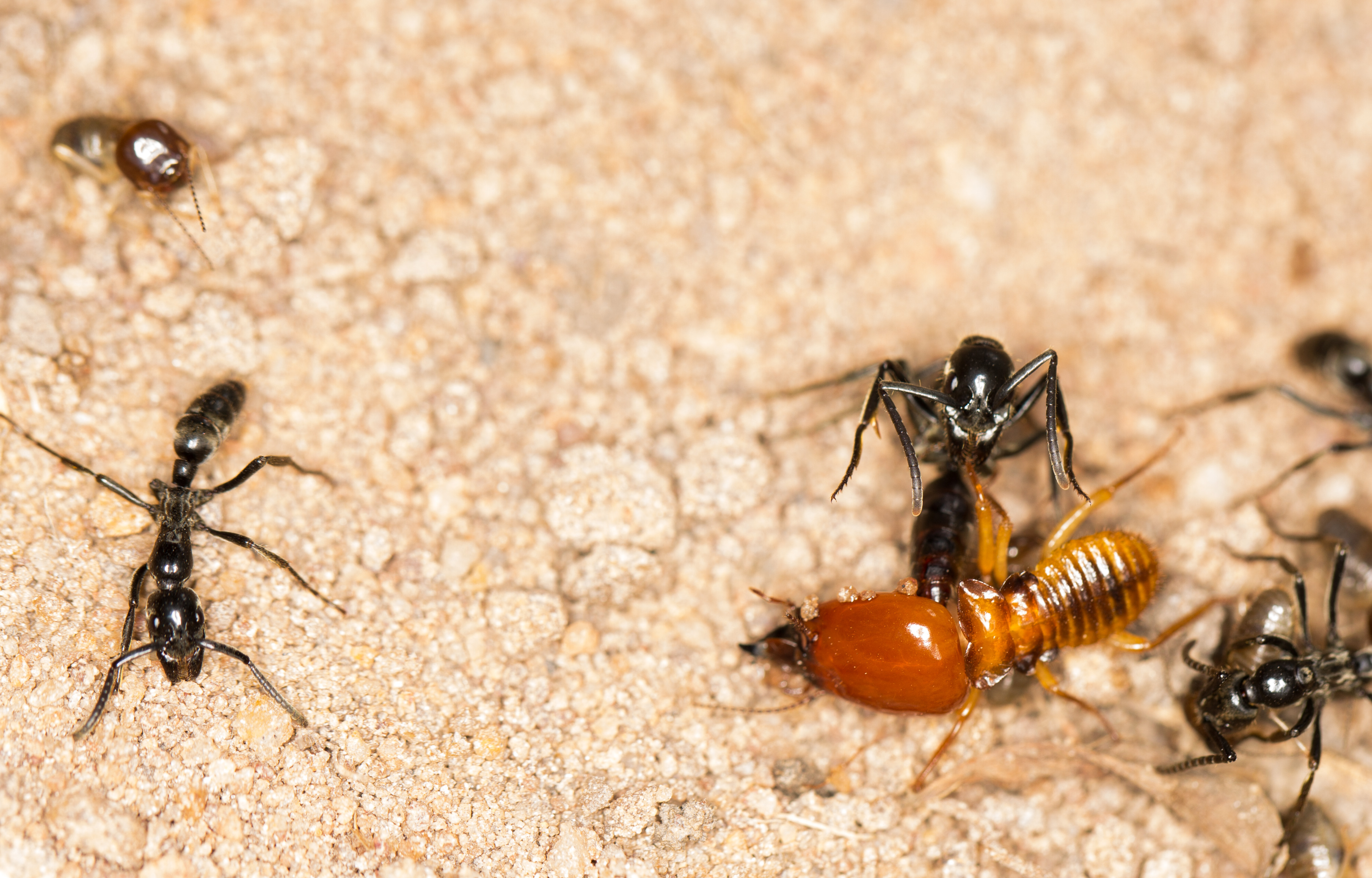
A Matabele ant (Megaponera analis) kills a Macrotermes bellicosus termite soldier during a raid.

Among all predators, ants are the greatest enemy to termites. Some ant genera are specialist predators of termites. For example, Megaponera is a strictly termite-eating (termitophagous) genus that perform raiding activities, some lasting several hours. Paltothyreus tarsatus is another termite-raiding species, with each individual stacking as many termites as possible in its mandibles before returning home, all the while recruiting additional nestmates to the raiding site through chemical trails. The Malaysian basicerotine ants Eurhopalothrix heliscata uses a different strategy of termite hunting by pressing themselves into tight spaces, as they hunt through rotting wood housing termite colonies. Once inside, the ants seize their prey by using their short but sharp mandibles. Tetramorium uelense is a specialised predator species that feeds on small termites. A scout recruits 10–30 workers to an area where termites are present, killing them by immobilising them with their stinger. Centromyrmex and Iridomyrmex colonies sometimes nest in termite mounds, and so the termites are preyed on by these ants. No evidence for any kind of relationship (other than a predatory one) is known. Other ants, including Acanthostichus, Camponotus, Crematogaster, Cylindromyrmex, Leptogenys, Odontomachus, Ophthalmopone, Pachycondyla, Rhytidoponera, Solenopsis and Wasmannia, also prey on termites. Specialized subterranean species of army ants such as ones in the genus Dorylus are known to commonly predate on young Macrotermes colonies.

Ants are not the only invertebrates that perform raids. Many sphecoid wasps and several species including Polybia and Angiopolybia are known to raid termite mounds during the termites' nuptial flight.

=== Parasites, pathogens, and viruses ===
Termites are less likely to be attacked by parasites than bees, wasps and ants, as they are usually well protected in their mounds. Nevertheless, termites are infected by a variety of parasites. Some of these include dipteran flies, Pyemotes mites, and a large number of nematode parasites. Most nematode parasites are in the order Rhabditida; others are in the genus Mermis, Diplogaster aerivora and Harteria gallinarum. Under imminent threat of an attack by parasites, a colony may migrate to a new location. Certain fungal pathogens such as Aspergillus nomius and Metarhizium anisopliae are, however, major threats to a termite colony as they are not host-specific and may infect large portions of the colony; transmission usually occurs via direct physical contact. M. anisopliae is known to weaken the termite immune system. Infection with A. nomius only occurs when a colony is under great stress. Over 34 fungal species are known to live as parasites on the exoskeleton of termites, with many being host-specific and only causing indirect harm to their host.

Termites are infected by viruses including Entomopoxvirinae and the Nuclear Polyhedrosis Virus.

=== Locomotion and foraging ===
Because the worker and soldier castes lack wings and thus never fly, and the reproductives use their wings for just a brief amount of time, termites predominantly rely upon their legs to move about.

Foraging behaviour depends on the type of termite. For example, certain species feed on the wood structures they inhabit, and others harvest food that is near the nest. Most workers are rarely found out in the open, and do not forage unprotected; they rely on sheeting and runways to protect them from predators. Subterranean termites construct tunnels and galleries to look for food, and workers who manage to find food sources recruit additional nestmates by depositing a phagostimulant pheromone that attracts workers. Foraging workers use semiochemicals to communicate with each other, and workers who begin to forage outside of their nest release trail pheromones from their sternal glands. In one species, Nasutitermes costalis, there are three phases in a foraging expedition: first, soldiers scout an area. When they find a food source, they communicate to other soldiers and a small force of workers starts to emerge. In the second phase, workers appear in large numbers at the site. The third phase is marked by a decrease in the number of soldiers present and an increase in the number of workers. Isolated termite workers may engage in Lévy flight behaviour as an optimised strategy for finding their nestmates or foraging for food.

=== Competition ===
Competition between two colonies always results in agonistic behaviour towards each other, resulting in fights. These fights can cause mortality on both sides and, in some cases, the gain or loss of territory. "Cemetery pits" may be present, where the bodies of dead termites are buried.

Studies show that when termites encounter each other in foraging areas, some of the termites deliberately block passages to prevent other termites from entering. Dead termites from other colonies found in exploratory tunnels leads to the isolation of the area and thus the need to construct new tunnels. Conflict between two competitors does not always occur. For example, though they might block each other's passages, colonies of Macrotermes bellicosus and Macrotermes subhyalinus are not always aggressive towards each other. Suicide cramming is known in Coptotermes formosanus. Since C. formosanus colonies may get into physical conflict, some termites squeeze tightly into foraging tunnels and die, successfully blocking the tunnel and ending all agonistic activities.

Among the reproductive caste, neotenic queens may compete with each other to become the dominant queen when there are no primary reproductives. This struggle among the queens leads to the elimination of all but a single queen, which, with the king, takes over the colony.

Ants and termites may compete with each other for nesting space. In particular, ants that prey on termites usually have a negative impact on arboreal nesting species.

=== Communication ===
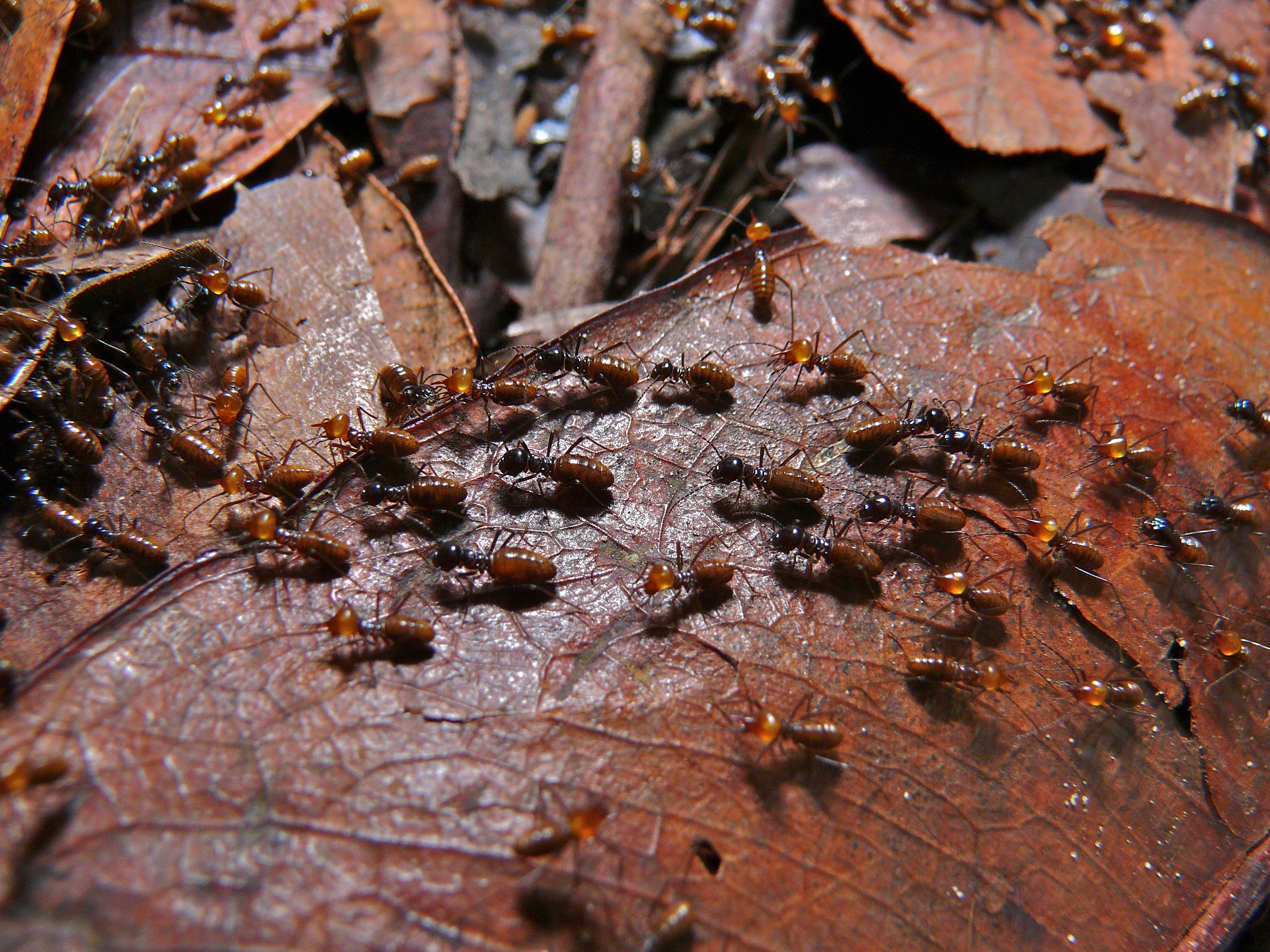
Hordes of Nasutitermes on a march for food, following and leaving trail pheromones

Most termites are blind, so communication primarily occurs through chemical, mechanical and pheromonal cues. These methods of communication are used in a variety of activities, including foraging, locating reproductives, construction of nests, recognition of nestmates, nuptial flight, locating and fighting enemies, and defending the nests. The most common way of communicating is through antennation. A number of pheromones are known, including contact pheromones (which are transmitted when workers are engaged in trophallaxis or grooming) and alarm, trail and sex pheromones. The alarm pheromone and other defensive chemicals are secreted from the frontal gland. Trail pheromones are secreted from the sternal gland, and sex pheromones derive from two glandular sources: the sternal and tergal glands. When termites go out to look for food, they forage in columns along the ground through vegetation. A trail can be identified by the faecal deposits or runways that are covered by objects. Workers leave pheromones on these trails, which are detected by other nestmates through olfactory receptors. Termites can also communicate through mechanical cues, vibrations, and physical contact. These signals are frequently used for alarm communication or for evaluating a food source.

When termites construct their nests, they use predominantly indirect communication. No single termite would be in charge of any particular construction project. Individual termites react rather than think, but at a group level, they exhibit a sort of collective cognition. Specific structures or other objects such as pellets of soil or pillars cause termites to start building. The termite adds these objects onto existing structures, and such behaviour encourages building behaviour in other workers. The result is a self-organised process whereby the information that directs termite activity results from changes in the environment rather than from direct contact among individuals.

Termites can distinguish nestmates and non-nestmates through chemical communication and gut symbionts: chemicals consisting of hydrocarbons released from the cuticle allow the recognition of alien termite species. Each colony has its own distinct odour. This odour is a result of genetic and environmental factors such as the termites' diet and the composition of the bacteria within the termites' intestines.

=== Defence ===
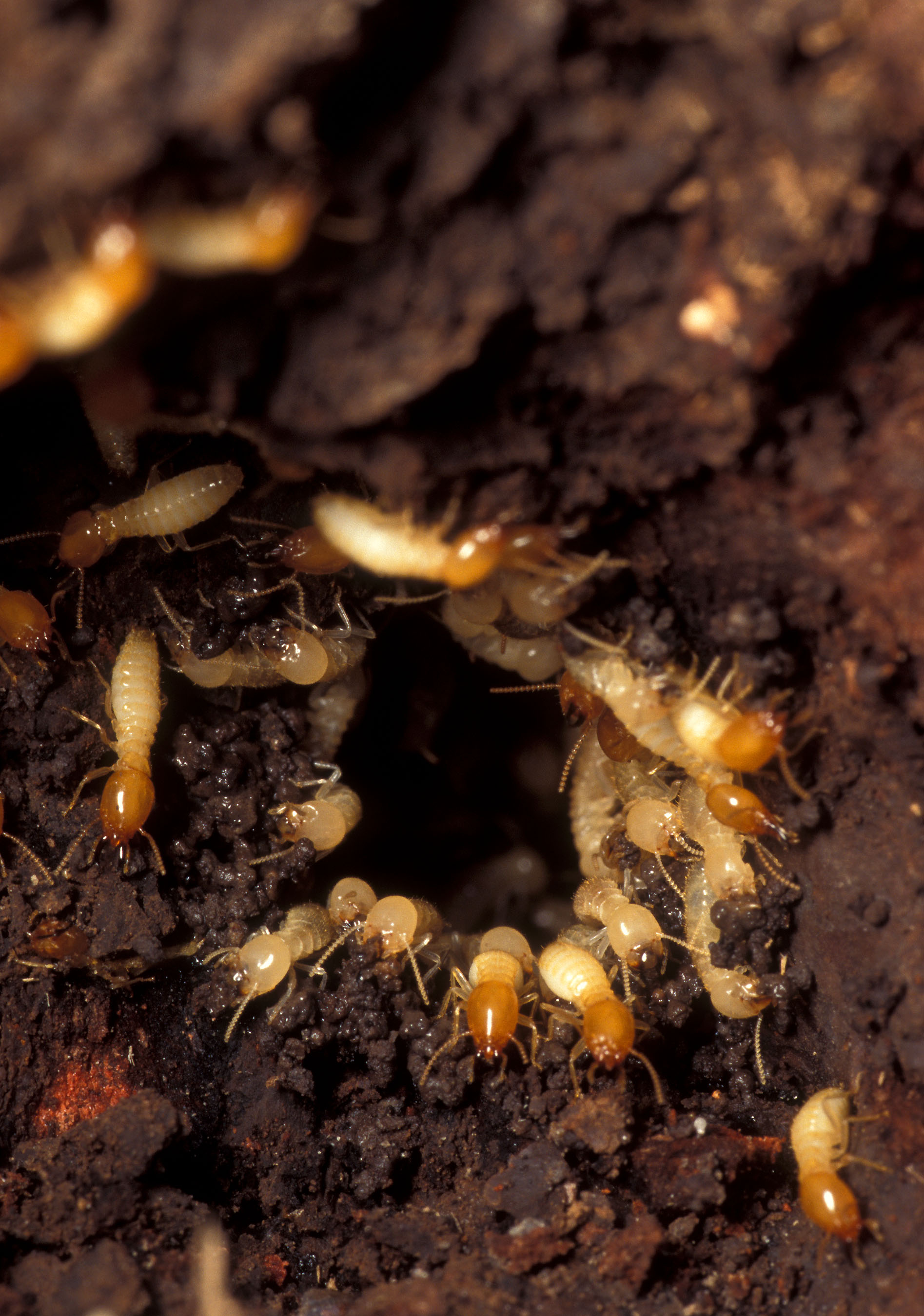
Termites rush to a damaged area of the nest.

Termites rely on alarm communication to defend a colony. Alarm pheromones can be released when the nest has been breached or is being attacked by enemies or potential pathogens. Termites always avoid nestmates infected with Metarhizium anisopliae spores, through vibrational signals released by infected nestmates. Other methods of defence include headbanging and secretion of fluids from the frontal gland and defecating faeces containing alarm pheromones.

In some species, some soldiers block tunnels to prevent their enemies from entering the nest, and they may deliberately rupture themselves as an act of defence. In cases where the intrusion is coming from a breach that is larger than the soldier's head, soldiers form a phalanx-like formation around the breach and bite at intruders. If an invasion carried out by Megaponera analis is successful, an entire colony may be destroyed, although this scenario is rare.

To termites, any breach of their tunnels or nests is a cause for alarm. When termites detect a potential breach, the soldiers usually bang their heads, apparently to attract other soldiers for defence and to recruit additional workers to repair any breach. Additionally, an alarmed termite bumps into other termites which causes them to be alarmed and to leave pheromone trails to the disturbed area, which is also a way to recruit extra workers.

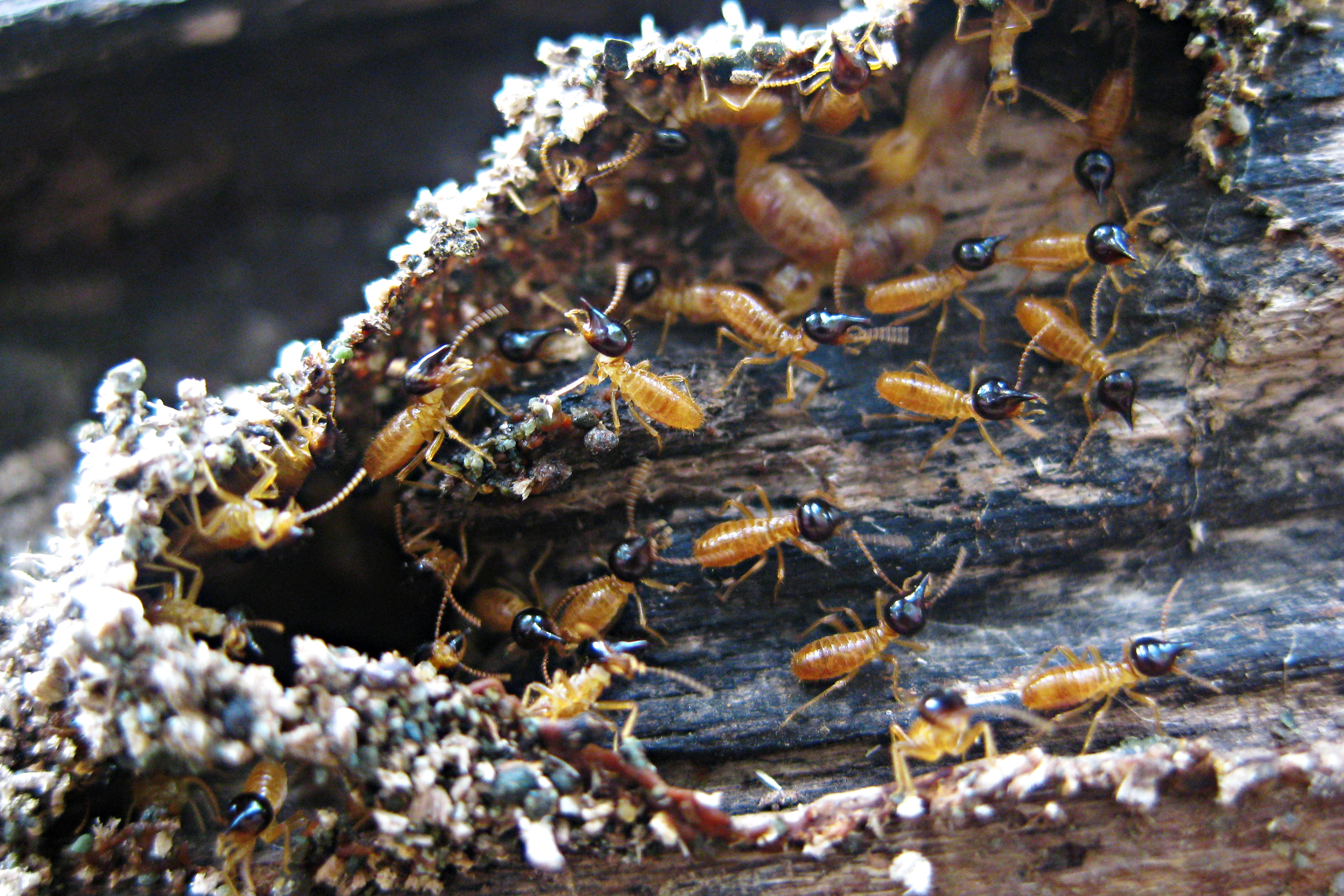
Nasute termite soldiers on rotten wood

The pantropical subfamily Nasutitermitinae has a specialised caste of soldiers, known as nasutes, that have the ability to exude noxious liquids through a horn-like frontal projection that they use for defence. Nasutes have lost their mandibles through the course of evolution and must be fed by workers. A wide variety of monoterpene hydrocarbon solvents have been identified in the liquids that nasutes secrete. Similarly, Formosan subterranean termites have been known to secrete naphthalene to protect their nests.

Soldiers of the species Globitermes sulphureus commit suicide by autothysis – rupturing a large gland just beneath the surface of their cuticles. The thick, yellow fluid in the gland becomes very sticky on contact with the air, entangling ants or other insects that are trying to invade the nest. Another termite, Neocapriterme taracua, also engages in suicidal defence. Workers physically unable to use their mandibles while in a fight form a pouch full of chemicals, then deliberately rupture themselves, releasing toxic chemicals that paralyse and kill their enemies. The soldiers of the neotropical termite family Serritermitidae have a defence strategy which involves front gland autothysis, with the body rupturing between the head and abdomen. When soldiers guarding nest entrances are attacked by intruders, they engage in autothysis, creating a block that denies entry to any attacker.

Workers use several different strategies to deal with their dead, including burying, cannibalism, and avoiding a corpse altogether. To avoid pathogens, termites occasionally engage in necrophoresis, in which a nestmate carries away a corpse from the colony to dispose of it elsewhere. Which strategy is used depends on the nature of the corpse a worker is dealing with (i.e. the age of the carcass).

=== Relationship with other organisms ===
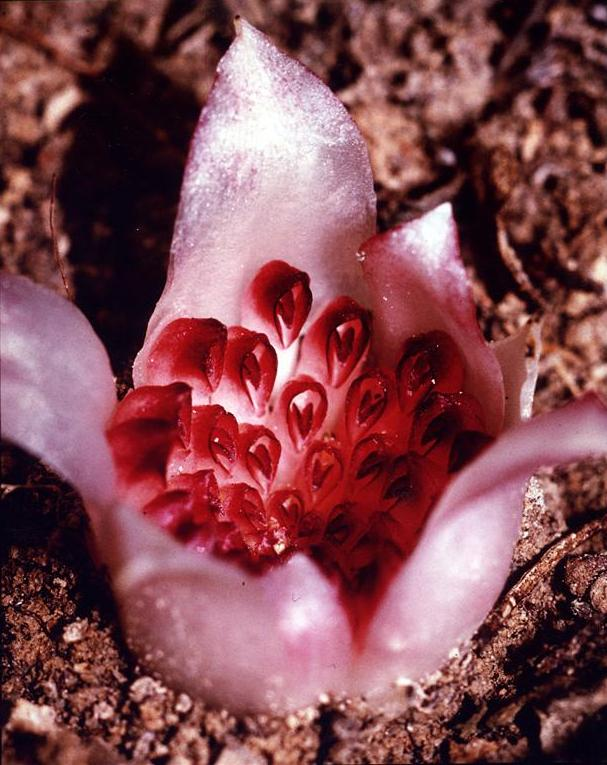
Rhizanthella gardneri is the only orchid known to be pollinated by termites.

A species of fungus is known to mimic termite eggs, successfully avoiding its natural predators. These small brown balls, known as "termite balls", rarely kill the eggs, and in some cases the workers tend to them. This fungus mimics these eggs by producing cellulose-digesting enzymes known as glucosidases. A unique mimicking behaviour exists between various species of Trichopsenius beetles and certain termite species within Reticulitermes. The beetles share the same cuticle hydrocarbons as the termites and even biosynthesize them. This chemical mimicry allows the beetles to integrate themselves within the termite colonies. The developed appendages on the physogastric abdomen of Austrospirachtha mimetes allows the beetle to mimic a termite worker.

Some ant species are known to capture termites to use as a fresh food source later on, rather than killing them. For example, Formica nigra captures termites, and those that try to escape are immediately seized and driven underground. Certain species of ants in the subfamily Ponerinae conduct these raids although other ant species go in alone to steal the eggs or nymphs. Ants such as Megaponera analis attack the outside of mounds and Dorylinae ants attack underground. Despite this, some termites and ants can coexist peacefully and mutually benefit from cohabitation. Some species of termite, including Nasutitermes corniger, form associations with certain ant species to keep away predatory ant species. The earliest known association between Azteca ants and Nasutitermes termites date back to the Oligocene to Miocene period.

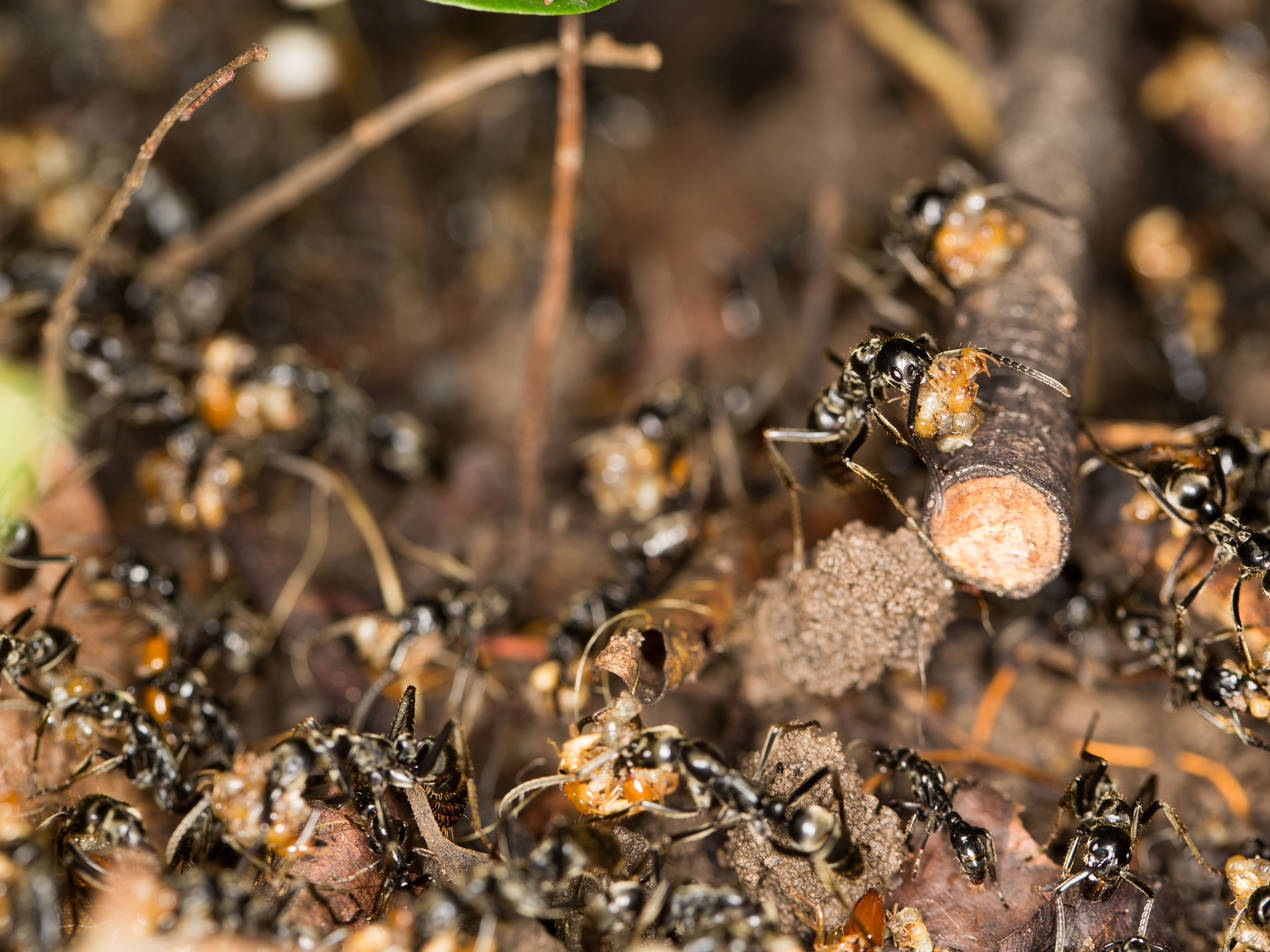
An ant raiding party collecting Pseudocanthotermes militaris termites after a successful raid

54 species of ants are known to inhabit Nasutitermes mounds, both occupied and abandoned ones. One reason many ants live in Nasutitermes mounds is due to the termites' frequent occurrence in their geographical range; another is to protect themselves from floods. Iridomyrmex also inhabits termite mounds although no evidence for any kind of relationship (other than a predatory one) is known. In rare cases, certain species of termites live inside active ant colonies. Some invertebrate organisms such as beetles, caterpillars, flies and millipedes are termitophiles and dwell inside termite colonies (they are unable to survive independently). As a result, certain beetles and flies have evolved with their hosts. They have developed a gland that secrete a substance that attracts the workers by licking them. Mounds may also provide shelter and warmth to birds, lizards, snakes and scorpions.

Termites are known to carry pollen and regularly visit flowers, so are regarded as potential pollinators for a number of flowering plants. One flower in particular, Rhizanthella gardneri, is regularly pollinated by foraging workers, and it is perhaps the only Orchidaceae flower in the world to be pollinated by termites.

Many plants have developed effective defences against termites. However, seedlings are vulnerable to termite attacks and need additional protection, as their defence mechanisms only develop when they have passed the seedling stage. Defence is typically achieved by secreting antifeedant chemicals into the woody cell walls. This reduces the ability of termites to efficiently digest the cellulose. A commercial product, "Blockaid", has been developed in Australia that uses a range of plant extracts to create a paint-on nontoxic termite barrier for buildings. An extract of a species of Australian false sandalwood, Eremophila mitchellii, has been shown to repel termites; tests have shown that termites are strongly repelled by the toxic material to the extent that they will starve rather than consume the food. When kept close to the extract, they become disoriented and eventually die.

=== Relationship with the environment ===
Termite populations can be substantially impacted by environmental changes including those caused by human intervention. A Brazilian study investigated the termite assemblages of three sites of Caatinga under different levels of anthropogenic disturbance in the semi-arid region of northeastern Brazil were sampled using 65 x 2 m transects. A total of 26 species of termites were present in the three sites, and 196 encounters were recorded in the transects. The termite assemblages were considerably different among sites, with a conspicuous reduction in both diversity and abundance with increased disturbance, related to the reduction of tree density and soil cover, and with the intensity of trampling by cattle and goats. The wood-feeders were the most severely affected feeding group.

== Nests ==
Termite workers at work

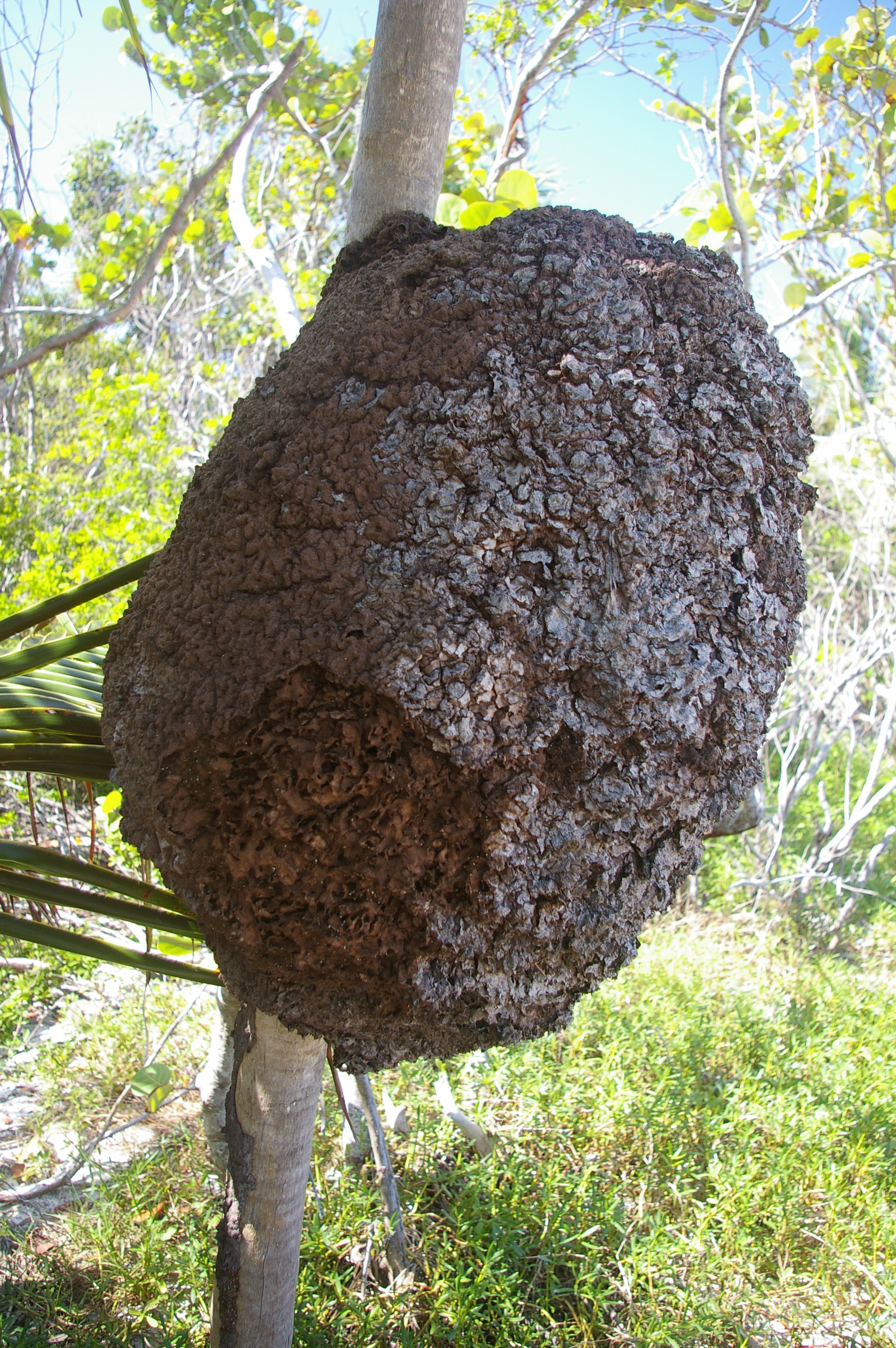
An arboreal termite nest in Mexico

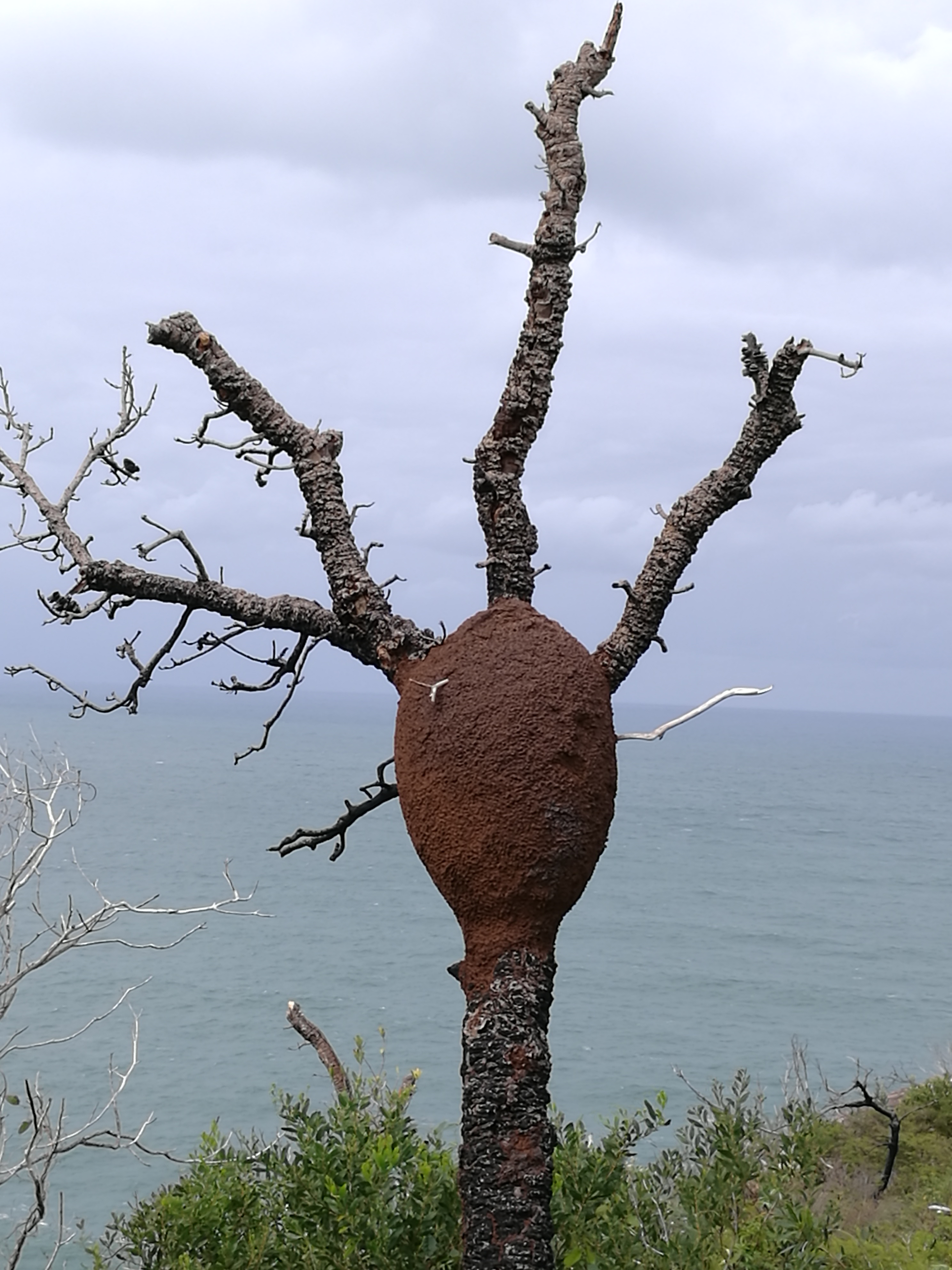
Termite nest in a Banksia, Palm Beach, Sydney.

A termite nest can be considered as being composed of two parts, the inanimate and the animate. The animate is all of the termites living inside the colony, and the inanimate part is the structure itself, which is constructed by the termites. Nests can be broadly separated into three main categories: hypogeal, i.e subterranean (completely below ground), epigeal (protruding above the soil surface), and arboreal (built above ground, but always connected to the ground via shelter tubes). Epigeal nests (mounds) protrude from the earth with ground contact and are made out of earth and mud. A nest has many functions such as providing a protected living space and providing shelter against predators. Most termites construct underground colonies rather than multifunctional nests and mounds. Primitive termites of today nest in wooden structures such as logs, stumps and the dead parts of trees, as did termites millions of years ago.

To build their nests, termites use a variety of resources such as faeces which have many desirable properties as a construction material. Other building materials include partly digested plant material, used in carton nests (arboreal nests built from faecal elements and wood), and soil, used in subterranean nest and mound construction. Not all nests are visible, as many nests in tropical forests are located underground. Species in the subfamily Apicotermitinae are good examples of subterranean nest builders, as they only dwell inside tunnels. Other termites live in wood, and tunnels are constructed as they feed on the wood. Nests and mounds protect the termites' soft bodies against desiccation, light, pathogens and parasites, as well as providing a fortification against predators. Nests made out of carton are particularly weak, and so the inhabitants use counter-attack strategies against invading predators.

Arboreal carton nests of mangrove swamp-dwelling Nasutitermes are enriched in lignin and depleted in cellulose and xylans. This change is caused by bacterial decay in the gut of the termites: they use their faeces as a carton building material. Arboreal termites nests can account for as much as 2% of above ground carbon storage in Puerto Rican mangrove swamps. These Nasutitermes nests are mainly composed of partially biodegraded wood material from the stems and branches of mangrove trees, namely, Rhizophora mangle (red mangrove), Avicennia germinans (black mangrove) and Laguncularia racemosa (white mangrove).

Some species build complex nests called polycalic nests; this habitat is called polycalism. Polycalic species of termites form multiple nests, or calies, connected by subterranean chambers. The termite genera Apicotermes and Trinervitermes are known to have polycalic species. Polycalic nests appear to be less frequent in mound-building species although polycalic arboreal nests have been observed in a few species of Nasutitermes.

=== Mounds ===
Video of termites in a mound

Nests are considered mounds if they protrude from the earth's surface. A mound provides termites the same protection as a nest but is stronger. Mounds located in areas with torrential and continuous rainfall are at risk of mound erosion due to their clay-rich construction. Those made from carton can provide protection from the rain, and in fact can withstand high precipitation. Certain areas in mounds are used as strong points in case of a breach. For example, Cubitermes colonies build narrow tunnels used as strong points, as the diameter of the tunnels is small enough for soldiers to block. A highly protected chamber, known as the "queen's cell", houses the queen and king and is used as a last line of defence.

Species in the genus Macrotermes arguably build the most complex structures in the insect world, constructing enormous mounds. These mounds are among the largest in the world, reaching a height of 8 to 9 metres (26 to 29 feet), and consist of chimneys, pinnacles and ridges. Another termite species, Amitermes meridionalis, can build nests 3 to 4 metres (9 to 13 feet) high and 2.5 metres (8 feet) wide. The tallest mound ever recorded was 12.8 metres (42 ft) long found in the Democratic Republic of the Congo.

The sculptured mounds sometimes have elaborate and distinctive forms, such as those of the compass termite (Amitermes meridionalis and A. laurensis), which builds tall, wedge-shaped mounds with the long axis oriented approximately north–south, which gives them their common name. This orientation has been experimentally shown to assist thermoregulation. The north–south orientation causes the internal temperature of a mound to increase rapidly during the morning while avoiding overheating from the midday sun. The temperature then remains at a plateau for the rest of the day until the evening.

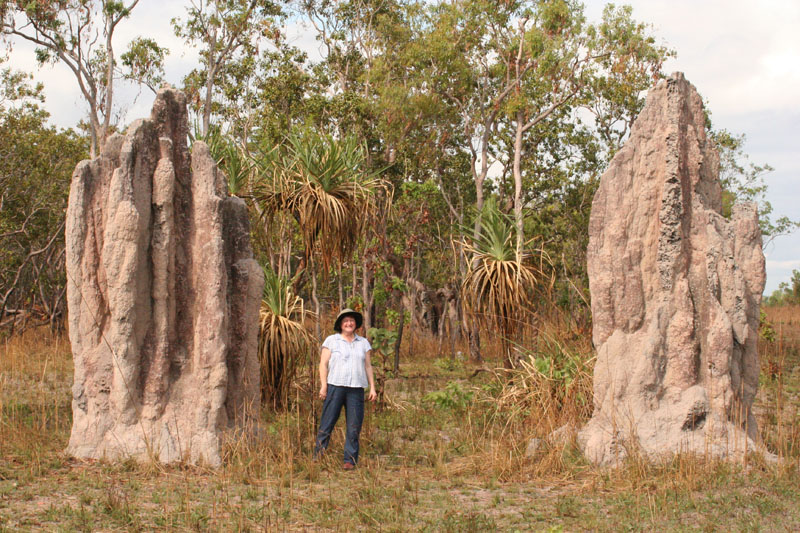
Cathedral mounds in the Northern Territory, Australia

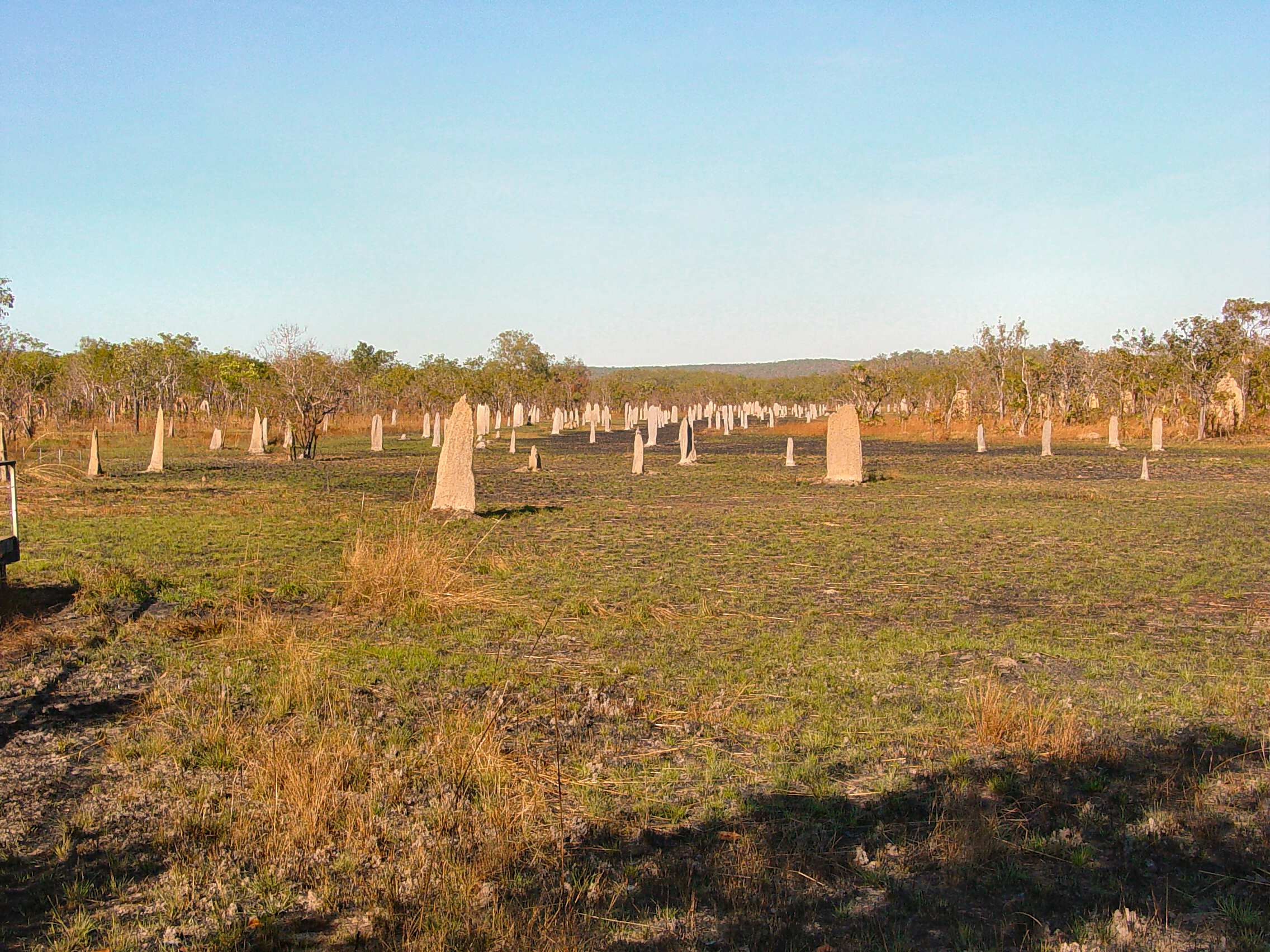
Mounds of "compass" or "magnetic" termites (Amitermes) oriented north–south, thereby avoiding mid-day heat

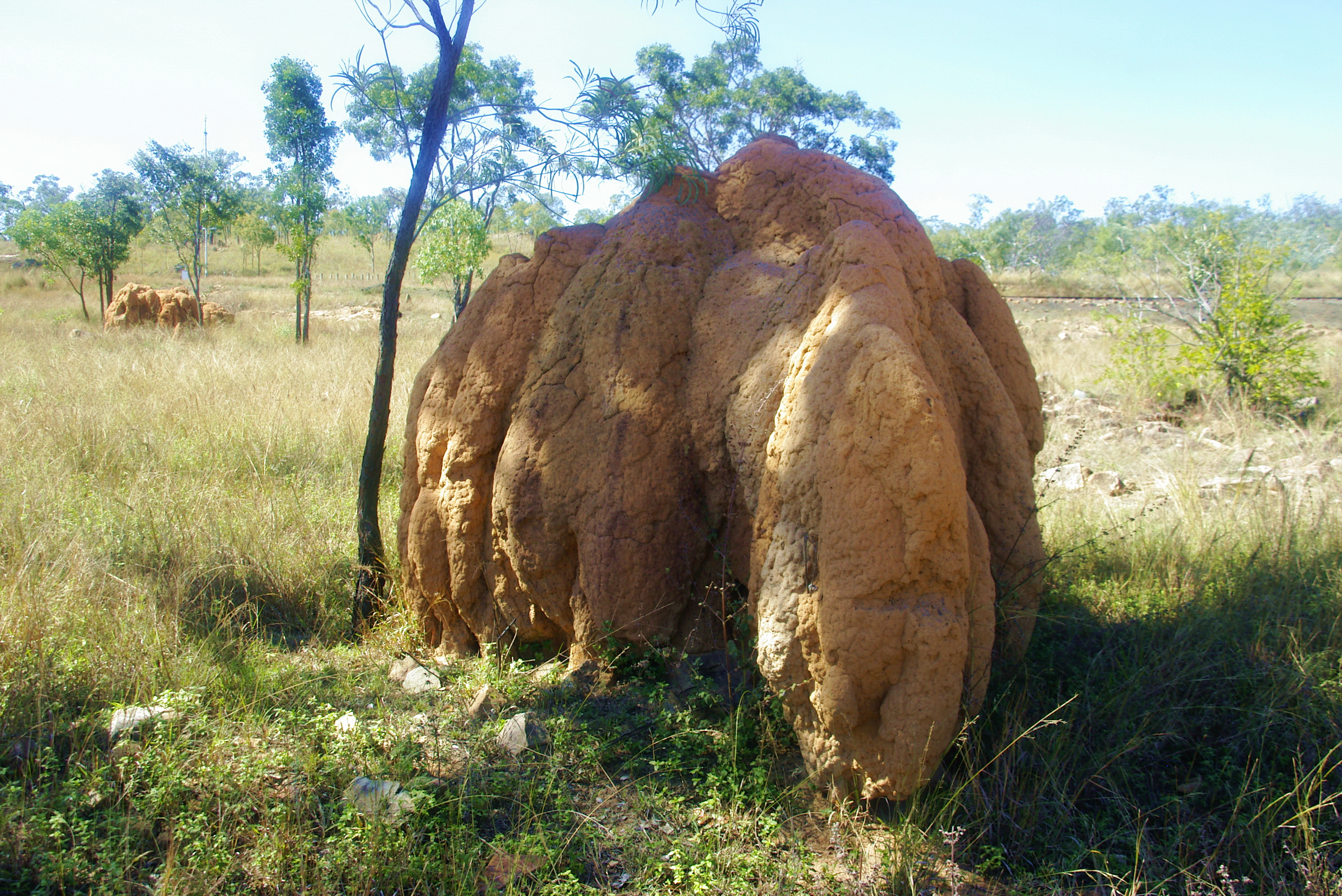
Termite mound in Queensland, Australia

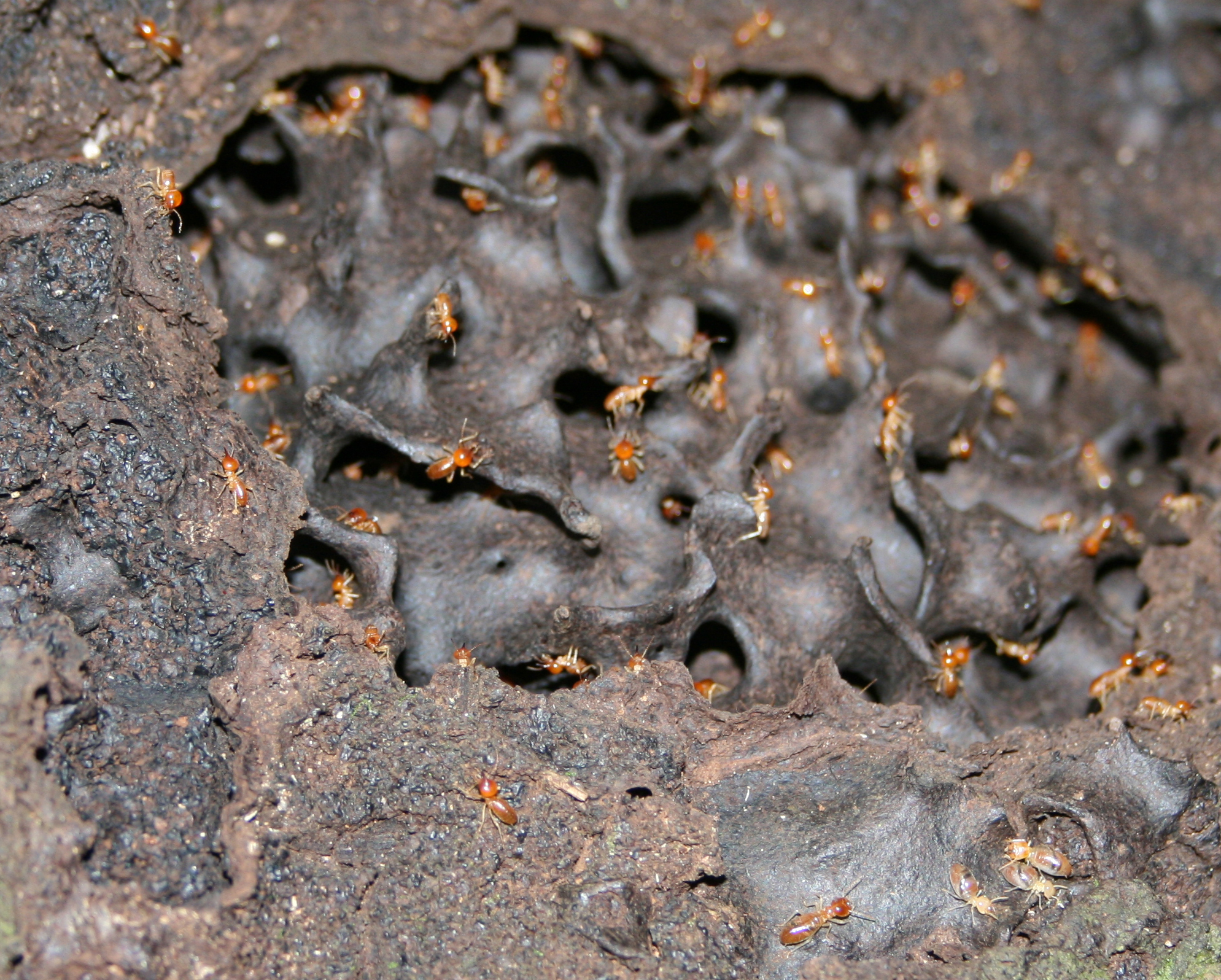
Termites in a mound, Analamazoatra Reserve, Madagascar

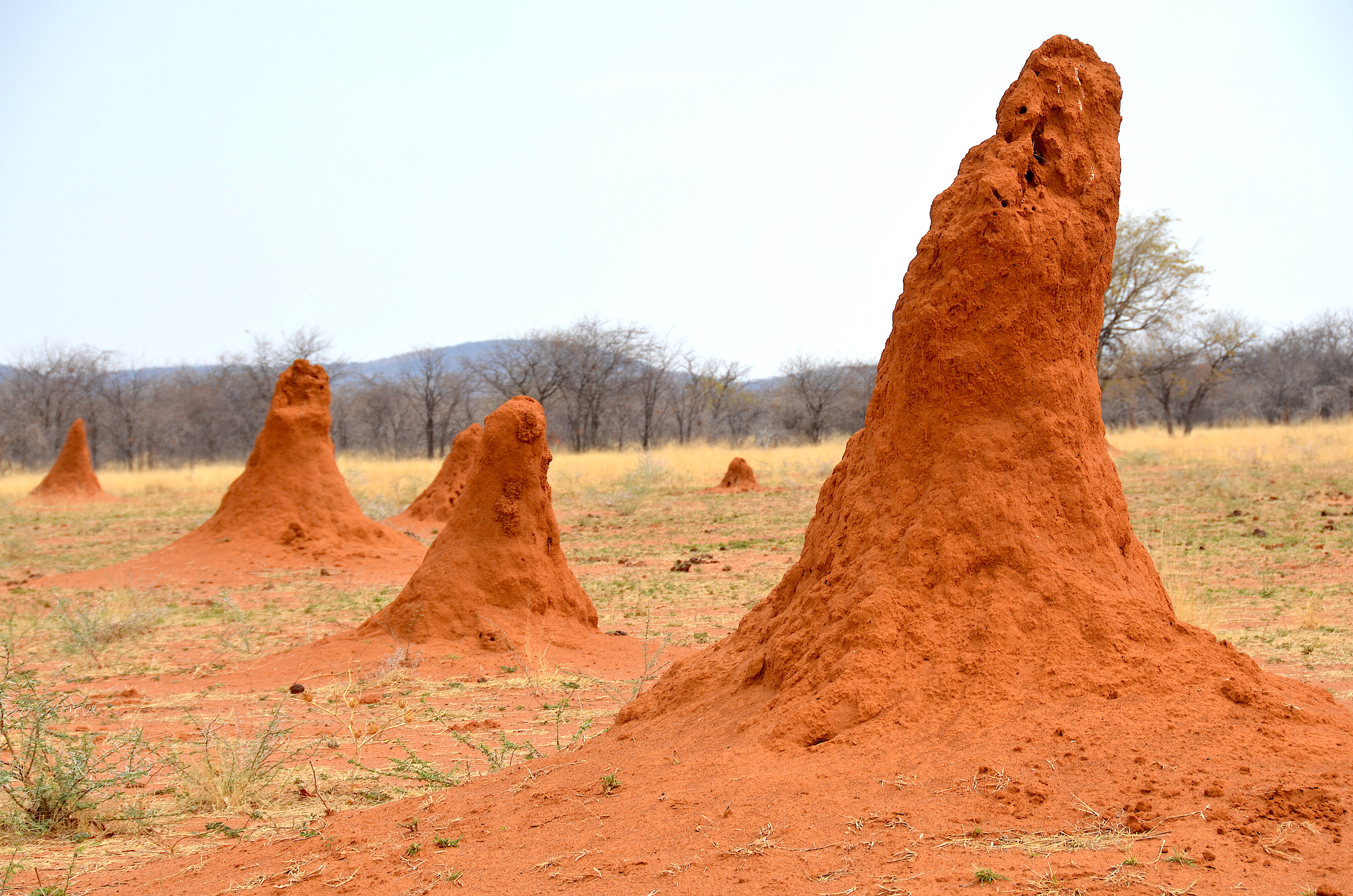
Termite mound in Namibia

=== Shelter tubes ===
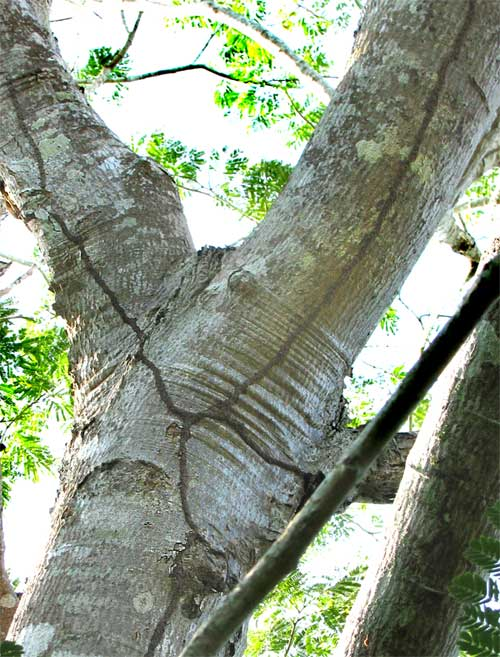
Nasutiterminae shelter tubes on a tree trunk provide cover for the trail from nest to forest floor.

Termites construct shelter tubes, also known as earthen tubes or mud tubes, that start from the ground. These shelter tubes can be found on walls and other structures. Constructed by termites during the night, a time of higher humidity, these tubes provide protection to termites from potential predators, especially ants. Shelter tubes also provide high humidity and darkness and allow workers to collect food sources that cannot be accessed in any other way. These passageways are made from soil and faeces and are normally brown in colour. The size of these shelter tubes depends on the number of food sources that are available. They range from less than 1 cm to several cm in width, but may be dozens of metres in length.

== Relationship with humans ==
=== As pests ===
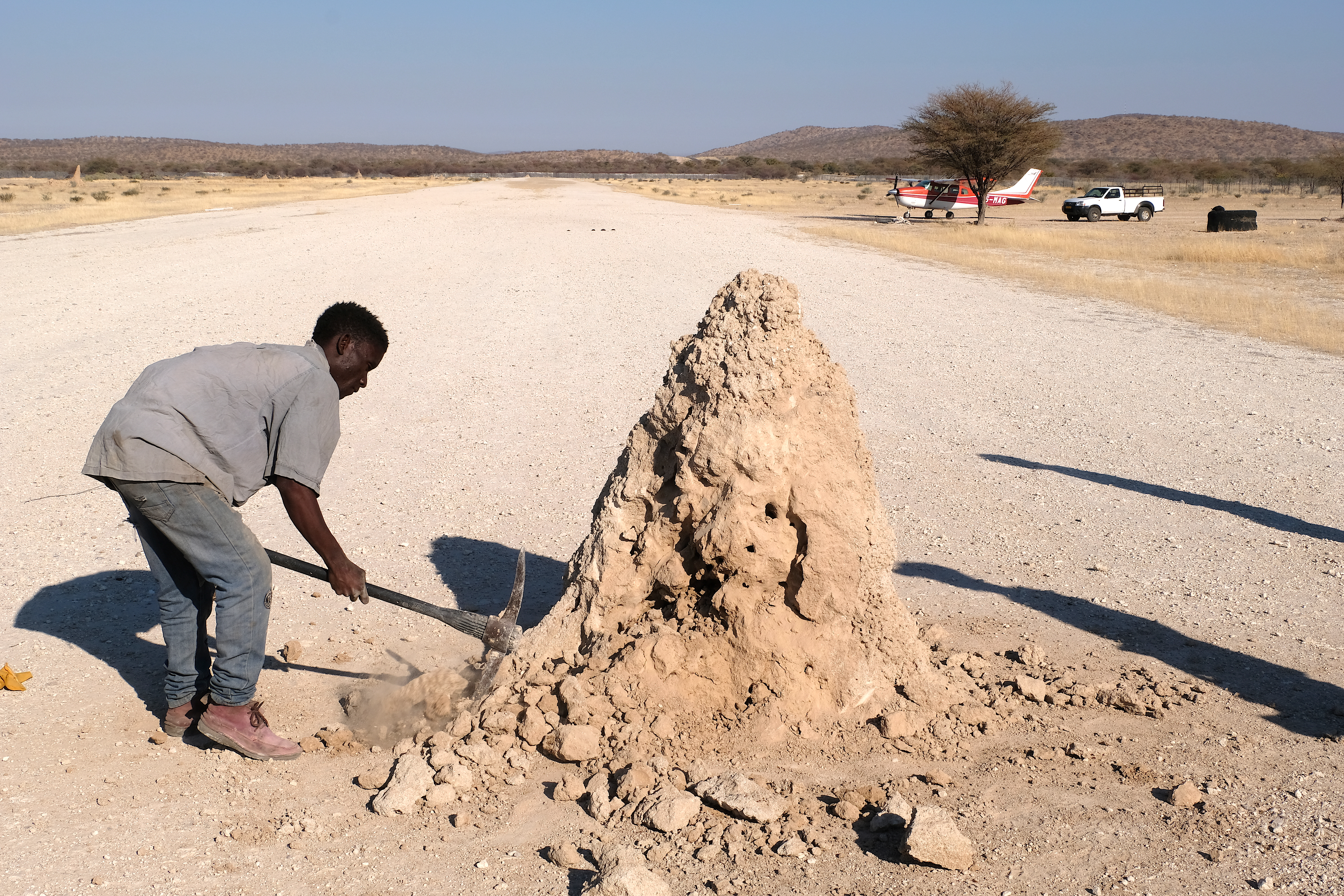
Termite mound as an obstacle on a runway at Khorixas (Namibia)

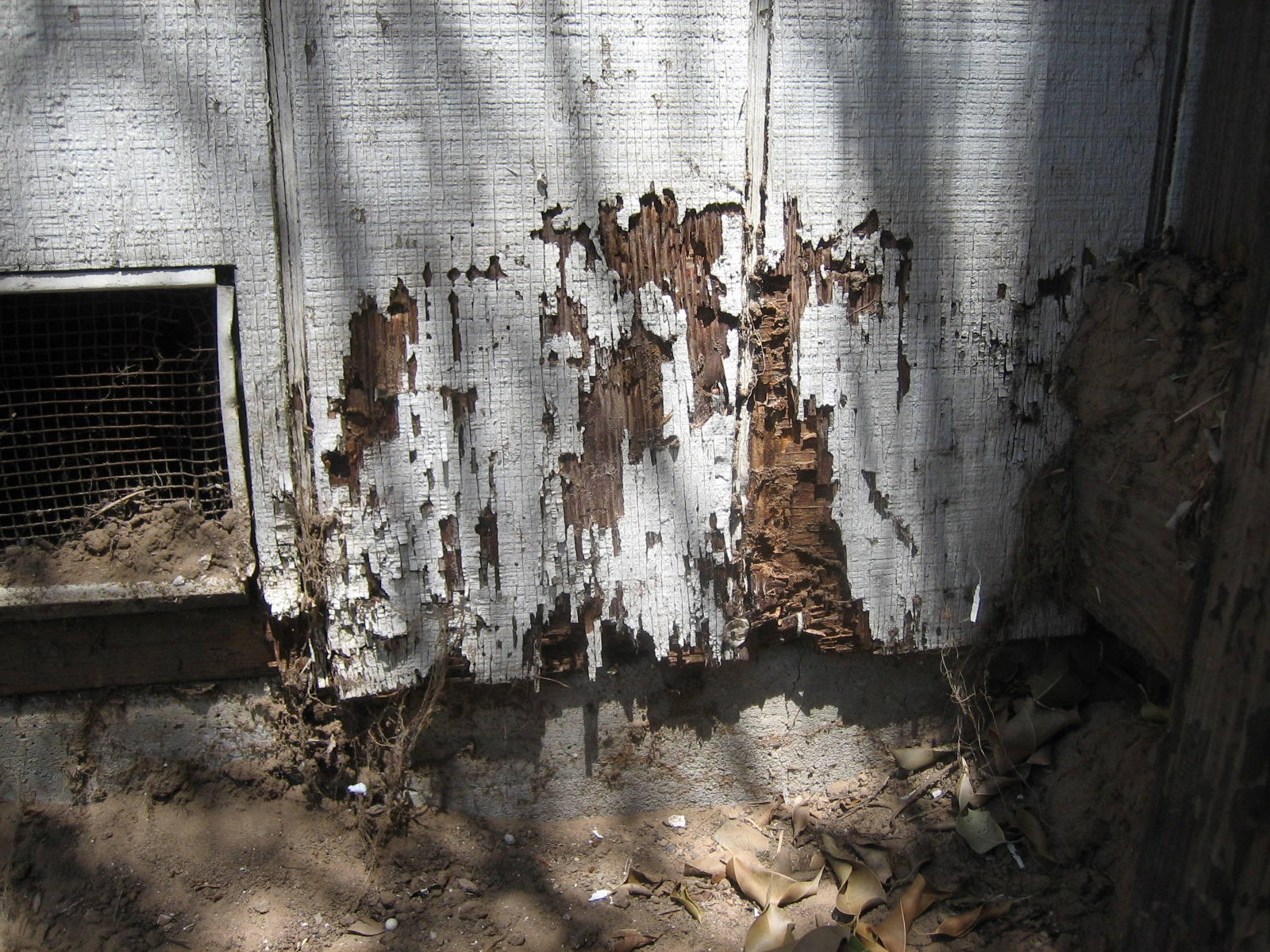
Termite damage on external structure

Owing to their wood-eating habits, many termite species can do significant damage to unprotected buildings and other wooden structures. Termites play an important role as decomposers of wood and vegetative material, and the conflict with humans occurs where structures and landscapes containing structural wood components, cellulose-derived structural materials and ornamental vegetation provide termites with a reliable source of food and moisture. Their habit of remaining concealed often results in their presence being undetected until the timbers are severely damaged, with only a thin exterior layer of wood remaining, which protects them from the environment. Of the 3,106 species known, only 183 species cause damage; 83 species cause significant damage to wooden structures. In North America, 18 subterranean species are pests; in Australia, 16 species have an economic impact; in the Indian subcontinent 26 species are considered pests, and in tropical Africa, 24. In Central America and the West Indies, there are 17 pest species. Among the termite genera, Coptotermes has the highest number of pest species of any genus, with 28 species known to cause damage. Less than 10% of drywood termites are pests, but they infect wooden structures and furniture in tropical, subtropical and other regions. Dampwood termites only attack lumber material exposed to rainfall or soil.

Drywood termites thrive in warm climates, and human activities can enable them to invade homes since they can be transported through contaminated goods, containers and ships. Colonies of termites have been seen thriving in warm buildings located in cold regions. Some termites are considered invasive species. Cryptotermes brevis, the most widely introduced invasive termite species in the world, has been introduced to all the islands in the West Indies and to Australia.

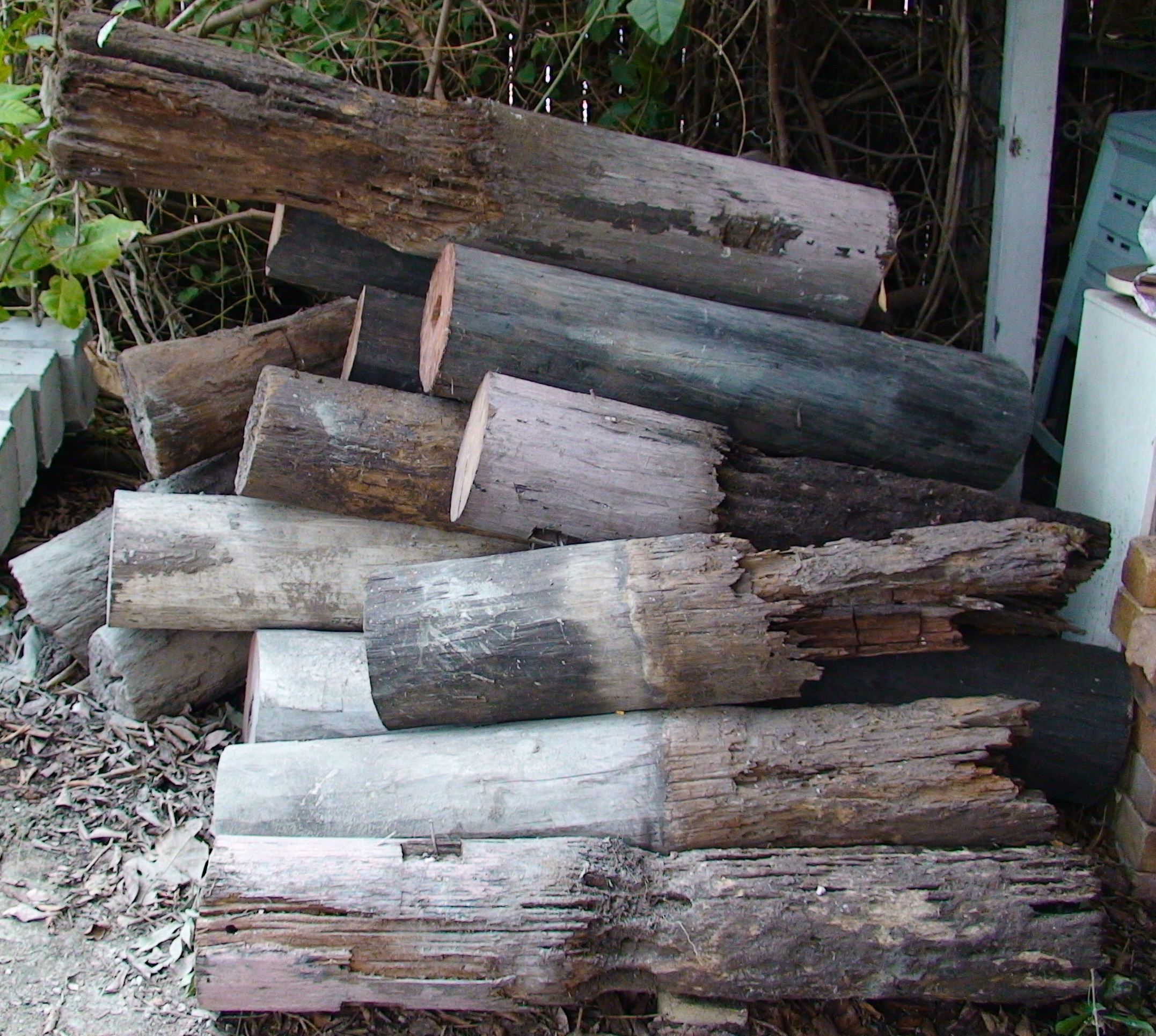
Termite damage in wooden house stumps

In addition to causing damage to buildings, termites can also damage food crops. Termites may attack trees whose resistance to damage is low but generally ignore fast-growing plants. Most attacks occur at harvest time; crops and trees are attacked during the dry season.

In Australia, at a cost of more than A$1.5 billion per year, termites cause more damage to houses than fire, floods and storms combined. In Malaysia, it is estimated that termites caused about RM400 million of damages to properties and buildings. The damage caused by termites costs the southwestern United States approximately $1.5 billion each year in wood structure damage, but the true cost of damage worldwide cannot be determined. Drywood termites are responsible for a large proportion of the damage caused by termites. The goal of termite control is to keep structures and susceptible ornamental plants free from termites. Structures may be homes or business, or elements such as wooden fence posts and telephone poles. Regular and thorough inspections by a trained professional may be necessary to detect termite activity in the absence of more obvious signs like termite swarmers or alates inside or adjacent to a structure. Termite monitors made of wood or cellulose adjacent to a structure may also provide indication of termite foraging activity where it will be in conflict with humans. Termites can be controlled by application of Bordeaux mixture or other substances that contain copper such as chromated copper arsenate. In the United states, application of a soil termiticide with the active ingredient Fipronil, such as Termidor SC or Taurus SC, by a licensed professional, is a common remedy approved by the Environmental Protection Agency for economically significant subterranean termites. A growing demand for alternative, green, and "more natural" extermination methods has increased demand for mechanical and biological control methods such as orange oil.

To better control the population of termites, various methods have been developed to track termite movements. One early method involved distributing termite bait laced with immunoglobulin G (IgG) marker proteins from rabbits or chickens. Termites collected from the field could be tested for the rabbit-IgG markers using a rabbit-IgG-specific assay. More recently developed, less expensive alternatives include tracking the termites using egg white, cow milk, or soy milk proteins, which can be sprayed on termites in the field. Termites bearing these proteins can be traced using a protein-specific ELISA test. RNAi insecticides specific to termites are in development. One factor reducing investment in its research and development is concern about high potential for resistance evolution.

In 1994, termites, of the species Reticulitermes grassei, were identified in two bungalows in Saunton, Devon. Anecdotal evidence suggests the infestation could date back 70 years before the official identification. There are reports that gardeners had seen white ants and that a greenhouse had had to be replaced in the past. The Saunton infestation was the first and only colony ever recorded in the UK. In 1998, Termite Eradication Programme was set up, with the intention of containing and eradicating the colony. The TEP was managed by the Ministry of Housing, Communities and Local Government. The TEP used "insect growth regulators" to prevent the termites from reaching maturity and reproducing. In 2021, the UK's Termite Eradication Programme announced the eradication of the colony, the first time a country has eradicated termites.

=== As food ===
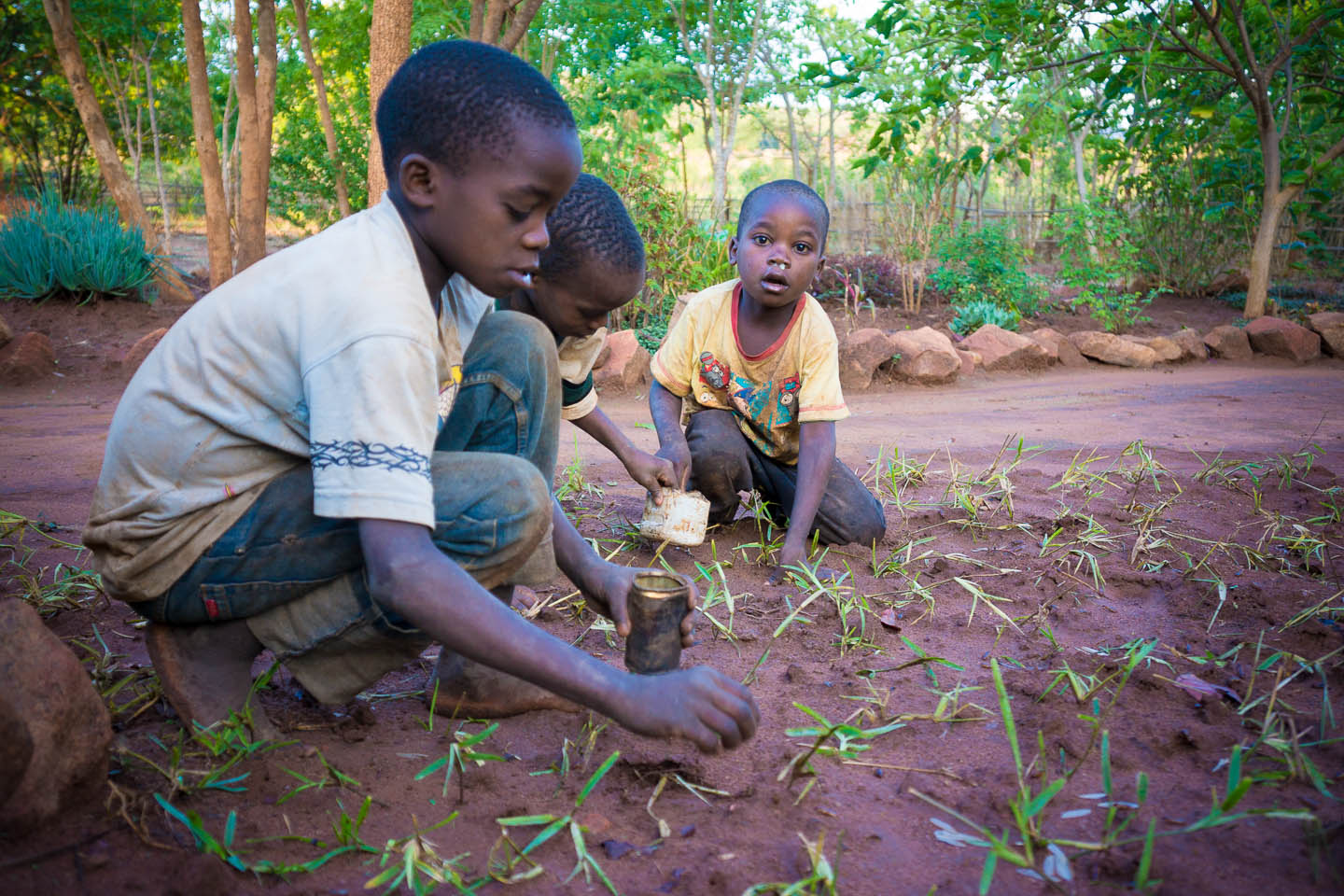
Mozambican boys from the Yawo tribe collecting flying termites

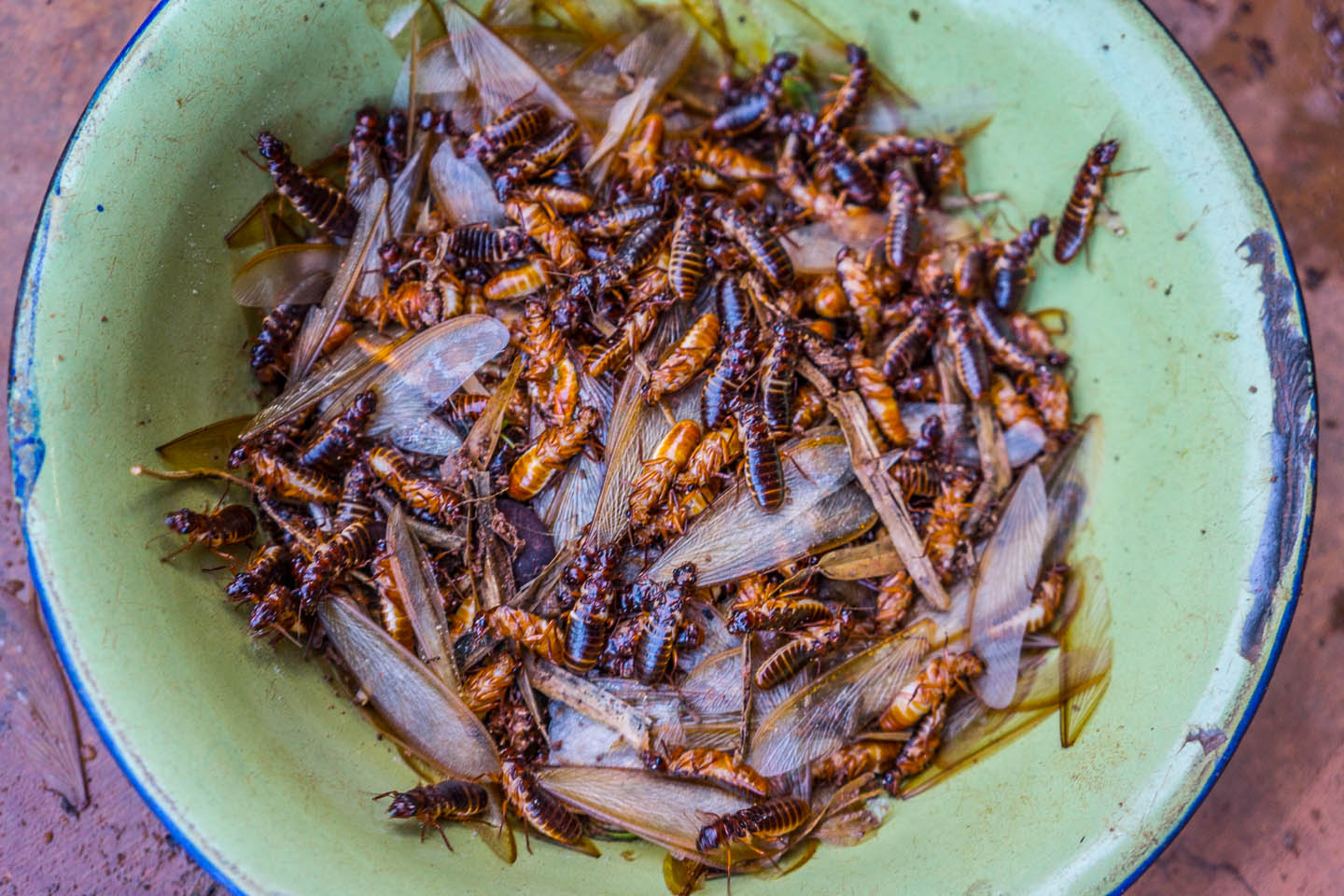
These flying alates were collected as they came out of their nests in the ground during the early days of the rainy season.

43 termite species are used as food by humans or are fed to livestock. These insects are particularly important in impoverished countries where malnutrition is common, as the protein from termites can help improve the human diet. Termites are consumed in many regions globally, but this practice has only become popular in developed nations in recent years.

Termites are consumed by people in many different cultures around the world. In many parts of Africa, the alates are an important factor in the diets of native populations. Groups have different ways of collecting or cultivating insects; sometimes collecting soldiers from several species. Though harder to acquire, queens are regarded as a delicacy. Termite alates are high in nutrition with adequate levels of fat and protein. They are regarded as pleasant in taste, having a nut-like flavour after they are cooked.

Alates are collected when the rainy season begins. During a nuptial flight, they are typically seen around lights to which they are attracted, and so nets are set up on lamps and captured alates are later collected. The wings are removed through a technique that is similar to winnowing. The best result comes when they are lightly roasted on a hot plate or fried until crisp. Oil is not required as their bodies usually contain sufficient amounts of oil. Termites are typically eaten when livestock is lean and tribal crops have not yet developed or produced any food, or if food stocks from a previous growing season are limited.

In addition to Africa, termites are consumed in local or tribal areas in Asia and North and South America. In Australia, Indigenous Australians are aware that termites are edible but do not consume them even in times of scarcity; there are few explanations as to why. Termite mounds are the main sources of soil consumption (geophagy) in many countries including Kenya, Tanzania, Zambia, Zimbabwe and South Africa. Researchers have suggested that termites are suitable candidates for human consumption and space agriculture, as they are high in protein and can be used to convert inedible waste to consumable products for humans.

=== In agriculture ===
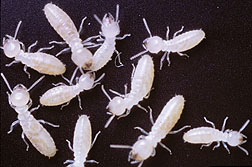
Scientists have developed a more affordable method of tracing the movement of termites using traceable proteins.

Termites can be major agricultural pests, particularly in East Africa and North Asia, where crop losses can be severe (3–100% in crop loss in Africa). Counterbalancing this is the greatly improved water infiltration where termite tunnels in the soil allow rainwater to soak in deeply, which helps reduce runoff and consequent soil erosion through bioturbation. In South America, cultivated plants such as eucalyptus, upland rice and sugarcane can be severely damaged by termite infestations, with attacks on leaves, roots and woody tissue. Termites can also attack other plants, including cassava, coffee, cotton, fruit trees, maize, peanuts, soybeans and vegetables. Mounds can disrupt farming activities, making it difficult for farmers to operate farming machinery; however, despite farmers' dislike of the mounds, it is often the case that no net loss of production occurs. Termites can be beneficial to agriculture, such as by boosting crop yields and enriching the soil. Termites and ants can re-colonise untilled land that contains crop stubble, which colonies use for nourishment when they establish their nests. The presence of nests in fields enables larger amounts of rainwater to soak into the ground and increases the amount of nitrogen in the soil, both essential for the growth of crops.

=== In science and technology ===
The termite gut has inspired various research efforts aimed at replacing fossil fuels with cleaner, renewable energy sources. Termites are efficient bioreactors, theoretically capable of producing two litres of hydrogen from a single sheet of paper. Approximately 200 species of microbes live inside the termite hindgut, releasing the hydrogen that was trapped inside wood and plants that they digest. Through the action of unidentified enzymes in the termite gut, lignocellulose polymers are broken down into sugars and are transformed into hydrogen. The bacteria within the gut turns the sugar and hydrogen into cellulose acetate, an acetate ester of cellulose on which termites rely for energy. Community DNA sequencing of the microbes in the termite hindgut has been employed to provide a better understanding of the metabolic pathway. Genetic engineering may enable hydrogen to be generated in bioreactors from woody biomass.

The development of autonomous robots capable of constructing intricate structures without human assistance has been inspired by the complex mounds that termites build. These robots work independently and can move by themselves on a tracked grid, capable of climbing and lifting up bricks. Such robots may be useful for future projects on Mars, or for building levees to prevent flooding.

Termites use sophisticated means to control the temperatures of their mounds. As discussed above, the shape and orientation of the mounds of the Australian compass termite stabilises their internal temperatures during the day. As the towers heat up, the solar chimney effect (stack effect) creates an updraft of air within the mound. Wind blowing across the tops of the towers enhances the circulation of air through the mounds, which also include side vents in their construction. The solar chimney effect has been in use for centuries in the Middle East and Near East for passive cooling, as well as in Europe by the Romans. It is only relatively recently, however, that climate responsive construction techniques have become incorporated into modern architecture. Especially in Africa, the stack effect has become a popular means to achieve natural ventilation and passive cooling in modern buildings.

=== In culture ===
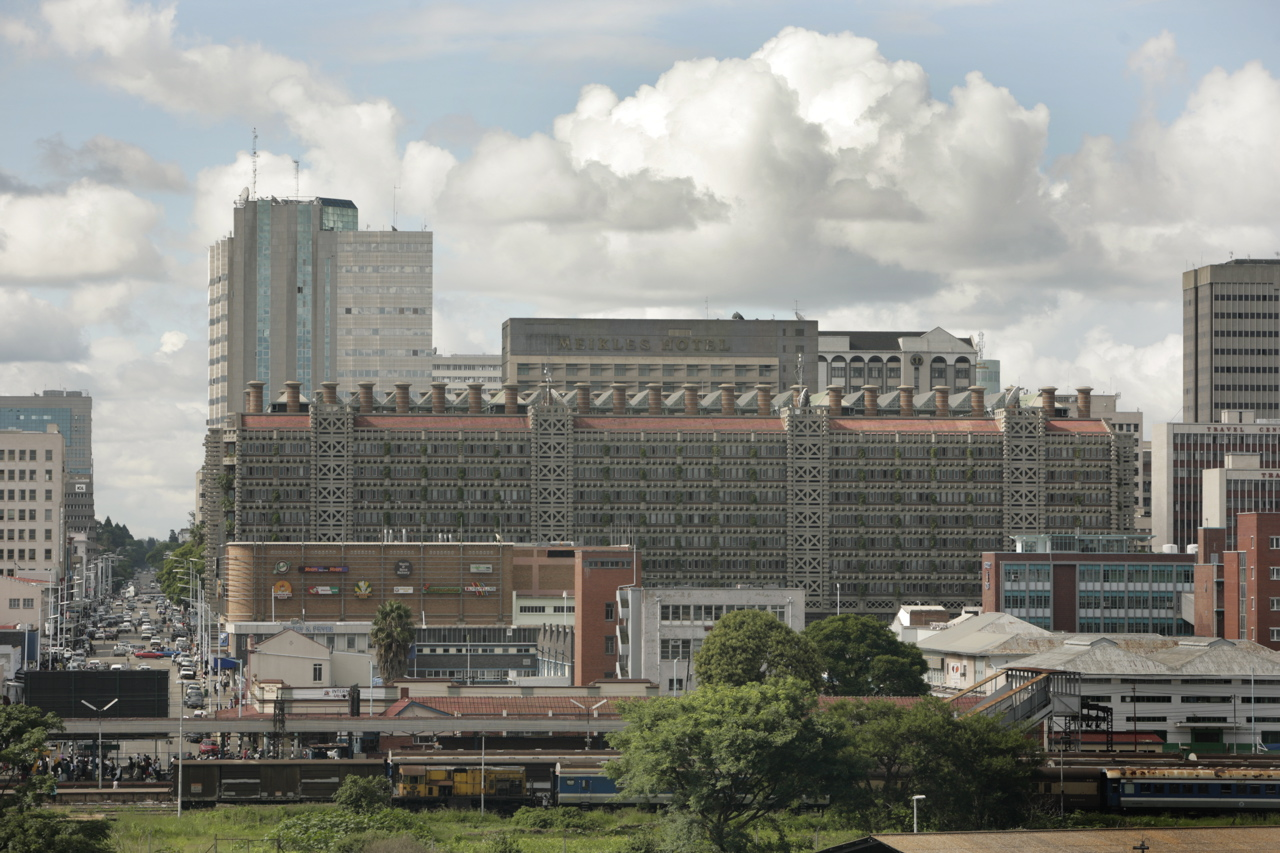
The pink-hued Eastgate Centre

The Eastgate Centre is a shopping centre and office block in central Harare, Zimbabwe, whose architect, Mick Pearce, used passive cooling inspired by that used by the local termites. It was the first major building exploiting termite-inspired cooling techniques to attract international attention. Other such buildings include the Learning Resource Center at the Catholic University of Eastern Africa and the Council House 2 building in Melbourne, Australia.

Few zoos hold termites, due to the difficulty in keeping them captive and to the reluctance of authorities to permit potential pests. One of the few that do, the Zoo Basel in Switzerland, has two thriving Macrotermes bellicosus populations – resulting in an event very rare in captivity: the mass migrations of young flying termites. This happened in September 2008, when thousands of male termites left their mound each night, died, and covered the floors and water pits of the house holding their exhibit.

African tribes in several countries have termites as totems, and for this reason tribe members are forbidden to eat the reproductive alates. Termites are widely used in traditional popular medicine; they are used as treatments for diseases and other conditions such as asthma, bronchitis, hoarseness, influenza, sinusitis, tonsillitis and whooping cough. In Nigeria, Macrotermes nigeriensis is used for spiritual protection and to treat wounds and sick pregnant women. In Southeast Asia, termites are used in ritual practices. In Malaysia, Singapore and Thailand, termite mounds are commonly worshiped among the populace. Abandoned mounds are viewed as structures created by spirits and inhabited by a local guardian; this is known as Keramat and Datok Kong. In urban areas, local residents construct red-painted shrines over mounds that have been abandoned, where they pray for good health, protection and luck.

== See also ==
- Mound-building termites
- Stigmergy
- Termite shield
- Xylophagy
