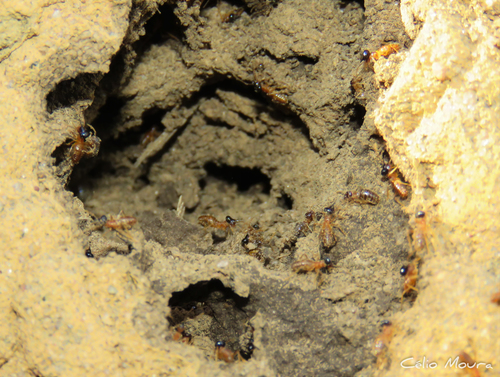

Scientific classification
- Kingdom: Animalia
- Phylum: Arthropoda
- Class: Insecta
- Order: Blattodea
- Infraorder: Isoptera
- Family: Termitidae
- Genus: Constrictotermes
- Species: C. cyphergaster

Binomial name
- Constrictotermes cyphergaster (Silvestri, 1901)

= Constrictotermes cyphergaster =

Species of termite

Constrictotermes cyphergaster is a Neotropical species of open-air foraging nasute termite within the genus Constrictotermes. This species is distributed widely throughout South America and lives within xeric habitats such as the savannas found in Paraguay, Bolivia, Central Brazil, and Northern Argentina. C. cyphergaster primarily builds arboreal and transient epigeic nests and mainly consumes dead woods at varying stages of decomposition.

== Biology ==
Nests of C. cyphergaster are mostly arboreal and are typically found between 0.4 and 3 meters high on a host tree. The nests vary between a reddish brown and grayish brown in color, are oval and the texture of the surface is reticulated. Growth and proliferation of nests coincides with seasonal changes. Most of the new small nests that emerge during the wet season are satellite colonies, which is associated with increased seasonal polycalism within C. cyphergaster. In the Caatinga region of Brazil, common host trees include Croton blanchetianus, where most new small nests are found on, and Caesalpinia pyramidalis, which have a higher percentage of large nests. Some nests are more epigeic - i.e. present on the ground. Epigeic nests are associated with ephemeral residence and are believed to be satellite constructions of nearby colonies serving as refuge for workers moving in-between nests and possibly for storing food. The largest recorded population for a nest of C. cyphergaster was around 118,000 individuals, with a soldier:worker ratio of 1:2.8 respectively.

Constrictotermes cyphergaster is primarily active during the night and early morning where it forms extensive foraging columns out in the open via one or two openings from the nest. Soldiers spearhead column formation 30 minutes before the arrival of workers within the foraging exodus. Leading soldiers branch off different routes from the main foraging column, while soldiers upstream assume defensive positions at the flanks of the foraging column to protect inbound workers. Once a feeding spot is located (typically a rotted tree trunk or branch), workers will gather around and consume material before returning with their new forage stored in their gut (unlike their Indomalayan counterparts which carry back food in their mandibles). On average, colonies forage over an area of 369.6±242.7 m^{2} during the dry season and 190.8±170.1 m^{2} during the wet season. The number of individuals involved in foraging varies by season with the largest number of workers involved in a single session, an estimated 87,000 individuals, being observed during a foraging bout in the wet season while during the dry season the largest recorded was 51,000 individuals. A maximum trail length of 18.5 meters was also observed for C. cyphergaster, which is smaller than the values recorded for other species of open-foraging termite.

Foraging bouts are most frequent during the wet season and less so in the dry season, coinciding with seasonal variation in the availability of resources and foraging cycles. Somewhat contradictory, the biomass of colonies were observed to increase during the dry season, likely due to increased production of reproductive individuals (alates). Presumably the termites in preparation for adverse conditions forage more frequently in the wet season when resources are plentiful and when conditions are more favorable for foraging. Collected food is then stored within cells of the inner basal portion of the nest. These cells contain a dark material — digested balls of cellulose, which contain a high diversity of lignocellulosic ascomycetes fungi which help nutritionally enrich the food stores. The larvae of C. cyphergaster presumably feeds on these food stores, as well as Inquiline species of termite.

=== Reproduction ===
Colonies swarm in the following months: March, April, and May. The fully claustral royal pair likely found colonies within the ground which migrate to form arboreal nests later during the colony's lifecycle.
