= Rhynchotermes =

Scientific classification
- Kingdom: Animalia
- Phylum: Arthropoda
- Class: Insecta
- Order: Blattodea
- Infraorder: Isoptera
- Family: Termitidae
- Subfamily: Syntermitinae
- Genus: Rhynchotermes; Holmgren, 1912

Genus of insects

Rhynchotermes is a genus of Neotropical higher termites within the subfamily Syntermitinae, represented by 8 known species. Species of this genus are known for their soldiers which have highly developed sickle-shaped mandibles and a pronounced frontal tube superficially analogous to the fontanellar guns of true nasute termites. Most species forage above the surface in the open where they primarily feed on forest leaf litter. Nests are subterranean or are shallow and epigeic.

== Description ==
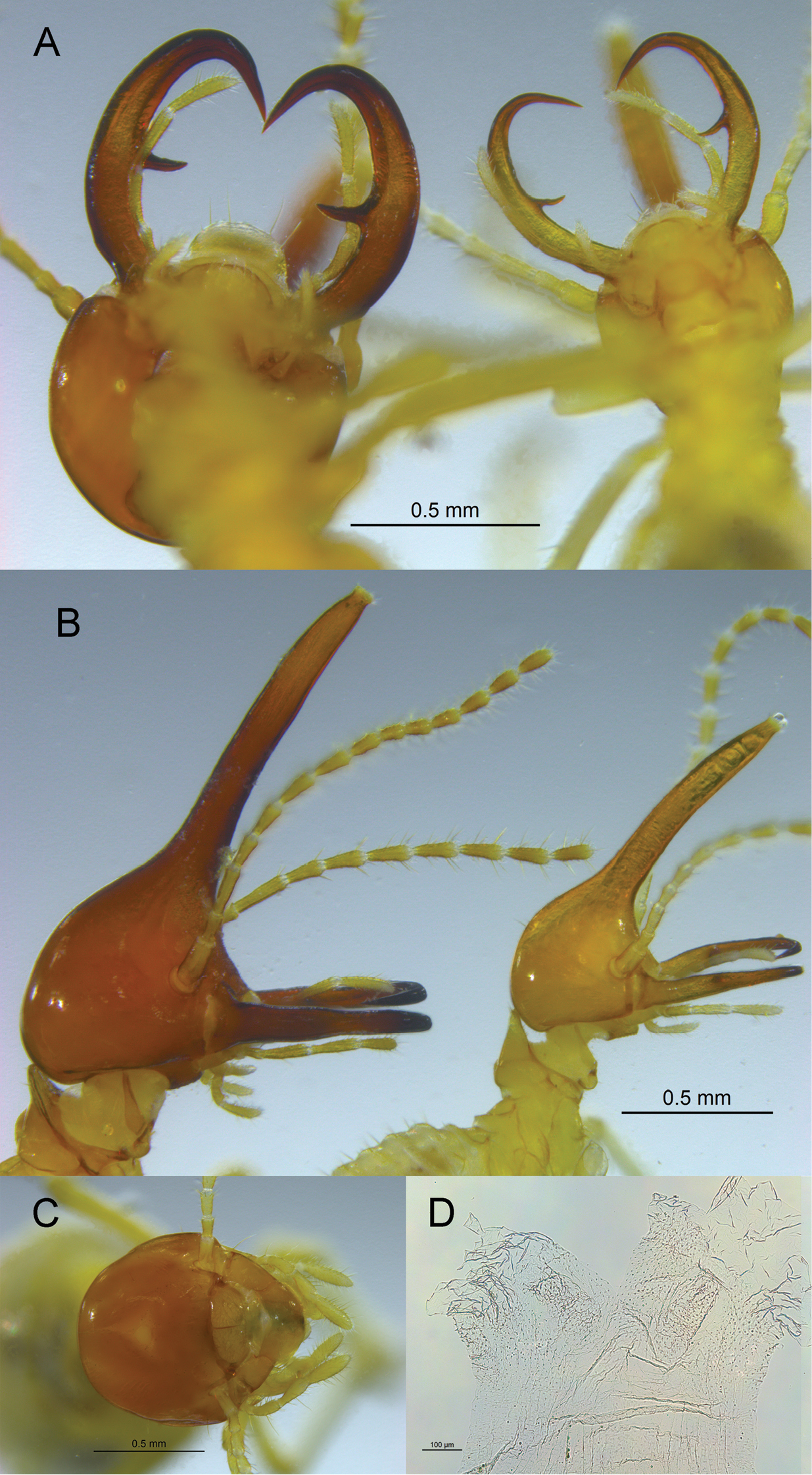

Worker, Soldier and Imago have antennae with 14 articles (antennomeres) with the first and third articles longer than the second.

Soldiers are smaller than workers, are either monomorphic or dimorphic and the head capsule is rounded to a near pear shape. The inner margins of the mandibles are either serrated or smooth, strongly or evenly curved and the inner marginal tooth is conical. Apical extent of mandibles either weakly overlapping or evenly distanced when closed. The frontal tube about the same length of the head or longer and always covering the post-clypeus in dorsal view. Forecoxa process often pronounced and subcylindrical.

Worker head capsule is rounded when viewed dorsally and flattened dorso-ventrally; head is highly sclerotized. Left mandible with small apical tooth slightly shorter than M1+2, cutting margin between tip of M1+2 and third marginal tooth and molar prominence with 5–6 developed ridges. Right mandible with apical tooth almost equal in size to M1, acute angle between them, M1 and M2 robust and molar plate with 5–6 ridges. Intestines visible; abdomen transparent.

Species are distributed widely throughout the Neotropics, being found in Argentina, Belize, Bolivia, Brazil, Colombia, Costa Rica, Ecuador, Guatemala, Panama, Paraguay and Peru.

== Species ==
1. Rhynchotermes amazonensis
2. Rhynchotermes bulbinasus
3. Rhynchotermes diphyes
4. Rhynchotermes matraga
5. Rhynchotermes nasutissimus
6. Rhynchotermes perarmatus
7. Rhynchotermes piauy
8. Rhynchotermes armatus
