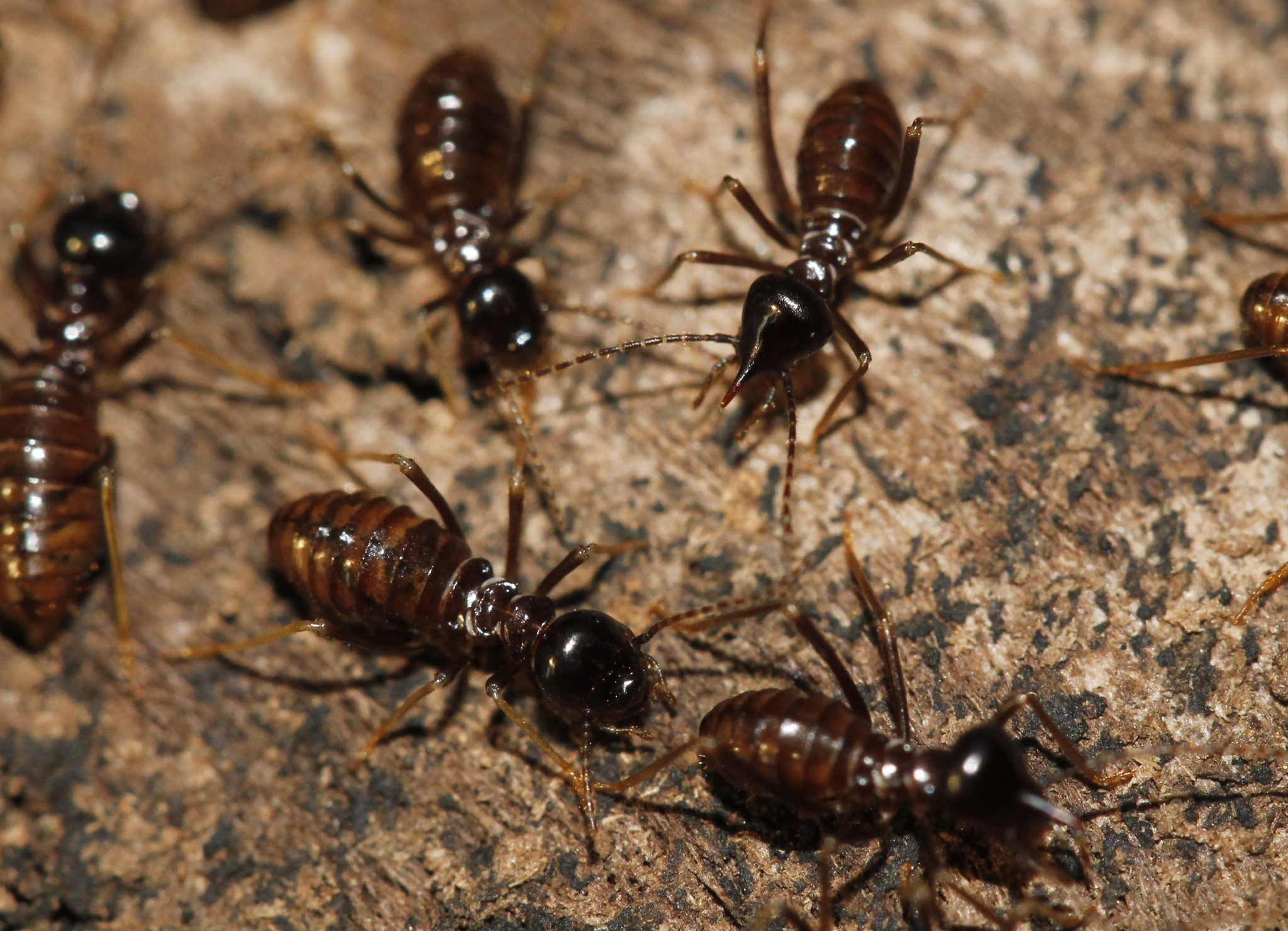

Scientific classification
- Kingdom: Animalia
- Phylum: Arthropoda
- Clade: Pancrustacea
- Class: Insecta
- Order: Blattodea
- Infraorder: Isoptera
- Nanorder: Geoisoptera
- Family: Termitidae
- Subfamily: Nasutitermitinae
- Genus: Hospitalitermes
- Species: H. monoceros

Binomial name
- Hospitalitermes monoceros (König, 1779)

Synonyms
- Termes monoceros atrum König 1779

= Hospitalitermes monoceros =

Species of termite

Hospitalitermes monoceros, is a species of nasute termite of the genus Hospitalitermes. It was originally considered to be endemic to Sri Lanka, but was also found in India in 2013. It is an obligate lichen feeder. It is recorded from Cassia multijuga and Ficus religiosa trees and is a pest of tea.
