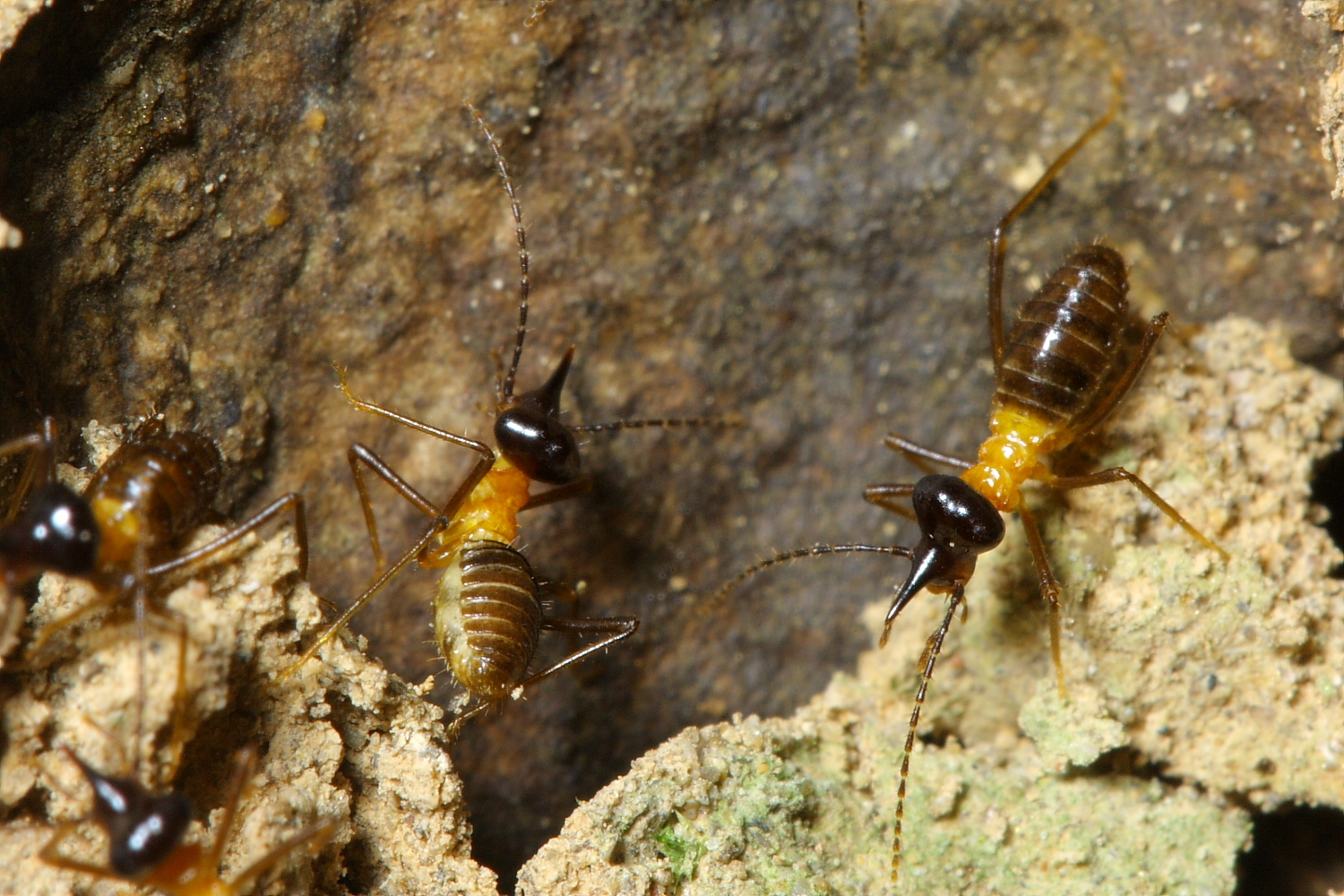

Scientific classification
- Kingdom: Animalia
- Phylum: Arthropoda
- Clade: Pancrustacea
- Class: Insecta
- Order: Blattodea
- Infraorder: Isoptera
- Family: Termitidae
- Genus: Constrictotermes
- Species: C. cavifrons

Binomial name
- Constrictotermes cavifrons (Holmgren, 1910)

= Constrictotermes cavifrons =

Species of termite

Constrictotermes cavifrons is a species of Amazonian nasute termite within the genus Constrictotermes. It forms large and diurnal open-foraging trails to and from its sources of food which consists largely of lichens and other microepiphytes. The nests of C. cavifrons are arboreal and characterized by a cleared central runway from which foraging raids begin.

== Description ==
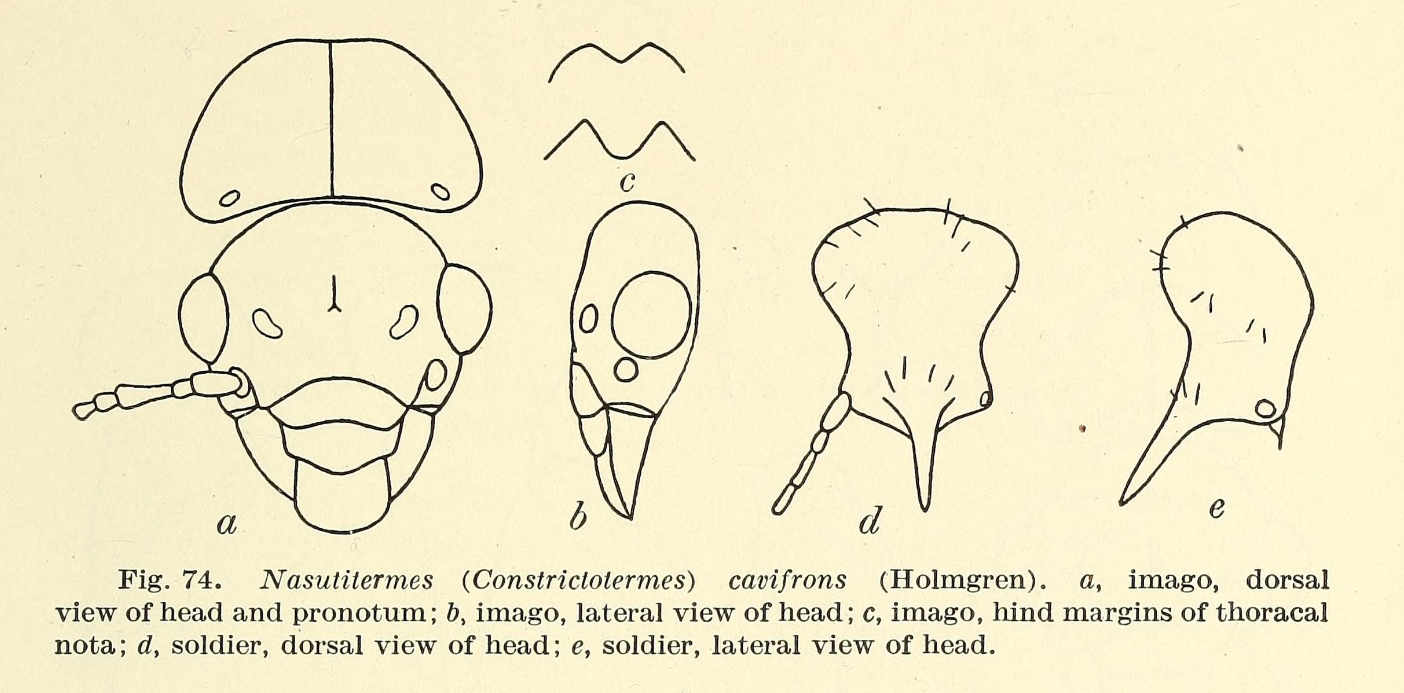
Illustrations of C. cavifrons imago and soldier

The soldiers have antennae with 13 – 14 articles (antennomeres) and the length of the head ranges between 1.25 – 1.50 mm. The head and abdomen segments are pigmented dark in contrast to the conspicuously yellowish thorax, matching the coloration of workers. Soldiers of this species molt from sclerotized worker-like forms which are slightly smaller than the actual workers but otherwise appear to behave no differently. The head of the presoldier form measures between 0.839 – 0.887 mm while workers range between 0.936 – 1.036 mm. The slit-shaped fontanelle of the presoldier form is also larger and more defined. During the molt the third and fourth antenna segments fuse and all antenna segments post-molt are more elongated than in the presoldier worker-like form.

The imago of this species has a brownish black, broadly oval head capsule which is sparsely covered by long hair. The fontanelle is slit-shaped and forks at the tip. The antennae consists of 15 segments with the second article equal in length to the fourth; third article is more than double the length of the 2nd article. Eyes and ocelli are large and the postclypeus is black brown with no distinct median line. The wings are a dark smokey color and the venation is conspicuous. Length with wings included is 17 – 19 mm, body length excluding wings is between 8 – 10 mm.

=== Nest ===
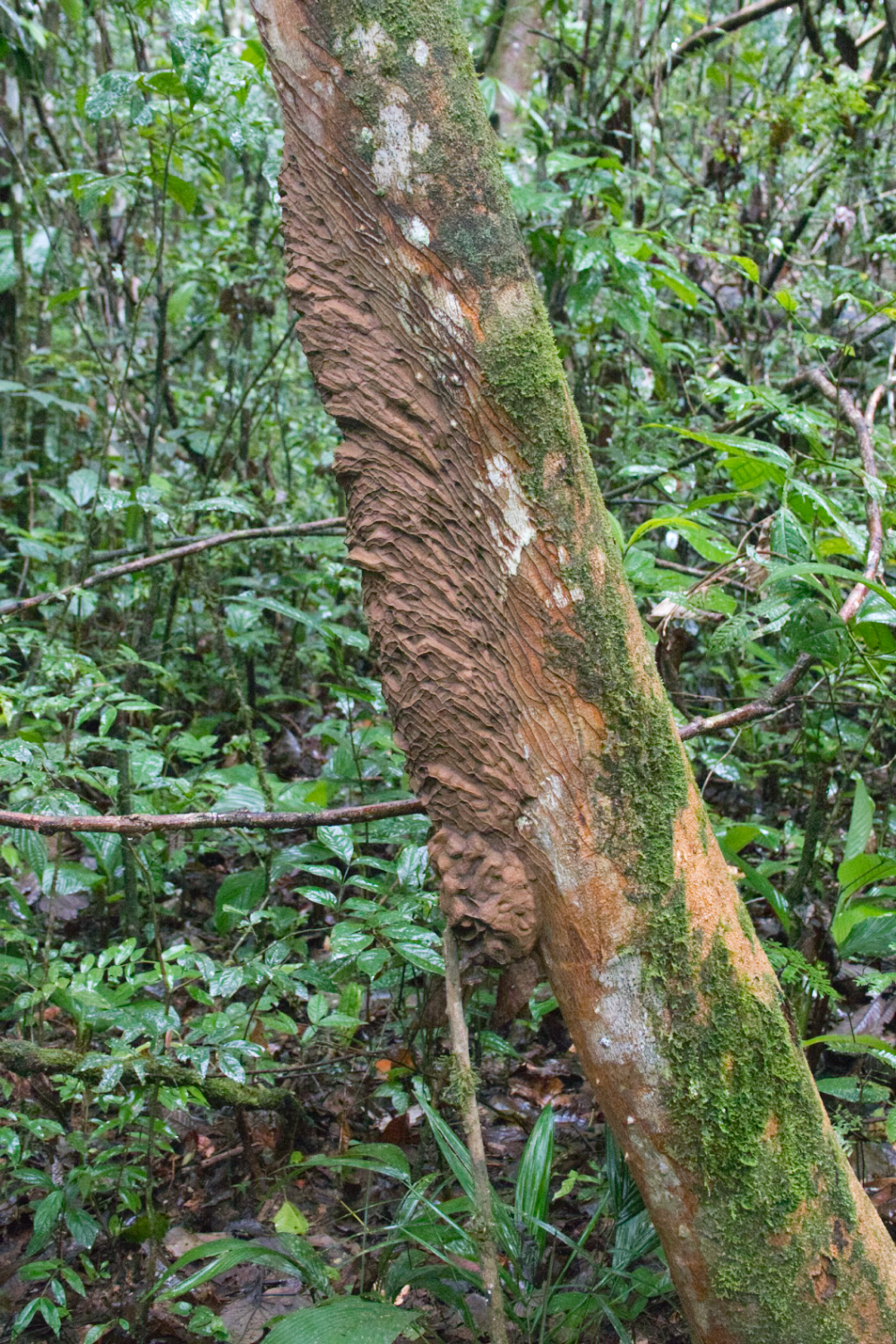
Nest of C. cavifrons

The nests are arboreal and typically found 10 meters high on a host tree. Unlike the nests of other arboreal species which are dark in color indicative of significant lignocellulose content, the nests of C. cavifrons have lighter coloration indicating a higher amount of mineral soil used in their construction. Nests are mainly characterized by their elongate shape that tapers into a central runway which is either flanked by gallery walls on either side and/or by downward sloping narrow ridges. These narrow ridges are the most diagnostic feature of their nests, and are believed to aid in diverting rainfall from the central runway.
