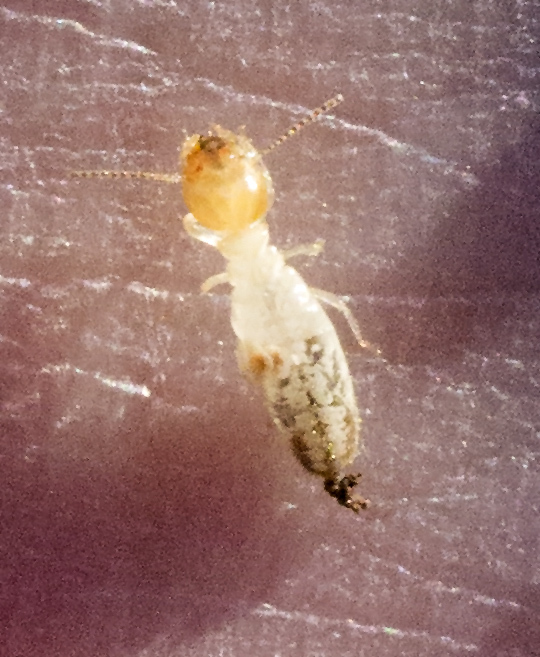

Scientific classification
- Domain: Eukaryota
- Kingdom: Animalia
- Phylum: Arthropoda
- Class: Insecta
- Order: Blattodea
- Infraorder: Isoptera
- Family: Termitidae
- Subfamily: Termitinae
- Genus: Gnathamitermes; Light, 1932

Diversity
- 4 species

= Gnathamitermes =

Genus of termites

Gnathamitermes is a genus of termites in the family Termitidae. There are about six described species in Gnathamitermes.

== Species ==
These six species belong to the genus Gnathamitermes:

- Gnathamitermes grandis (Light, 1930)
- Gnathamitermes magnoculus Light, 1932
- Gnathamitermes nigriceps (Light, 1930)
- Gnathamitermes perplexus (Banks in Banks & Snyder, 1920) (long-jawed desert termites)
- Gnathamitermes rousei Pierce, 1958
- Gnathamitermes tubiformans (Buckley, 1862)
