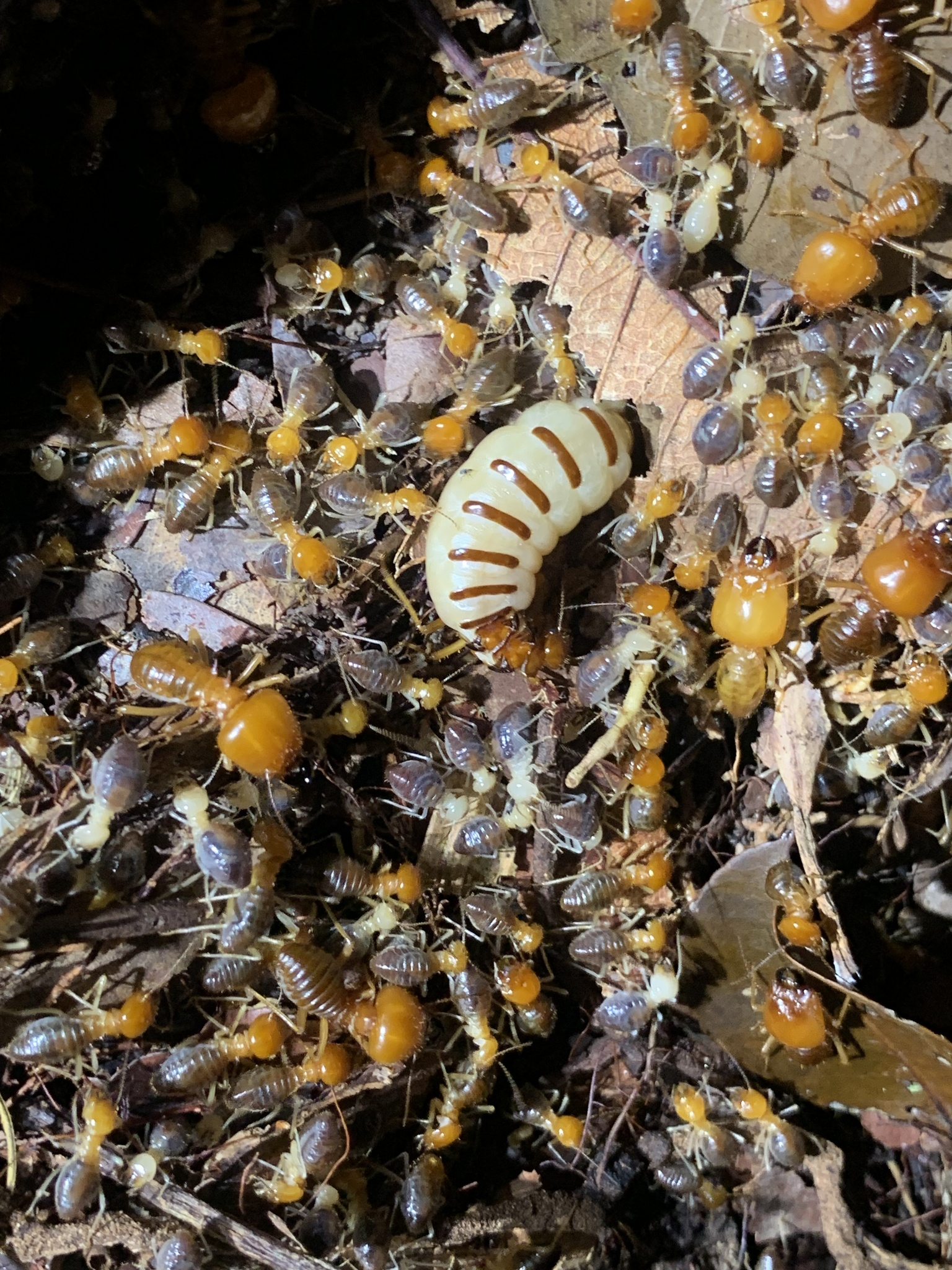
- Syntermes spinosus colony with queen pictured, from the Amazonas region of Brazil. The colony has evacuated the nest likely due to flooding.

Scientific classification
- Domain: Eukaryota
- Kingdom: Animalia
- Phylum: Arthropoda
- Class: Insecta
- Order: Blattodea
- Infraorder: Isoptera
- Family: Termitidae
- Subfamily: Syntermitinae
- Genus: Syntermes; Holmgren, 1909

= Syntermes =

Genus of termites

Syntermes is a genus of large Neotropical higher termites within the subfamily Syntermitinae. The genus is found only in South America where members are distributed widely throughout the continent, being found from the tropical rainforests of Colombia to the savannas of Brazil and Northern Argentina.

Most known species forage in the open and collect either leaf or grass litter which is stored in subterranean chambers for later consumption. The nests are primarily subterranean with epigeal mound structures built from loose dirt of varying compactness. Some species, such as Syntermes dirus, construct highly impressive mounds with the most well known being found in a large complex of mounds spanning an area the size of Great Britain in northeastern Brazil. The mounds in this complex average 2.5 meters tall and 9 meters wide and are estimated to be as old as 4,000 years. Large species such as Syntermes aculeosus are eaten in some indigenous cultures; for example in the Makiritare in the Alto Orinoco province of Venezuela, where they fish the soldiers out via a stick. A few species are known to cause some damage to cultivated plants like young Eucalyptus, peanuts, sugarcane and yams.

== Identification ==
Workers of this genus are highly polymorphic, with there being four distinguishable sterile worker castes. The two largest castes are male and have heavily sclerotized heads ranging from brown to yellowish. The two smallest are female and have white unsclerotized heads of different sizes. Spines on the thoracic nota are present, although not as conspicuous as in the soldiers.

The soldier caste is mostly monomorphic and likely develops from the largest male worker caste, which molts into a presoldier, and then into the terminal soldier molt. Soldiers have prominent spines on the thoracic nota, and unlike most other Syntermitinae soldiers, have a very short to completely absent frontal tube (nasus) on the head. Young colonies of some species have forma prima (first form) soldiers which are significantly smaller and morphologically distinct from soldiers of mature colonies. The soldiers of some Syntermes species are amongst the largest of all termites, with the soldiers of Syntermes spinosus obtaining an average dry bodyweight of 51.0±1.7 mg, comparable to the largest Macrotermes species of Africa.

The imagoes have 19-21 antenna articles (antennomeres), the same number as workers. The head is generally round, with the compound eyes and ocelli generally being proportionally smaller than the head capsule. The postclypeus is not heavily inflated such as in other Termitidae. The pronotum is mostly the same width as the head although sometimes a bit larger or narrower and mostly flat, and the fontanelle is often circular and large. The wings are long, somewhat narrow and often heavily sclerotized.

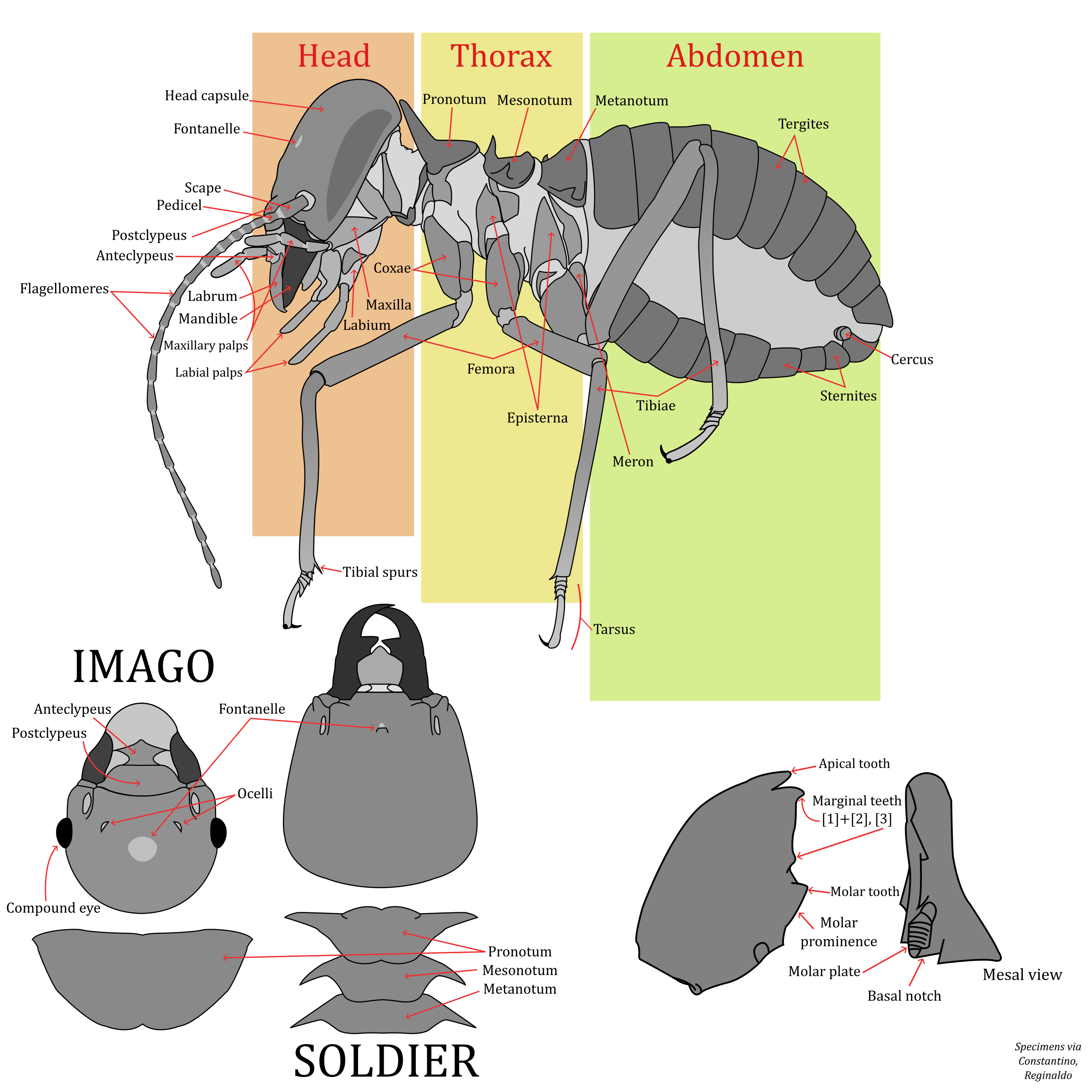
Syntermes aculeosus worker, imago, and soldier illustrated along with mandibles and corresponding anatomical terminology.

== Species ==
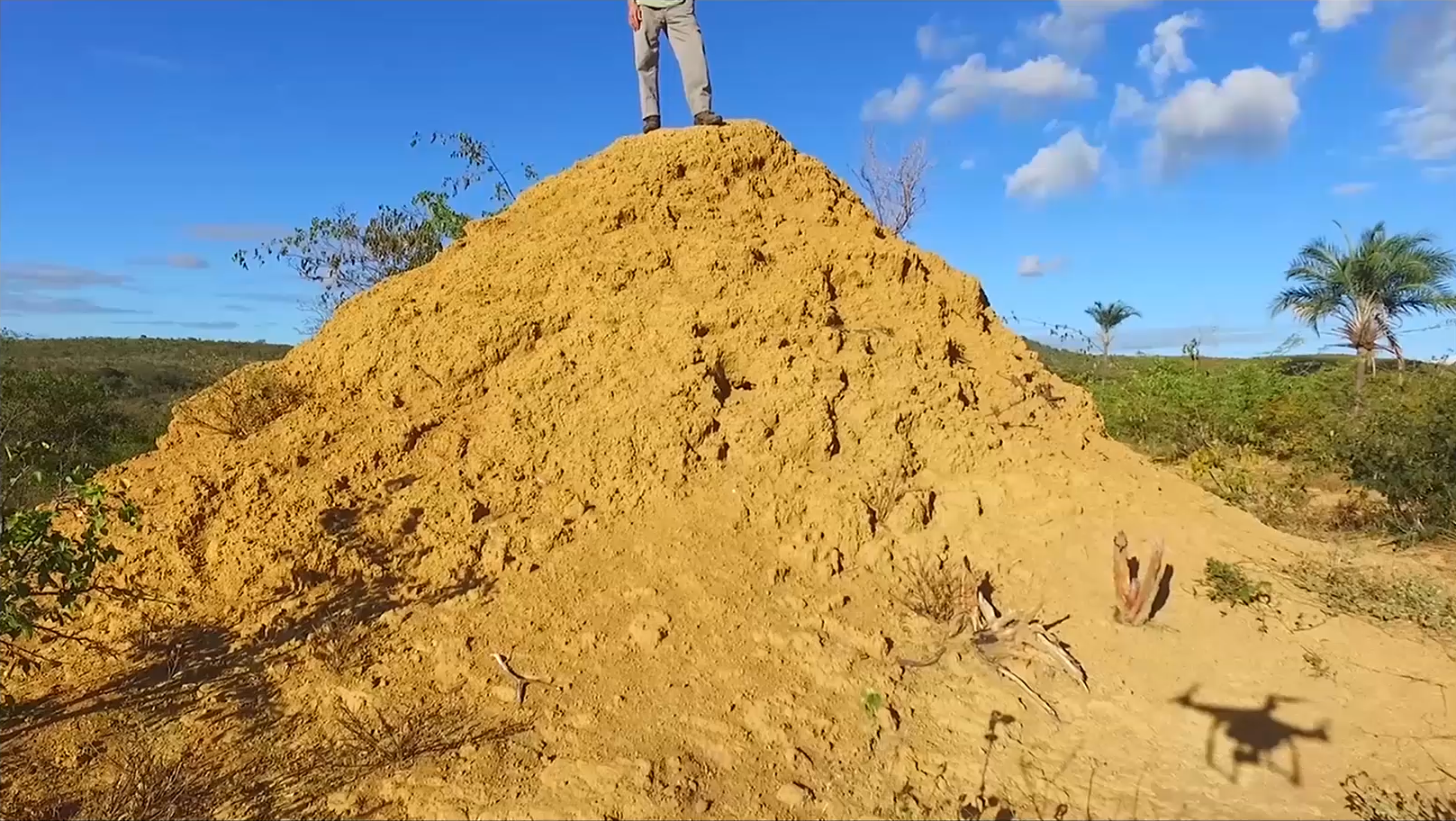
Syntermes dirus mound in Brazil

1. Syntermes aculeosus
2. Syntermes barbatus
3. Syntermes bolivianus
4. Syntermes brevimalatus
5. Syntermes calvus
6. Syntermes cearensis
7. Syntermes chaquimayensis
8. Syntermes crassilabrum
9. Syntermes dirus
10. Syntermes grandis
11. Syntermes insidians
12. Syntermes longiceps
13. Syntermes magnoculus
14. Syntermes molestus
15. Syntermes nanus
16. Syntermes obtusus
17. Syntermes parallelus
18. Syntermes peruanus
19. Syntermes praecellens
20. Syntermes spinosus
21. Syntermes tanygnathus
22. Syntermes territus
23. Syntermes wheeleri
