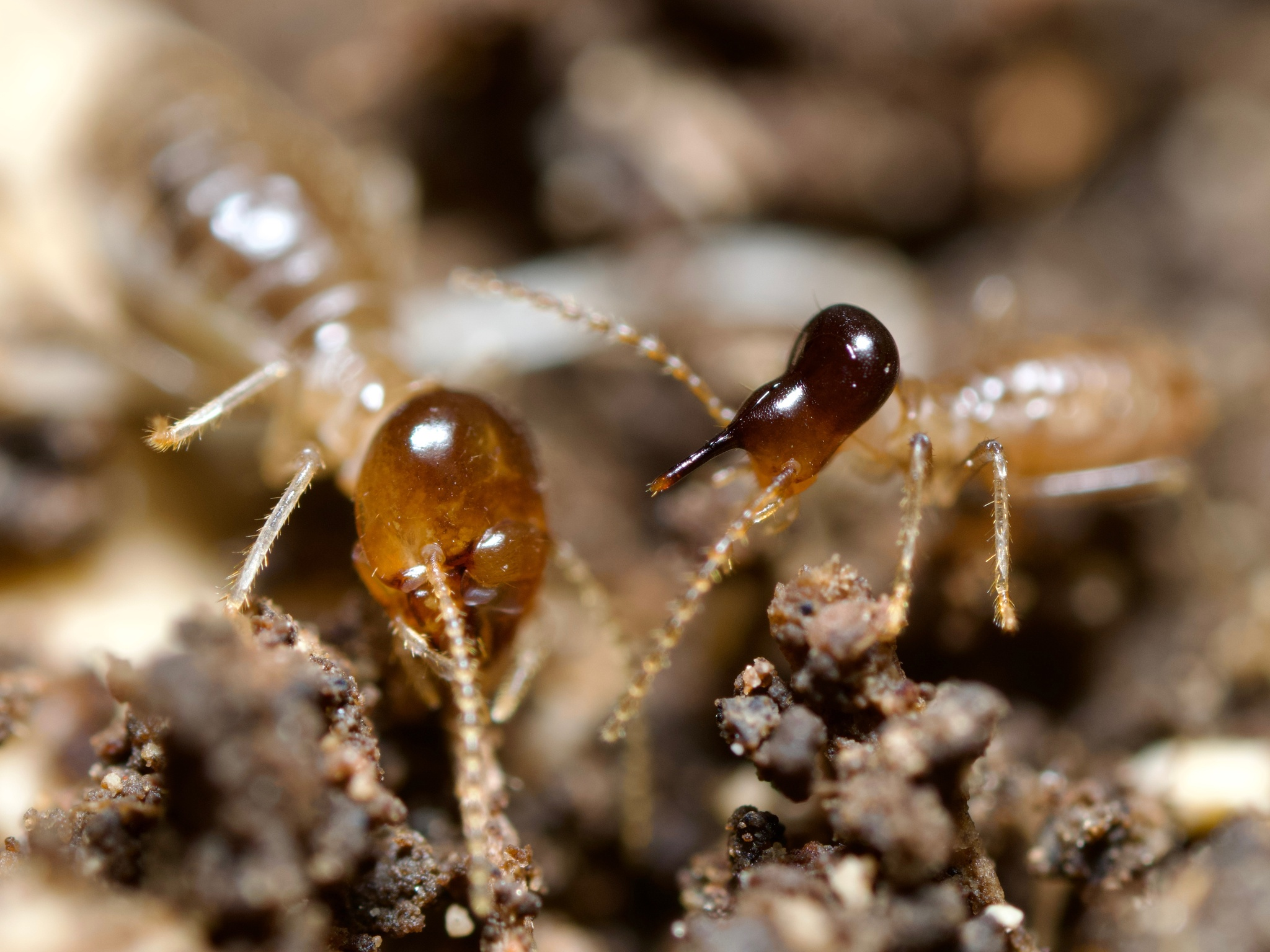

Scientific classification
- Kingdom: Animalia
- Phylum: Arthropoda
- Clade: Pancrustacea
- Class: Insecta
- Order: Blattodea
- Infraorder: Isoptera
- Family: Termitidae
- Genus: Tenuirostritermes
- Species: T. cinereus

Binomial name
- Tenuirostritermes cinereus (Buckley, 1862)

= Tenuirostritermes cinereus =

Species of termite

Tenuirostritermes cinereus is a species of termite in the family Termitidae. It is found in Central America and North America.
