= Tenuirostritermes =

Scientific classification
- Domain: Eukaryota
- Kingdom: Animalia
- Phylum: Arthropoda
- Class: Insecta
- Order: Blattodea
- Infraorder: Isoptera
- Family: Termitidae
- Subfamily: Nasutitermitinae
- Genus: Tenuirostritermes; Holmgren, 1912

Genus of termites

Tenuirostritermes is a genus of termites in the family Termitidae. There are about five described species in Tenuirostritermes.

== Species ==
These five species belong to the genus Tenuirostritermes:

- Tenuirostritermes briciae (Snyder, 1922)
- Tenuirostritermes cinereus (Buckley, 1862)
- Tenuirostritermes incisus (Snyder, 1922)
- Tenuirostritermes strenuus (Hagen, 1860)
- Tenuirostritermes tenuirostris (Desneux, 1904)
