= Ceylonitermes =

Scientific classification
- Kingdom: Animalia
- Phylum: Arthropoda
- Clade: Pancrustacea
- Class: Insecta
- Order: Blattodea
- Infraorder: Isoptera
- Family: Termitidae
- Subfamily: Nasutitermitinae
- Genus: Ceylonitermes; Holmgren, 1912

Type species
- Eutermes escherichi Holmgren, 1911

Genus of termites

Ceylonitermes is a genus of termites in the subfamily Nasutitermitinae. They are found in South and Southeast Asia.

== Species ==
There are two species:

- Ceylonitermes escherichi (Holmgren, 1911) – Sri Lanka
- Ceylonitermes indicola Thakur, 1976 – India (Kerala), Indonesia (Sumatra)
