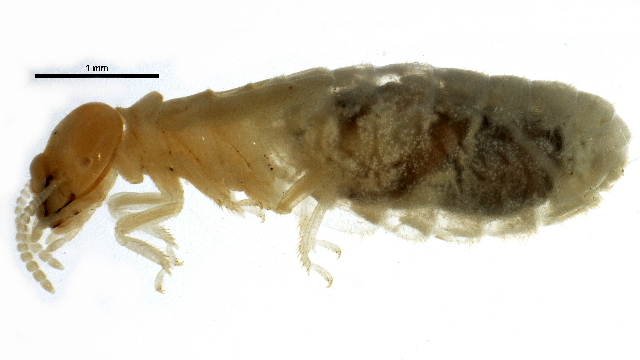
- Constrictotermes cavifrons

Scientific classification
- Domain: Eukaryota
- Kingdom: Animalia
- Phylum: Arthropoda
- Class: Insecta
- Order: Blattodea
- Infraorder: Isoptera
- Nanorder: Geoisoptera
- Family: Termitidae
- Subfamily: Nasutitermitinae
- Genus: Constrictotermes; Holmgren, 1910

= Constrictotermes =

Genus of termites

Constrictotermes is a genus of Neotropical higher termites within the subfamily Nasutitermitinae. They form large open-air foraging columns from which they travel to and from their sources of food, similar to the Indomalayan species of processionary termites. Species of this genus commonly build epigeal or arboreal nests and feed on a variety of lichens, rotted woods and mosses.

== Description ==
Soldiers are monomorphic and identifiable with a notable constriction of the head behind the antenna sockets; the antenna have 13-14 articles, and the points of the mandibles are small. Species of this genus are distributed throughout the Neotropics, occurring primarily within South America and Central America; with one species, C. guantanamensis, being found within the extreme southeastern coast of Cuba. Within South America, Constrictotermes spp. can be found from the tropical rainforests of the Amazon to the xeric shrublands of Northeastern Brazil.

As with all Nasutitermitinae termites, the soldiers are capable of shooting a noxious terpene based chemical repellant from their fontanellar gun that solidifies when exposed to air.

== Species ==
1. Constrictotermes cavifrons
2. Constrictotermes cyphergaster
3. Constrictotermes guantanamensis
4. Constrictotermes latinotus
5. Constrictotermes rupestris
6. Constrictotermes cacaoensis
