= Echinotermes =

Scientific classification
- Domain: Eukaryota
- Kingdom: Animalia
- Phylum: Arthropoda
- Class: Insecta
- Order: Blattodea
- Infraorder: Isoptera
- Family: Termitidae
- Subfamily: Apicotermitinae
- Genus: Echinotermes; Castro & Scheffrahn, 2018
- Species: E. biriba

Binomial name
- Echinotermes biriba Castro & Scheffrahn, 2018

Genus of termites

Echinotermes, is a genus of soldierless termites belonging to the family Termitidae, containing a single species, Echinotermes biriba, which is endemic to Colombia.

== Description ==
Worker is monomorphic. Light yellowish Head capsule and antennae present. Pronotum pale yellow. Legs are hyaline. Fore-tibia moderately inflated. Digestive tube composed with a very large crop. Mesenteron forms a complete 360° loop.
