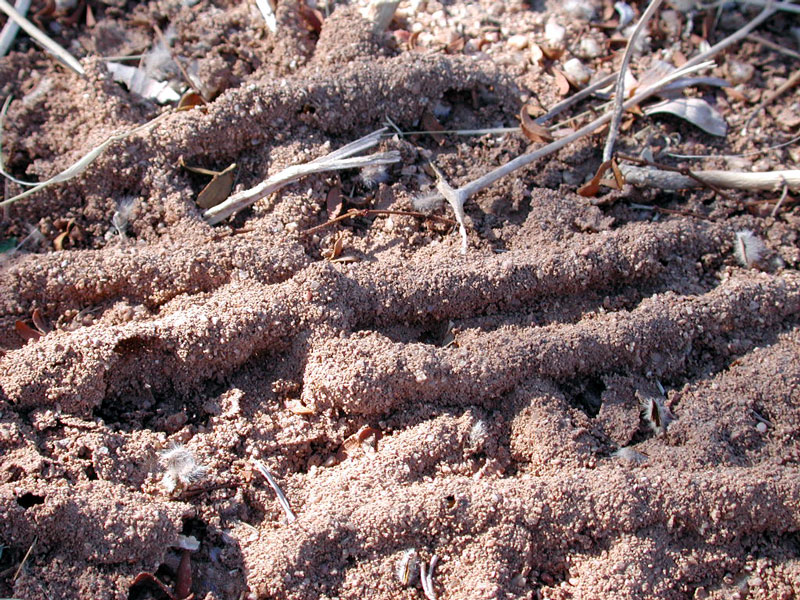
- Twigs encrusted by termite debris

Scientific classification
- Kingdom: Animalia
- Phylum: Arthropoda
- Clade: Pancrustacea
- Class: Insecta
- Order: Blattodea
- Infraorder: Isoptera
- Family: Termitidae
- Genus: Gnathamitermes
- Species: G. perplexus

Binomial name
- Gnathamitermes perplexus (Banks in Banks & Snyder, 1920)

= Gnathamitermes perplexus =

Species of termite

Gnathamitermes perplexus, the long-jawed desert termites or tube-building termites, is a species of termite in the family Termitidae. It is found in Central America and North America. The species creates tunnels, with both colony founders and workers transporting sand to excavate tunnels using their mandibles. The species is particularly susceptible to infectious nematodes such as Steinernema riobrave.
