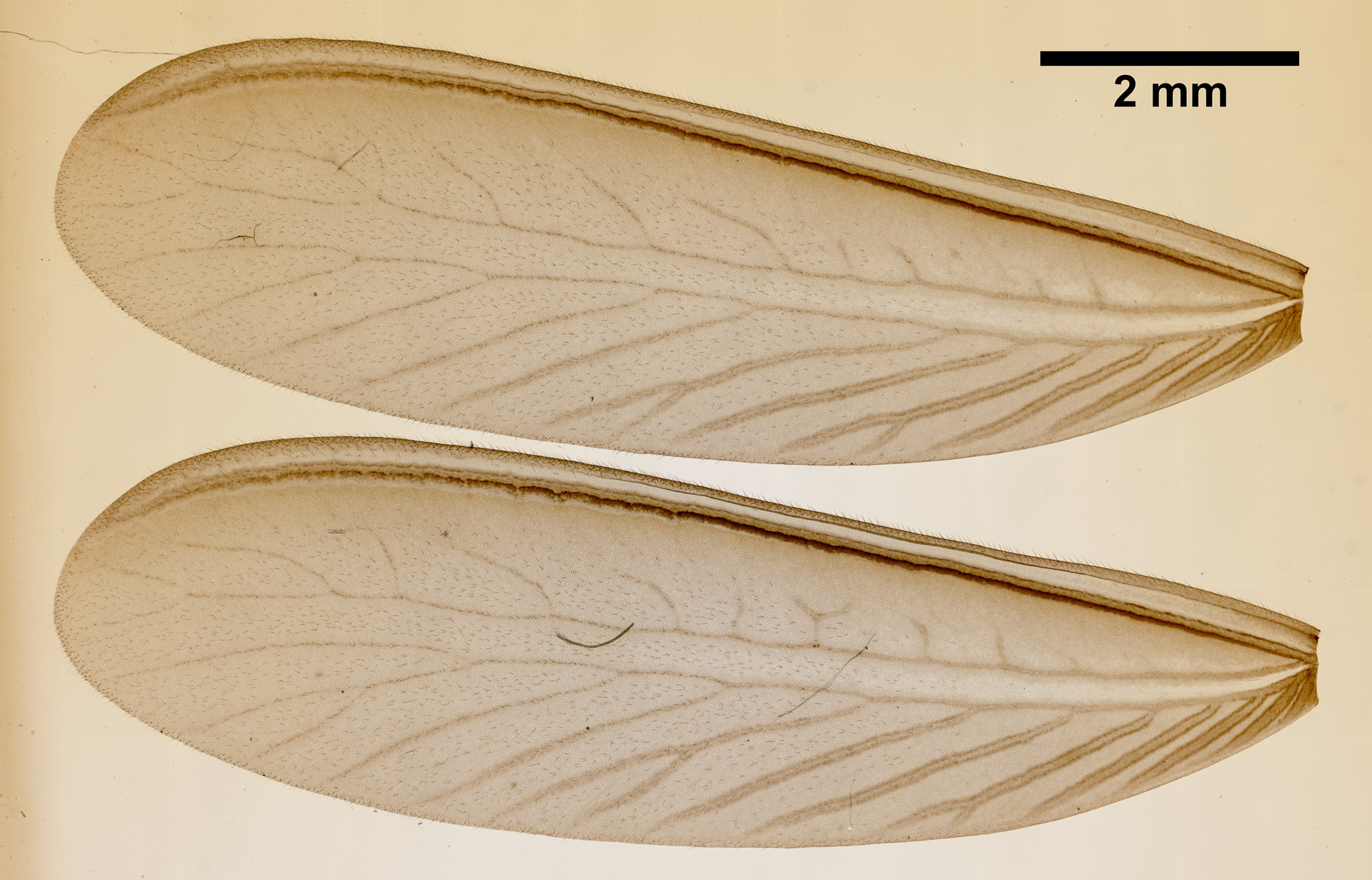
- Wing venation of unnamed Termes reproductive

Scientific classification
- Kingdom: Animalia
- Phylum: Arthropoda
- Clade: Pancrustacea
- Class: Insecta
- Order: Blattodea
- Infraorder: Isoptera
- Nanorder: Geoisoptera
- Family: Termitidae
- Subfamily: Termitinae
- Genus: Termes; Linnaeus 1758

Type species
- Termes fatalis Linnaeus, 1758

Synonyms
- Mirotermes Wasmann 1897

= Termes (insect) =

Genus of termites

Termes is a genus of higher termites in the subfamily Termitinae. The type genus of its family, it has a pantropical distribution and has included other species, now placed in other genera; there are also a number of extinct species.

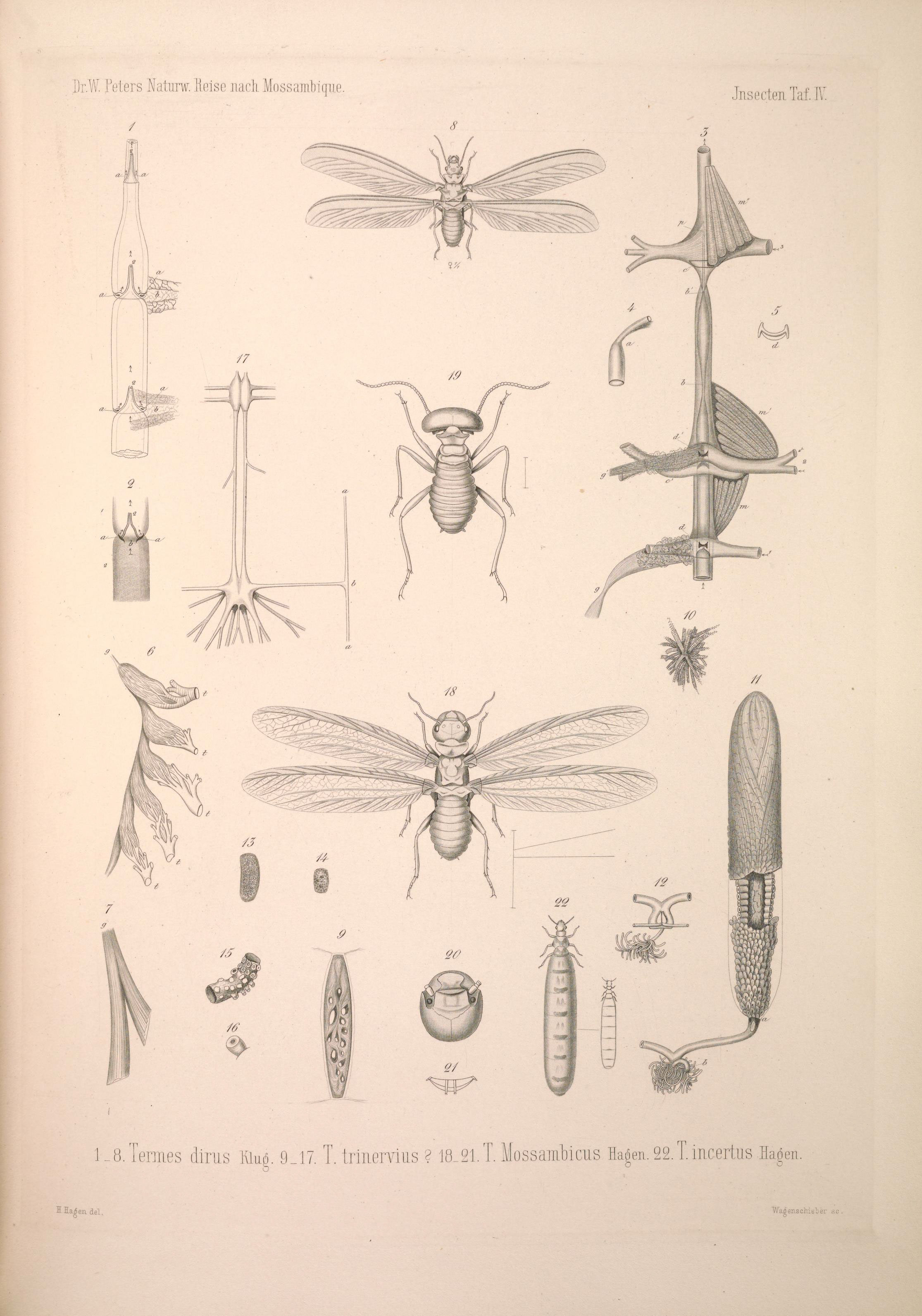
Illustration of Termes species.

== Species ==
The Termite Catalogue lists the following:

- Termes amaralii
- Termes amicus †
- Termes ayri
- Termes baculi
- Termes baculiformis
- Termes bolivianus
- Termes boultoni
- Termes brevicornis
- Termes buchii †
- Termes capensis
- Termes comis
- Termes croaticus †
- Termes drabatyi †
- Termes fatalis
- Termes hauffi †
- Termes hispaniolae
- Termes hospes
- Termes huayangensis
- Termes korschefskyi †
- Termes laticornis
- Termes major
- Termes marjoriae
- Termes medioculatus
- Termes melindae
- Termes nigritus
- Termes obscurus †
- Termes panamaensis
- Termes primitivus †
- Termes propinquus
- Termes riograndensis
- Termes rostratus
- Termes rutoti †
- Termes scheeri †
- Termes schleipi †
- Termes siruguei †
- Termes splendens
- Termes stitzi †
- Termes weismanni †
