= Inquilinitermes =

Scientific classification
- Domain: Eukaryota
- Kingdom: Animalia
- Phylum: Arthropoda
- Class: Insecta
- Order: Blattodea
- Infraorder: Isoptera
- Family: Termitidae
- Subfamily: Termitinae
- Genus: Inquilinitermes

Type species
- Inquilinitermes sp. Mathews, 1977

Species
- Inquilinitermes microcerus (Silvestri, 1901); Inquilinitermes fur (Silvestri, 1901); Inquilinitermes inquilinus (Emerson, 1925); Inquilinitermes johnchapmani Scheffrahn, 2014

Genus of termites

Inquilinitermes is a genus of Neotropical termites described by Anthony G. Mathews that includes species found exclusively inside nests of another termite species (i.g. host termites) in the genus Constrictotermes . For not being able to build their own nest, every species of Inquilinitermes has been commonly referred as an obligatory inquiline and its symbiosis with a host termite has been treated as inquilinism.

In the past few decades, species of the genus have been investigated in various studies, focusing on their relationship with the host species, their diet requirements and, more recently, behavioral aspects of their symbiosis with the builder termites

== See also ==
- Mutualism – both species experience a mutual benefit in the relationship.
- Parasitism – one species benefits at the expense of another in the relationship.
- Parabiosis – both species occupy the same dwelling without interdependence.
- Symbiosis – long-term stable relationships between different species.
