= Ceylonitermes escherichi =

Scientific classification
- Kingdom: Animalia
- Phylum: Arthropoda
- Class: Insecta
- Order: Blattodea
- Infraorder: Isoptera
- Family: Termitidae
- Genus: Ceylonitermes
- Species: C. escherichi

Binomial name
- Ceylonitermes escherichi (Holmgren, 1911)

Synonyms
- Eutermes escherichi Holmgren 1911

Species of termite

Ceylonitermes escherichi is a species of termite. It is endemic to Sri Lanka.
