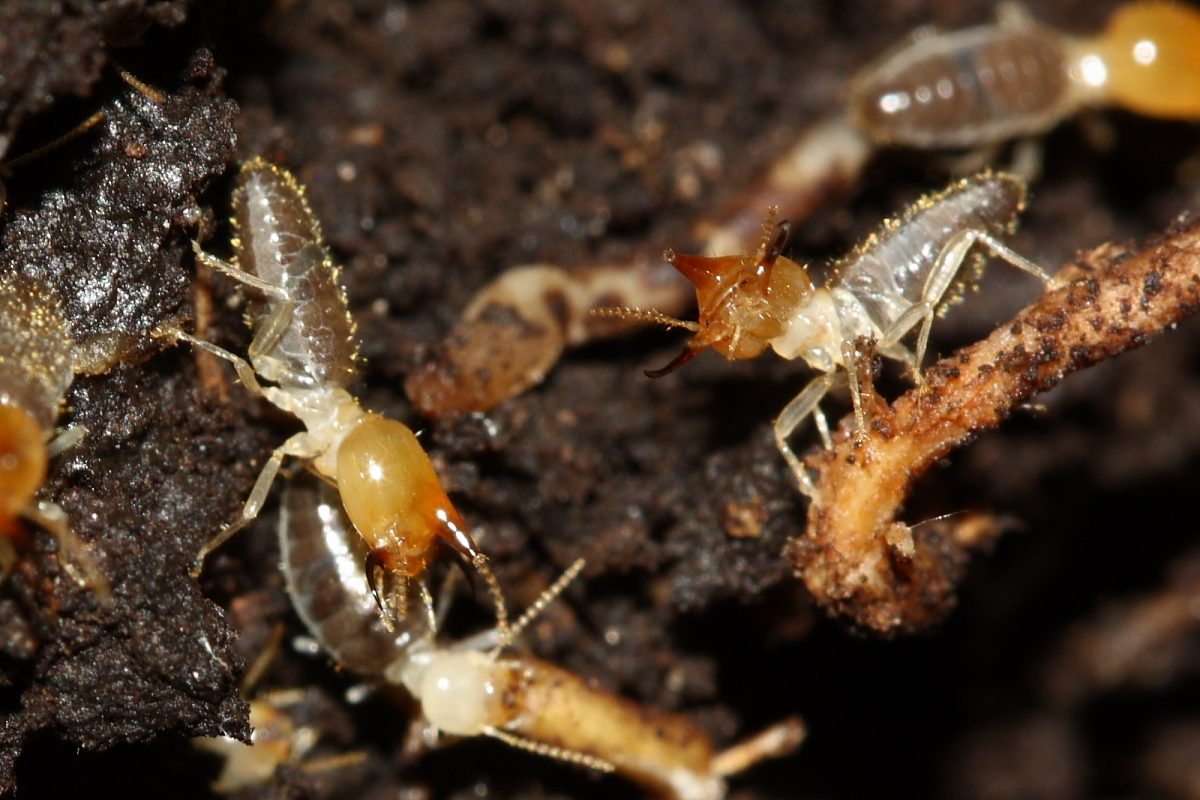
- Embiratermes neotenicus

Scientific classification
- Kingdom: Animalia
- Phylum: Arthropoda
- Clade: Pancrustacea
- Class: Insecta
- Order: Blattodea
- Infraorder: Isoptera
- Family: Termitidae
- Subfamily: Syntermitinae; Engel, Michael S.; Krishna, Kumar 2004

= Syntermitinae =

Subfamily of termites

The Syntermitinae, also known as the Mandibulate nasutes, is a Neotropical subfamily of higher termites represented by 21 genera and 103 species. The soldier caste of members of this subfamily have a conspicuous horn-like projection on the head which is adapted for chemical defense, similar to the fontanellar gun of true nasute termites (Nasutitermitinae). However unlike true nasutes, the mandibles of the soldiers are functional and highly developed, and they are unable to expel their chemical weaponry at a distance – instead relying on direct physical contact. Some genera, such as Syntermes or Labiotermes, have a highly reduced nasus and in some species it may appear absent altogether. Although the Syntermitinae were once grouped and considered basal within the Nasutitermitinae, they are not closely related with modern cladistic analyses showing Syntermitinae to be a separate lineage that is sister to Microcerotermitinae. It is believed the nasus evolved independently in Syntermitinae in an example of convergent evolution. Genera range from southern Mexico (Cahuallitermes) to Northern Argentina (Cornitermes, Procornitermes, Rhynchotermes, Syntermes) with the highest diversity occurring in the Brazilian Cerrado.

== Identification ==
The frontal-gland or fontanelle of soldiers is at the tip of a large projection (nasus) located in the frontal region of the head, and the soldier mandibles have a recognizable molar plate and prominence. The first proctodeal segment (P1) of the gut in workers are similar across all genera, distinguished by a generally inflated and globose shape with diverse ornamentation arrangements specialized to certain feeding strategies.

== Genera ==
- Acangaobitermes
- Armitermes
- Bandeiratermes
- Biratermes
- Cahuallitermes
- Cornitermes
- Curvitermes
- Cyrilliotermes
- Embiratermes
- Genuotermes
- Ibitermes
- Labiotermes
- Macuxitermes
- Mapinguaritermes
- Noirotitermes
- Paracurvitermes
- Procornitermes
- Rhynchotermes
- Silvestritermes
- Syntermes
- Uncitermes
- Vaninitermes
