= Mound-building termites =

Group of termite species

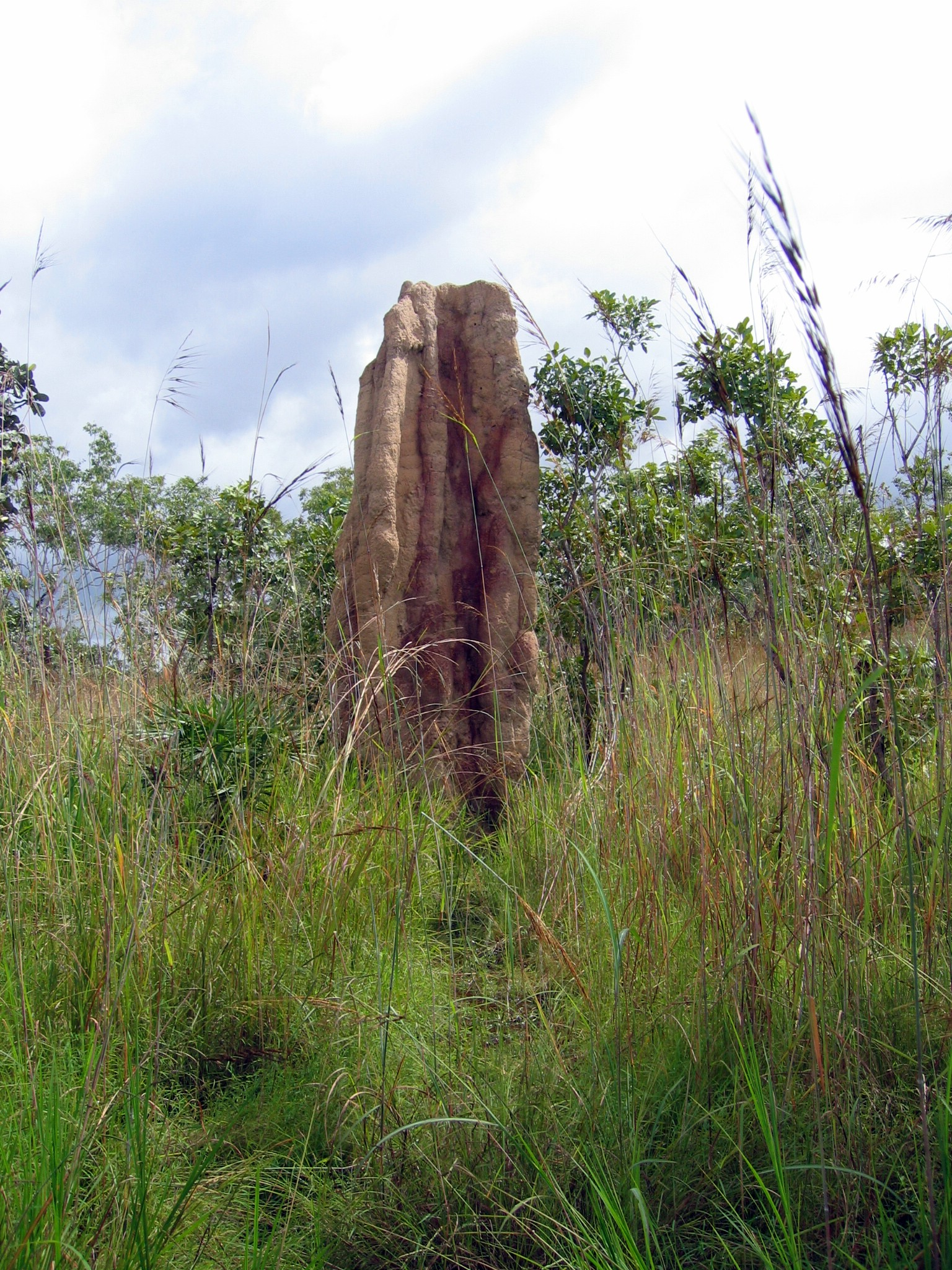
A mound or 'ant hill' (informal) in Australia

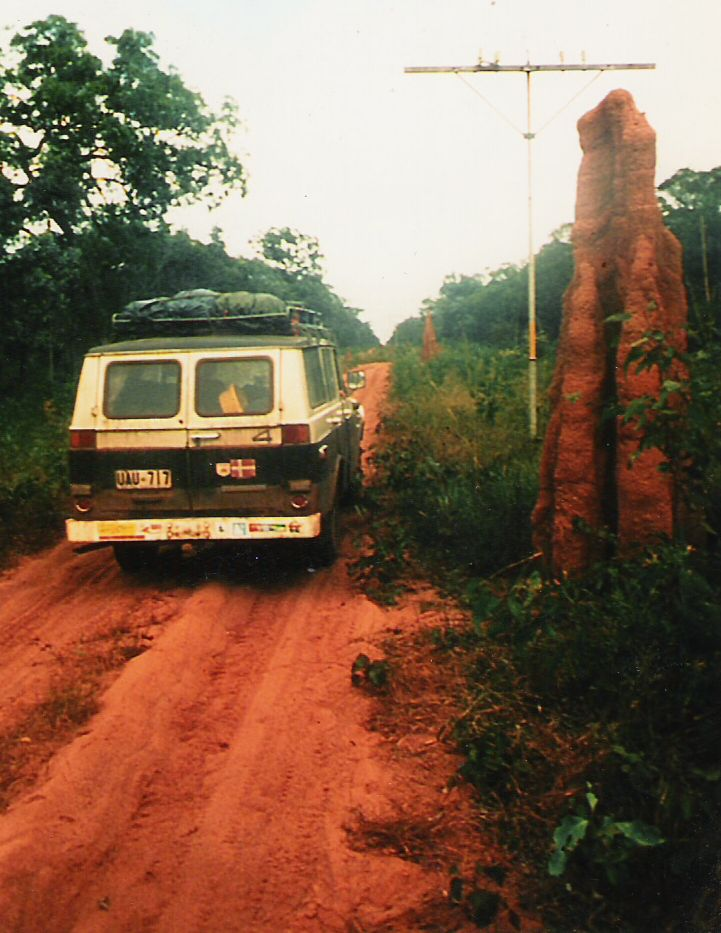
Mounds formed from the old wooden poles of the Cape York telegraph line.

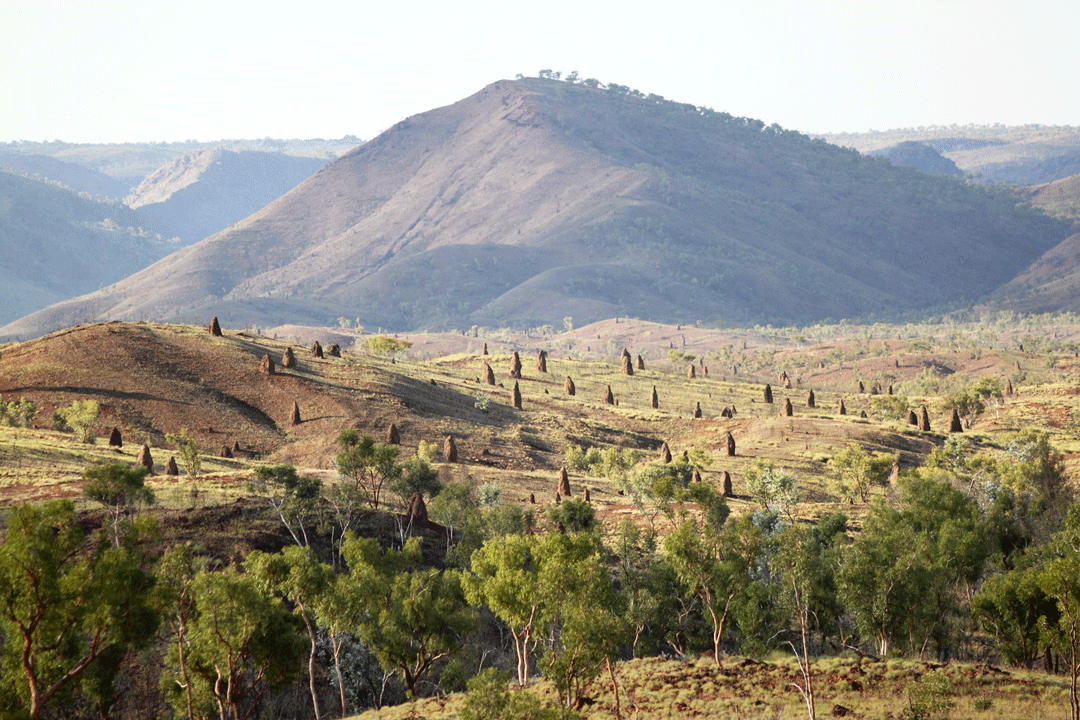
Mounds in the Bungle Bungle Range in Western Australia

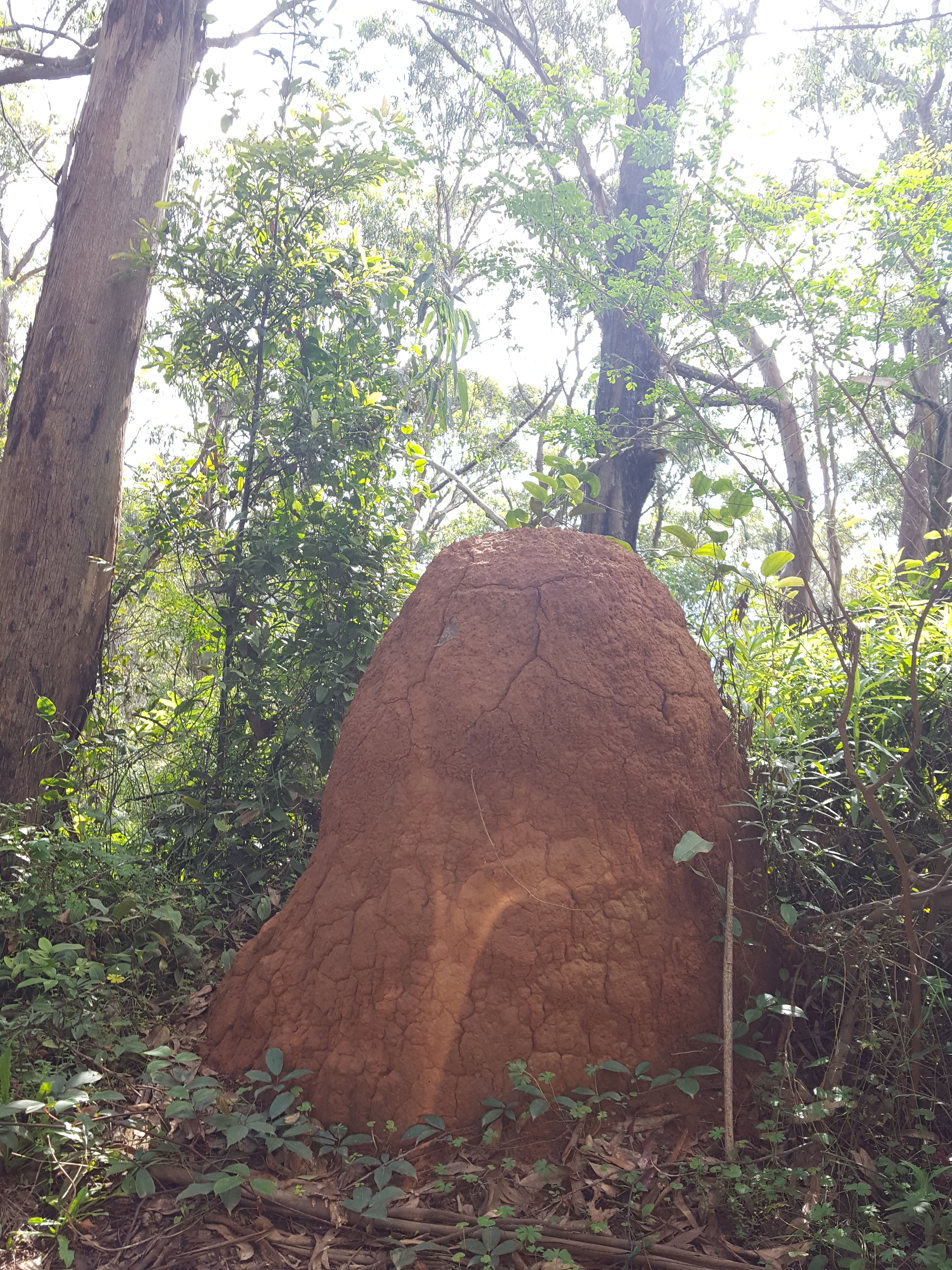
A mound in Mount Irvine, New South Wales, Australia.

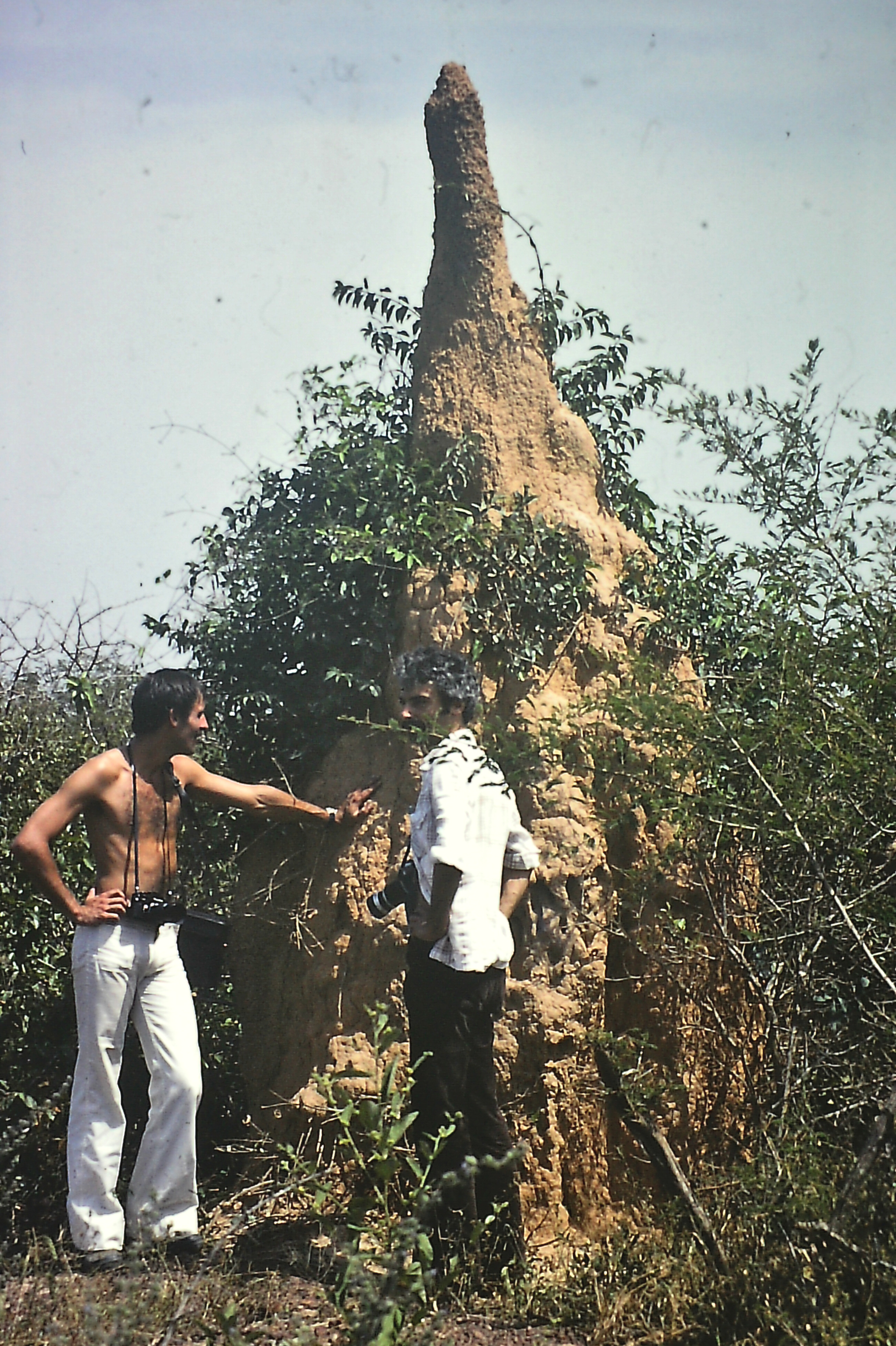
A mound in Senegal

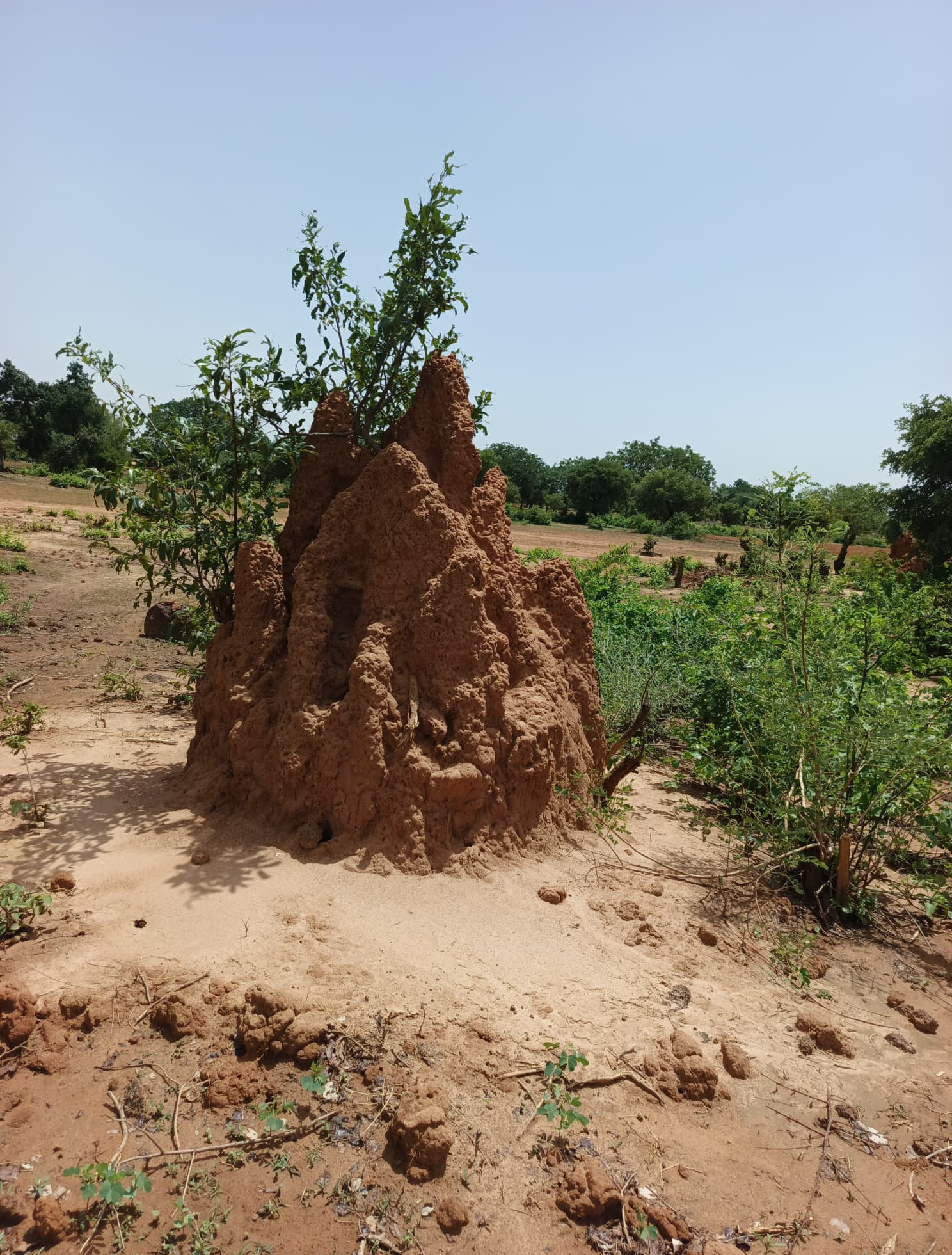
A mound in Nigeria

Mound-building termites are a group of termite species that live in mounds, also informally but unscientifically called 'ant hills', which are made of a combination of soil, termite saliva and dung. These termites live in Africa, Australia and South America. The mounds sometimes have a diameter of 30 metres (98 ft). Most of the mounds are in well-drained areas. Termite mounds usually outlive the colonies themselves. If the inner tunnels of the nest are exposed it is usually dead. Sometimes other colonies, of the same or different species, occupy a mound after the original builders' deaths.

== Mound structure ==
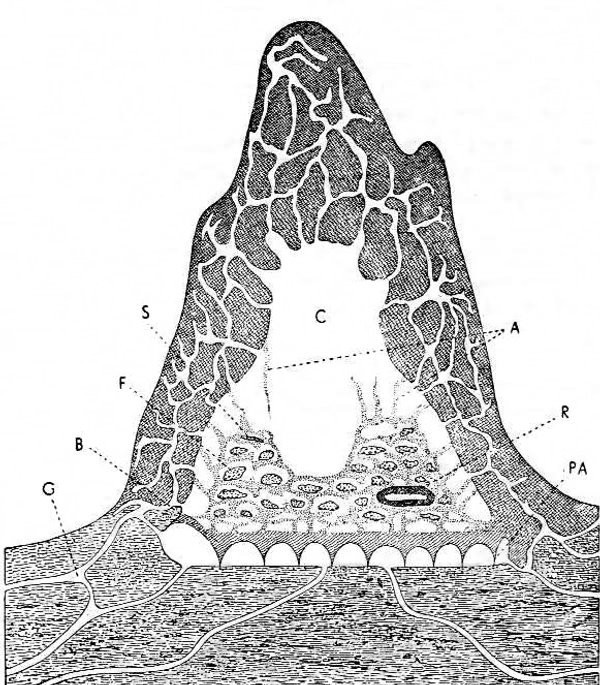
Structure of an M. natalensis mound

The structure of the mounds can be very complicated. Inside the mound is an extensive system of tunnels and conduits that serves as a ventilation system for the underground nest. In order to get good ventilation, the termites will construct several shafts leading down to the cellar located beneath the nest. The mound is built above the subterranean nest. The nest itself is a spheroidal structure consisting of numerous gallery chambers. They come in a wide variety of shapes and sizes. Some, like Odontotermes termites build open chimneys or vent holes into their mounds, while others build completely enclosed mounds like Macrotermes. The Amitermes (Magnetic termites) mounds are created tall, thin, wedge-shaped, usually oriented north-south.

== Ventilation in mounds ==
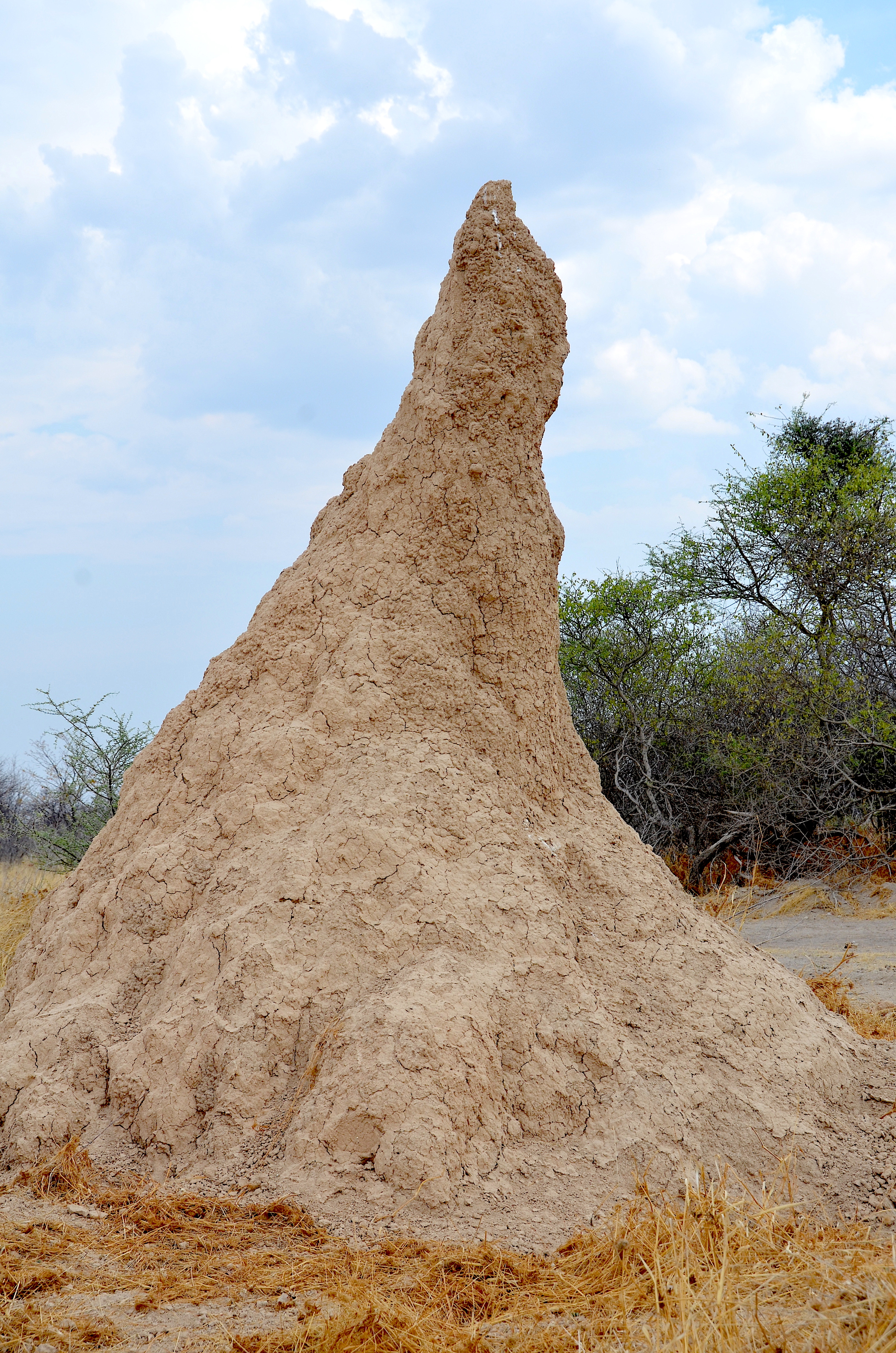
Termite mound in Namibia (2014)

The extensive system of tunnels and conduits have long been considered to help control climate inside the mound. The termite mound is able to regulate temperature, humidity and respiratory gas distribution. An early proposition suggested a thermosiphon mechanism. The heat created due to the metabolism of termites imparts sufficient buoyancy to the nest air to push it up into the mound and eventually to the mound’s porous surface where heat and gases exchange with the atmosphere through the porous walls. The density of air near the surface rises due to heat exchange and is forced below the nest and eventually through the nest again. This model was proposed for mounds with capped chimneys and with no large vents constructed by the species Macrotermes natalensis. A similar model based on the Stack effect was proposed for mounds with open-chimneys. The tall chimneys are exposed to higher wind velocities compared to openings at ground level due to surface boundary condition. Therefore, a Venturi flow draws fresh air into the mound through the openings at ground level which flows through the nest and finally out of the mound through the chimney. The flow is unidirectional in the stack effect model compared to the circulatory flow in the thermosiphon model.

Odontotermes transvaalensis mound temperature is not regulated by ventilation within the mound. The tall chimneys rather induce flow due to the Venturi effect and are the primary facilitators of ventilation. Research conducted on Macrotermes michaelseni mounds has shown that the primary role played by the mound is that of exchanging respiratory gases. The complex interaction between the mound and kinetic energy of turbulent winds are the driving forces for the colony’s gas exchange. But recent studies on the Macrotermes michaelseni mound with a better built custom sensor to measure airflow suggests that the air in the mound largely moves due to the convective flows induced by the diurnal oscillation of the external temperature. A secondary thermal gradient is generated due to partial exposure of east side of the mound to the sun before and west side of the mound after noon. Improved reliability of the sensor suggests that wind plays a secondary role relative to the dominant thermal mechanism in ventilation. Wind enhances the exchange of gases near the walls but does not induce significant average or transient flows within the mound. Overall, a similar mechanism of ventilation and thermoregulation is observed in Macrotermes michaelseni and Odontotermes obesus mounds.

== Social castes ==
Workers, smallest in size, are the most numerous of the castes. They are all completely blind, wingless, and sexually immature. Their job is to feed and groom all of the dependent castes. They also dig tunnels, locate food and water, maintain colony atmospheric homeostasis, and build and repair the nest.

The soldiers' job is to defend the colony from any unwanted animals. When the large soldiers attack, they emit a drop of brown, corrosive salivary liquid, which spreads between the open mandibles. When they bite, the liquid spreads over the opponent. The secretion is commonly stated to be toxic or undergoes coagulation with the air which renders it glue-like.

Finally, there are the reproductives, which include the king and the queen, responsible for reproducing.

The queen can sometimes grow up to six centimeters long, while the lower classes are generally less than one centimeter.

== Other life on termite mounds ==
Vegetation on termite mounds usually differs highly from vegetation in the surrounding. In African savannas, Macrotermes mounds form 'islands' with high tree densities. This is usually attributed to the fact that the mound soils are generally more fertile than other soil due to the digging of termites and their decomposition of plant material. On top of that, mound soils have been found to contain more water than their surroundings, a clear advantage for plant growth in savannas. The high tree densities on termite mounds attract high densities of browsing herbivores, due to the high nutrient contents in foliage from trees growing on mounds, or perhaps due to the high quantities of food and shelter on mounds.

== Brazilian caatinga mounds ==
The caatinga ecoregion in northeast Brazil has about 200 million termite mounds spread over an area the size of Great Britain. Some of the mounds are 3 m (10 ft) tall and 10 m (33 ft) wide, and they are spaced about 20 m (66 ft) apart. Underneath the mounds are networks of tunnels that required the excavation of 10 cubic kilometres (2.4 cu mi) of dirt.

Scientists performed radioactive dating on 11 of these mounds. The youngest mound was 690 years old, while the oldest was at least 3,820 years and possibly more than twice that. The mounds were built by Syntermes dirus termites, which are about half an inch long. Deforestation in the region helped to reveal the extent of the mounds to scientists. One scientist stated that the mounds apparently represent "the world's most extensive bio-engineering effort by a single insect species".

== Namaqualand mounds ==
Mounds built by Microhodotermes viator cover more than 20% of the area of Namaqualand, South Africa. Reaching heights of 2 m (6 ft 7 in) and diameters of up to 40 m (131 ft), some are 34,000 years old, making them the oldest inhabited termite structures in the world.

== See also ==
- Amitermes meridionalis, magnetic termite mounds of northern Australia
- Eusociality
