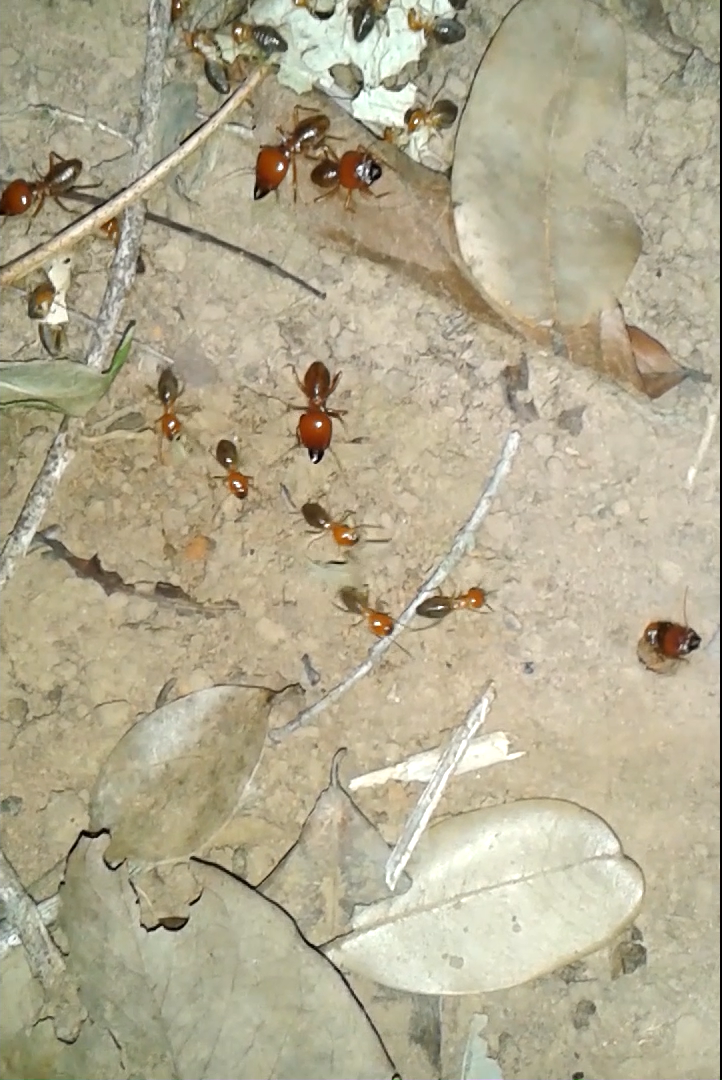

Scientific classification
- Kingdom: Animalia
- Phylum: Arthropoda
- Class: Insecta
- Order: Blattodea
- Infraorder: Isoptera
- Family: Termitidae
- Genus: Syntermes
- Species: S. dirus

Binomial name
- Syntermes dirus (Burmeister, 1839)

= Syntermes dirus =

Species of termite

Syntermes dirus is a species of termite native to Brazil which forage in the open for dead leaves, twigs etcetera. They build mounds up to 2.4 m (7 ft 10 in) high which may require 4,000 years to complete. One complex of mounds, termed a "megacity" covers 230,000 km^{2} (89,000 sq mi), larger than the island of Great Britain, and is said to be visible from space. Their activities have thus far involved the moving of 10 km^{3} (2.4 cu mi) of soil, enough to make four thousand stacks each the size of the Pyramid of Cheops. Of the nine most common species of termite in the Distrito Federal (Brasilia), Syntermes dirus is by far the largest, with soldiers averaging 117.3 micrograms (six times the weight of the second largest) and a length of 15.57 mm. This species forages at night for grass, leaves, both green and recently fallen. These are eaten as is, there apparently being no fungus gardens. In Brasilia the nests extend 1.5 m (5 ft) beneath the mound.
