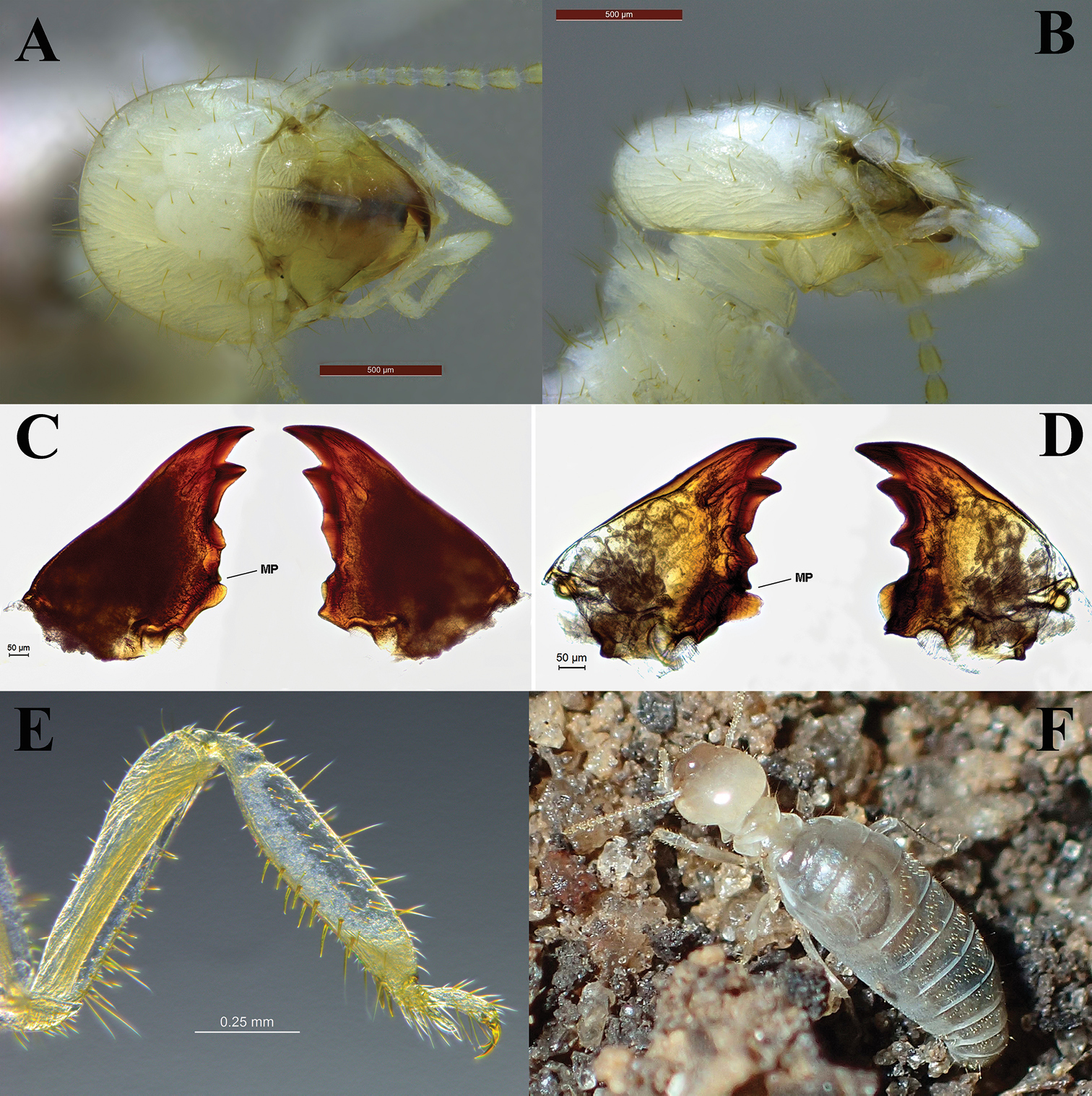
- Rustitermes boteroi

Scientific classification
- Kingdom: Animalia
- Phylum: Arthropoda
- Class: Insecta
- Order: Blattodea
- Infraorder: Isoptera
- Family: Termitidae
- Subfamily: Apicotermitinae; Grassé & Noirot, 1955

Type genus
- Apicotermes Holmgren, 1912

Genera
- See below

= Apicotermitinae =

Subfamily of termites

Apicotermitinae is a highly diverse group of predominantly soil-feeding termites within the family Termitidae. They are represented by 64 genera and 236 species distributed within the Neotropical, Afrotropical and Indomalayan realms. Most species of this subfamily have lost the soldier caste, which occurred independently at least twice within two separate lineages, the most notable of which being the Neotropical Anoplotermes-group. The majority of species live within diffuse subterranean nests, although some, such as Ruptitermes arboreus, build arboreal nests and feed on a wider variety of substrates such as leaf litter. Due to the lack of soldiers, Apicotermitinae workers are more aggressive and have evolved additional defenses such as autothysis. For example, the dehiscent organ located within the abdomen of Ruptitermes workers, which they intentionally rupture to release toxic substances onto their main predators, ants.

== Genera ==
It contains the following genera:

- Acholotermes
- Acidnotermes
- Acutidentitermes
- Adaiphrotermes
- Aderitotermes
- Adynatotermes
- Aganotermes
- Allognathotermes
- Alyscotermes
- Amalotermes
- Amicotermes
- Amplucrutermes
- Anaorotermes
- Anenteotermes
- Anoplotermes
- Apagotermes
- Aparatermes
- Apicotermes
- Apolemotermes
- Asagarotermes
- Astalotermes
- Astratotermes
- Ateuchotermes
- Aputitermes
- Hasitermes
- Compositermes
- Coxotermes
- Disjunctitermes
- Dissimulitermes
- Duplidentitermes
- Ebogotermes
- Eburnitermes
- Echinotermes
- Euhamitermes
- Eurytermes
- Firmitermes
- Gastrotermes
- Grigiotermes
- Heimitermes
- Hirsutitermes
- Hoplognathotermes
- Humutermes
- Hydrecotermes
- Indotermes
- Jugositermes
- Koutabatermes
- Krecekitermes
- Labidotermes
- Longustitermes
- Machadotermes
- Mangolditermes
- Ourissotermes
- Patawatermes
- Phoxotermes
- Rostrotermes
- Rubeotermes
- Ruptitermes
- Rustitermes
- Skatitermes
- Speculitermes
- Tetimatermes
- Tonsuritermes
- Trichotermes
- Tucupitermes
