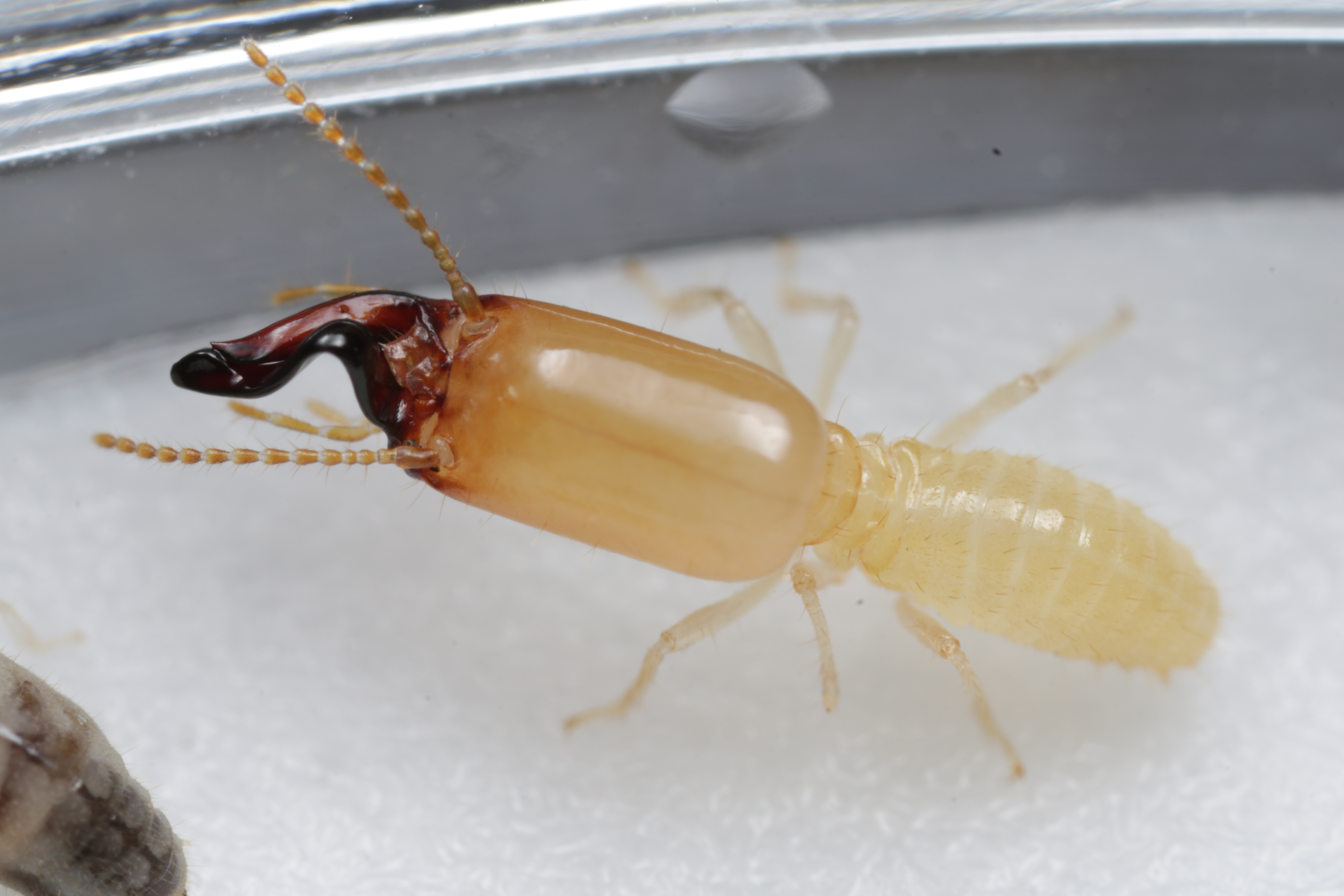
- Pericapritermes nitobei

Scientific classification
- Kingdom: Animalia
- Phylum: Arthropoda
- Clade: Pancrustacea
- Class: Insecta
- Order: Blattodea
- Infraorder: Isoptera
- Family: Termitidae
- Subfamily: Mirocapritermitinae; Kemner, 1934

Type genus
- Mirocapritermes Holmgren, 1914

= Mirocapritermitinae =

Subfamily of termites

Mirocapritermitinae is a subfamily of termites in the family Termitidae with 14 recognized genera. Members of this subfamily were previously assigned to the Pericapritermes-group Termitidae, which was formally regrouped into the revived subfamily per Hellemans et al., 2024. Species are distributed widely throughout the tropical Old World, and are predominantly soil-feeders or soil-wood interface feeders. The soldiers have highly adapted snapping mandibles, most of which are asymmetric and twisted, allowing them to snap extremely quickly against their main predators, ants. Pericapritermes nitobei has been recorded to snap at velocities between 89.7 and 132.4 meters per second within 8.68 microseconds, setting the record as the current fastest biological movement known.

== Genera ==
- Dicuspiditermes
- Homallotermes
- Indocapritermes
- Kemneritermes
- Krishnacapritermes
- Labiocapritermes
- Mirocapritermes
- Oriencapritermes
- Pericapritermes
- Procapritermes
- Pseudocapritermes
- Rinacapritermes
- Sinocapritermes
- Syncapritermes
