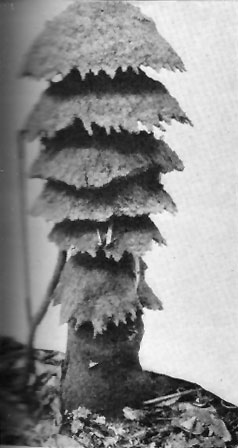
- Mushroom-shaped nest of Cubitermes sp.

Scientific classification
- Domain: Eukaryota
- Kingdom: Animalia
- Phylum: Arthropoda
- Class: Insecta
- Order: Blattodea
- Infraorder: Isoptera
- Family: Termitidae
- Subfamily: Cubitermitinae; Weidner, 1956: 99

= Cubitermitinae =

Subfamily of termites

The Cubitermitinae are an Afrotropical subfamily of higher termites with 28 known genera and 147 species. The nests of most species are either subterranean or found within the mounds of other termite species. The most well known genus of this subfamily is Cubitermes, which commonly build epigeal nests with one or more caps used to shield the nest against rainfall, giving them a characteristic mushroom shape. Most members of this subfamily feed on soil humus. Due to their feeding habits, many species have a high pH within their digestive system, with Noditermes indoensis in particular exhibiting a pH around 12.28 within their anterior proctodeum; amongst the most alkaline environments known in a biological system.

== Identification ==
The gut of workers have a specialized blind caecum/diverticulum connected to proctodeal 3 and a complex physiology that regulates the pH and oxygen supply in the gut compartments.

Soldiers have a generally subrectangular head capsule with a projection anterior to the frontal gland with the fontanelle being conspicuous and sunken in a pit or groove. The labrum is strongly bifurcated and the antennae have 14 - 15 articles (antennomeres).

== Genera ==
The following genera are currently recognized:

- Apilitermes
- Basidentitermes
- Batillitermes
- Crenetermes
- Cubitermes
- Euchilotermes
- Fastigitermes
- Furculitermes
- Isognathotermes
- Lepidotermes
- Megagnathotermes
- Mucrotermes
- Nitiditermes
- Noditermes
- Okavangotermes
- Ophiotermes
- Orthotermes
- Ovambotermes
- Pilotermes
- Polyspathotermes
- Proboscitermes
- Procubitermes
- Profastigitermes
- Ternicubitermes
- Thoracotermes
- Trapellitermes
- Unguitermes
- Unicornitermes
