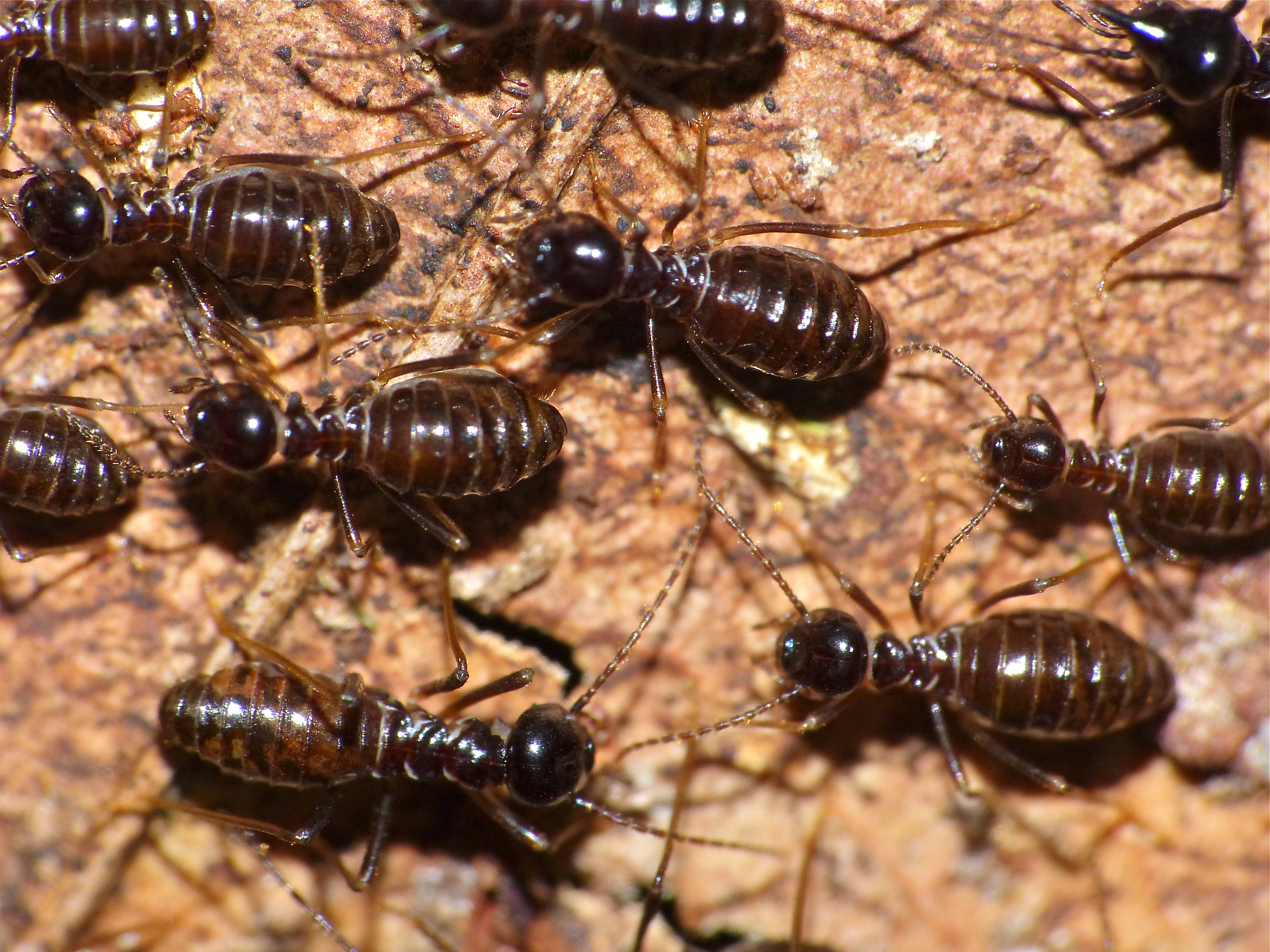
- Hospitalitermes sp.

Scientific classification
- Kingdom: Animalia
- Phylum: Arthropoda
- Clade: Pancrustacea
- Class: Insecta
- Order: Blattodea
- Infraorder: Isoptera
- Nanorder: Geoisoptera
- Family: Termitidae
- Subfamily: Nasutitermitinae
- Genus: Hospitalitermes; Holmgren, 1912

= Hospitalitermes =

Genus of termites

Hospitalitermes is an Asian–Papuan genus of lichen-eating termite in the subfamily Nasutitermitinae. There are 37 species currently listed, of which most are recognized for their extensive surface foraging columns. Due to their conspicuous foraging activities, they are commonly known as processionary or marching termites. They often inhabit cavities inside of living trees excavated by other species of termite.

== Description ==
The length of the workers and soldiers is about 5 mm. As with other genera in the subfamily, soldiers have a nasal tube from which, in case of danger, they shoot terpene-based repellents. They are one of the few species and genera of termites (Hospitalitermes, along with Lacessititermes and Longipeditermes) that forage in large columns in the open air. In the species Hospitalitermes hospitalis, the width of the columns is 20–30 mm (up to 8 termites in a row), they move away from the nest by an average of 29 m (up to 65 m), visiting neighboring trees and collecting lichens, mosses, fungi and other microepiphytes. One foraging expedition can involve up to 0.5 million individuals of one termite mound. It is also one of the few termites (together with Grallatotermes and Constrictotermes) that use living vascular plants (most termites feed on dead plants).

== Species ==
The Termite Catalogue lists the following:

- Hospitalitermes asahinai
- Hospitalitermes ataramensis (India, Indo-China)
- Hospitalitermes bicolor
- Hospitalitermes birmanicus
- Hospitalitermes blairi
- Hospitalitermes brevirostratus
- Hospitalitermes butteli
- Hospitalitermes damenglongensis
- Hospitalitermes diurnus
- Hospitalitermes ferrugineus
- Hospitalitermes flaviventris
- Hospitalitermes flavoantennaris
- Hospitalitermes grassii
- Hospitalitermes hospitalis (2 subspp.)
- Hospitalitermes irianensis
- Hospitalitermes javanicus
- Hospitalitermes jepsoni
- Hospitalitermes jinghongensis
- Hospitalitermes kali
- Hospitalitermes krishnai
- Hospitalitermes lividiceps
- Hospitalitermes luzonensis
- Hospitalitermes madrasi
- Hospitalitermes majusculus
- Hospitalitermes medioflavus
- Hospitalitermes moluccanus
- Hospitalitermes monoceros (Sri Lanka, India)
- Hospitalitermes nemorosus
- Hospitalitermes nicobarensis
- Hospitalitermes papuanus
- Hospitalitermes paraschmidti
- Hospitalitermes proflaviventris
- Hospitalitermes rufus
- Hospitalitermes schmidti
- Hospitalitermes seikii
- Hospitalitermes sharpi
- Hospitalitermes umbrinus
