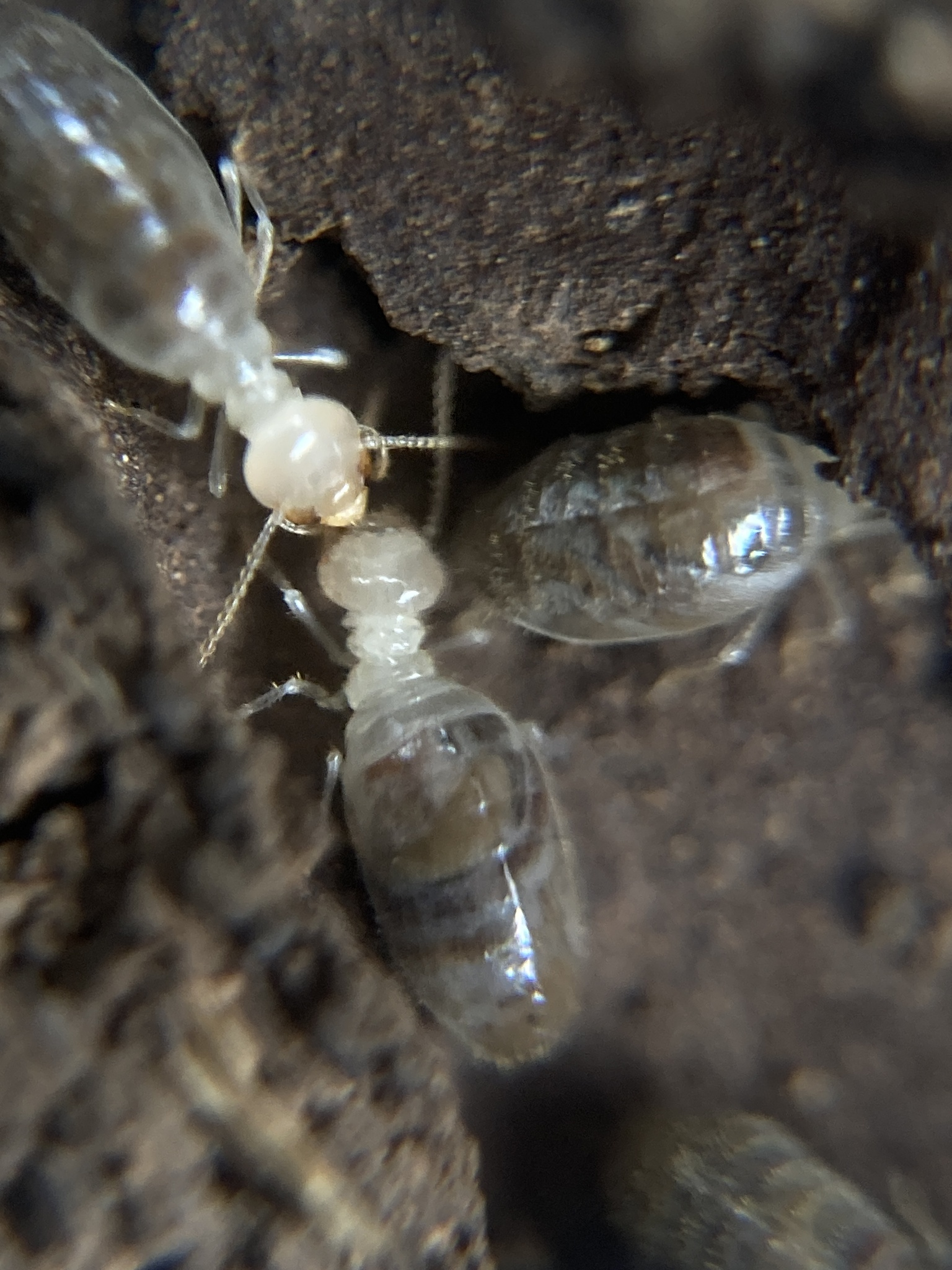
- Protocapritermes krisiformis workers with digestive system visible.

Scientific classification
- Kingdom: Animalia
- Phylum: Arthropoda
- Clade: Pancrustacea
- Class: Insecta
- Order: Blattodea
- Infraorder: Isoptera
- Family: Termitidae
- Subfamily: Termitinae; Latreille, 1802

Genera
- See text

Synonyms
- Capritermitini Weidner, 1956; Microcerotermitinae Holmgren, 1910; Mirocapritermitinae Kemner, 1934; Mirotermitini Weidner, 1956

= Termitinae =

Subfamily of termites

Termitinae is a diverse subfamily of higher termites represented by 23 genera and 104 species. Similarly to Amitermitinae, the group feeds on a number of diverse substrates; wood, soil, and leaf litter. Some are inquilines of other termite species, such as members of the genus Inquilinitermes. The group has a wide distribution, found from the Afrotropical, Australasian, Neotropical to the Oceania and Indomalayan realms.

== Genera ==
- Apsenterotermes
- Capritermes
- Cavitermes
- Cornicapritermes
- Cristatitermes
- Dihoplotermes
- Divinotermes
- Ekphysotermes
- Ephelotermes
- Hapsidotermes
- Hesperotermes
- Inquilinitermes
- Lophotermes
- Macrognathotermes
- Palmitermes
- Paracapritermes
- Protocapritermes
- Quasitermes
- Saxatilitermes
- Spinitermes
- Termes
- Tuberculitermes
- Xylochomitermes
