= Fontanellar gun =

Termite defense mechanism

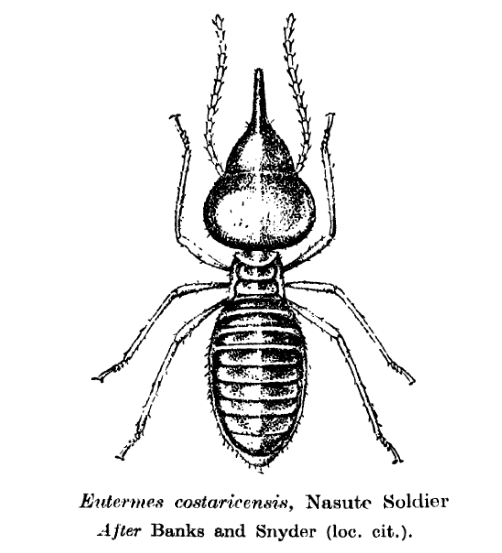
Termite nasute illustration (since reclassified as Nasutitermes corniger)

The fontanellar gun is a termite defense mechanism in the form of a horn-like frontal projection (nasus) on the head of the soldier caste which is capable of expelling chemical weaponry at a distance, a trait exclusive to the subfamily Nasutitermitinae. It is primarily used to ward off predators such as ants.

== Physiology and usage ==
The "gun" is a gland with a duct on the front of the head. It operates by a chemical reaction triggered when the termite contracts its mandibular muscles. The termite is "able to eject the frontal gland material over a distance of many centimeters". The gland material is forced out through the front of the internal nose and its pores, which covers much of the termite's head. Termites have been shown to be extremely accurate with the gun, even though they are blind. The exact nature of how termites retain such accuracy and are able to orient themselves toward their enemy is currently unknown, but it is believed that the ability is olfactory or auditory in nature.

The fired material is glue-like and sticks to objects that it hits, causing the legs of an attacking enemy to become stuck to the ground. Most often, though, a number of termite soldiers will fire upon the enemy and the combined force of the "bullets" will kill the enemy along with covering it in the glue-like substance. It has also been observed that, for those that survive the force of the material, it also causes varying negative effects, likely because of the terpenes contained in the compound. Eventually, if not killed from other effects, the secretion of the termite will kill any enemy insects after 24–48 hours. In comparison, the effect of the secretion on termites of the same species was considerably worse, with the secretion causing death within 5–6 hours.

== Chemical composition ==
The secretion from Tenuirostritermes tenuirostris consists of a mixture of three terpenes, namely 62% pinene, 27% myrcene and 11% limonene. These form a resinous glue resembling pine resin. The secretion contains an alarm pheromone that alerts other soldier termites of an enemy attack and causes them to fire their fontanellar gun. It was discovered that the pinene was also acting as an alarm pheromone while it was forming the composition of the terpenes. Because later arriving termites did not also fire their gun, it is believed that the pinene pheromone lasts for only a brief period of time before dissipating.

== In other termites ==
The Syntermitinae, which were once classified within the Nasutitermitinae in a clade known as the mandibulate nasute termites, are now recognized to be a distinct and not closely related lineage which convergently evolved a nasus that is superficially analogous but not functionally homologous to the nasus of true nasute termites. Unlike true nasutes, all Syntermitinae exhibit soldiers with highly developed mandibles which are physiologically incapable of expelling their frontal gland secretions from the nasus. No other known termite has a frontal apparatus as functionally and morphologically similar to the Nasutitermitinae as the Syntermitinae.
