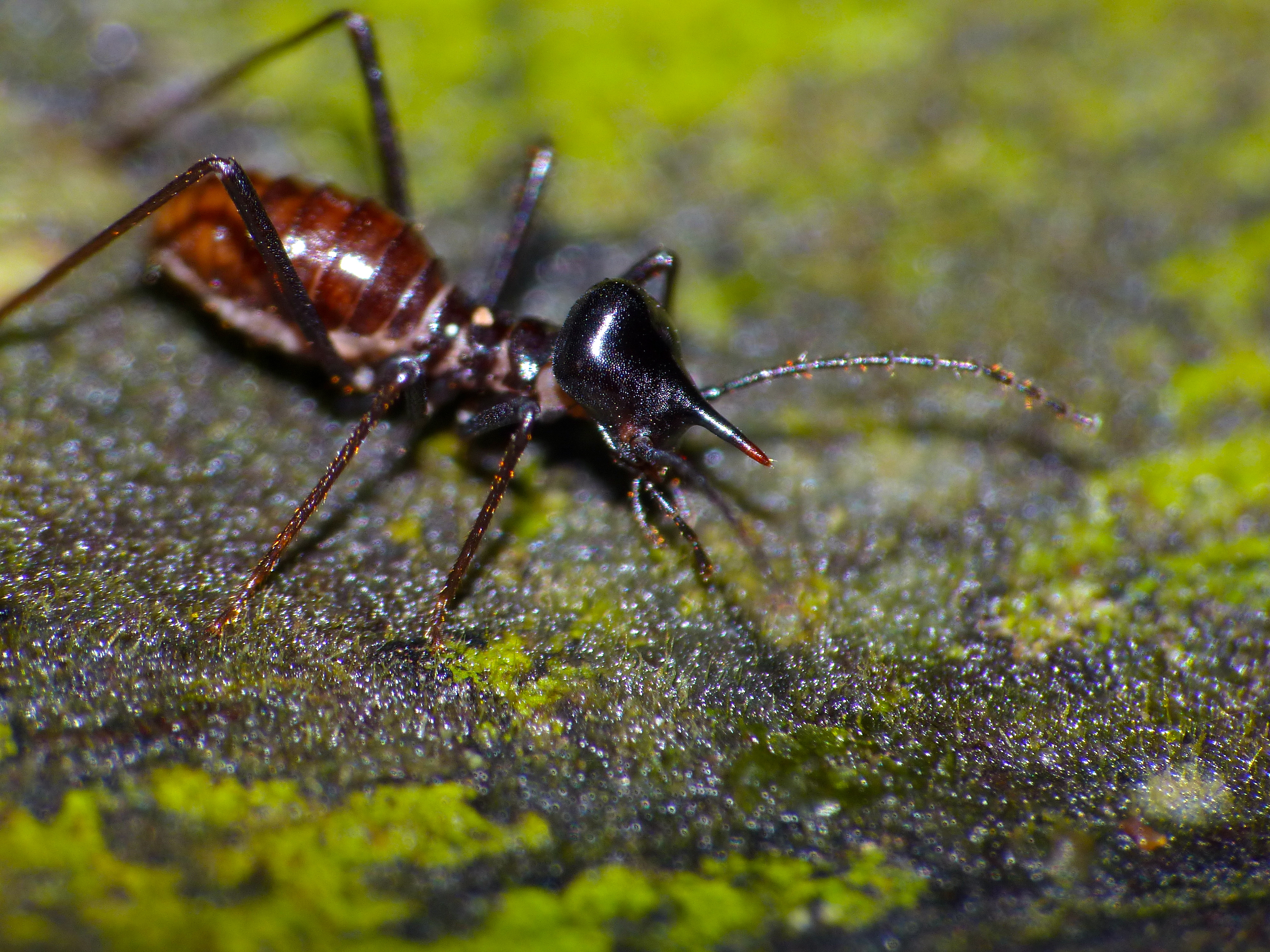
- Hospitalitermes sp

Scientific classification
- Kingdom: Animalia
- Phylum: Arthropoda
- Class: Insecta
- Order: Blattodea
- Infraorder: Isoptera
- Family: Termitidae
- Subfamily: Nasutitermitinae; Hare

Genera
- see text

= Nasutitermitinae =

Subfamily of termites

The Nasutitermitinae is a near cosmopolitan subfamily of higher termites represented by 81 genera and 605 species. The highly derived soldier caste exhibits vestigial mandibles and a protruding fontanellar process on the head, known as the nasus, from which they can "shoot" chemical weaponry. Notable genera include the notorious wood-eating Nasutitermes, and the conspicuous Hospitalitermes and Constrictotermes, both distinguished for their brazen habit of forming extensive foraging trails out in the open.

== Genera ==
The Termite Catalogue lists the following genera:

- Aciculioiditermes
- Aciculitermes
- Afrosubulitermes
- Agnathotermes
- Ahmaditermes
- Ampoulitermes
- Angularitermes
- Anhangatermes
- Antillitermes
- Araujotermes
- Arcotermes
- Atlantitermes
- Australitermes
- Baucaliotermes
- Bulbitermes
- Caetetermes
- Caribitermes
- Ceylonitermellus
- Ceylonitermes
- Coarctotermes
- Coatitermes
- Coendutermes
- Constrictotermes
- Convexitermes
- Cortaritermes
- Cucurbitermes
- Cyranotermes
- Diversitermes
- Diwaitermes
- Eleanoritermes
- Emersonitermes
- Enetotermes
- Ereymatermes
- Eutermellus
- Fulleritermes
- Grallatotermes
- Havilanditermes
- Hirtitermes
- Hospitalitermes
- Kaudernitermes
- Lacessititermes
- Leptomyxotermes
- Leucopitermes
- Longipeditermes
- Macrosubulitermes
- Malagasitermes
- Malaysiotermes
- Mimeutermes
- Mironasutitermes
- Mycterotermes
- Nasopilotermes
- Nasutitermes
- Ngauratermes
- Niuginitermes
- Obtusitermes
- Occasitermes
- Occultitermes
- Oriensubulitermes
- Paraconvexitermes
- Parvitermes
- Periaciculitermes
- Peribulbitermes
- Postsubulitermes
- Rhadinotermes
- Roonwalitermes
- Rotunditermes
- Rounditermes
- Sinonasutitermes
- Sinqasapatermes
- Snootitermes
- Spatulitermes
- Subulioiditermes
- Subulitermes
- Tarditermes
- Tenuirostritermes
- Thailanditermes
- Triangularitermes
- Trinervitermes
- Tumulitermes
- Velocitermes
- Verrucositermes
- Xiaitermes

== Nasutes ==
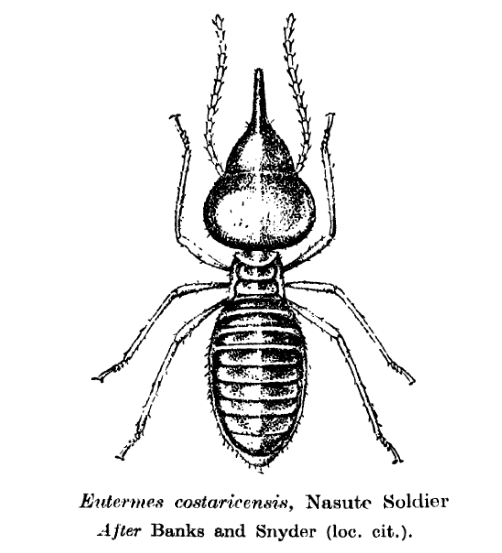
Termite nasute illustration (since reclassified as Nasutitermes corniger)

The fontanellar gun is a defense mechanism in the form of a horn-like frontal projection (nasus) on the head of a specialized nasute soldier caste which is capable of expelling chemical weaponry at a distance, a trait exclusive to the subfamily Nasutitermitinae. It is primarily used to ward off predators such as ants.
