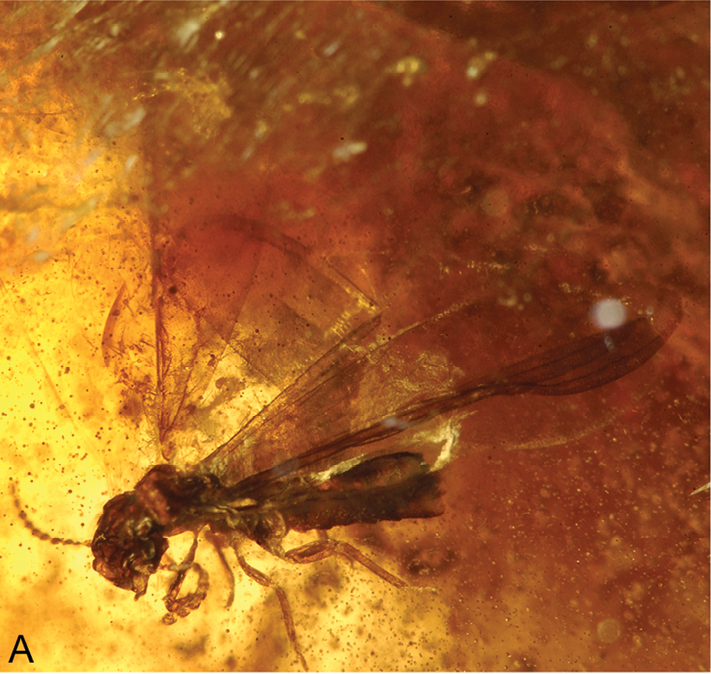
- Nanotermes isaacae in Cambay amber.

Scientific classification
- Kingdom: Animalia
- Phylum: Arthropoda
- Clade: Pancrustacea
- Class: Insecta
- Order: Blattodea
- Infraorder: Isoptera
- Nanorder: Geoisoptera
- Family: Termitidae; Latreille, 1802

Subfamilies
- See text

= Termitidae =

Family of termites

Termitidae is the largest family of termites consisting of 2,125 described species of which are commonly known as the higher termites. They are evolutionarily the most specialised termite group, with their highly compartmentalized hindgut lacking the flagellated protozoans common to "lower termites", which are instead replaced by bacteria and archaea. Whereas lower termites are restricted mostly to woody tissue, higher termites have diverse diets consisting of wood, grass, leaf litter, fungi, lichen, faeces, humus and soil. Around 60% of species rely on soil-feeding alone.

== Systematics ==
The family contains the following subfamilies:

Family Termitidae Latreille, 1802

subfamily Sphaerotermitinae Engel & Krishna, 2004
subfamily Macrotermitinae Kemner, 1934, nomen protectum [ICZN 2003] (synonyms: Acanthotermitinae Sjöstedt, 1926, nomen rejiciendum [ICZN 2003]; Odontotermitini Weidner, 1956)
subfamily Foraminitermitinae Holmgren, 1912 (synonym: Pseudomicrotermitinae Holmgren, 1912)
subfamily Apicotermitinae Grassé & Noirot, 1954 [1955] (synonym: Indotermitidae Roonwal & Sen Sarma in Roonwal, 1958)
subfamily Microcerotermitinae Holmgren, 1910
subfamily Syntermitinae Engel & Krishna, 2004 (synonym: Cornitermitinae Ensaf et al., 2004, nomen nudum)
subfamily Forficulitermitinae Hellemans, Engel, & Bourguignon, 2024
subfamily Engelitermitinae Romero Arias, Roisin, & Scheffrahn, 2024
subfamily Crepititermitinae Hellemans, Engel, & Bourguignon, 2024
subfamily Protohamitermitinae Hellemans, Engel, & Bourguignon, 2024
subfamily Cylindrotermitinae Hellemans, Engel, & Bourguignon, 2024
subfamily Neocapritermitinae Hellemans, Engel, & Bourguignon, 2024
subfamily Nasutitermitinae Hare, 1937
subfamily Promirotermitinae Hellemans, Engel, & Bourguignon, 2024
subfamily Mirocapritermitinae Kemner, 1934
subfamily Amitermitinae Kemner, 1934
subfamily Cubitermitinae Weidner, 1956
subfamily Termitinae Latreille, 1802 (synonyms: Mirotermitini Weidner, 1956; Capritermitini Weidner, 1956)

Current phylogeny of the Termitidae:

- Termitidae
  - - Sphaerotermitinae
    - Macrotermitinae
  - - Foraminitermitinae
    - - Apicotermitinae
      - - - Microcerotermitinae
          - Syntermitinae
        - - - Forficulitermitinae
            - Engelitermitinae
          - - - Crepititermitinae
              - - Protohamitermitinae
                - Cylindrotermitinae
            - - Neocapritermitinae
              - - Nasutitermitinae
                - - Promirotermitinae
                  - - - Mirocapritermitinae
                      - Amitermitinae
                    - - Termitinae
                      - Cubitermitinae

== Identification ==
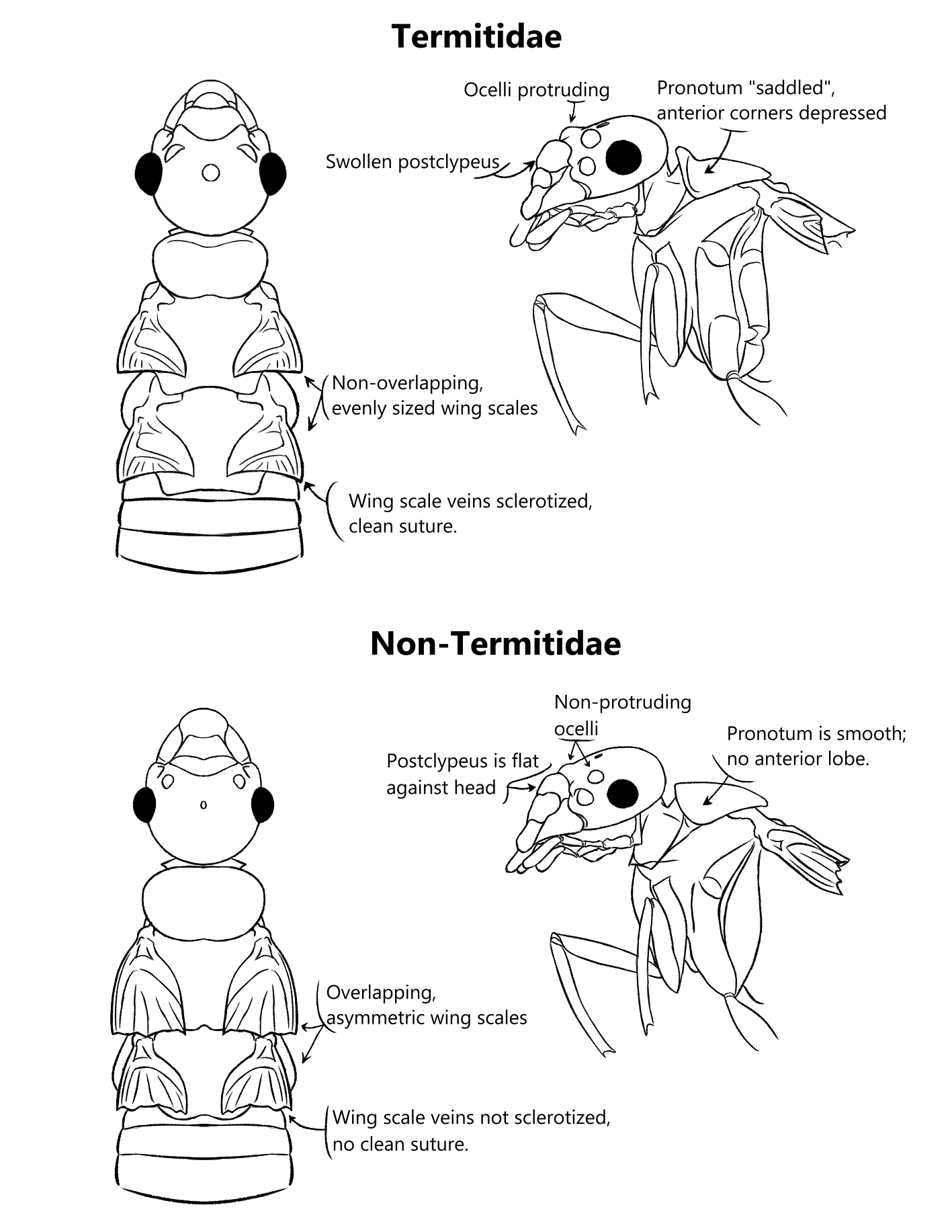

Imago forewing and hindwing scales either evenly or closely sized and non-overlapping. Both forewing and hindwing scales have a developed suture with strongly sclerotized and reduced veins. Ocelli of imago typically (but not always) protruding above head capsule.

Pronotum of all castes is "saddled", with a pronounced anterior lobe as a result of the pronotum's anterior corners being depressed. Postclypeus of the worker and imago both swollen and protruding from head capsule
