= List of termites of Sri Lanka =

Sri Lanka is a tropical island situated close to the southern tip of India. The invertebrate fauna is as large as it is common to other regions of the world. There are about 2 million species of arthropods found in the world, and still it is counting. So many new species are discover up to this time also. So it is very complicated and difficult to summarize the exact number of species found within a certain region.

The following list is about Termites recorded in Sri Lanka.

== Termite ==
Phylum: Arthropoda
Class: Insecta
Order: Blattodea
Infra Order: Isoptera

Termites are eusocial insects that are classified at the taxonomic rank of infraorder Isoptera, or as epifamily Termitoidae within the cockroach order Blattodea. Termites were once classified in a separate order from cockroaches, but recent phylogenetic studies indicate that they evolved from close ancestors of cockroaches during the Jurassic or Triassic. It is possible, however, that the first termites emerged during the Permian or even the Carboniferous. Approximately 3,106 species are currently described, with a few hundred more left to be described.

In 1913, Green compiled a concise catalogue for isopterans in Sri Lanka. The first known study on termites was done by Wasmann during British period. Since then, many local and overseas scientists engaged on many studies, some in crop plantations as well. A detailed work on Sri Lankan termites was done by University of Peradeniya in 2012. According to this checklist, which is based on 1893 literature, a total of 64 species of termites in 27 genera and 4 families are recorded from Sri Lanka.

Endemic species are denoted as E.

=== Family: Hodotermitidae - Harvester termites ===
- Anacanthotermes viarum

=== Family: Kalotermitidae - Drywood termites ===
- Postelectrotermes militaris
- Neotermes greeni
- Neotermes kemneri
- Kalotermes jepsoni
- Glyptotermes ceylonicus
- Glyptotermes dilatatus
- Glyptotermes minutus
- Bifiditermes pintoi
- Cryptotermes bengalensis
- Cryptotermes ceylonicus
- Cryptotermes cynocephalus
- Cryptotermes domesticus
- Cryptotermes dudleyi
- Cryptotermes perforans - E

=== Family: Rhinotermitidae - Subterranean termites ===
- Coptotermes ceylonicus
- Coptotermes emersoni
- Coptotermes formosanus
- Coptotermes gaurii
- Coptotermes gestroi
- Heterotermes ceylonicus
- Heterotermes indicola
- Termitogeton umbilicatus - E
- Prorhinotermes flavus

=== Family: Termitidae - Higher termites ===
- Macrotermes convulsionarius
- Odontotermes assmuthi
- Odontotermes ceylonicus
- Odontotermes escherichi
- Odontotermes feae
- Odontotermes globicola
- Odontotermes horni
- Odontotermes koenigi
- Odontotermes preliminaris
- Odontotermes redemanni
- Odontotermes taprobanes
- Hypotermes obscuriceps
- Hypotermes winifredi
- Microtermes macronotus
- Microtermes obesi
- Eurytermes ceylonicus
- Speculitermes sinhalensis
- Nasutitermes ceylonicus
- Nasutitermes horni
- Nasutitermes lacustris
- Nasutitermes oculatus
- Ceylonitermes escherichi
- Hospitalitermes monoceros
- Trinervitermes biformis
- Trinervitermes rubidus
- Ceylonitermellus hantanae
- Ceylonitermellus kotuae
- Synhamitermes ceylonicus
- Synhamitermes colombensis - E
- Microcerotermes bugnioni
- Microcerotermes cylindriceps
- Microcerotermes greeni
- Microcerotermes heimi
- Microcerotermes minor
- Angulitermes ceylonicus
- Dicuspiditermes hutsoni
- Dicuspiditermes incola
- Dicuspiditermes nemorosus
- Pericapritermes ceylonicus
- Pericapritermes speciosus

== Notes ==
A sign of termite infestation that is very poignant is the appearance of swarmers or alates. A termite colony can get overpopulated. A new queen will strike out on her own to begin a new colony. She needs to mate with a male of the species and find a new area in which to start building her nest. Growing wings and flying enables her to do this. So each season, alates emerge from the colonies and take flight. When they do, and what triggers them to come out depend mostly on the weather and the population pressure in the termite colony. High humidity, and warm weather favour these manifestations.
