= Glyptotermes =

Scientific classification
- Domain: Eukaryota
- Kingdom: Animalia
- Phylum: Arthropoda
- Class: Insecta
- Order: Blattodea
- Infraorder: Isoptera
- Family: Kalotermitidae
- Genus: Glyptotermes; Froggatt, 1897

Species
- See text

Genus of termites

Glyptotermes is a genus of termite in the family Kalotermitidae. With 127 species worldwide as of 2013, is the family's most speciose genus, and the second most speciose in the New World after Cryptotermes.

Entomologist Rudolf H. Scheffrahn argued in 2018 that the paucity of Glyptotermes records from throughout much of the Caribbean Basin and South America was caused by a field sampling bias toward non-kalotermitids. The first records of this genus from Bolivia, Colombia, Ecuador, French Guiana, Guatemala, Honduras, Paraguay, Peru, and much of the Lesser Antilles were provided by Scheffrahn in 2019.

Glyptotermes species have a rather high wood moisture requirement and, therefore, are not found in arid parts of the Neotropics and are likewise, not economically important. Although the imago morphology is quite conserved, the head capsules of Glyptotermes soldiers are variously adorned with protuberances and rugosities, and robust mandibles that facilitate their identification.

== Selected species ==
- Glyptotermes canellae (Müller, 1873)
- Glyptotermes ceylonicus Holmgren, 1911
- Glyptotermes chiraharitae Amina & Rajmohana, 2016
- Glyptotermes dilatatus (Bugnion & Popoff, 1910)
- Glyptotermes hickmani Rudolf H. Scheffrahn, 2021
- Glyptotermes minutus Kemner, 1932
