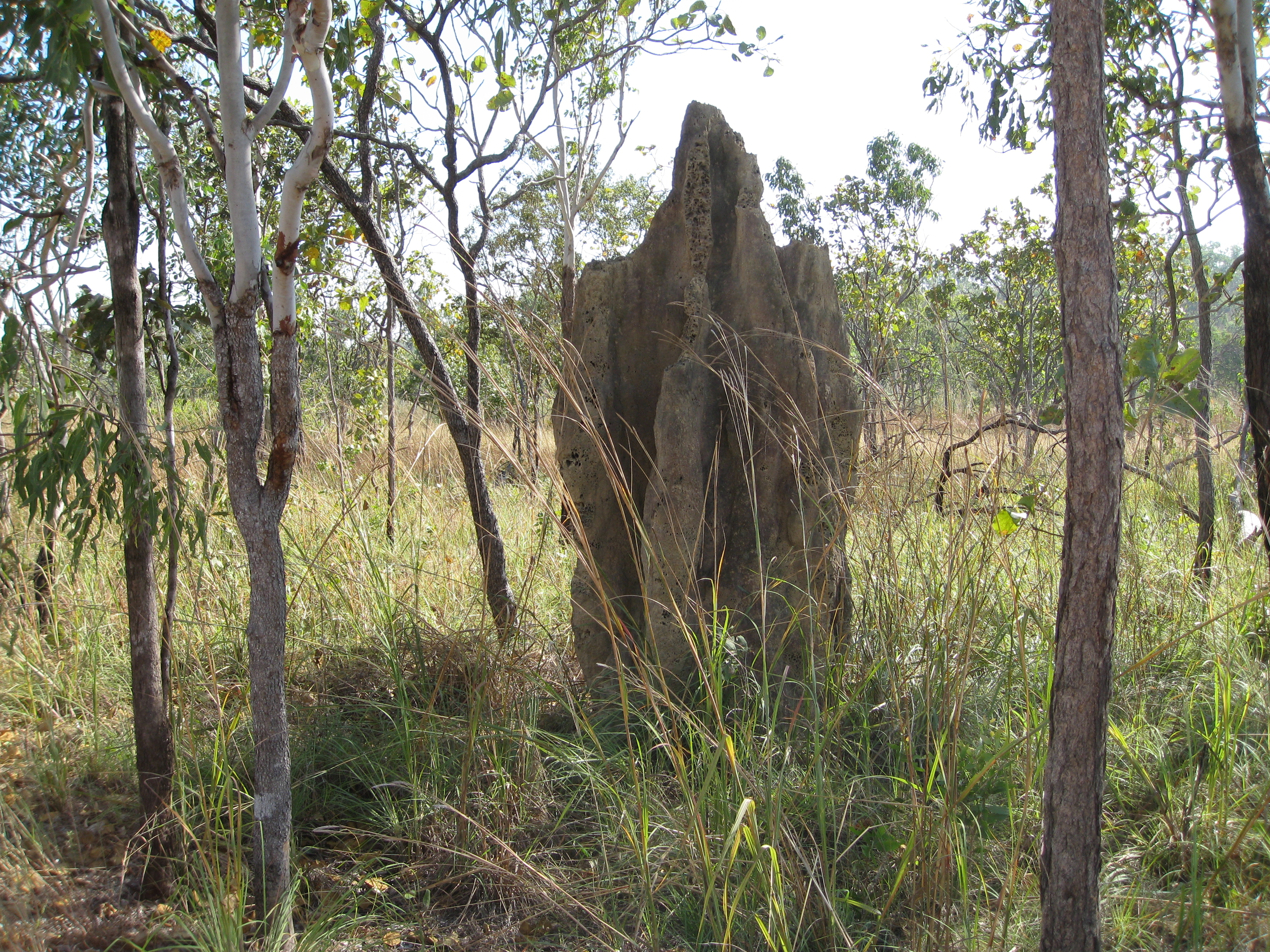
- Mound of cathedral termite, Nasutitermes triodiae

Scientific classification
- Kingdom: Animalia
- Phylum: Arthropoda
- Clade: Pancrustacea
- Class: Insecta
- Order: Blattodea
- Infraorder: Isoptera
- Family: Termitidae
- Genus: Nasutitermes
- Species: N. triodiae

Binomial name
- Nasutitermes triodiae (Froggatt, 1898)

= Nasutitermes triodiae =

Australian termite species

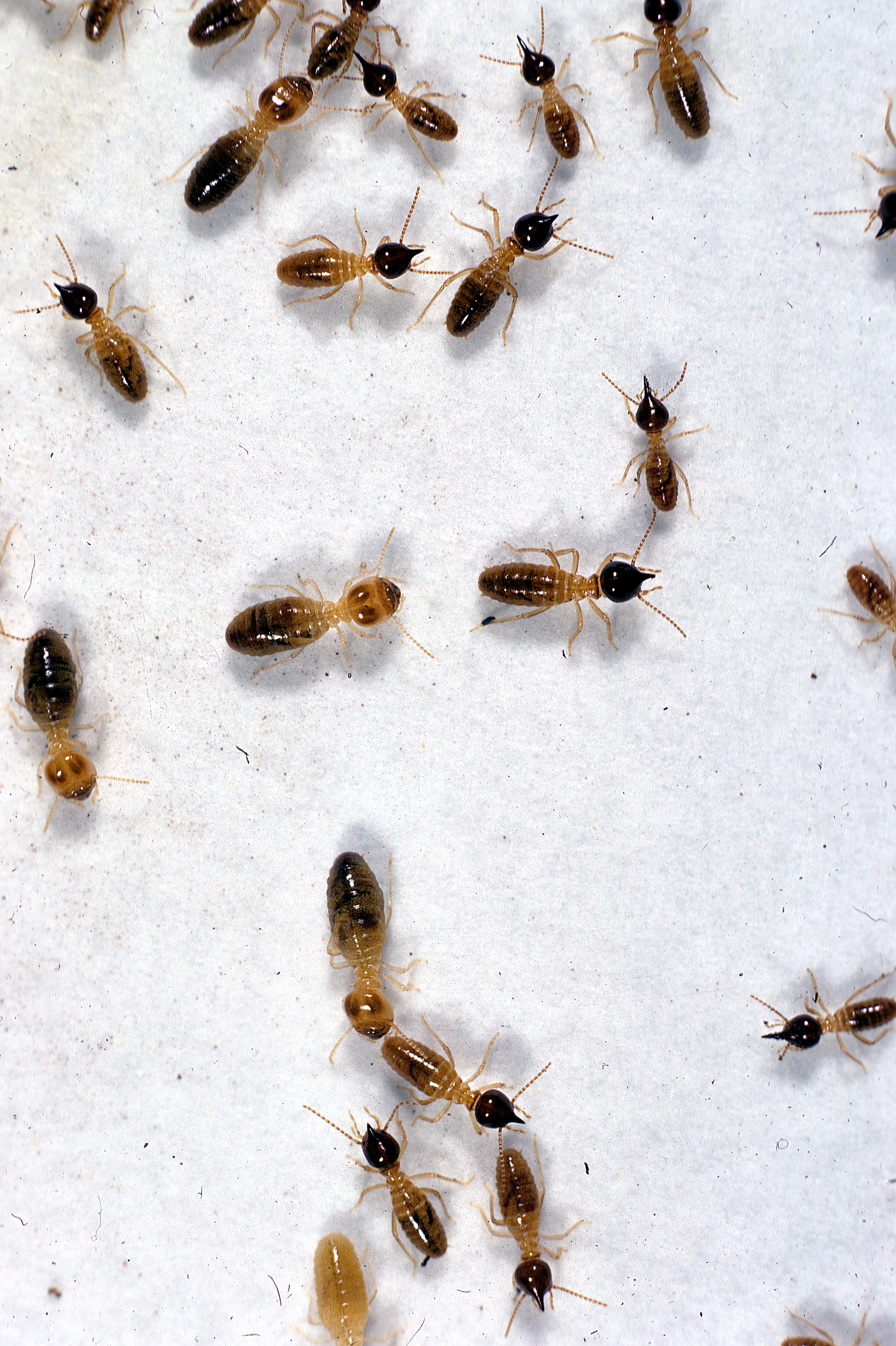
Nasutitermes triodiae workers and "snouted" soldier castes

Nasutitermes triodiae, also known as the cathedral termite, is a grass-eating species of Nasutitermitinae termite that can be found in Northern Territory, Australia. It is also sometimes referred to as the spinifex termite, since it is found in the spinifex (also known as Triodia) grasslands. Very little research has been done on the underground nature of this species.

== Description and behaviour ==
=== Mounds ===
Nasutitermes triodiae mostly live in Northern Territory, Australia. They are known for their skill at building cathedral-shaped mounds. Mounds of the cathedral termites on the dry plains of the Northwest Territory dominate the landscape and often tower more than 15 ft (4.6 m) in height. Constructed from mud, plant parts, and termite saliva and feces, the columns of the mound are extraordinarily tough and able to withstand the rigors of wind, rain, heat, and hungry predators. Construction of the hollow columns allows for internal circulation of air from the cooler soil at the base of the mound to the warmer top. This ventilation technique provides a central air-conditioning system that enables the colony to remain relatively cool even when the external temperatures are very hot.

=== Defense mechanisms ===
When there is a breach in the nest, nasute soldiers pour out to defend the colony. Termite soldier castes can be distinguished by their dark brown head and elongated, tubular snout called a nasus. The termites create and store a mixture of monoterpenes, sesquiterpenes and diterpenes which can then be ejected from their long, horn-like nasus. The secretions are able to entangle, irritate and repel invaders. If a human were to stick their finger in the mound, it would be covered in the defensive fluid.

=== Diet ===
Nasutitermes triodiae often feed on Triodia, which are common in the grasslands where they can be found. It does not matter if the plant material is living or dead. To avoid the heat and sunlight, the termites create tube-like structures of mud toward their food source. These tubes are then built around the grass, where the spinifex is then consumed. The hollow tubes left behind are used to reach the other blades of grass.
