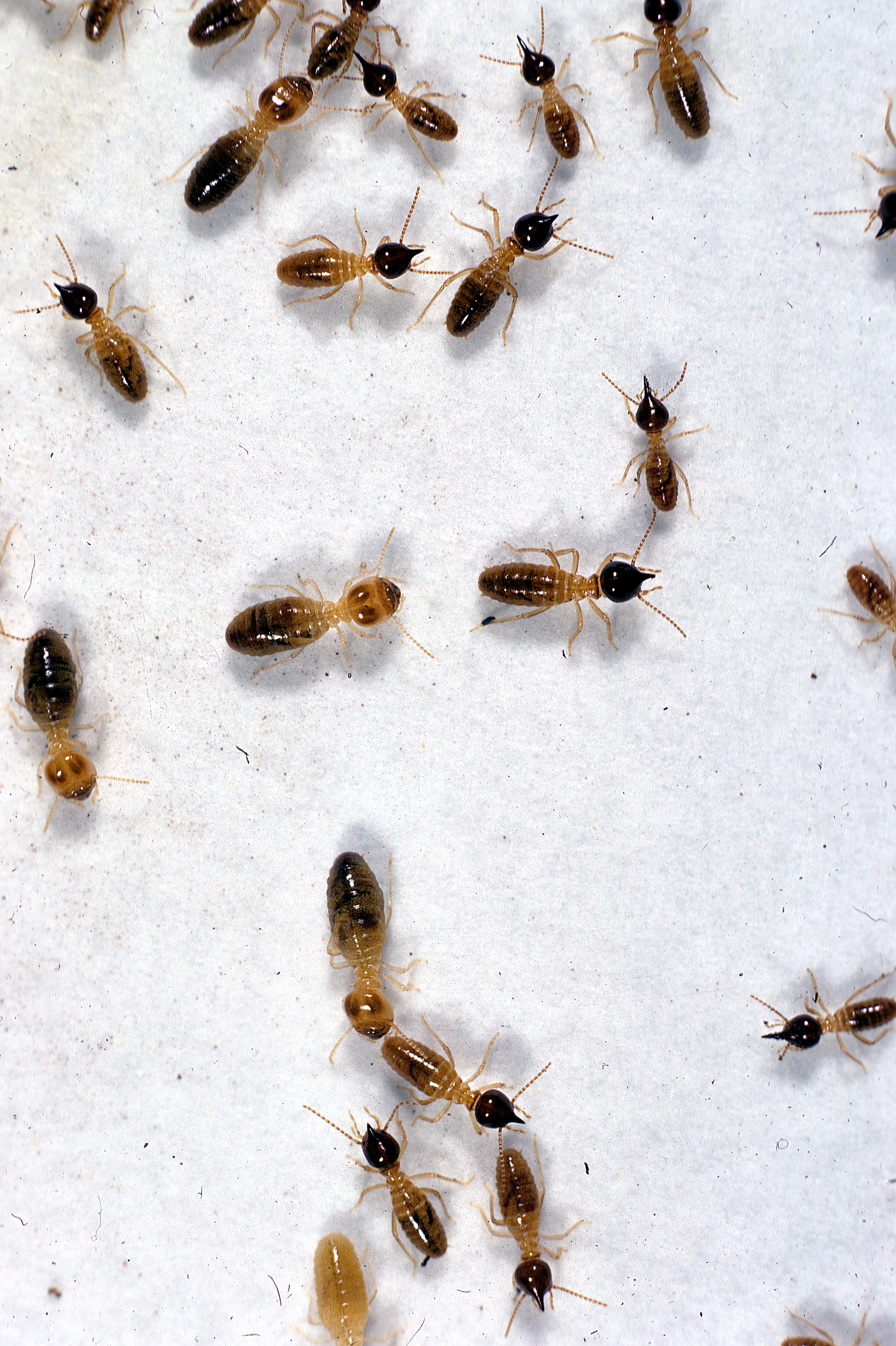
- N. triodiae soldiers and workers

Scientific classification
- Domain: Eukaryota
- Kingdom: Animalia
- Phylum: Arthropoda
- Class: Insecta
- Order: Blattodea
- Infraorder: Isoptera
- Family: Termitidae
- Subfamily: Nasutitermitinae
- Genus: Nasutitermes; Dudley, 1890

Synonyms
- Milesnasitermes Dudley, 1890; Havilanditermes Light, 1930; Fletcheritermes Sen-Sarma, 1965; Alstonitermes Thakur, 1976; Mironasutitermes Gao & He, 1990

= Nasutitermes =

Genus of termites

Nasutitermes is a genus of termites with a tropical distribution world-wide.

== Species ==
The Termite Catalogue lists the following:

1. Nasutitermes acajutlae
2. Nasutitermes acangussu
3. Nasutitermes acutus
4. Nasutitermes aduncus
5. Nasutitermes alticola
6. Nasutitermes amboinensis
7. Nasutitermes anamalaiensis
8. Nasutitermes anjiensis
9. Nasutitermes anoniensis
10. Nasutitermes aquilinus
11. Nasutitermes araujoi
12. Nasutitermes arborum
13. Nasutitermes arenarius
14. Nasutitermes aruensis
15. Nasutitermes atripennis
16. Nasutitermes balingtauagensis
17. Nasutitermes banksi
18. Nasutitermes bannaensis
19. Nasutitermes bashanensis
20. Nasutitermes benjamini
21. Nasutitermes bikpelanus
22. Nasutitermes bivalens
23. Nasutitermes boengiensis
24. Nasutitermes boetoni
25. Nasutitermes bolivari
26. Nasutitermes bolivianus
27. Nasutitermes brachynasutus
28. Nasutitermes brevioculatus
29. Nasutitermes brevipilus
30. Nasutitermes brevirostris
31. Nasutitermes brunneus
32. Nasutitermes bulbiceps
33. Nasutitermes bulbus
34. Nasutitermes callimorphus
35. Nasutitermes camerunensis
36. Nasutitermes carnarvonensis
37. Nasutitermes castaneus
38. Nasutitermes celebensis
39. Nasutitermes centraliensis
40. Nasutitermes ceylonicus
41. Nasutitermes changningensis
42. Nasutitermes chapmani
43. Nasutitermes chaquimayensis
44. Nasutitermes cherraensis
45. Nasutitermes chhotanii
46. Nasutitermes choui
47. Nasutitermes chrysopleura
48. Nasutitermes coalescens
49. Nasutitermes colimae
50. Nasutitermes communis
51. Nasutitermes comorensis
52. Nasutitermes comstockae
53. Nasutitermes corniger (Motschulsky, 1855)
  type species (as Eutermes costalis Holmgren, 1910)
54. Nasutitermes corporaali
55. Nasutitermes coxipoensis
56. Nasutitermes crassicornis
57. Nasutitermes crassus
58. Nasutitermes curtinasus
59. Nasutitermes dasyopsis
60. Nasutitermes dendrophilus
61. Nasutitermes devrayi
62. Nasutitermes diabolus
63. Nasutitermes dimorphus
64. Nasutitermes dixoni
65. Nasutitermes dobonensis
66. Nasutitermes dolichorhinos
67. Nasutitermes dudgeoni
68. Nasutitermes dunensis
69. Nasutitermes ecuadorianus
70. Nasutitermes ehrhardti
71. Nasutitermes elegantulus
72. Nasutitermes emersoni
73. Nasutitermes ephratae
74. Nasutitermes eucalypti
75. Nasutitermes exitiosus
76. Nasutitermes fabricii
77. Nasutitermes falciformis
78. Nasutitermes fengkaiensis
79. Nasutitermes ferranti
80. Nasutitermes feytaudi
81. Nasutitermes fletcheri
82. Nasutitermes fulleri
83. Nasutitermes fumigatus
84. Nasutitermes fuscipennis
85. Nasutitermes gaigei
86. Nasutitermes gardneri
87. Nasutitermes gardneriformis
88. Nasutitermes garoensis
89. Nasutitermes glabritergus
90. Nasutitermes globiceps
91. Nasutitermes gracilirostris
92. Nasutitermes gracilis
93. Nasutitermes grandinasus
94. Nasutitermes graveolus
95. Nasutitermes guayanae
96. Nasutitermes guizhouensis
97. Nasutitermes haddoensis
98. Nasutitermes havilandi
99. Nasutitermes hejiangensis
100. Nasutitermes heterodon
101. Nasutitermes hexianensis
102. Nasutitermes hirticeps
103. Nasutitermes horni
104. Nasutitermes huangshanensis
105. Nasutitermes hubbardi
106. Nasutitermes inclinasus
107. Nasutitermes indicola
108. Nasutitermes infuscatus
109. Nasutitermes itapocuensis
110. Nasutitermes jacobsoni
111. Nasutitermes jalpaigurensis
112. Nasutitermes jaraguae
113. Nasutitermes javanicus
114. Nasutitermes jiangxiensis
115. Nasutitermes johoricus
116. Nasutitermes kali
117. Nasutitermes kemneri
118. Nasutitermes kempae
119. Nasutitermes kimberleyensis
120. Nasutitermes kinoshitai
121. Nasutitermes koiari
122. Nasutitermes krishna
123. Nasutitermes lacustris
124. Nasutitermes latifrons
125. Nasutitermes latus
126. Nasutitermes leponcei
127. Nasutitermes lividus
128. Nasutitermes llinquipatensis
129. Nasutitermes longiarticulatus
130. Nasutitermes longinasoides
131. Nasutitermes longinasus
132. Nasutitermes longipennis
133. Nasutitermes longirostratus
134. Nasutitermes longirostris
135. Nasutitermes longwangshanensis
136. Nasutitermes lujae
137. Nasutitermes luzonicus
138. Nasutitermes machengensis
139. Nasutitermes macrocephalus
140. Nasutitermes magnus
141. Nasutitermes maheensis
142. Nasutitermes major
143. Nasutitermes makassarensis
144. Nasutitermes mangshanensis
145. Nasutitermes maniseri
146. Nasutitermes matangensis
147. Nasutitermes mauritianus
148. Nasutitermes maximus
149. Nasutitermes medoensis
150. Nasutitermes meinerti
151. Nasutitermes meridianus
152. Nasutitermes mindanensis
153. Nasutitermes minimus
154. Nasutitermes minor
155. Nasutitermes mirabilis
156. Nasutitermes mojosensis
157. Nasutitermes mollis
158. Nasutitermes montanae
159. Nasutitermes moratus
160. Nasutitermes motu
161. Nasutitermes muli
162. Nasutitermes myersi
163. Nasutitermes neonanus
164. Nasutitermes neoparvus
165. Nasutitermes nigriceps
166. Nasutitermes nomadensis
167. Nasutitermes nordenskioldi
168. Nasutitermes novarumhebridarum
169. Nasutitermes obscurus
170. Nasutitermes obtusimandibulus
171. Nasutitermes octopilis
172. Nasutitermes oculatus
173. Nasutitermes olidus
174. Nasutitermes orthonasus
175. Nasutitermes oshimai
176. Nasutitermes ovatus
177. Nasutitermes ovipennis
178. Nasutitermes palaoensis
179. Nasutitermes panayensis
180. Nasutitermes parviceps
181. Nasutitermes parvonasutus
182. Nasutitermes parvus
183. Nasutitermes perparvus
184. Nasutitermes peruanus
185. Nasutitermes pictus
186. Nasutitermes pilosus
187. Nasutitermes pinocchio
188. Nasutitermes planiusculus
189. Nasutitermes pluriarticulatus
190. Nasutitermes pluvialis
191. Nasutitermes princeps
192. Nasutitermes proatripennis
193. Nasutitermes profuscipennis
194. Nasutitermes projectus
195. Nasutitermes proximus
196. Nasutitermes qimenensis
197. Nasutitermes qingjiensis
198. Nasutitermes rectangularis
199. Nasutitermes regularis
200. Nasutitermes retus
201. Nasutitermes rippertii
202. Nasutitermes roboratus
203. Nasutitermes rotundatus
204. Nasutitermes rotundus
205. Nasutitermes saleierensis
206. Nasutitermes sanctaeanae
207. Nasutitermes sandakensis
208. Nasutitermes schoutedeni
209. Nasutitermes seghersi
210. Nasutitermes shangchengensis
211. Nasutitermes simaluris
212. Nasutitermes similis
213. Nasutitermes simulans
214. Nasutitermes sinensis
215. Nasutitermes smithi
216. Nasutitermes stricticeps
217. Nasutitermes subtibetanus
218. Nasutitermes subtibialis
219. Nasutitermes suknensis
220. Nasutitermes surinamensis
221. Nasutitermes takasagoensis
222. Nasutitermes tandoni
223. Nasutitermes tatarendae
224. Nasutitermes taylori
225. Nasutitermes thanensis
226. Nasutitermes tianmuensis
227. Nasutitermes tiantongensis
228. Nasutitermes tibetanus
229. Nasutitermes timoriensis
230. Nasutitermes tipuanicus
231. Nasutitermes torresi
232. Nasutitermes tredecimarticulatus
233. Nasutitermes triloki
234. Nasutitermes triodiae
235. Nasutitermes tsaii
236. Nasutitermes tungsalangensis
237. Nasutitermes unduliceps
238. Nasutitermes vadoni
239. Nasutitermes vallis
240. Nasutitermes vishnu
241. Nasutitermes walkeri
242. Nasutitermes wheeleri
243. Nasutitermes xingshanensis

Note: "N. hainanensis" is probably Sinonasutitermes hainanensis Li & Ping, 1986
