= Cryptotermes mobydicki =

Scientific classification
- Kingdom: Animalia
- Phylum: Arthropoda
- Clade: Pancrustacea
- Class: Insecta
- Order: Blattodea
- Infraorder: Isoptera
- Family: Kalotermitidae
- Genus: Cryptotermes
- Species: C. mobydicki

Binomial name
- Cryptotermes mobydicki Rudolf H. Scheffrahn et al 2025

Species of termite

Cryptotermes mobydicki is a species of termite of the genus Cryptotermes in the family Kalotermitidae (drywood termites) discovered in French Guiana (South America). The species is named after Moby Dick, the giant sperm whale from the novel Moby Dick by Herman Melville, due to the similarity of the shape of their heads.

== Description ==
The head is 1.33–1.36 mm (0.5–0.7 in) long, 0.79–0.99 mm (0.7–0.9 in) wide, and the mandibles are about 0.4 mm (0.4 in). Among Cryptotermes soldiers worldwide, C. mobydicki is distinguished by the following features: the head capsule is very long and narrow; the frontal protuberance and frontal horns are absent; and when viewed from above, the mandibles are significantly obscured by an elongated frontal process. The antennae consist of 11 segments. The antennal segment formula is 2 > 3 = 4 < 5. The head capsule is black, elongated in dorsal view, tapering toward the blunt frontal process; several setae are located along the lateral margins. The frontal process and the vertex are decorated with wavy longitudinal rugosity. The occiput is chestnut-brown, without rugosity. The pronotum is yellowish-orange; the anterior margin is darker, curved upwards, weakly serrated; the posterior and lateral margins are evenly rounded, with several setae of different lengths. Lateral view: the frontal process is slightly curved downwards; it covers the lower jaw for about 1.4 times the length of the entire head capsule. The frontal crest (cephalic carina) is absent. The genal horns are slightly curved under the antennal pits; the frontal horns are absent. Oblique view: mandibles horn-shaped, curved inward. Frontal process with a shallow notch.

== Taxonomy ==
The species Cryptotermes mobydicki was first described in 2025 by American entomologist Rudolf H. Scheffrahn (University of Florida, Davie, Florida, United States). Cryptotermes mobydicki is placed in a phylogenetic construct based on the mitochondrial genome, related to other endemic Neotropical and Central American species of Cryptotermes, namely C. mangoldi, C. parvifrons, C. cymatofrons, C. rotundiceps and C. cavifrons

Cryptotermes mobydicki is so distinctive among the drywood termites (Kalotermitidae) that the authors initially considered it a new or different genus. Results of a phylogenetic reconstruction based on the mitochondrial genome confirmed its identity as a species within the genus Cryptotermes. Also unexpected was that C. mobydicki from French Guiana shares a clade with C. mangoldi from coastal Colombia and the Dominican Republic and C. parvifrons from Trinidad and Tobago and the island of Grenada. However, soldiers of other South and Central American Cryptotermes species, which have square head capsules and protruding mandibles, do not have features similar to C. mobydicki.

== Etymology ==
The specific name C. mobydicki honors Moby Dick, the giant sperm whale from the novel by Hermann Melville, due to the similarity of their heads. The lateral view of the frontal process and the elongated head of the soldier resembles that of a sperm whale. In both organisms, the mandibles are covered from above by the head, and the whale's eye and the termite's antennal nest are positioned relatively similarly.

== Distribution ==
It is found in French Guiana (South America). The type series was found near Petit Saut, Sinnamary River (5.0684°N 53.0429°W); 42 m above sea level.

== See also ==
- Mastotermes nepropadyom
