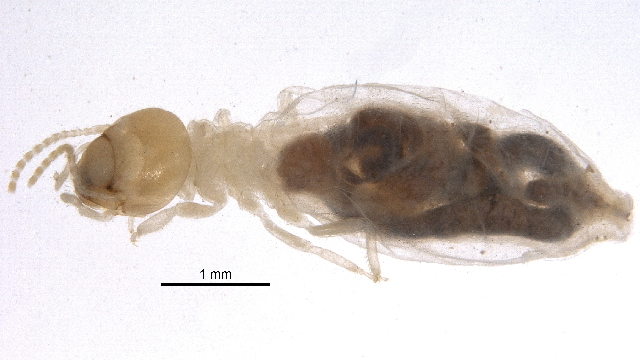
- Termitogeton planus

Scientific classification
- Kingdom: Animalia
- Phylum: Arthropoda
- Clade: Pancrustacea
- Class: Insecta
- Order: Blattodea
- Infraorder: Isoptera
- Family: Termitogetonidae; Hellemans et al., 2024
- Genus: Termitogeton; Desneux, 1904

Species
- Termitogeton planus; Termitogeton umbilicatus

= Termitogeton =

Genus of termites

The Termitogetonidae is a monogeneric family of Neoisopteran termites, represented by the single genus Termitogeton. Termitogeton is represented by only two extant wood-feeding species, T. umbilicatus and T. planus, and the genus is known only from the Indomalayan and Oceania realms.
