= Ceylonitermellus =

Scientific classification
- Kingdom: Animalia
- Phylum: Arthropoda
- Clade: Pancrustacea
- Class: Insecta
- Order: Blattodea
- Infraorder: Isoptera
- Family: Termitidae
- Subfamily: Nasutitermitinae
- Genus: Ceylonitermellus; Emerson, 1960

Type species
- Ceylonitermellus hantanae Homlgren, 1911

Genus of termite

Ceylonitermellus is a genus of termites endemic to the oriental region.

== Species ==
- Ceylonitermellus hantanae
- Ceylonitermellus kotuae
- Ceylonitermellus sahyadriensis
