= Glyptotermes dilatatus =

Scientific classification
- Kingdom: Animalia
- Phylum: Arthropoda
- Class: Insecta
- Order: Blattodea
- Infraorder: Isoptera
- Family: Kalotermitidae
- Genus: Glyptotermes
- Species: G. dilatatus

Binomial name
- Glyptotermes dilatatus (Bugnion & Popoff, 1910)

Synonyms
- Calotermes dilatatus Bugnion & Popoff, 1910

Species of termite

The Low-country tea termite, (Glyptotermes dilatatus), also known as Low country live wood termite, is a species of damp wood termite of the genus Glyptotermes. It is endemic to high elevations Sri Lanka. It is a major pest of tea in low country area of Sri Lanka.

== Importance ==
Termites usually attack leaves, and stems of the plant, and sometimes whole plant. Initial attack is by swarmers and they bore within the tissues and feed on internal tissues. Severe infections can give pitted appearance to bark. Destroyed heart wood produce a honeycomb appearance. Infection spread very easily throughout the field with few attacks.

== Control ==
In tea plantations, pruning and crop sanitation is important to avoid termite attack. Usage of Gliricidia sepium, which is a shade tree in fields can provide additional host to the termite to attack. Thus economical plants can be survived. Immediate burning of affected plant parts is important to reduce spread. Planting resistant varieties is also practiced in many areas. In addition to these measures, biological control is also effective. Laboratory cultures of entomopathogenic nematodes such as Heterorhabditis species is an effective method.

== Host plants ==
- Artocarpus heterophyllus
- Coffea canephora
- Delonix regia
- Erythrina subumbrans
- Ficus amplissima
- Hevea brasiliensis
- Ligustrum robustum
- Magnolia grandiflora
- Moringa oleifera
- Syzygium aromaticum
- Theobroma cacao
