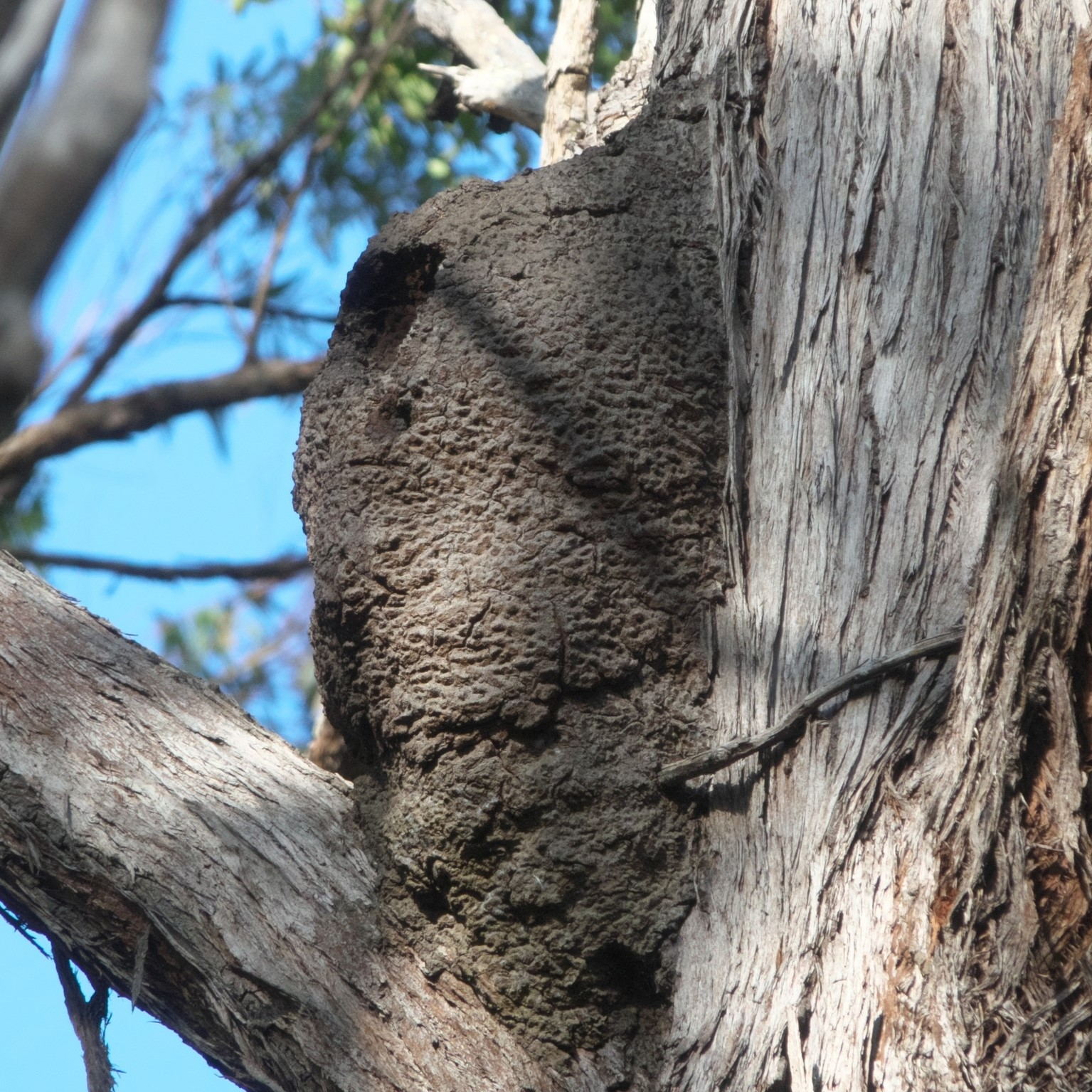
- Tree termite nest

Scientific classification
- Kingdom: Animalia
- Phylum: Arthropoda
- Class: Insecta
- Order: Blattodea
- Infraorder: Isoptera
- Family: Termitidae
- Genus: Nasutitermes
- Species: N. walkeri

Binomial name
- Nasutitermes walkeri (Hill, 1942)

= Nasutitermes walkeri =

Species of termite

Nasutitermes walkeri, commonly known as the tree termite, is a species of arboreal termite found in eastern New South Wales and southeastern Queensland, Australia.

== Description ==
The soldier termites of this species have rounded heads, long straight mandibles and yellowish-brown bodies. They are between 5 and 7 mm (0.20 and 0.28 in) long.

== Distribution and habitat ==
Nasutitermes walkeri is endemic to eastern Australia where it is found in eastern New South Wales and southeastern Queensland. It is found in mountains and near the coast, mostly in scrubland and wooded areas.

== Behaviour ==
The nests of Nasutitermes walkeri are initially established in the crowns of trees at sites where there is some damage to the timber from fire or decay. A more substantial nest is later constructed higher up, sometimes as high as 20 m (66 ft) above the ground. The outside of the nest has a thin, papery surface and the internal structure is also fragile. The termites feed mainly at ground level and they create tubes down the trunk of the tree and then surface tubes or subterranean passages through the soil to Feed on wood. Can be a pest, feeding on timber in buildings. Nests are common on ironbark and stringybark trees and are often used as nesting sites for kingfishers. https://bie.ala.org.au/species/urn:lsid:biodiversity.org.au:afd.taxon:109b4b53-08a4-4da1-a780-8b7d1ac3248e
