= Synhamitermes =

Scientific classification
- Domain: Eukaryota
- Kingdom: Animalia
- Phylum: Arthropoda
- Class: Insecta
- Order: Blattodea
- Infraorder: Isoptera
- Family: Termitidae
- Subfamily: Termitinae
- Genus: Synhamitermes; Holmgren, 1912

Genus of termites

Synhamitermes is a genus of termite. Species in this genus are nocturnal. The genus has a highly abnormal distribution in India.

== Species ==
- Synhamitermes ceylonicus
- Synhamitermes colombensis
- Synhamitermes labioangulatus
- Synhamitermes quadriceps
