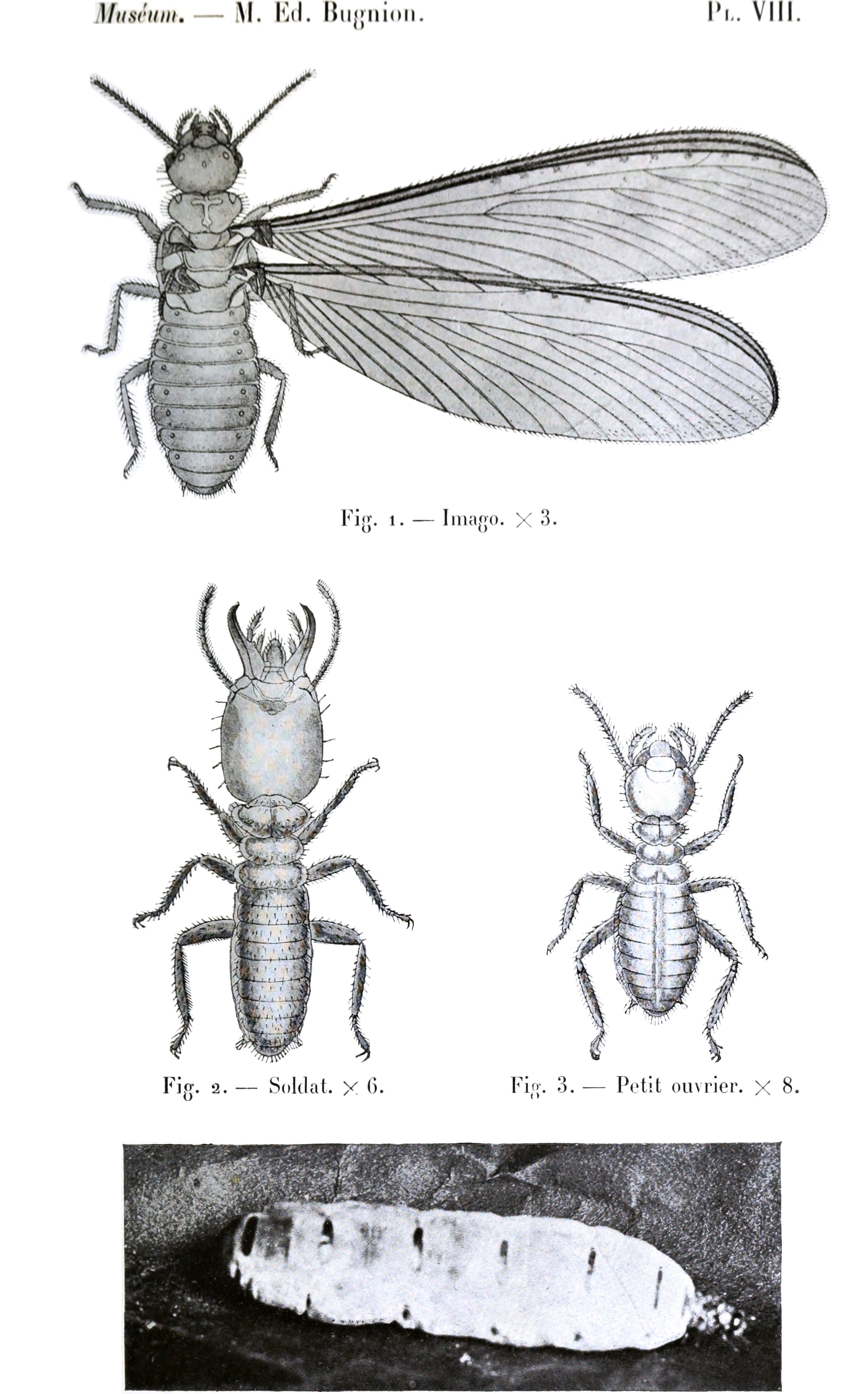
- The alate, soldier, minor worker and queen of O. horni

Scientific classification
- Kingdom: Animalia
- Phylum: Arthropoda
- Clade: Pancrustacea
- Class: Insecta
- Order: Blattodea
- Infraorder: Isoptera
- Family: Termitidae
- Subfamily: Macrotermitinae
- Genus: Odontotermes; Holmgren, 1912

= Odontotermes =

Genus of termites

Odontotermes is a termite genus belonging to subfamily Macrotermitinae (fungus-growing termites), which is native to the Old World. They are most destructive in wooden homes, and are agricultural pests in the tropics and subtropics of Africa and Asia. It is the most diverse termite genus in Africa, with 78 species recorded (as of 2002).

== Nests ==
Their underground nests form a slight mound above ground, which may be covered in grass. In large colonies, the mounds may be up to 6 m (20 ft) in diameter, and may be covered by shrubs and trees. Some species construct open chimneys or vent holes that descend into the mound. The fungal garden is enveloped by a thick layer of clay.

== Castes ==
The queen lives in a clay cell in the midst of the fungal garden at the center of the hive. The African species have a single soldier caste, unlike the related genus Macrotermes.

Alarmed soldier termites of Odontotermes badius Haviland 1898 expel an odoriferous brown defensive secretion between their mandibles that becomes sticky and rubbery on exposure to air. The secretion is a mixture of benzoquinone and protein.

== Food ==
Their only food is the fungus grown in the fungal garden at the center of the nest. The fungus is cultivated on a substrate of wood, bark, leaf litter, dry dung, and dead grass. These are plastered with cement where they are obtained, which facilitates diurnal foraging. Odontotermes species are major contributors to litter decomposition. The fungus Termitomyces reticulatus is found in association with O. badius and O. transvaalensis in Africa.

== Species ==
Species include:

- Odontotermes assmuthi Holmgren, 1913 – South Asia
- Odontotermes badius (Haviland, 1898) – Africa
- Odontotermes ceylonicus (Wasmann, 1902) – South Asia
- Odontotermes escherichi Holmgren, 1911 – South Asia
- Odontotermes feae (Wasmann, 1896) – South Asia
- Odontotermes formosanus (Shiraki) – South Asia
- Odontotermes globicola (Wasmann, 1902) – South Asia
- Odontotermes horni (Wasmann, 1902) – South Asia
- Odontotermes koenigi (Desneux, 1906) – South Asia
- Odontotermes latericius (Haviland, 1898) – Africa
- Odontotermes obesus (Rambur) – South Asia
- Odontotermes preliminaris (Holmgren, 1911) – South Asia
- Odontotermes redemanni (Wasmann, 1893) – South Asia
- Odontotermes taprobanes (Walker, 1853) – South Asia
- Odontotermes transvaalensis (Sjöstedt, 1902) – Africa
- Odontotermes wallonensis Wasmann – South Asia

== Gallery ==
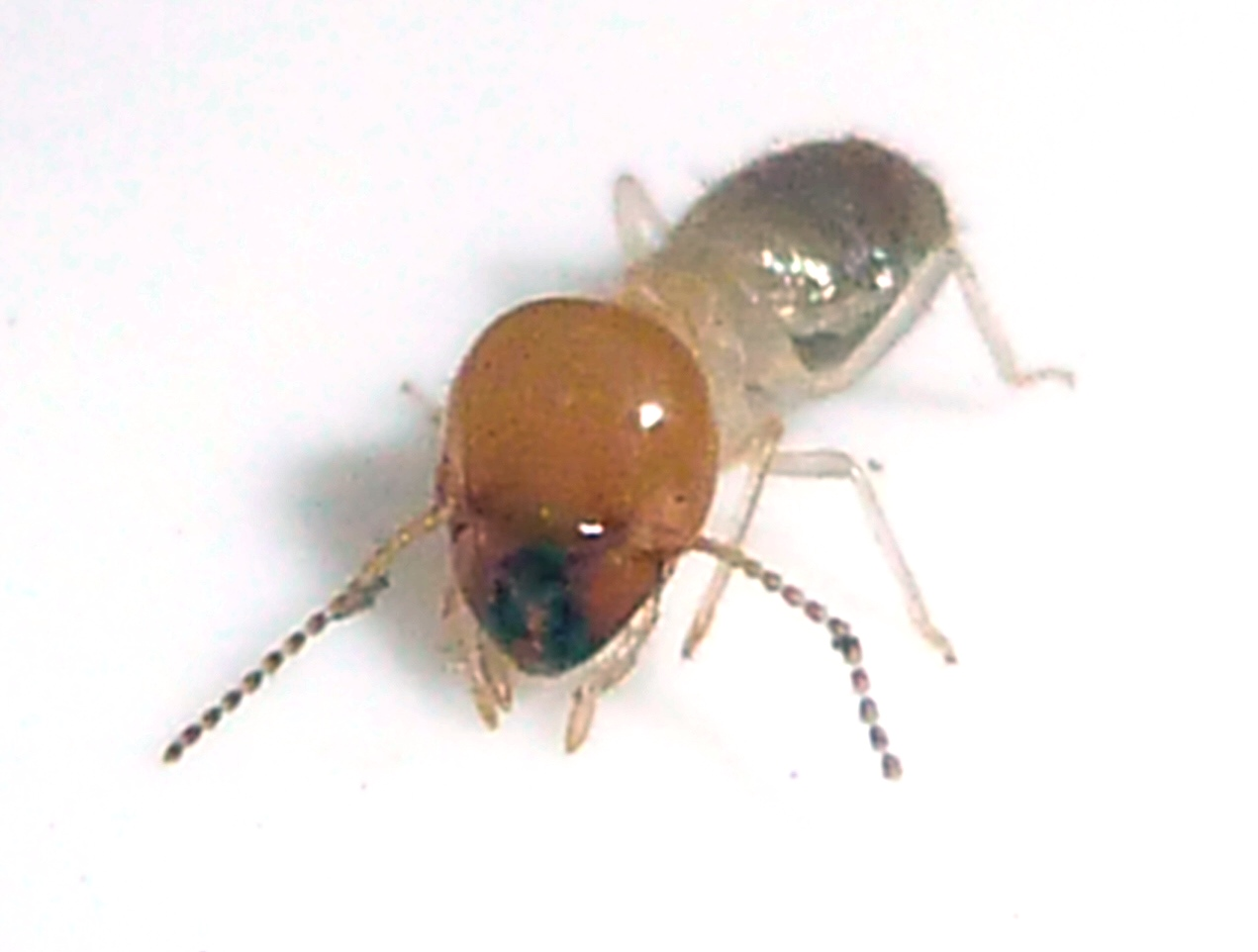
O. badius worker

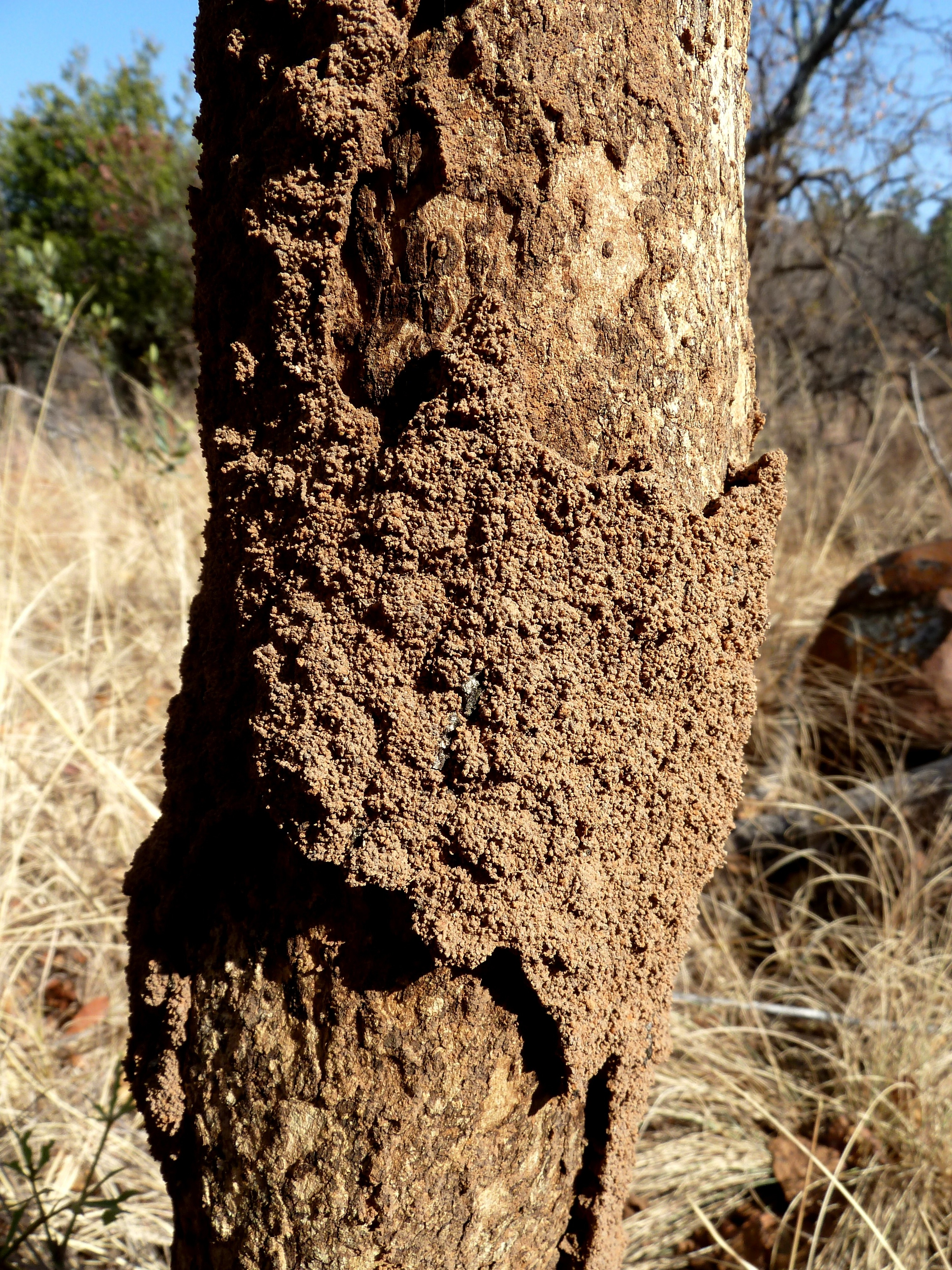
Cement plastered over tree bark

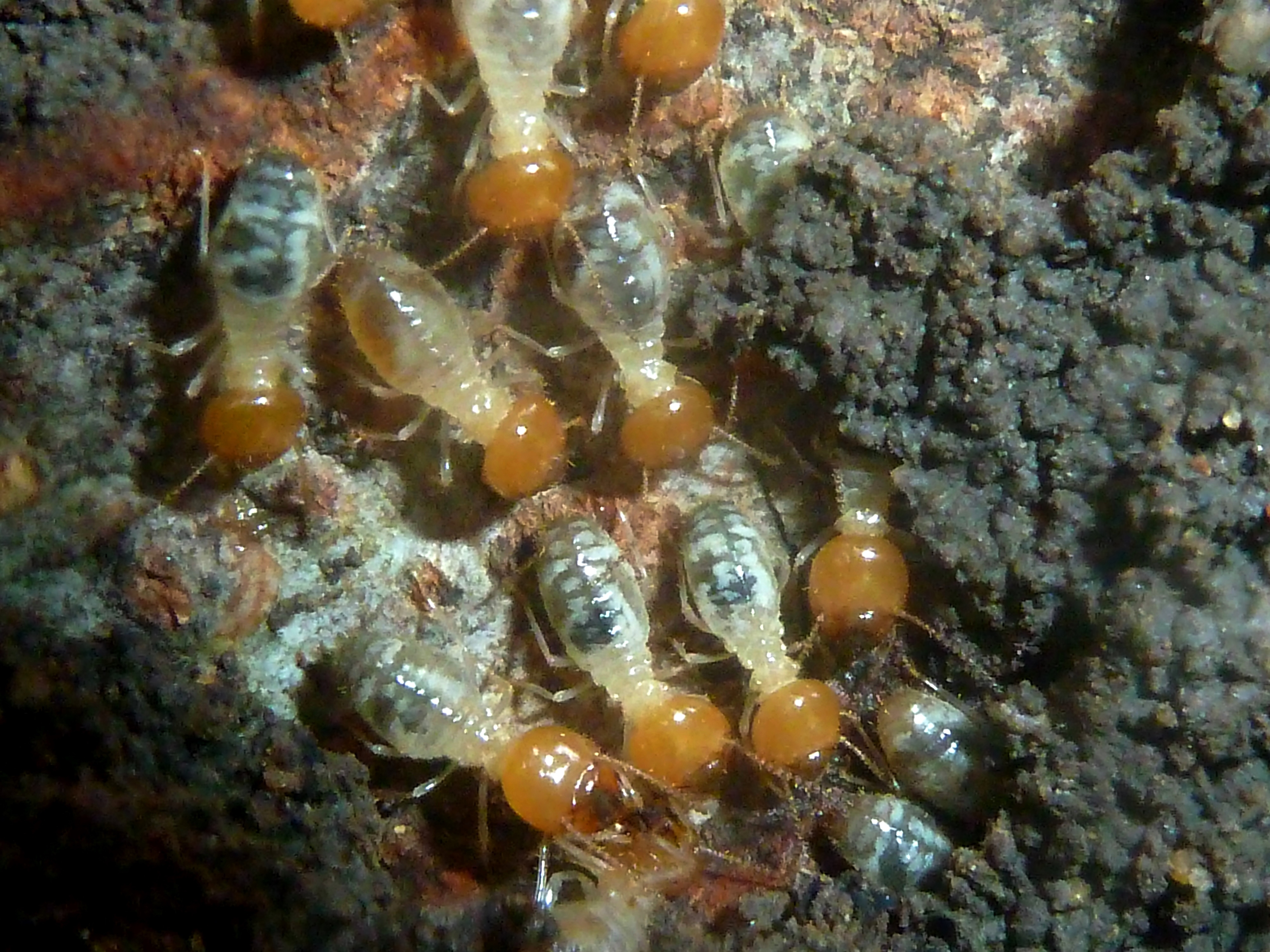
Workers foraging on tree bark under cement

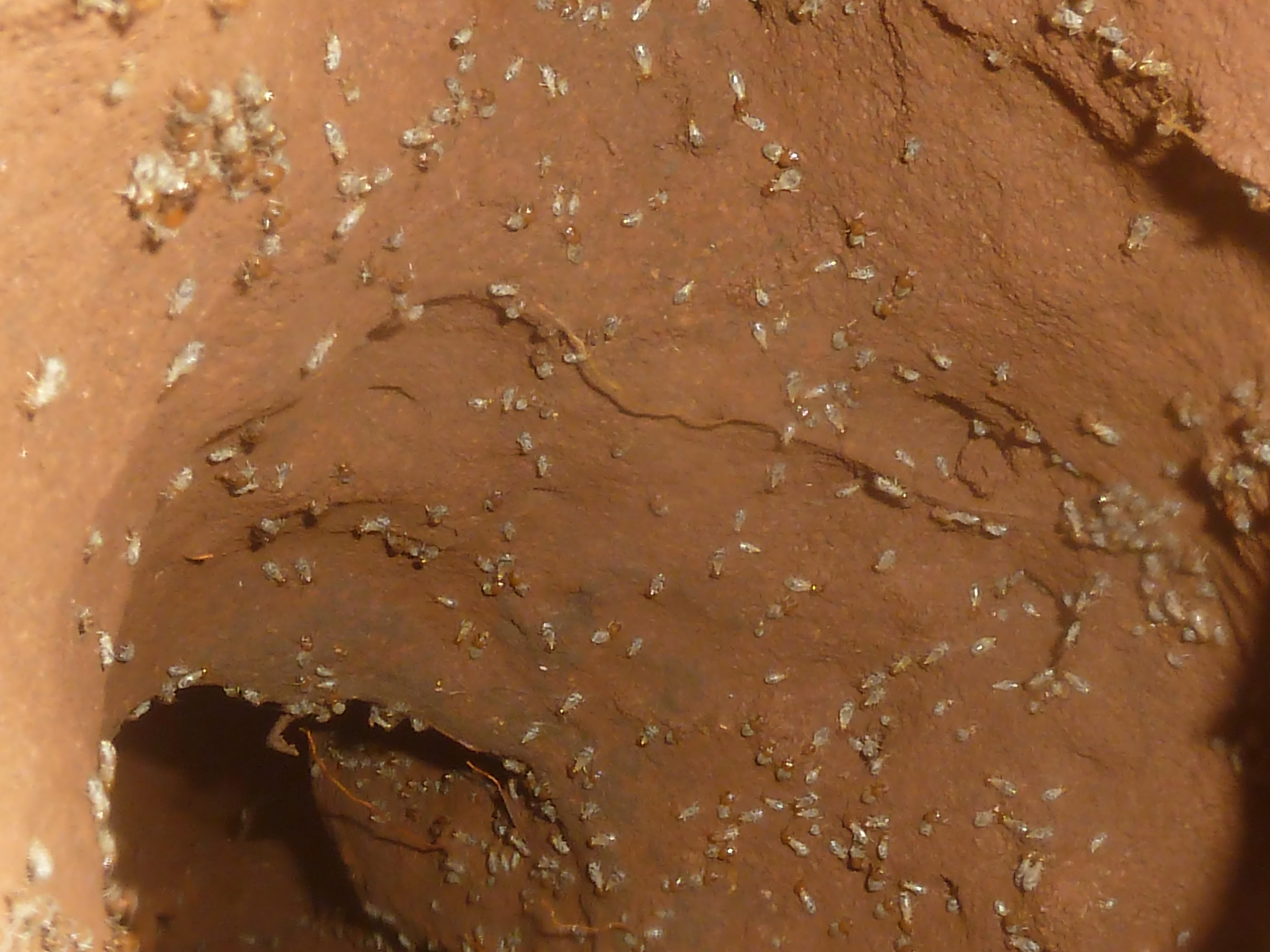
Workers in ventilation tunnel
