= Glyptotermes chiraharitae =

Scientific classification
- Kingdom: Animalia
- Phylum: Arthropoda
- Clade: Pancrustacea
- Class: Insecta
- Order: Blattodea
- Infraorder: Isoptera
- Family: Kalotermitidae
- Genus: Glyptotermes
- Species: G. chiraharitae

Binomial name
- Glyptotermes chiraharitae Amina & Rajmohana, 2016

Species of termite

Glyptotermes chiraharitae is a termite species found from Malabar Wildlife Sanctuary, Kerala, India.

It has been named Chiraharitae after the Western Ghats, where it was spotted.
