= Heterotermes ceylonicus =

Scientific classification
- Domain: Eukaryota
- Kingdom: Animalia
- Phylum: Arthropoda
- Class: Insecta
- Order: Blattodea
- Infraorder: Isoptera
- Genus: Heterotermes
- Species: H. ceylonicus

Binomial name
- Heterotermes ceylonicus (Holmgren, 1911)

Synonyms
- Leucotermes ceylonicus Holmgren, 1911

Species of termite

Heterotermes ceylonicus is a species of subterranean termite of the family Heterotermitidae. It is native to India and Sri Lanka. It is a wood destroying termites, which damage to logs, wooden structures of both natural and man-made such as tree stumps of Gravellia and Hevea brasiliensis, and tea plantations. It can be also found in mounds of Hypotermes obscuriceps.
