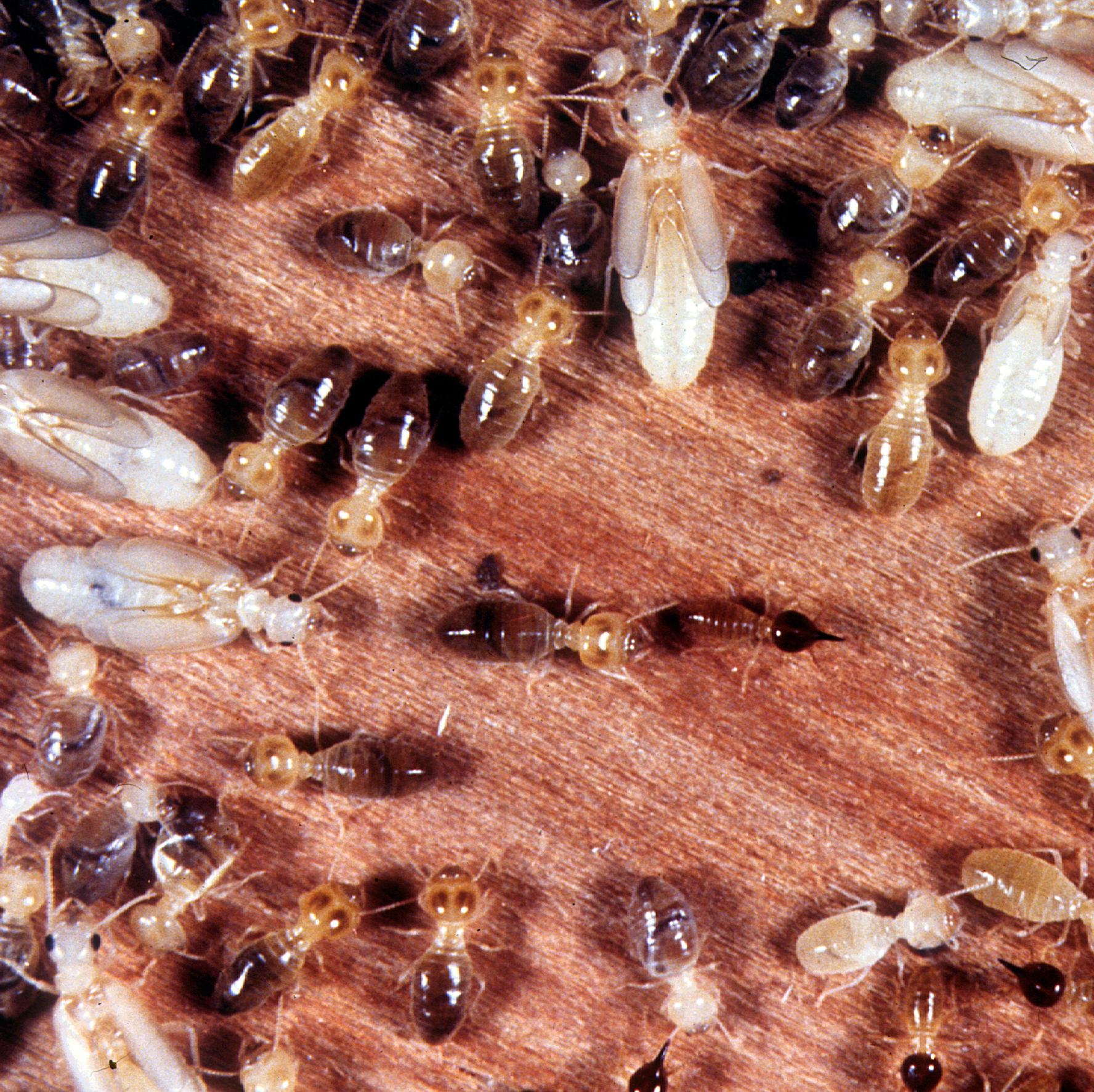
- Soldiers workers and nymphs of a colony of Nasutitermes exitiosus termites

Scientific classification
- Kingdom: Animalia
- Phylum: Arthropoda
- Class: Insecta
- Order: Blattodea
- Infraorder: Isoptera
- Family: Termitidae
- Genus: Nasutitermes
- Species: N. exitiosus

Binomial name
- Nasutitermes exitiosus (Hill, 1925)

= Nasutitermes exitiosus =

Species of termite

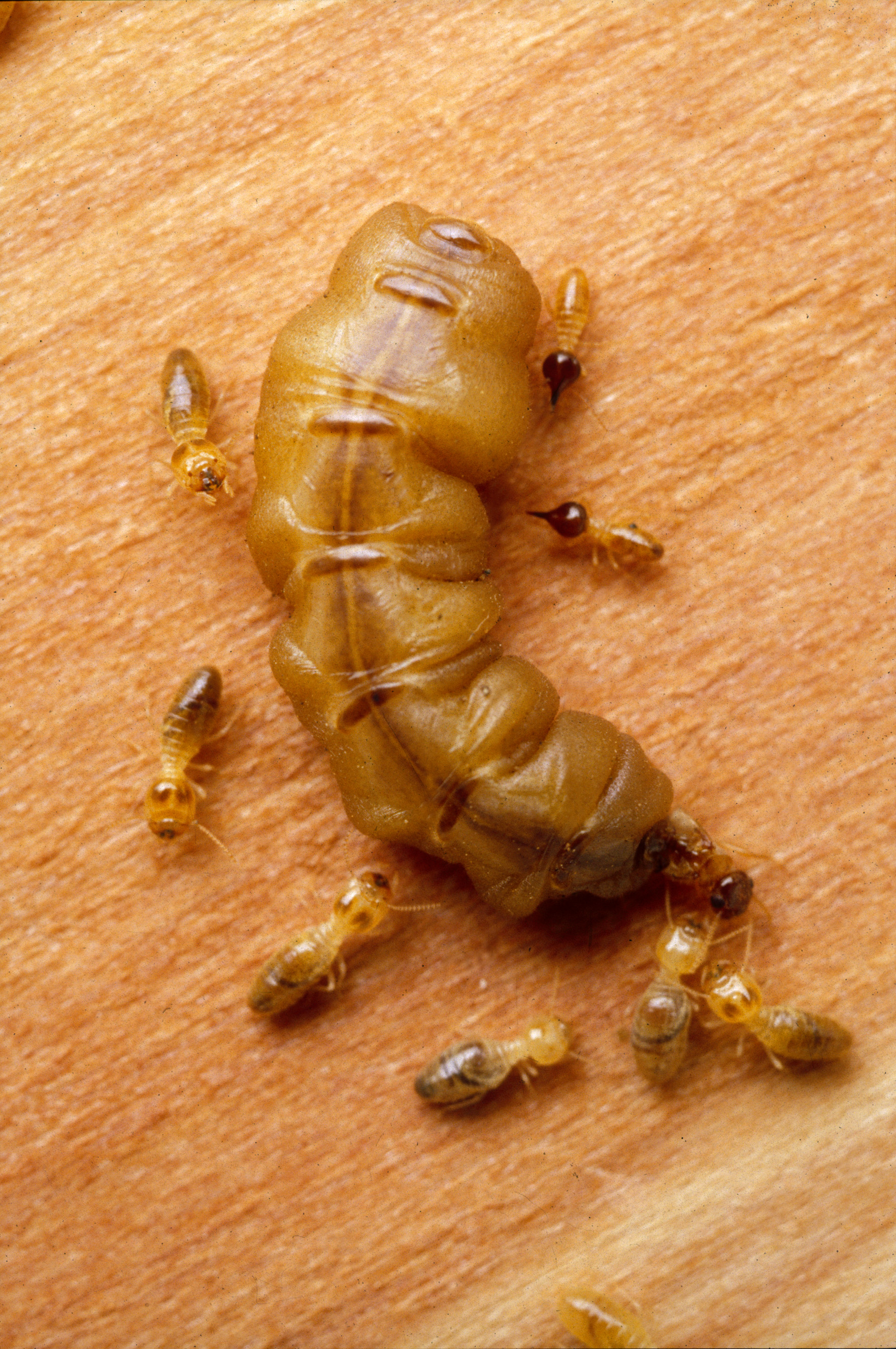
A mature queen of Nasutitermes exitiosus with workers and two soldiers

Nasutitermes is a species of snouted termite occurring in Australia. It is common in Canberra and parts of New South Wales. It nests in soil. Spores of Metarhizium robertsii have been found in their mounds.
