= Microcerotermes heimi =

Scientific classification
- Domain: Eukaryota
- Kingdom: Animalia
- Phylum: Arthropoda
- Class: Insecta
- Order: Blattodea
- Infraorder: Isoptera
- Family: Termitidae
- Genus: Microcerotermes
- Species: M. heimi

Binomial name
- Microcerotermes heimi Wasmann, 1902

Species of termite

Microcerotermes heimi, is a species of small termite of the genus Microcerotermes. It is found from Maharashtra area of India and from Sri Lanka. It can be found from forests, in dead stumps and under bark of trees.
