= Cryptotermes cynocephalus =

Indo-Malaysian drywood termite

Scientific classification
- Kingdom: Animalia
- Phylum: Arthropoda
- Clade: Pancrustacea
- Class: Insecta
- Order: Blattodea
- Infraorder: Isoptera
- Family: Kalotermitidae
- Genus: Cryptotermes
- Species: C. cynocephalus

Binomial name
- Cryptotermes cynocephalus Light, 1921

Synonyms
- Cryptotermes buitenzorgi Kemner, 1934

Species of termite

Cryptotermes cynocephalus, the Indo-Malaysian drywood termite, is a species of dry wood termite of the genus Cryptotermes. It is found in Philippines, Australia, Papua New Guinea, Hawaii, and introduced to Sri Lanka. It is the smallest termite species in Australia, with 2.5 – 3.7mm in soldiers.

== Description ==
- Imago - General body color is pale brown. Abdomen is darker than head and pronotum. Jointed appendages are creamy white.
- Soldier - On soldier's head, there is a strongly V-shaped frontal flange. Head is complete black with orange posterior. Head strongly concave in middle. Mandibles short and stout. Teeth are weak. Eyes very small and rudiment-like.

== Habitat ==
This species thrives in drywood environments and is often found in wooden structures, furniture, and dead trees. Unlike subterranean termites, Cryptotermes cynocephalus does not require contact with soil.

== Behaviour and ecology ==
Cryptotermes cynocephalus is a social insect, living in colonies that consist of workers, soldiers, and reproductive individuals. The colonies are usually found within the wood they infest, where they excavate galleries for nesting and feeding.

== Life cycle ==
The life cycle of Cryptotermes cynocephalus includes egg, nymph, and adult stages. Reproductives engage in nuptial flights to establish new colonies, which typically occurs during warm, humid conditions.

== Impact ==
The feeding preference of this species of drywood termites was found to be from most to least preferred: Falcataria moluccana, Acacia mangium, Gmelina arborea, Swietenia macrophylla, and Eucalyptus deglupta in a series of no-choice and choice feeding trials in the Philippines. These wood species are used widely for light construction, in plywood and veneer based products where termite infestations can cause severe damage.

=== Economic impact ===
Cryptotermes cynocephalus is considered a significant pest due to its ability to damage wooden structures and furniture. Infestations can result in costly repairs and replacements, making effective management and control measures essential.

== Control ==
Oleic Acid isolated from Cerbera manghas are known to have effective controlling activities against termites.
