= Odontotermes feae =

Scientific classification
- Domain: Eukaryota
- Kingdom: Animalia
- Phylum: Arthropoda
- Class: Insecta
- Order: Blattodea
- Infraorder: Isoptera
- Family: Termitidae
- Genus: Odontotermes
- Species: O. feae

Binomial name
- Odontotermes feae (Wasmann, 1896)

Synonyms
- Termes feae Wasmann, 1896; Odontotermes indicus Thakur, 1981

Species of termite

Odontotermes feae, the fungus-growing termite or South Asian wood-destroying termite, is a small species of earth dwelling termite of the genus Odontotermes. It is native to India and Sri Lanka.

== Host plants ==
It attacks many dead wood and timber trees including,

- Lagerstroemia parviflora
- Anogeissus latifolia
- Syzygium cumini
- Schleichera oleosa
- Lagerstroemia parviflora
- Senna auriculata
- Acorus calamus
- Terminalia alata
- Buchanania lanzan
