= Microtermes macronotus =

Scientific classification
- Domain: Eukaryota
- Kingdom: Animalia
- Phylum: Arthropoda
- Class: Insecta
- Order: Blattodea
- Infraorder: Isoptera
- Family: Termitidae
- Genus: Microtermes
- Species: M. macronotus

Binomial name
- Microtermes macronotus Holmgren, 1913

Species of termite

Microtermes macronotus is a small species of termite of the family Termitidae. It is native to India and Sri Lanka.
