= Ceylonitermellus hantanae =

Scientific classification
- Kingdom: Animalia
- Phylum: Arthropoda
- Clade: Pancrustacea
- Class: Insecta
- Order: Blattodea
- Infraorder: Isoptera
- Family: Termitidae
- Genus: Ceylonitermellus
- Species: C. hantanae

Binomial name
- Ceylonitermellus hantanae (Holmgren, 1911)

Synonyms
- Eutermes hantanae Holmgren, 1911

Species of termite

Ceylonitermellus hantanae is a species of termite of the genus Ceylonitermellus. It is endemic to Sri Lanka, first described from Hanthana Mountain Range area. It is a soil-dwelling and soil-feeding termite species.
