= Odontotermes escherichi =

Scientific classification
- Kingdom: Animalia
- Phylum: Arthropoda
- Class: Insecta
- Order: Blattodea
- Infraorder: Isoptera
- Family: Termitidae
- Genus: Odontotermes
- Species: O. escherichi

Binomial name
- Odontotermes escherichi Holmgren, 1911

Synonyms
- Termes escherichi Holmgren, 1911

Species of termite

Odontotermes escherichi, is a small species of termite of the genus Odontotermes. It is native to India, Sri Lanka and Peninsular Malaysia. It attacks many dead, tree stems and decaying logs.
