= Odontotermes taprobanes =

Scientific classification
- Kingdom: Animalia
- Phylum: Arthropoda
- Class: Insecta
- Order: Blattodea
- Infraorder: Isoptera
- Family: Termitidae
- Genus: Odontotermes
- Species: O. taprobanes

Binomial name
- Odontotermes taprobanes (Walker, 1853)

Synonyms
- Termes taprobanes Walker, 1853

Species of termite

Odontotermes taprobanes, is a species of termite of the genus Odontotermes. It is native to India and Sri Lanka.
