= Odontotermes redemanni =

Scientific classification
- Domain: Eukaryota
- Kingdom: Animalia
- Phylum: Arthropoda
- Class: Insecta
- Order: Blattodea
- Infraorder: Isoptera
- Family: Termitidae
- Genus: Odontotermes
- Species: O. redemanni

Binomial name
- Odontotermes redemanni (Wasmann, 1893)

Synonyms
- Termes redemanni Wasmann, 1893

Species of termite

Odontotermes redemanni, is a species of termite of the genus Odontotermes. It is native to India and Sri Lanka. It damages wooden constructions. It is a pest of sugarcane, tea and coconut. They construct termitaria during November to March when rainfall and ambient temperature become low. Underground termite nests of this species are a natural host for the important Traditional Chinese Medicine fungus Xylaria nigripes, also known as Wu Ling Shen.
