= Odontotermes assmuthi =

Sugarcane termite

Scientific classification
- Kingdom: Animalia
- Phylum: Arthropoda
- Clade: Pancrustacea
- Class: Insecta
- Order: Blattodea
- Infraorder: Isoptera
- Family: Termitidae
- Genus: Odontotermes
- Species: O. assmuthi

Binomial name
- Odontotermes assmuthi Holmgren, 1913

Synonyms
- Odontotermes (Odontotermes) assmuthi Holmgren, 1913

Species of termite

The sugarcane termite (Odontotermes assmuthi) is a species of termite of the genus Odontotermes. It is native to India and Sri Lanka. It is recorded from coconut palms and is a pest of sugarcane.

== Description ==
General body color is creamy with darker head. Workers can be seen foraging in both morning and evening.

It is a major pest of sugar cane, where attacked canes can be wilted and then dieback occurs. Semi-circular feeding marks on the leaves are characteristic marks left by the termite. Aspergillus flavus known to have termiticidal activity against O. assmuthi.
