= Odontotermes ceylonicus =

Scientific classification
- Kingdom: Animalia
- Phylum: Arthropoda
- Class: Insecta
- Order: Blattodea
- Infraorder: Isoptera
- Family: Termitidae
- Genus: Odontotermes
- Species: O. ceylonicus

Binomial name
- Odontotermes ceylonicus (Wasmann, 1902)

Synonyms
- Termes ceylonicus Wasmann, 1902; Odontotermes meturensis Roonwal & Chhotani, 1959

Species of termite

Odontotermes ceylonicus, is a species of termite of the genus Odontotermes. It is native to India and Sri Lanka. Though nests in the ground, they never construct termitaria. It attacks many dead, diseased rotten plant roots and wooden buildings. It is a major pest of sugarcane and a secondary pest of tea.
