= Nasutitermes ceylonicus =

Scientific classification
- Domain: Eukaryota
- Kingdom: Animalia
- Phylum: Arthropoda
- Class: Insecta
- Order: Blattodea
- Infraorder: Isoptera
- Family: Termitidae
- Genus: Nasutitermes
- Species: N. ceylonicus

Binomial name
- Nasutitermes ceylonicus Holmgren, 1911

Synonyms
- Eutermes ceylonicus Holmgren, 1911

Species of termite

Nasutitermes ceylonicus, is a species of termite of the genus Nasutitermes. It is found in Sri Lanka. It is a pest of tea and coconut. It damages numerous wooden constructions, and timber in buildings.
