= Nasutitermes horni =

Scientific classification
- Domain: Eukaryota
- Kingdom: Animalia
- Phylum: Arthropoda
- Class: Insecta
- Order: Blattodea
- Infraorder: Isoptera
- Family: Termitidae
- Genus: Nasutitermes
- Species: N. horni

Binomial name
- Nasutitermes horni (Wasmnan, 1902)

Synonyms
- Eutermes inanis horni Wasmann, 1902

Species of termite

Nasutitermes horni, is a species of termite of the genus Nasutitermes. It is found in Sri Lanka. It is not considered as a pest, although they are abundant in coconut plantations and forests.
