= Microcerotermes minor =

Scientific classification
- Kingdom: Animalia
- Phylum: Arthropoda
- Class: Insecta
- Order: Blattodea
- Infraorder: Isoptera
- Family: Termitidae
- Genus: Microcerotermes
- Species: M. minor

Binomial name
- Microcerotermes minor Holmgren, 1914

Species of termite

Microcerotermes minor, is a species of small termite of the genus Microcerotermes. It is found from Maha Iluppalama area of Sri Lanka.
