= Microcerotermes greeni =

Scientific classification
- Domain: Eukaryota
- Kingdom: Animalia
- Phylum: Arthropoda
- Class: Insecta
- Order: Blattodea
- Infraorder: Isoptera
- Family: Termitidae
- Genus: Microcerotermes
- Species: M. greeni

Binomial name
- Microcerotermes greeni Holmgren, 1913

Species of termite

Microcerotermes greeni, is a species of small termite of the genus Microcerotermes. It is found from Ambalangoda area of Sri Lanka. It is a secondary pest of tea.
