= Dicuspiditermes nemorosus =

Scientific classification
- Domain: Eukaryota
- Kingdom: Animalia
- Phylum: Arthropoda
- Class: Insecta
- Order: Blattodea
- Infraorder: Isoptera
- Family: Termitidae
- Genus: Dicuspiditermes
- Species: D. nemorosus

Binomial name
- Dicuspiditermes nemorosus (Haviland, 1898)

Synonyms
- Termes nemorosus Haviland, 1898; Capritermes medius Holmgren, 1913; Capritermes minor Holmgren, 1913; Dicuspiditermes paramakhamensis Thapa, 1982

Species of termite

Dicuspiditermes nemorosus, is a species of small termite of the genus Dicuspiditermes. It is found in Sri Lanka, India, Malaysia and Borneo. The species is known to build three different types of mounding nests, where two termitaria have single protruding nest structure and third nest type is typified by several protruding nest all connected at the base.
