= Termitogeton umbilicatus =

Scientific classification
- Domain: Eukaryota
- Kingdom: Animalia
- Phylum: Arthropoda
- Class: Insecta
- Order: Blattodea
- Infraorder: Isoptera
- Family: Rhinotermitidae
- Genus: Termitogeton
- Species: T. umbilicatus

Binomial name
- Termitogeton umbilicatus (Hagen, 1858)

Synonyms
- Termitogeton umbilicatus Hagen, 1858

Species of termite

Termitogeton umbilicatus, is a species of subterranean termite of the genus Termitogeton. It is endemic to Sri Lanka and can be seen in forests, plains, hills and human vegetation of higher elevations.
