= Dicuspiditermes hutsoni =

Scientific classification
- Kingdom: Animalia
- Phylum: Arthropoda
- Class: Insecta
- Order: Blattodea
- Infraorder: Isoptera
- Family: Termitidae
- Genus: Dicuspiditermes
- Species: D. hutsoni

Binomial name
- Dicuspiditermes hutsoni (Kemner, 1926)

Synonyms
- Capritermes hutsoni Kemner 1926

Species of termite

Dicuspiditermes hutsoni, is a species of small termite of the genus Dicuspiditermes. It is found from Palmadulla area of Sri Lanka.
