= Cryptotermes bengalensis =

Scientific classification
- Kingdom: Animalia
- Phylum: Arthropoda
- Class: Insecta
- Order: Blattodea
- Infraorder: Isoptera
- Family: Kalotermitidae
- Genus: Cryptotermes
- Species: C. bengalensis

Binomial name
- Cryptotermes bengalensis (Snyder, 1934)

Synonyms
- Calotermes (Cryptotermes) brachygnathus Jepson, 1931, nomen nudum; Calotermes (Cryptotermes) ceylonicus Jepson, 1931, nomen nudum; Kalotermes (Cryptotermes) bengalensis Snyder, 1934; Cryptotermes angulatus Pinto, 1941, nomen nudum

Species of termite

Cryptotermes bengalensis, is a species of dry wood termite of the genus Cryptotermes. It is native to India, Bangladesh, Thailand and introduced to Sri Lanka. It is found in dead and rotten wood of Ficus species. It is a pest of Diospyros insignis.
