= Synhamitermes colombensis =

Scientific classification
- Domain: Eukaryota
- Kingdom: Animalia
- Phylum: Arthropoda
- Class: Insecta
- Order: Blattodea
- Infraorder: Isoptera
- Family: Termitidae
- Genus: Synhamitermes
- Species: S. colombensis

Binomial name
- Synhamitermes colombensis Roonwal & Sen-Sarma, 1960

Synonyms
- Synhamitermes colombensis Roonwal & Sen-Sarma, 1960

Species of termite

Synhamitermes colombensis, is a species of termite of the genus Synhamitermes. It is point endemic to Colombo region of Sri Lanka.
