= Speculitermes sinhalensis =

Scientific classification
- Domain: Eukaryota
- Kingdom: Animalia
- Phylum: Arthropoda
- Class: Insecta
- Order: Blattodea
- Infraorder: Isoptera
- Family: Termitidae
- Genus: Speculitermes
- Species: S. sinhalensis

Binomial name
- Speculitermes sinhalensis Roonwal & Sen-Sarma, 1960

Synonyms
- Speculitermes cyclops sinhalensis Roonwal & Sen-Sarma, 1960

Species of termite

Speculitermes sinhalensis, is a species of termite of the genus Speculitermes. It is native to India and Sri Lanka. It was first found from Vavuniya. They are typical subterranean soil humus feeding termites, which can be found under logs, decaying trees, rocks.
