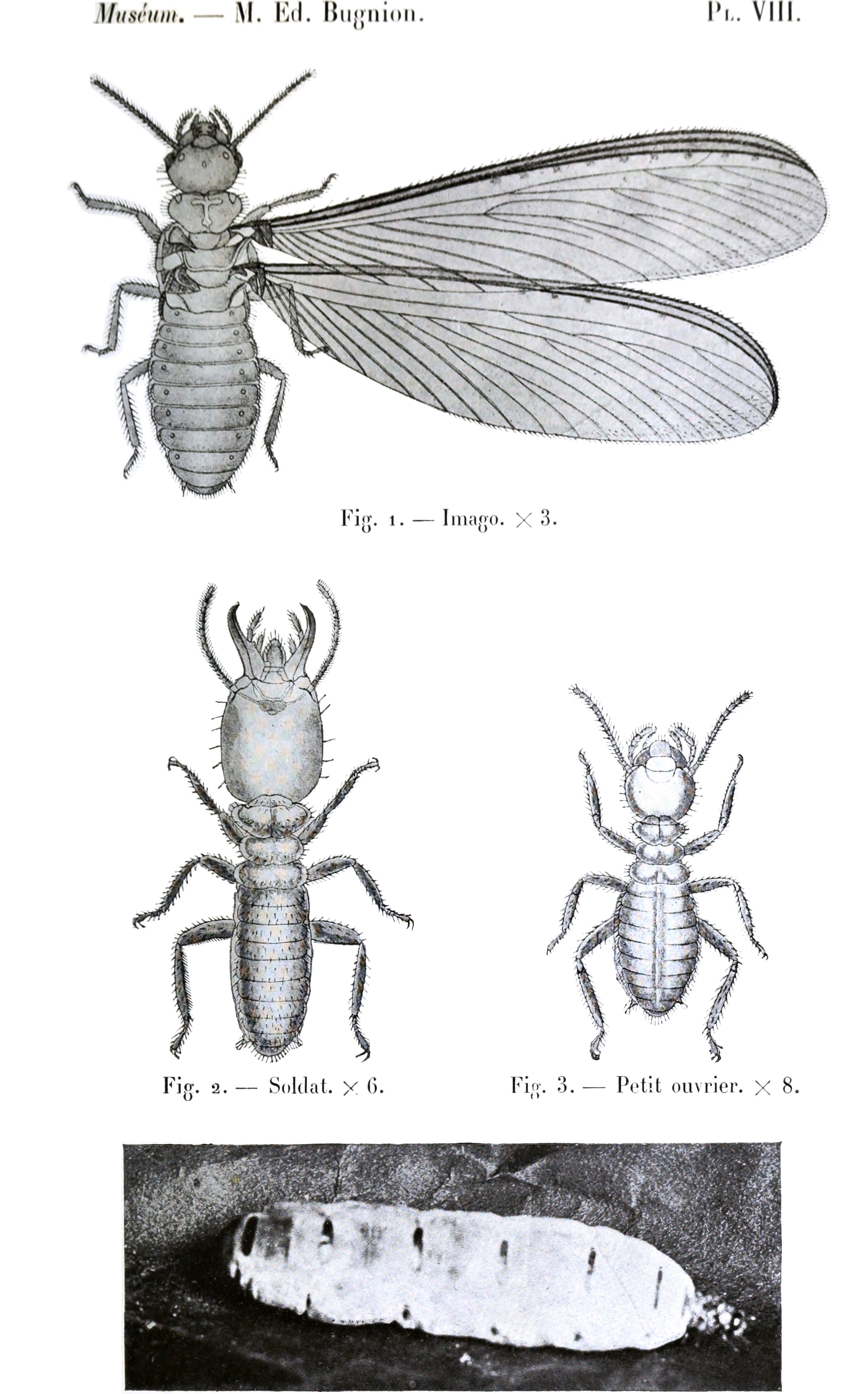

Scientific classification
- Kingdom: Animalia
- Phylum: Arthropoda
- Class: Insecta
- Order: Blattodea
- Infraorder: Isoptera
- Family: Termitidae
- Genus: Odontotermes
- Species: O. horni

Binomial name
- Odontotermes horni (Wasmann, 1902)

Synonyms
- Termes horni Wasmann 1902; Termes peradeniyae Holmgren, 1911; Odontotermes horni hutsoni Kemner, 1926; Odontotermes horni minor Kemner, 1926

= Odontotermes horni =

Species of termite

Odontotermes horni, is a species of termite of the genus Odontotermes. It is native to India and Sri Lanka. It attacks many dead, decaying trees and fertilized soil. Though nests on ground, they do not construct a termitaria. It is a pest of tea, coconut and sugarcane.
