= Synhamitermes ceylonicus =

Scientific classification
- Domain: Eukaryota
- Kingdom: Animalia
- Phylum: Arthropoda
- Class: Insecta
- Order: Blattodea
- Infraorder: Isoptera
- Family: Termitidae
- Genus: Synhamitermes
- Species: S. ceylonicus

Binomial name
- Synhamitermes ceylonicus Holmgren, 1913

Synonyms
- Hamitermes (Synhamitermes) ceylonicus Holmgren, 1913

Species of termite

Synhamitermes ceylonicus, is a species of termite of the genus Synhamitermes. It is native to Sri Lanka.
