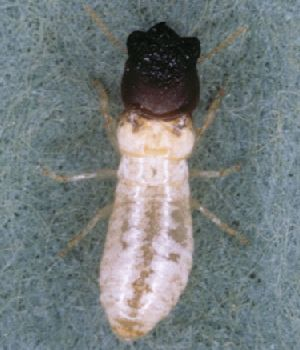
- Cryptotermes brevis

Scientific classification
- Kingdom: Animalia
- Phylum: Arthropoda
- Class: Insecta
- Order: Blattodea
- Infraorder: Isoptera
- Family: Kalotermitidae
- Genus: Cryptotermes; Banks, 1906

Species
- About 70, see text

= Cryptotermes =

Genus of termites

Cryptotermes is a genus of termites in the family Kalotermitidae. It is one of the economically most significant genera of drywood termites.

== Species ==
There are about 70 species. Species include:

- Cryptotermes abruptus Scheffrahn and Krecek, 1998
- Cryptotermes bengalensis (Snyder, 1934)
- Cryptotermes brevis (Walker, 1853)
- Cryptotermes cavifrons Banks, 1906
- Cryptotermes ceylonicus Ranaweera, 1962
- Cryptotermes colombianus Casalla et al., 2016
- Cryptotermes cynocephalus Light, 1921
- Cryptotermes domesticus Haviland, 1898
- Cryptotermes dudleyi Banks, 1918
- Cryptotermes fatulus (Light, 1935)
- Cryptotermes havilandi (Sjostedt, 1900)
- Cryptotermes longicollis Banks, 1918
- Cryptotermes mobydicki Scheffrahn RH et al., 2025
- Cryptotermes perforans Kemner, 1932
