= Glyptotermes ceylonicus =

Scientific classification
- Kingdom: Animalia
- Phylum: Arthropoda
- Class: Insecta
- Order: Blattodea
- Infraorder: Isoptera
- Family: Kalotermitidae
- Genus: Glyptotermes
- Species: G. ceylonicus

Binomial name
- Glyptotermes ceylonicus Holmgren, 1911

Synonyms
- Calotermes {Glyptotermes) ceylonicus Holmgren, 1911; Calotermes (Glyptotermes) ceylonicus cylindricus Jepson, 1931 nomen nudum

Species of termite

Glyptotermes ceylonicus, is a species of damp wood termite of the genus Glyptotermes. It is endemic to high elevations Sri Lanka. It is a pest of dead and decaying wood of Hevea, Theobroma, Ficus, and Acacia species.
