= Nasutitermes oculatus =

Scientific classification
- Domain: Eukaryota
- Kingdom: Animalia
- Phylum: Arthropoda
- Class: Insecta
- Order: Blattodea
- Infraorder: Isoptera
- Family: Termitidae
- Genus: Nasutitermes
- Species: N. oculatus

Binomial name
- Nasutitermes oculatus Holmgren, 1911

Synonyms
- Eutermes oculatus Holmgren, 1911; Eutermes longicornis Holmgren, 1913

Species of termite

Nasutitermes oculatus, is a species of termite of the genus Nasutitermes. It is found in India and Sri Lanka. It lives within the stems of Dendrocalamus giganteus.
