= Hypotermes winifredi =

Scientific classification
- Kingdom: Animalia
- Phylum: Arthropoda
- Clade: Pancrustacea
- Class: Insecta
- Order: Blattodea
- Infraorder: Isoptera
- Family: Termitidae
- Genus: Hypotermes
- Species: H. winifredi

Binomial name
- Hypotermes winifredi (Ahmad, 1953)

Synonyms
- Odontotermes (Hypotermes) winifredi Ahmad, 1953

Species of termite

Hypotermes winifredi, is a species of termite of the genus Hypotermes. It is native to India and Sri Lanka.
