= Pericapritermes speciosus =

Scientific classification
- Domain: Eukaryota
- Kingdom: Animalia
- Phylum: Arthropoda
- Class: Insecta
- Order: Blattodea
- Infraorder: Isoptera
- Family: Termitidae
- Genus: Pericapritermes
- Species: P. speciosus

Binomial name
- Pericapritermes speciosus (Haviland, 1898)

Synonyms
- Termes speciosus Haviland, 1898

Species of termite

Pericapritermes speciosus, is a species of small termite of the genus Pericapritermes. It is found in Sri Lanka and Borneo.
