= Cryptotermes ceylonicus =

Scientific classification
- Kingdom: Animalia
- Phylum: Arthropoda
- Class: Insecta
- Order: Blattodea
- Infraorder: Isoptera
- Family: Kalotermitidae
- Genus: Cryptotermes
- Species: C. ceylonicus

Binomial name
- Cryptotermes ceylonicus Ranaweera, 1962

Species of termite

Cryptotermes ceylonicus, is a species of dry wood termite of the genus Cryptotermes. It is found in Sri Lanka. It is found in living wood, and other man-made wooden constructions. They possess teeth-less mandibles.
