= Odontotermes koenigi =

Scientific classification
- Kingdom: Animalia
- Phylum: Arthropoda
- Class: Insecta
- Order: Blattodea
- Infraorder: Isoptera
- Family: Termitidae
- Genus: Odontotermes
- Species: O. koenigi

Binomial name
- Odontotermes koenigi (Desneux, 1906)

Synonyms
- Termes koenigi Desneux, 1906

Species of termite

Odontotermes koenigi, is a species of termite of the genus Odontotermes. It is native to India and Sri Lanka. It is a pest of tea.
