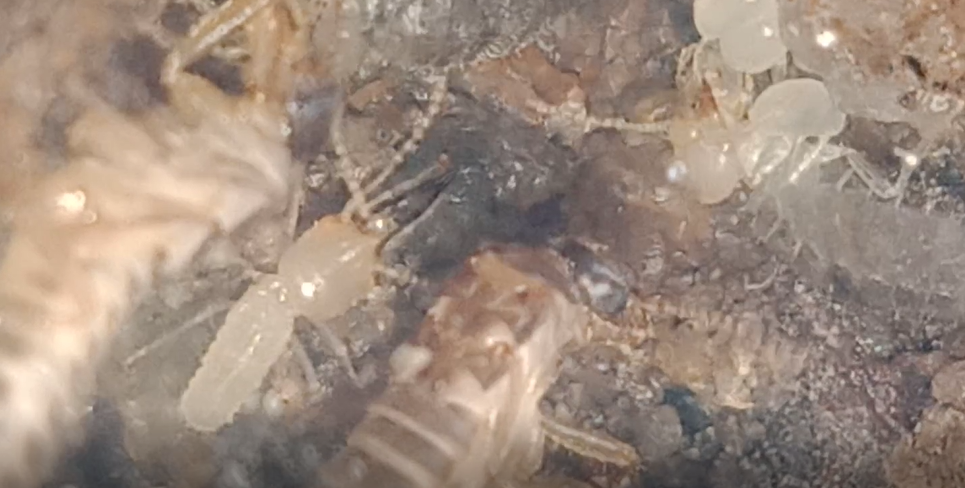
- Soldier of Angulitermes ceylonicus

Scientific classification
- Domain: Eukaryota
- Kingdom: Animalia
- Phylum: Arthropoda
- Class: Insecta
- Order: Blattodea
- Infraorder: Isoptera
- Family: Termitidae
- Genus: Angulitermes
- Species: A. ceylonicus

Binomial name
- Angulitermes ceylonicus (Holmgren, 1914)

Synonyms
- Mirotermes (Mirotermes) ceylonicus Holmgren 1914; Termes lighti Snyder, 1949

= Angulitermes ceylonicus =

Species of termite

Angulitermes ceylonicus, is a species of small termite of the genus Angulitermes. It is found from Maha Iluppalama area of Sri Lanka. Angulitermes ceylonicus has also been found from Nagoda, Kandana of Sri Lanka.
