= Odontotermes preliminaris =

Scientific classification
- Kingdom: Animalia
- Phylum: Arthropoda
- Clade: Pancrustacea
- Class: Insecta
- Order: Blattodea
- Infraorder: Isoptera
- Family: Termitidae
- Genus: Odontotermes
- Species: O. preliminaris

Binomial name
- Odontotermes preliminaris (Holmgren, 1911)

Synonyms
- Termes preliminaris Holmgren, 1911

Species of termite

Odontotermes preliminaris, is a species of termite of the genus Odontotermes. It is native to India and Sri Lanka.
