= Glyptotermes minutus =

Scientific classification
- Domain: Eukaryota
- Kingdom: Animalia
- Phylum: Arthropoda
- Class: Insecta
- Order: Blattodea
- Infraorder: Isoptera
- Family: Kalotermitidae
- Genus: Glyptotermes
- Species: G. minutus

Binomial name
- Glyptotermes minutus Kemner, 1932

Species of termite

Glyptotermes minutus, is a species of damp wood termite of the genus Glyptotermes. It is found in Sri Lanka. It is a pest of dead wood of Albizia saman and dead wood of Cupressus knightiana.
