= Microcerotermes bugnioni =

Scientific classification
- Domain: Eukaryota
- Kingdom: Animalia
- Phylum: Arthropoda
- Class: Insecta
- Order: Blattodea
- Infraorder: Isoptera
- Family: Termitidae
- Genus: Microcerotermes
- Species: M. bugnioni

Binomial name
- Microcerotermes bugnioni Holmgren, 1911

Synonyms
- Microcerotermes bugnioni Holmgren, 1911

Species of termite

Microcerotermes bugnioni, is a species of small termite of the genus Microcerotermes. It is found from Seenigoda Estate of Sri Lanka. It can be found under logs and in hollow stems of coconut palms.
