= Cryptotermes perforans =

Scientific classification
- Domain: Eukaryota
- Kingdom: Animalia
- Phylum: Arthropoda
- Class: Insecta
- Order: Blattodea
- Infraorder: Isoptera
- Family: Kalotermitidae
- Genus: Cryptotermes
- Species: C. perforans

Binomial name
- Cryptotermes perforans Kemner, 1932

Species of termite

Cryptotermes perforans is a species of dry wood termite of the genus Cryptotermes. It is endemic to Sri Lanka. It is found in dead wood of Syzygium cumini, attack on other dressed timber and wooden furniture.
