= Cryptotermes domesticus =

Domestic drywood termite

Scientific classification
- Domain: Eukaryota
- Kingdom: Animalia
- Phylum: Arthropoda
- Class: Insecta
- Order: Blattodea
- Infraorder: Isoptera
- Family: Kalotermitidae
- Genus: Cryptotermes
- Species: C. domesticus

Binomial name
- Cryptotermes domesticus (Haviland, 1898)

Synonyms
- Calotermes domesticus Haviland & Sharp, 1896, nomen nudum; Calotermes domesticus Haviland, 1898; Calotermes (Cryptotermes) formosae Holmgren, 1912; Calotermes kotoensis Oshima, 1912; Calotermes (Cryptotermes) ogasawaraensis Oshima, 1913; Calotermes (Cryptotermes) dentatus Oshima, 1914; Cryptotermes campbelli Light,1924; Cryptotermes hermsi Kirby, 1925; Calotermes (Cryptotermes) buxtoni Hill, 1926; Kalotermes (Cryptotermes) breviarticulatus Snyder, 1926; Calotermes (Cryptotermes) gulosus Hill, 1927; Calotermes (Cryptotermes) repentinus Hill, 1927; Calotermes (Cryptotermes) torresi Hill, 1927; Calotermes (Cryptotermes) lignarius Jepson, 1931, nomen nudum; Calotermes (Cryptotermes) tectus Jepson, 1931, nomen nudum

Species of termite

The domestic drywood termite, (Cryptotermes domesticus), is a species of dry wood termite of the genus Cryptotermes. It is native to Malaysia, Borneo, Australia, China and Sri Lanka. It is mainly a house termite and also found in cultivated areas. The presence of this termite can be identified by small heaps of tiny egg-like pellets of excreta. It is a larger termite species, with 3.25-5.90mm in soldiers. It is considered as a minor pest in Australia, but is a serious pest causing wood damage in other parts of the world.

== Description ==
- Imago - General body color is pale yellowish brown. Head is paler than other parts. Wings hyaline or faintly tinged with brown. Eyes comparatively large and distinct. Antennae composed of 15-16 segments. Head and pronotum with mild hairs.
- Soldier - Head color varies from very dark brown to black. Head capsule is glabrous. Well developed genal horns present. Antennae composed of 9-15 segments.
