= Odontotermes globicola =

Scientific classification
- Kingdom: Animalia
- Phylum: Arthropoda
- Class: Insecta
- Order: Blattodea
- Infraorder: Isoptera
- Family: Termitidae
- Genus: Odontotermes
- Species: O. globicola

Binomial name
- Odontotermes globicola (Wasmann, 1902)

Synonyms
- Microtermes globicola Wasmann, 1902; Termes (Termes) dehraduni Snyder, 1933; Odontotermes roonwali Bose, 1975

Species of termite

Odontotermes globicola is a species of small termite of the genus Odontotermes. It is native to India, Malaysia and Sri Lanka. It is found under flower pots and decaying logs. They construct small chambered nest with spherical combed termitaria.
