= Ceylonitermellus kotuae =

Scientific classification
- Kingdom: Animalia
- Phylum: Arthropoda
- Clade: Pancrustacea
- Class: Insecta
- Order: Blattodea
- Infraorder: Isoptera
- Family: Termitidae
- Genus: Ceylonitermellus
- Species: C. kotuae

Binomial name
- Ceylonitermellus kotuae Bugnion, 1914

Synonyms
- Eutermes kotuae Bugnion, 1914

Species of termite

Ceylonitermellus kotuae, is a species of termite of the genus Ceylonitermellus. It is endemic to Sri Lanka, first described from Kotuwa area of Galle. It is a soil-dwelling and soil-feeding termite species.
