= Nasutitermes lacustris =

Scientific classification
- Domain: Eukaryota
- Kingdom: Animalia
- Phylum: Arthropoda
- Class: Insecta
- Order: Blattodea
- Infraorder: Isoptera
- Family: Termitidae
- Genus: Nasutitermes
- Species: N. lacustris

Binomial name
- Nasutitermes lacustris (Bugnion, 1912)

Synonyms
- Eutermes (Eutermes) greeni Holmgren, 1912,nomen nudum; Eutermes lacustris Bugnion, 1912

Species of termite

Nasutitermes lacustris, is a species of termite of the genus Nasutitermes. It is found in India and Sri Lanka. This species builds nests on branches of forest trees and can be found in stems of trees like Anacardium, Hevea and Elaeocarpus.
