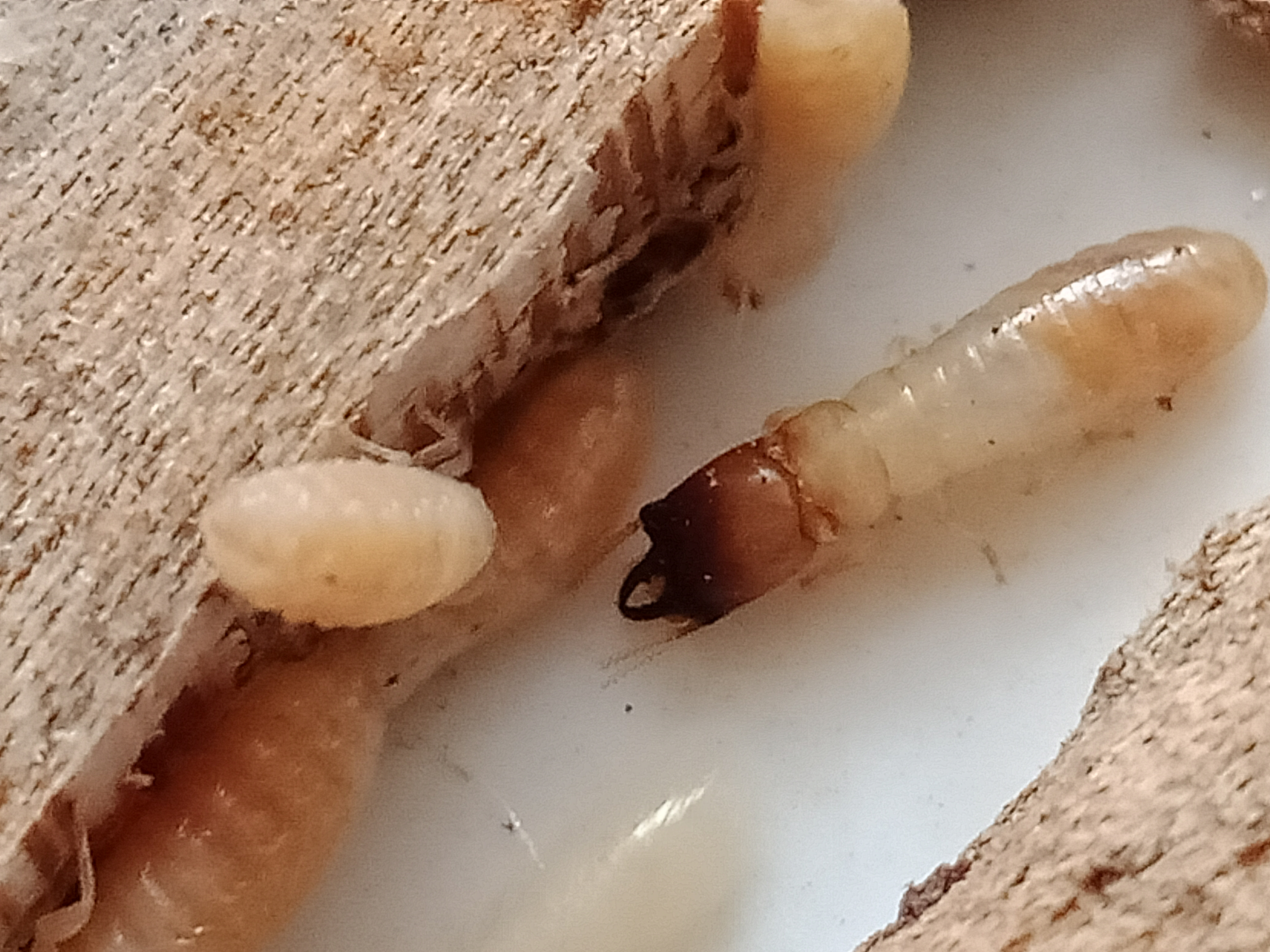

Scientific classification
- Domain: Eukaryota
- Kingdom: Animalia
- Phylum: Arthropoda
- Class: Insecta
- Order: Blattodea
- Infraorder: Isoptera
- Family: Kalotermitidae
- Genus: Cryptotermes
- Species: C. dudleyi

Binomial name
- Cryptotermes dudleyi Banks, 1918

Synonyms
- Calotermes (Cryptotermes) jacobsoni Holmgren, 1913 Name suppressed by ICZN 2004 Opinion 2064 (Case 3181); Cryptotermes dudleyi Banks, 1918; Planocryptotermes nocens Light, 1921; Cryptotermes thompsonae Snyder, 1922; Cryptotermes (Planocryptotermes) primus Kemner, 1932; Cryptotermes (Planocryptotermes) javanicus Kemner, 1934; Cryptotermes melloi Chhotani, 1970 nomen nudum

= Cryptotermes dudleyi =

West Indian drywood termite

Species of termite

The West Indian drywood termite (Cryptotermes dudleyi) is a species of dry wood termite of the genus Cryptotermes. It is native to Java, Indonesia and exotic to Australia, Trinidad and Tobago and Sri Lanka. It is predominantly a house termite found in natural and man-made wooden structures. Thus, this is the most commonest and most devastating drywood pest termite found in the world. It is a larger termite species, with 4.55–7.15 millimetres (3/16–9/32 in) length in soldiers.

== Description ==
- Imago - General body color is tawny brown. Wings are faintly tinged with brown. Sub-triangular eyes are prominent and large. Antennae composed of 15-18 segments.
- Soldier - Head yellowish brown. Antennae are pale yellow-brown in color. Prominent genal horns.

== Castes ==
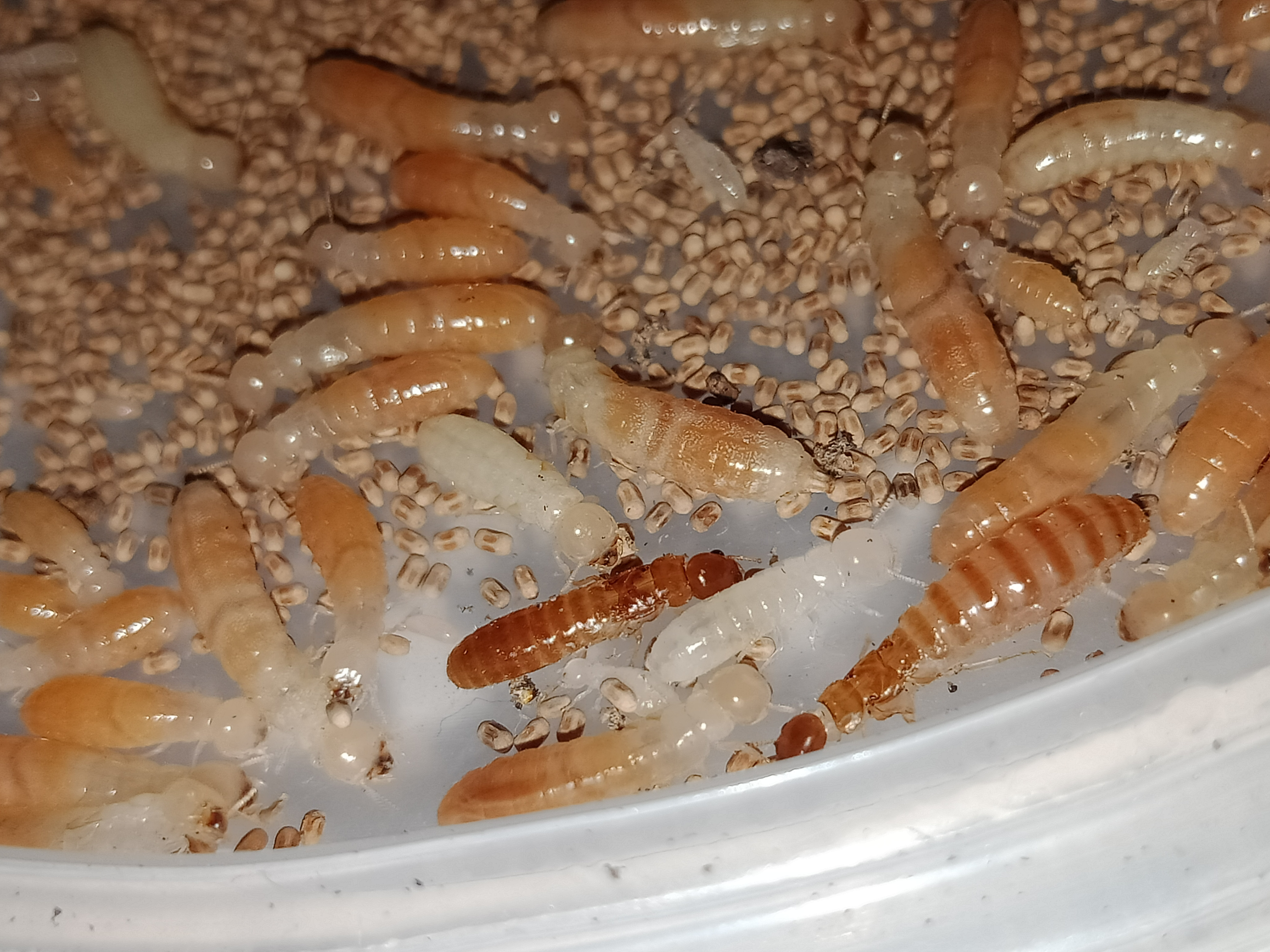
Primary Reproductives

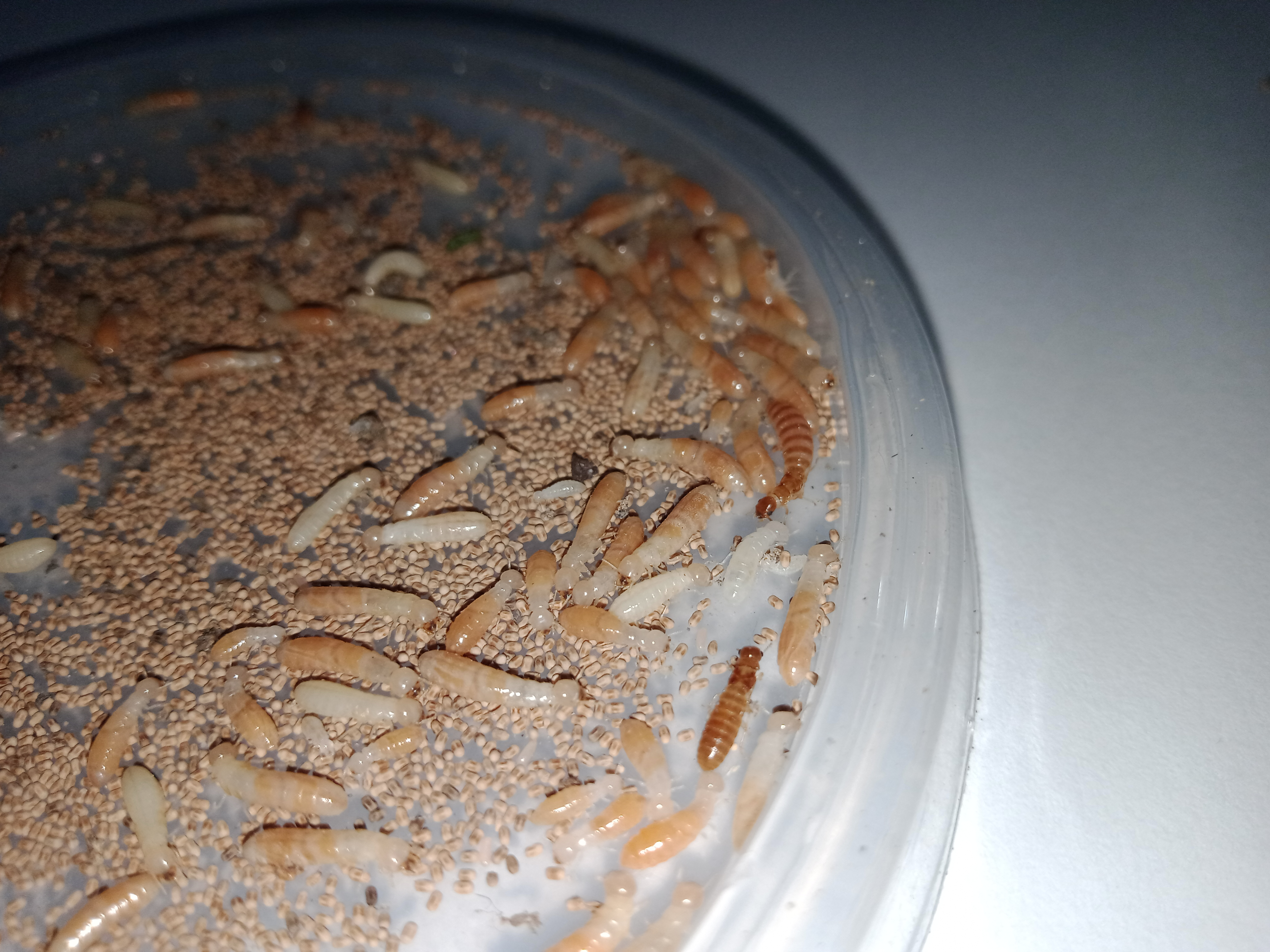
Workers/Pseudergates

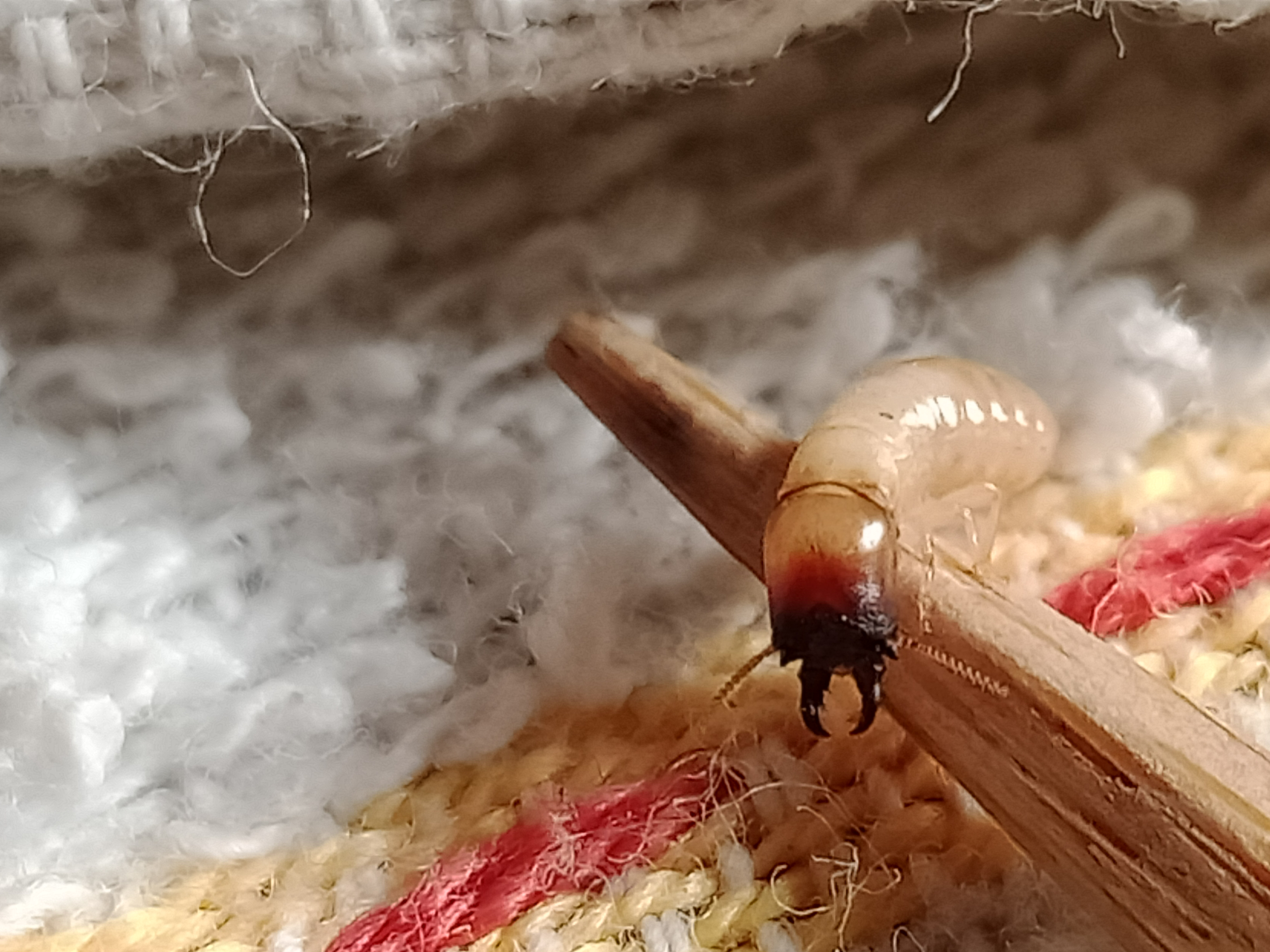
Soldier

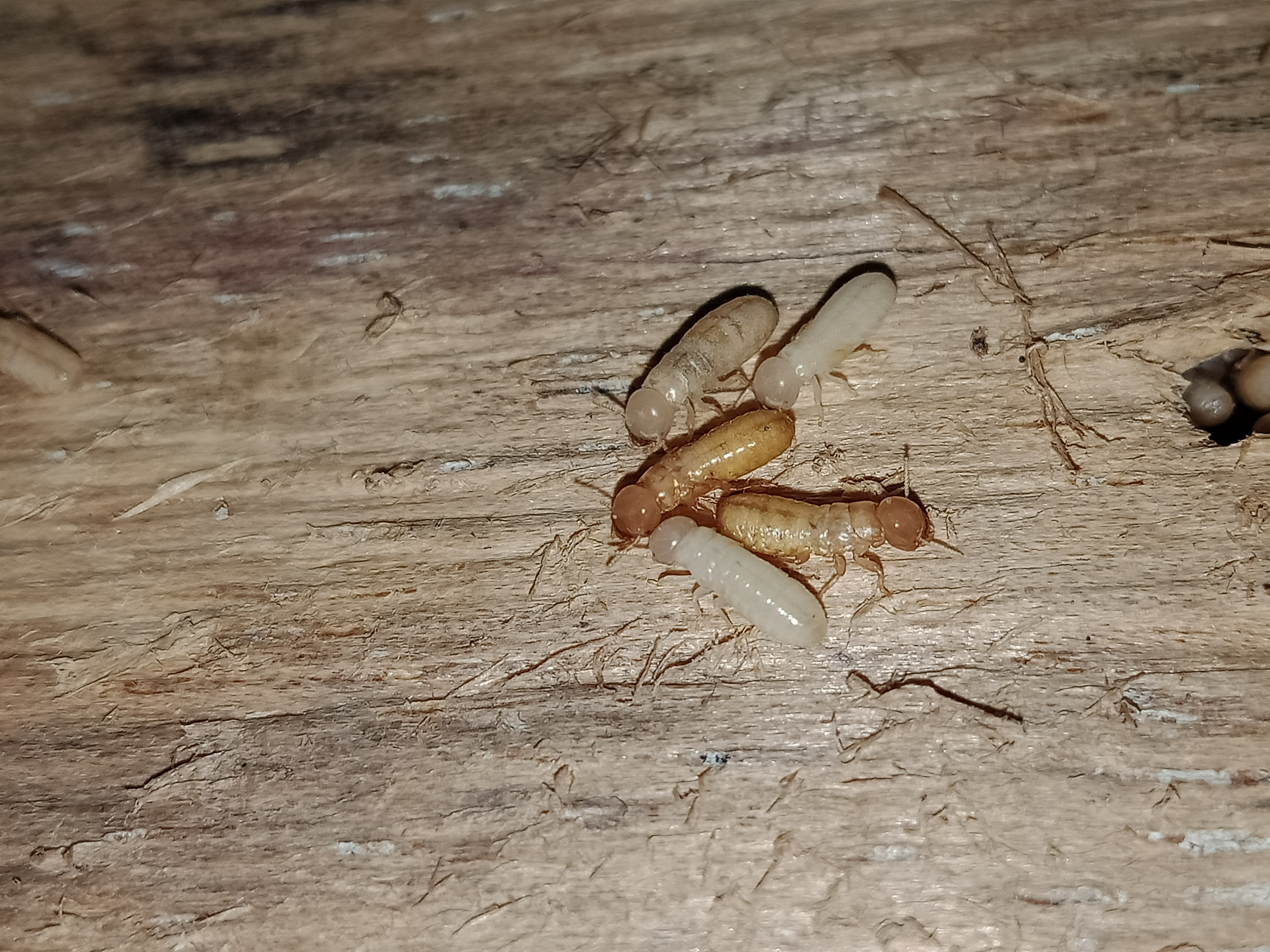
Neotenic Reproductive

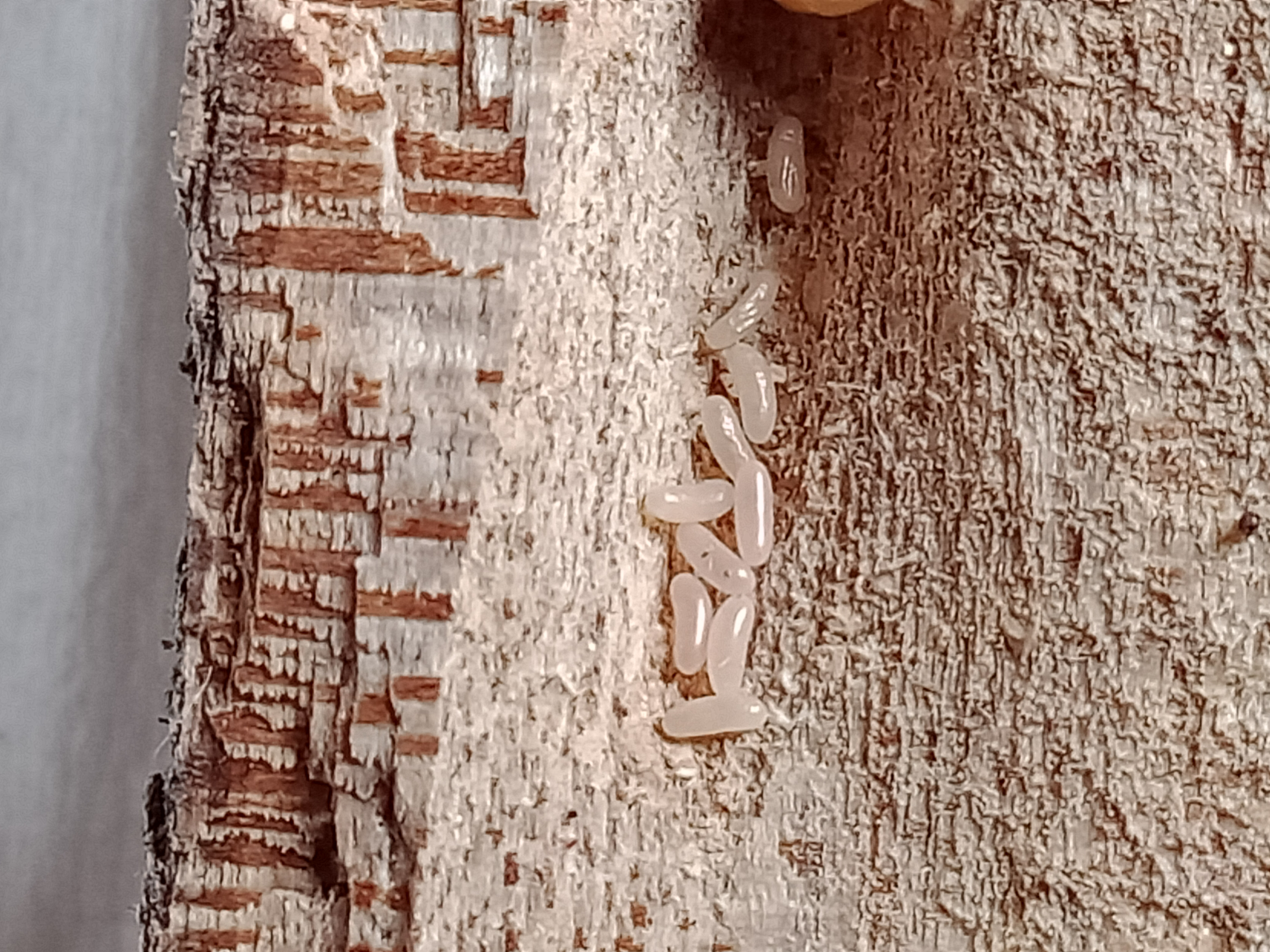
Eggs
