= Eurytermes ceylonicus =

Scientific classification
- Domain: Eukaryota
- Kingdom: Animalia
- Phylum: Arthropoda
- Class: Insecta
- Order: Blattodea
- Infraorder: Isoptera
- Family: Termitidae
- Genus: Eurytermes
- Species: E. ceylonicus

Binomial name
- Eurytermes ceylonicus Holmgren, 1913

Synonyms
- Eutermes ceyloniellus Kemner, 1926

Species of termite

Eurytermes ceylonicus, is a species of termite of the genus Eurytermes. It is native to India and Sri Lanka.
