= Pericapritermes ceylonicus =

Scientific classification
- Domain: Eukaryota
- Kingdom: Animalia
- Phylum: Arthropoda
- Class: Insecta
- Order: Blattodea
- Infraorder: Isoptera
- Family: Termitidae
- Genus: Pericapritermes
- Species: P. ceylonicus

Binomial name
- Pericapritermes ceylonicus (Holmgren, 1911)

Synonyms
- Capritermes ceylonicus Holmgren, 1911; Eutermes perparvus Holmgren, 1911; Capritermes distinctus Holmgren, 1913

Species of termite

Pericapritermes ceylonicus, is a species of small termite of the genus Pericapritermes. It is found in Sri Lanka and India.
