= Microcerotermes cylindriceps =

Scientific classification
- Domain: Eukaryota
- Kingdom: Animalia
- Phylum: Arthropoda
- Class: Insecta
- Order: Blattodea
- Infraorder: Isoptera
- Family: Termitidae
- Genus: Microcerotermes
- Species: M. cylindriceps

Binomial name
- Microcerotermes cylindriceps Wasmann, 1902

Species of termite

Microcerotermes cylindriceps, is a species of small termite of the genus Microcerotermes. It is found from Pankulum area of Sri Lanka.
