= Dicuspiditermes incola =

Scientific classification
- Domain: Eukaryota
- Kingdom: Animalia
- Phylum: Arthropoda
- Class: Insecta
- Order: Blattodea
- Infraorder: Isoptera
- Family: Termitidae
- Genus: Dicuspiditermes
- Species: D. incola

Binomial name
- Dicuspiditermes incola (Wasmann, 1893)

Synonyms
- Eutermes incola Wasmann, 1893; Capritermes longicornis Wasmann 1902; Dicuspiditermes pername Thakur & Chatterjee, 1971

Species of termite

Dicuspiditermes incola, is a species of small termite of the genus Dicuspiditermes. It is found in Sri Lanka and India.
