= Bifiditermes pintoi =

Scientific classification
- Domain: Eukaryota
- Kingdom: Animalia
- Phylum: Arthropoda
- Class: Insecta
- Order: Blattodea
- Infraorder: Isoptera
- Family: Kalotermitidae
- Genus: Bifiditermes
- Species: B. pintoi

Binomial name
- Bifiditermes pintoi (Kemner, 1932)

Synonyms
- Kalotermes pintoi Kemner,38 1932

Species of termite

Bifiditermes pintoi is a species of damp wood termite of the genus Bifiditermes. It is found in Sri Lanka.
