= Hypotermes obscuriceps =

Scientific classification
- Domain: Eukaryota
- Kingdom: Animalia
- Phylum: Arthropoda
- Class: Insecta
- Order: Blattodea
- Infraorder: Isoptera
- Family: Termitidae
- Genus: Hypotermes
- Species: H. obscuriceps

Binomial name
- Hypotermes obscuriceps (Wasmann, 1902)

Synonyms
- Termes obscuriceps Wasmann 1902; Odontotermes (Hypotermes) marshalli Kemner 1926

Species of termite

Hypotermes obscuriceps, is a species of termite of the genus Hypotermes. It is native to India, Sri Lanka and Vietnam. It constructs a termitaria and is a pest of tea.
