= Holomastigotoides =

Scientific classification
- Domain: Eukaryota
- Phylum: Metamonada
- Order: Spirotrichonymphida
- Family: Holomastigotoididae
- Genus: Holomastigotoides; Hartmann 1910

Species
- See text

Genus of flagellated protists

Holomastigotoides is a genus of parabasalids found in the hindgut of lower termites. It is characterized by its dense, organized arrangement of flagella on the cell surface and the presence of a mitotic spindle outside its nucleus during the majority of its cell cycle. As a symbiont of termites, Holomastigotoides is able to ingest wood and aid its host in digestion. In return, Holomastigotoides is supplied with a stable habitat and steady supply of food. Holomastigotoides has notably been studied to observe the mechanisms of chromosomal pairing and segregation in haploid and diploid cells.

== Taxonomy ==
Holomastigotoides was first described by Max Hartmann in 1910. Hartmann mistakenly identified Holomastigotoides as the female form of the parabasalid Trichonympha hertwigi, which he observed living in a species of termite, Coptotermes sp., in Brazil. After initial discovery, Giovanni Battista Grassi and Anna Foa reclassified Hartmann's “male” form of T. hertwigi to Holomastigotoides in 1911, thus establishing the first use of the genus. The original host species of Holomastigotoides described by Hartmann was later invalidated due to lack of description, and Coptotermes testaceus was subsequently named the type host for Holomastigotoides hertwigi as it is the only species of Coptotermes native to Brazil.

The following species are recognized:

- H. aureus
- H. batututi
- H. bigfooti
- H. hartmanni
- H. minor
- H. mirabile
- H. oxyrhynchus

== Habitat and ecology ==
Holomastigotoides is an obligate symbiont of lower termites. Holomastigotoides lives in hindguts of lower termites, where it feeds on wood and assists the termite in wood digestion. This allows the termite to access and use nutrients found in wood that they would not have been able to digest otherwise. Holomastigotoides can be transferred from termite to termite by way of feeding on anal secretions of other termites during juvenile stages.

Since discovery, Holomastigotoides species have been found in multiple termite genera, including Coptotermes, Heterotermes, Prorhinotermes, Psammotermes, and Anacanthotermes. It is possible for multiple species of Holomastigotoides to reside in an individual host termite species. This may be a result of speciation of Holomastigotoides within a single host species or a result of possible co-speciation between Holomastigotoides and its hosts.

== Morphology ==
=== Cell surface and flagella ===
Holomastigotoides is a cone-shaped cell. One of the most notable features of Holomastigotoides is the high density of flagella on the cell surface, with some reports of up to 10 000 flagella on a single cell. The organization of the flagella in Holomastigotoides is attributed to the arrangement of its flagellar bands in a spiral formation around the cell. The flagellar bands originate from the anterior apex of the cell and spiral posteriorly in progressively larger spirals, wrapping around the circumference of the cell. An individual flagellar band is made up of many basal bodies arranged in a single row, and a single flagellum emerges from each basal body, giving Holomastigotoides its characteristic, highly flagellated appearance. The basal bodies of a flagellar band are linked by a fiber system that consists of three different fiber types. Each flagellar band is associated with an axostyle, endoplasmic reticulum, and Golgi bodies. The high density of external flagella helps prevent pieces of ingested wood in the termite hindgut from contacting and damaging cell surfaces. The number of flagellar bands varies based on the species of Holomastigotoides. The posterior base of Holomastigotoides cells are not flagellated, and contain vesicles that are likely used for phagocytosis of wood.

=== Basal bodies and fiber system ===
Near the anterior apex of the cell, the basal bodies are arranged tightly together within the flagellar bands, to such an extent that some basal bodies will overlap with each other. The fiber system associated with the basal bodies is also compressed in this apical region, and thus the fiber types are more difficult to distinguish. As basal bodies become more widely spaced further away from the cell apex, the fiber types are also easier to distinguish. Basal bodies transition into flagella distally, and the transition point is indicated by a transition plate. An axosome is found between the transition plate and the central microtubules of an individual flagellum.

Holomastigotoides also possesses parabasal bodies, as is characteristic of parabasalids. The parabasal bodies consist of a Golgi body and a parabasal fiber, and are closely associated with the basal bodies of the flagella. Golgi bodies have been observed to overlap with parabasal fibers near the base of the nucleus.

The basal bodies of a flagellar band are linked by a fiber system, which consists of the parabasal fiber, fibrous ribbon, and KI fiber. The parabasal fiber provides a surface for microtubule formation, and there is one parabasal fiber for each flagellar band. The parabasal fiber possesses a dark lining that has been suggested to be a microtubule organizing centre for the axostyle. The size of parabasal fibers decreases as they extend further past the apex, to the point where they cannot be observed in the mid-region or base of the cell. Parabasal fibers are densely concentrated in the cell's apex, and axostyles closely associated with the parabasal fibers also accumulate in this location. The fibrous ribbon is a long sheet that looks like an accordion, and connects all the basal bodies in an individual flagellar band. An individual fibrous ribbon is as long as the length of an individual flagellar body. KI fibers are named for their distinctive shape, and specifically link basal bodies in triplets. KI fibers can change shape, which also changes the distance between basal bodies and regulates how close or far they are from each other. The fibrous ribbon and KI fiber are thought to have a role in controlling cell shape by moving the flagellar bands. They also play roles in regulating the direction a Holomastigotoides cell moves in, coordinating the beating of flagella, and assisting in accommodating large pieces of wood during phagocytosis.

=== Axostyles ===
Axostyles can be located along the entire length of a flagellar band. They can extend from the cytoplasm to the cell base and surround the nucleus. They can also be found in the cortical cytoplasm, which is the cytoplasm that falls between the plasma membrane and flagellar basal bodies. Axostyles in the cortical cytoplasm extend along the entire length of the flagellar bands. Some axostyles follow the spiral arrangement of the flagellar bands and regulate the positions of the Golgi bodies and endoplasmic reticulum in the cell. Notably, flagellar bands 4 and 5 are specialized, and possess extensions into the cytoplasm that contain the poles of the cell's extra-nuclear mitotic spindle.

=== Cytoskeleton ===
Centrin is a protein found in the cytoskeleton of eukaryotic cells, and plays a role in cell division. In Holomastigotoides cells, there is a high concentration of centrin at the apex of the cell associated with the parabasal fibers, the flagellar bands, and the mitotic spindle. As these are sites where changes in cell shape and movement are initiated, this implies a possible role of centrin in controlling cell shape, direction of movement, and mitosis. Holomastigotoides has been observed to change cell shape and direction of movement constantly. Intracellular calcium ion concentration affects centrin, which in turn can change flagellar band structure and basal body orientation.

=== Cytoplasm ===
In the cytoplasm, food vacuoles are distributed widely and contain ingested wood. Ingested wood particles and glycogen have also been observed to be freely distributed throughout the cytoplasm.

Instead of mitochondria, hydrogenosomes are found in Holomastigotoides cells. They are responsible for producing ATP when converting pyruvate to acetate, providing Holomastigotoides cells with energy. The hydrogenosomes are located either between the plasma membrane and flagellar basal bodies or dispersed throughout the cytoplasm. They are thought to accumulate near the basal bodies to support high energy demands of the flagella, and have been observed to divide independently. Golgi bodies can be found on the interior side of flagellar bands, spaced evenly. Endoplasmic reticulum elements can be found between Golgi and basal bodies.

=== Nucleus and mitotic spindle ===
The nucleus of Holomastigotoides is located in the anterior apex of the cell, and is associated with a mitotic spindle located outside of the nucleus. This mitotic spindle is persistent throughout most of the cell cycle, which is unusual for eukaryotic cells and characteristic of Holomastigotoides. An extranuclear matrix surrounds the nuclear envelope, except at the points where it contacts the mitotic spindle. Kinetochores insert into the nuclear envelope at the points of contact with the spindle poles. The nucleus maintains its characteristic position at the cell's apex through contact between kinetochores and spindle poles and apical parabasal fibers. In many other eukaryotic cells, most of the cytoplasmic microtubules are dissociated to form the mitotic spindle. However, this is not the case in Holomastigotoides cells. The mitotic spindle of Holomastigotoides is unique in that it remains in the cell during most of the cell cycle, along with the flagella. Spindle poles are present to maintain spindle microtubules while the mitotic spindle is present. This is possible because cytoplasmic microtubules and mitotic microtubules have different origins in the Holomastigotoides cell. The microtubules used for the cytoskeleton and mitosis are separate, and thus the cytoskeleton does not need to be disassembled for cell division to be initiated in Holomastigotoides. The persistence of the extra-nuclear mitotic spindle and presence of MPM-2, a mitotic protein, indicates that Holomastigotoides spend most of their cell cycle in a suspended stage of prophase.

== Chromosomes and cell division ==
Holomastigotoides has two forms: haploid and diploid. In the haploid form, it possesses two chromosomes. In the diploid form, it possesses four chromosomes. Forms with greater ploidies have also been observed, and ploidies can vary between individuals belonging to the same species of Holomastigotoides.

The chromosomes of Holomastigotoides can easily be distinguished due to size, as one will be shorter than the other. As the chromosomes replicate, they uncoil and appear to extend in length. After replication, the sister chromatids re-coil and shorten before separating and pairing with their homologues. Chromosomes have been observed to have terminal centromeres. Crossing over has been observed, possibly to prevent complete segregation or no segregation of the chromatids.

Holomastigotoides has been observed to reproduce through asexual division. During cell division, the nucleus and chromosomes elongate longitudinally. A constriction forms in the middle of the nucleus until two daughter nuclei are produced, effectively splitting the chromosomes in half so that each daughter nucleus has the same chromosomes. Chromosome division has been observed to occur in a longitudinal direction, rather than transverse. In Holomastigotoides, telophase has been observed in greater detail. Telophase occurs via the separation and coiling of flagellar band. While this flagellar band coils, it pulls a daughter nucleus to the basal end of the cell. The number of flagellar bands in a daughter cell is determined by duplication of basal bodies at the end of cell division.

== Taxonomy ==
The species of Holomastigotoides found in the Rhinotermitidae form a monophyletic group, which suggests that Holomastigotoides has been ancestrally present in this group of termites. This is supported by the observation of Holomastigotoides in Prorhinotermes simplex and other genera in the Rhinotermitidae. P. simplex branches separately from other genera in the Rhinotermitidae, implying the ancestral condition of Holomastigotoides. Two Holomastigotoides species in Coptotermes testaceus branch with two Holomastigotoides species in C. formosanus, which suggests that Holomastigotoides may have speciated alongside its host termites. However, the presence of multiple Holomastigotoides species in host species eliminates the possibility that Holomastigotoides strictly co-speciated with its host termites, and other mechanisms are likely involved in the phenomena observed.

There is strong support for Holomastigotoides to form a monophyletic group with species found in Coptotermes.
