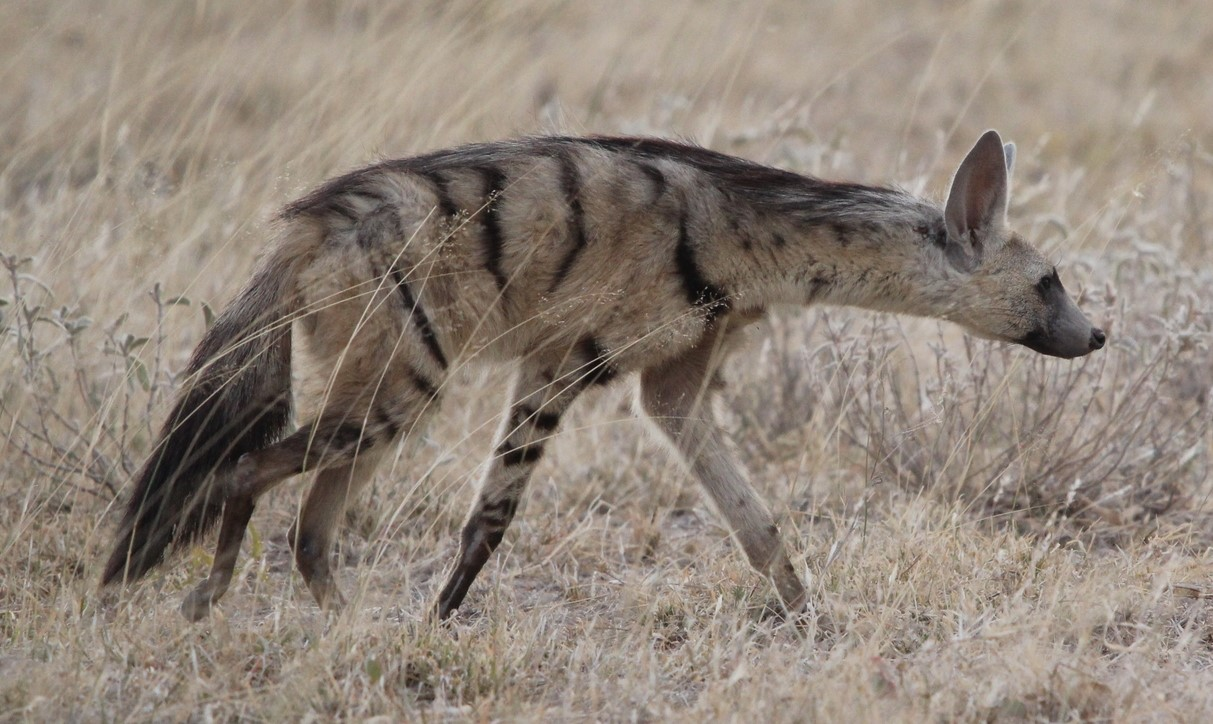
- An aardwolf in Buffalo Springs National Reserve, Kenya

Conservation status
- Least Concern (IUCN 3.1)
- CITES Appendix III

Scientific classification
- Kingdom: Animalia
- Phylum: Chordata
- Class: Mammalia
- Order: Carnivora
- Family: Hyaenidae
- Subfamily: Protelinae
- Genus: Proteles
- Species: P. cristatus

Binomial name
- Proteles cristatus (Sparrman, 1783)
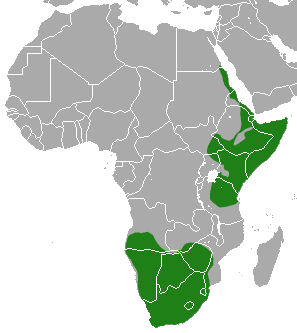
- Aardwolf range Extant (resident)

Synonyms
- Synonymy: Proteles cristata Sparrman, 1783; Proteles typicus Smith, 1834; Viverra cristata Sparrman, 1783; Viverra hyenoides Desmarest, 1820

= Aardwolf =

Aardwolf Temporal range: Pleistocene – recent

Species of insectivorous African mammal

The aardwolf (Proteles cristatus) is an insectivorous hyaenid species, native to East and Southern Africa. Its name means "earth-wolf" in Afrikaans and Dutch. It is also called the maanhaarjakkals (Afrikaans for 'mane-jackal'), termite-eating hyena and civet hyena, based on its habit of secreting substances from its anal gland, a characteristic shared with the African civet.

Unlike many of its relatives in the order Carnivora, the aardwolf does not hunt large animals. It eats insects and their larvae, mainly termites; one aardwolf can lap up as many as 300,000 termites during a single night using its long, sticky tongue. The aardwolf's tongue has adapted to be tough enough to withstand the strong bite of termites.

The aardwolf lives in the shrublands of Eastern and Southern Africa – open lands covered with stunted trees and shrubs. It is nocturnal, resting in burrows during the day and emerging at night to seek food.

== Taxonomy ==
The aardwolf is generally classified as part of the hyena family Hyaenidae, but it was formerly placed in its own family Protelidae. (Note: Some sources such as Coetzee in Meester and Setzer (1977), Köhler and Ricardson (1990), and Yalden, Largen, and Koch (1980), classify the aardwolf in its own family still.) Early on, scientists felt that it was merely mimicking the striped hyena, which subsequently led to the creation of the Protelidae. Recent studies have suggested that the aardwolf probably diverged from other hyaenids early on; how early is still unclear, as the fossil record and genetic studies disagree by 10 million years. (Note: The fossil record shows 18–20 mya, and genetic studies indicate roughly 10.6 mya.)

The aardwolf is the only surviving species in the subfamily Protelinae. Disagreement remains as to whether the species is monotypic, or can be divided into subspecies. A 2021 study found the genetic differences in eastern and southern aardwolves may be pronounced enough to categorize them as species. So, the American Society of Mammalogists currently considers Proteles cristatus and P. septentrionalis to be separate species.

Image	Subspecies	Distribution
	P. c. cristatus	Southern Africa
	P. c. septentrionalis Rothschild, 1902	East Africa.

A 2006 molecular analysis indicates it is phylogenetically sister to the other three extant hyaenidae species.

- Hyaenidae
  - - Proteles cristatus (aardwolf)
  - - Crocuta crocuta (spotted hyena)
    - - Hyaena hyaena (striped hyena)
      - Parahyaena brunnea (brown hyena)

== Etymology ==
The generic name Proteles is derived from two words of Greek origin: Ancient Greek: πρῶτος, prōtos and Ancient Greek: τέλειος téleios, which combined mean "complete in front", referring to the aardwolf's five toes on the front paws and four on the hind paws. The specific name cristatus is derived from Latin and means "provided with a comb or tuft", relating to its mane.

== Description ==
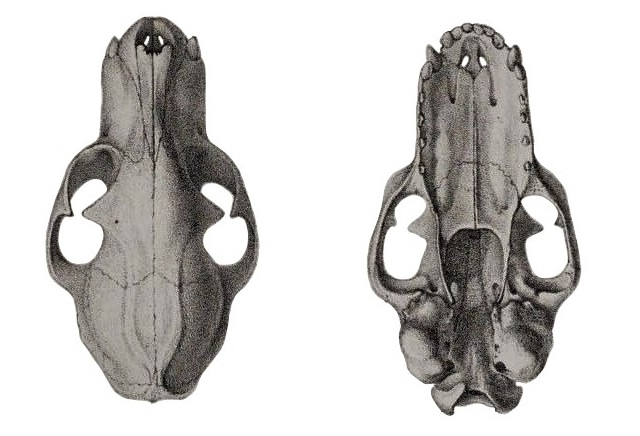
Dorsal and ventral aspect of skull

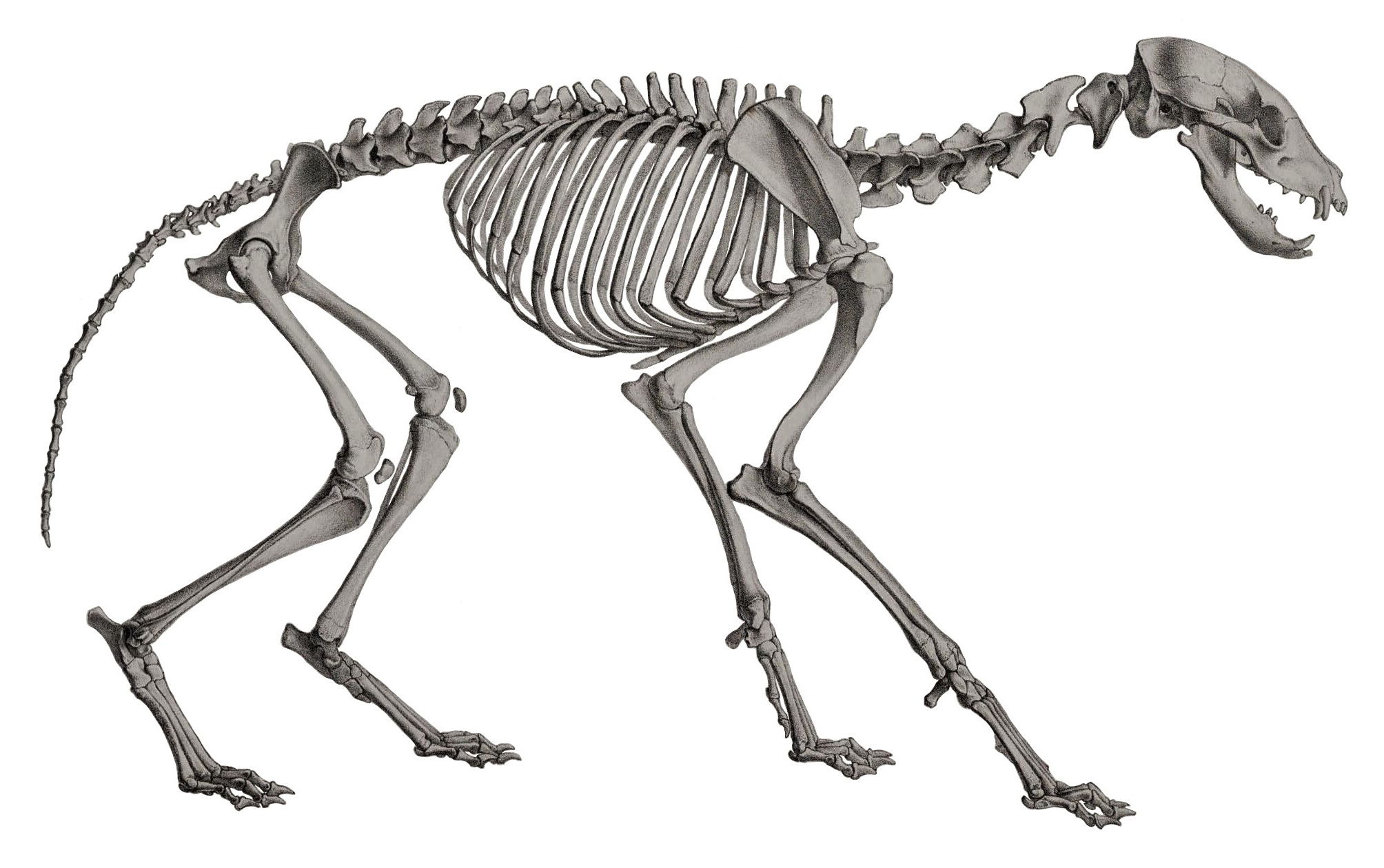
Skeleton

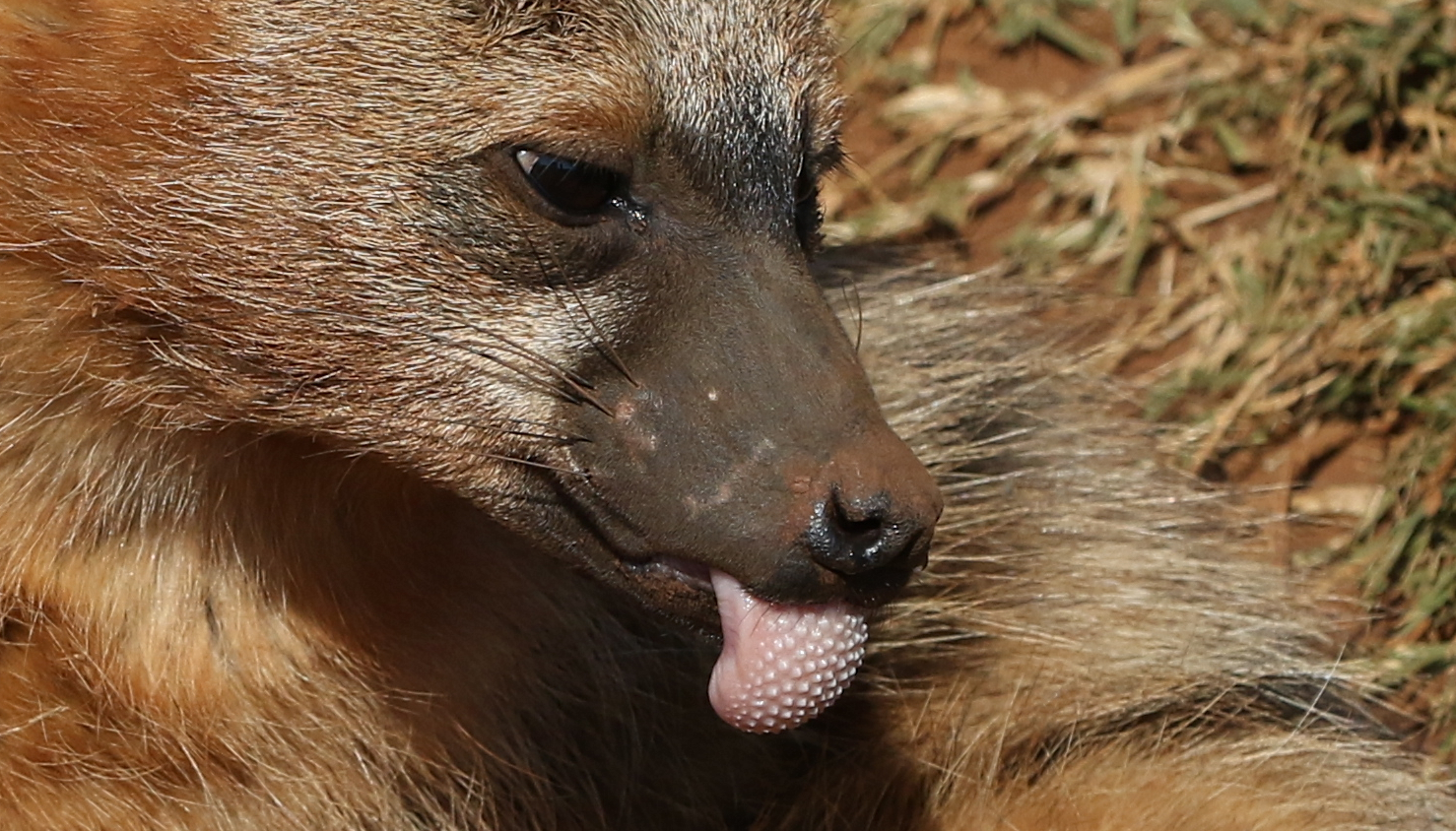
Aardwolf with tongue exposed: Note the prominent papillae.

The aardwolf resembles a much smaller and thinner striped hyena, with a more slender muzzle, black vertical stripes on a coat of yellowish fur, and a long, distinct mane down the midline of the neck and back. It also has one or two diagonal stripes down the fore- and hindquarters and several stripes on its legs. The mane is raised during confrontations to make the aardwolf appear larger. It is missing the throat spot that others in the family have. Its lower leg (from the knee down) is all black, and its tail is bushy with a black tip.

The aardwolf is about 55 to 80 cm (22 to 31 in) long, excluding its bushy tail, which is about 20–30 cm (7.9–11.8 in) long, and stands about 40 to 50 cm (16 to 20 in) tall at the shoulders. An adult aardwolf weighs about 7–10 kg (15–22 lb), sometimes reaching 15 kg (33 lb). The aardwolves in the south of the continent tend to be slightly smaller (about 10 kg (22 lb)) than the eastern population (around 14 kg (31 lb)). This makes the aardwolf the smallest extant member of the Hyaenidae. The front feet have five toes each, unlike the four-toed hyena. The skull is similar in shape to those of other hyenas, though much smaller, and its cheek teeth are specialised for eating insects. It still has canines, but unlike other hyenas, these teeth are used primarily for fighting and defense. Its ears, which are large, are very similar to those of the striped hyena.

As an aardwolf ages, it typically loses some of its teeth, though this has little impact on its feeding habits due to the softness of the insects that it eats.

== Distribution and habitat ==
Aardwolves live in open, dry plains and bushland, avoiding mountainous areas. Due to their specific food requirements, they are found only in regions where termites of the family Hodotermitidae occur. Termites of this family depend on dead and withered grass and are most populous in heavily grazed grasslands and savannahs, including farmland. For most of the year, aardwolves spend time in shared territories consisting of up to a dozen dens, which are occupied for 6 weeks at a time.

The two distinct populations occur in Southern Africa or in East and Northeast Africa. The species does not occur in the intermediary miombo forests.

== Behavior and ecology ==
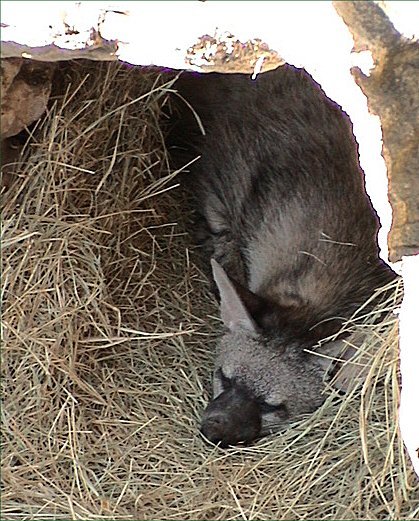
Aardwolf at the San Antonio Zoo

Aardwolves are shy and nocturnal, sleeping in burrows by day. On occasion during the winter, they become diurnal feeders. This happens during the coldest periods, as they then stay in at night to conserve heat.

They are primarily solitary animals, though during mating season, they form monogamous pairs, which occupy a territory with their young. An adult pair, along with their most-recent offspring, occupies a territory of 1–4 km^{2} (0.39–1.54 sq mi). If their territory is infringed upon by another aardwolf, they chase the intruder away for up to 400 m (1,300 ft) or to the border. If the intruder is caught, which rarely happens, a fight usually occurs, which is accompanied by soft clucking, hoarse barking, and a type of roar. Most incursions occur during mating season, typically once or twice per week. When food is scarce, the stringent territorial system may be abandoned, and as many as three pairs may occupy a single territory.

The territory is marked by both sexes, as they both have developed anal glands from which they extrude a black substance that is smeared on rocks or grass stalks in 5 mm-long (0.2 in) streaks. Aardwolves also have scent glands on the forefoot and penile pad. They often mark near termite mounds within their territory every 20 minutes or so. If they are patrolling their territorial boundaries, the marking frequency increases drastically, to once every 50 m (160 ft). At this rate, an individual may mark 60 marks per hour, and upwards of 200 per night.

An aardwolf pair's territory may have up to 10 dens, and numerous middens, where they dig small holes and bury their feces with sand. Their dens are usually abandoned aardvark, springhare, or porcupine dens, or on occasion they are crevices in rocks. They also dig their own dens, or enlarge dens started by springhares. They typically only use one or two dens at a time, rotating through all of their dens every 6 months. During the summer, they may rest outside their den during the night and sleep underground during the heat of the day.

Aardwolves are not fast runners, nor are they particularly adept at fighting off predators. Therefore, when threatened, they may attempt to mislead their foe by doubling back on their tracks. If confronted, they may raise their manes in an attempt to appear more menacing, and also may emit a foul-smelling liquid from their anal glands.

=== Feeding ===
The aardwolf feeds primarily on termites and more specifically on Trinervitermes and Hodotermes. These two genera of termites has different species throughout the aardwolf's range. In East Africa, they eat T. bettonianus, in central Africa, they eat T. rhodesiensis, and in southern Africa, they eat T. trinervoides. Their technique consists of licking them off the ground as opposed to the aardvark, which digs into the mound. They locate their food by sound and also from the scent secreted by the soldier termites. Aardwolves may consume up to 250,000 termites per night using their long, broad, sticky tongues.

They do not destroy the termite mound or consume the entire colony, thus ensuring that the termites can rebuild and provide a continuous supply of food. They often memorize the location of such nests and return to them every few months. During certain seasonal events, such as the onset of the rainy season and the cold of midwinter, the primary termites become scarce, so the need for other foods becomes pronounced. During these times, the southern aardwolf seeks out Hodotermes mossambicus, a type of harvester termite active in the afternoon, which explains some of their diurnal behavior in the winter. The eastern aardwolf, during the rainy season, subsists on termites from the genera Odontotermes and Macrotermes. They are also known to feed on other insects and larvae, and some sources mention, very occasionally, small mammals and birds, but these constitute a very small percentage of their total diet. They use their wide tongues to lap surface-foraging termites off of the ground and consume large quantities of sand in the process, which aids in digestion in the absence of teeth to break down their food.

Unlike other hyenas, aardwolves do not scavenge or kill larger animals. Contrary to popular myths, aardwolves do not eat carrion, and if they are seen eating while hunched over a dead carcass, they are actually eating larvae and beetles. Also, contrary to some sources, they do not like meat, unless it is finely ground or cooked for them. The adult aardwolf was formerly assumed to forage in small groups, but more recent research has shown that they are primarily solitary foragers, necessary because of the scarcity of their insect prey. Their primary source, Trinervitermes species, forage in small but dense patches of 25–100 cm (9.8–39.4 in). While foraging, the aardwolf can cover about 1 km (0.62 mi) per hour, which translates to 8–12 km (5.0–7.5 mi) per summer night and 3–8 km (1.9–5.0 mi) per winter night.

=== Breeding ===
The breeding season varies depending on location, but normally takes place during autumn or spring. In South Africa, breeding occurs in early July. During the breeding season, unpaired male aardwolves search their own territory, as well as others, for a female with which to mate. Dominant males also mate opportunistically with the females of less dominant neighboring aardwolves, which can result in conflict between rival males. Dominant males even go a step further and as the breeding season approaches, they make increasingly greater and greater incursions onto weaker males' territories. As the female comes into oestrus, they add pasting to their tricks inside of the other territories, sometimes doing so more in rivals' territories than their own. Females also, when given the opportunity, mate with the dominant male, which increases the chances of the dominant male guarding "his" cubs with her. Copulation lasts between 1 and 4 1/2 hours.

Gestation lasts between 89 and 92 days, producing two to five cubs (most often two or three) during the rainy season (October–December), when termites are more active. They are born with their eyes open, but initially are helpless, and weigh around 200–350 g (7.1–12.3 oz). The first 6-8 weeks are spent in the den with their parents. The male may spend up to 6 hours a night watching over the cubs, while the mother is out looking for food. After 3 months, they begin supervised foraging, and by 4 months, are normally independent, though they often share a den with their mother until the next breeding season. By the time the next set of cubs is born, the older cubs have moved on. Aardwolves generally achieve sexual maturity at 1 1/2-2 years old.

== Conservation ==
The aardwolf has not seen decreasing numbers and is relatively widespread throughout eastern Africa. They are not common throughout their range, as they maintain a density of no more than 1/km^{2}, if food is abundant. Because of these factors, the IUCN has rated the aardwolf as least concern. In some areas, they are persecuted because of the mistaken belief that they prey on livestock; however, they are actually beneficial to the farmers because they eat termites that are detrimental. In other areas, the farmers have recognized this, but they are still killed, on occasion, for their fur. Dogs and insecticides are also common killers of the aardwolf.

=== In captivity ===
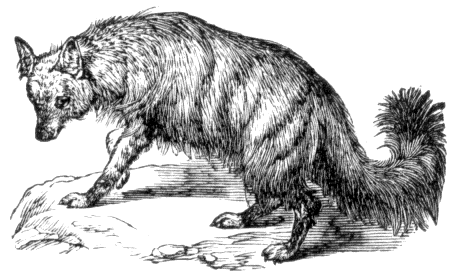
Illustration of Proteles cristatus

Frankfurt Zoo in Germany was home to the oldest recorded aardwolf in captivity at 18 years and 11 months.

The eastern subspecies is kept in one zoo as of August 2026: the Novosibirsk Zoo.

The southern subspecies is more common in zoos. It is kept in zoos in the Czech Republic, the United Kingdom, the United States, South Africa, and the United Arab Emirates, and as of March 2026, the subspecies was kept in 15 zoos around the world.
