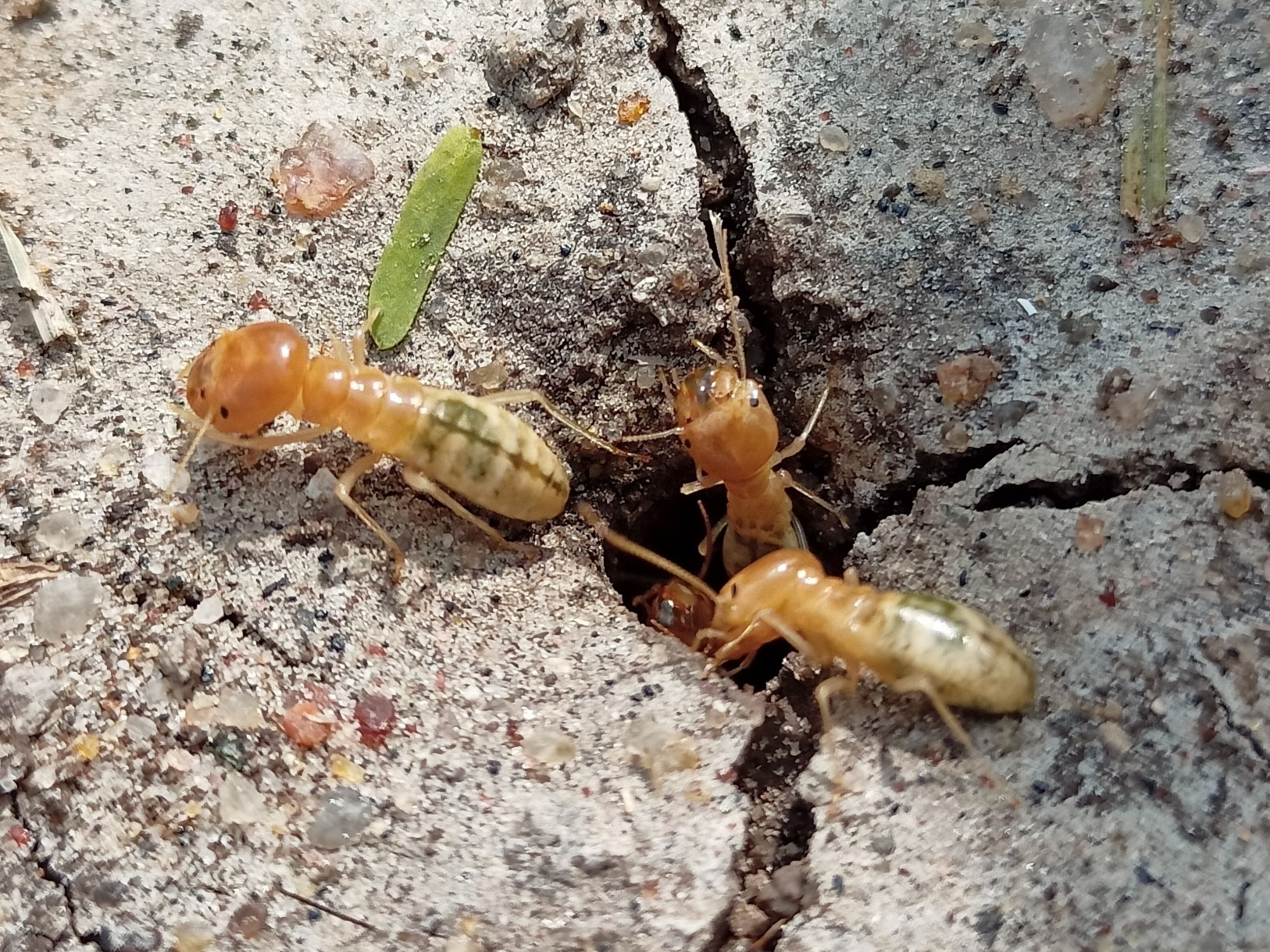

Scientific classification
- Kingdom: Animalia
- Phylum: Arthropoda
- Clade: Pancrustacea
- Class: Insecta
- Order: Blattodea
- Infraorder: Isoptera
- Family: Hodotermitidae
- Genus: Anacanthotermes
- Species: A. viarum

Binomial name
- Anacanthotermes viarum (König, 1779)

Synonyms
- Termes viarum Konig, 1779; Hodotermes (Anacanthotermes) koenigi Holmgren & Holmgren, 1917; Anacanthotermes rugifrons Mathur & Sen-Sarma,30 1958

= Anacanthotermes viarum =

Species of termite

Anacanthotermes viarum is a species of harvester termite in the family Hodotermitidae. It is found in India and Sri Lanka. It is a grass feeder.
