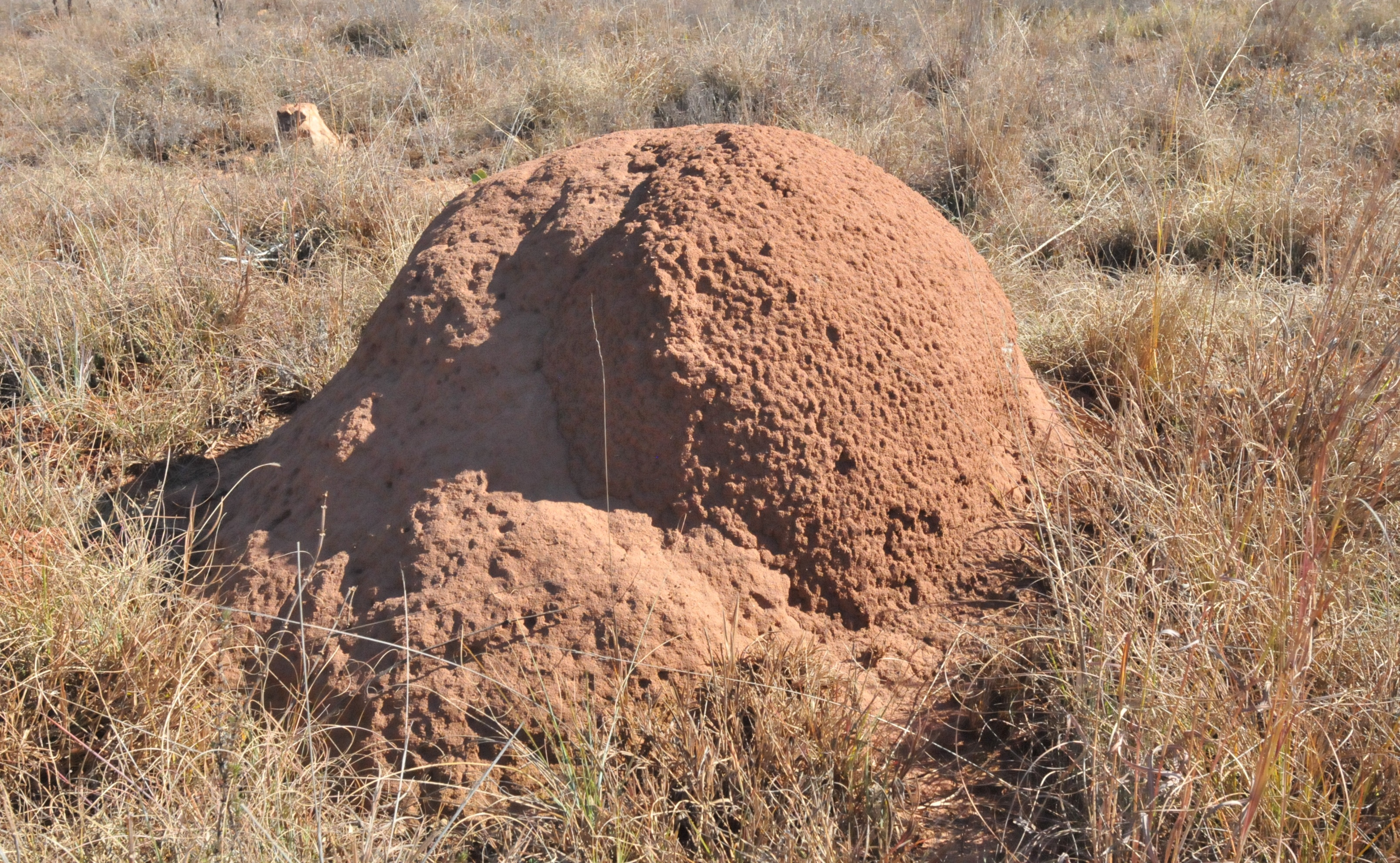
- Domed mound of T. trinervoides

Scientific classification
- Kingdom: Animalia
- Phylum: Arthropoda
- Clade: Pancrustacea
- Class: Insecta
- Order: Blattodea
- Infraorder: Isoptera
- Family: Termitidae
- Genus: Trinervitermes
- Species: T. trinervoides

Binomial name
- Trinervitermes trinervoides (Sjöstedt, 1911)

= Trinervitermes trinervoides =

Species of termite

Trinervitermes trinervoides is a species of termite belonging to family Termitidae. It is native to and widespread in southern Africa where it inhabits mesic to semi-arid grasslands. Due to the snout on the head of soldiers, and their grass collecting habits, they are known as snouted harvester termites.

== Range and habitat ==
It is found in South Africa, Namibia, Zimbabwe and Mozambique, and is widely distributed and common south of the Limpopo River. The species lives in savannah or grassland areas, and avoids barren land. Related species are found in the east of the subcontinent.

== Biology ==
The snouted harvester termite is a mostly nocturnal species. The species stores grass within its mounds, just beneath the surface. Evidence shows that the species is probably not polycalic and thus each mound will house only a single colony. Since the soldier termites of this species can shoot aversive chemical compounds through their fontanelle squirt gun located on their heads, African insectivores such as the bat-eared fox are not capable to feed on its colonies in a systematic way.

== Foraging behavior ==
It forages with groups of 3-5 individual wide columns, moving from the foraging holes some distance from the main mound and radiating out towards grasses. The species forages during the night and avoids foraging during the winter months of June–August. The foraging itself can last anywhere from 2 hours to 6.5 hours. It feeds in a manner typical of harvester termites. Trinervitermes trinervoides forages on the surface completely exposed, unlike most similar species of termite. This species is able to manage this by secreting a chemical containing a mixture of diterpenes and monoterpenes. This chemical defense can cause significant internal damage to predators and works to deter the large majority of predators. One of their main predators is aardwolves, which are able to eat up to 300,000 termites a night while seeming unperturbed by this toxin.

== Effect on the land ==
The mound building causes disturbances that build nutritional value as well as improving drainage and fertility. All of these improve vegetation and thus herbivore concentration in an area. Oftentimes these disturbances can be strong enough to switch the ecosystem from a grassy vegetated area to a tree, shrub, and pioneer species landscape.

Studies have shown that the composition and abundance of plant life on and around a T. trinervoides mound vary depending on the mound age. Active mounds support the growth of both a climax and a pioneer grass in the immediate area, while an eroded mound supports subclimax grass and shrubs. It is shown that soils that contain eroded mounds have higher nutrient contents than soils as close as 0.5 meters away.

The species has developed a method of foraging and storing the grass it collects near the surface of the mounds. Because they rely on open cover foraging, which in winter might be unavailable, and unlike most species of termite they store their food to avoid leaving the mound when the cold makes this difficult. Soldiers are also used to defend the foragers while the food is collected, having them patrol between their holes and the foraging area continuously.
