= Prorhinotermes flavus =

Scientific classification
- Kingdom: Animalia
- Phylum: Arthropoda
- Clade: Pancrustacea
- Class: Insecta
- Order: Blattodea
- Infraorder: Isoptera
- Family: Psammotermitidae
- Genus: Prorhinotermes
- Species: P. flavus

Binomial name
- Prorhinotermes flavus (Bugnion & Popoff, 1910)

Synonyms
- Coptotermes flavus Bugnion & Popoff, 1910; Prorhinotermes shiva Roonwal & Thakur, 1963

Species of termite

Prorhinotermes flavus is a species of subterranean termite of the genus Prorhinotermes. It is native to India,Southeast Asia,Sri Lanka, Andaman Islands and Nicobar Islands. It is found in coastal areas such as mangroves. It shows both dampwood and subterranean termite behavior, nesting in dead trees but foraging on soil as a typical subterranean termite. It is not known to be a pest.
