= Prorhinotermes simplex =

Scientific classification
- Kingdom: Animalia
- Phylum: Arthropoda
- Clade: Pancrustacea
- Class: Insecta
- Order: Blattodea
- Infraorder: Isoptera
- Family: Psammotermitidae
- Genus: Prorhinotermes
- Species: P. simplex

Binomial name
- Prorhinotermes simplex (Hagen, 1858)

Species of termite

Prorhinotermes simplex, the Cuban subterranean termite, is a species of lower termite in the genus Prorhinotermes. It is found in Colombia. Like others in its genus, it is a single-site nesting termite that moves to a new food source when theirs is gone, and it lacks a true worker caste.

== Caste ==
Like all other members of Prorhinotermes, P. simplex lacks a true worker caste (meaning permanently sterile workers) and has a linear ontogenetical pathway with a single nymphal instar.

Soldiers typically arise from the late larval stage in mature colonies and can be identified from their marked wing rudiments. Each of their two molts from larva to soldier adds an antenna segment, and they contain a lot of the chemicals (E)-1-nitropentadecene and (Z,E)-α-Farnesene. They make up from 7-22% of each colony's population. They typically guard inside the nest, but they will come out as defenders if the nest is moved. Soldiers have been found to evacuate eggs when their nests are disturbed as well.

== Microbiome ==
A type of excavate, named Cthulhu macrofasciculumque after the creature Cthulhu has been found in these termites' guts to allow for their digestion of wood, as termites and all other species in Animalia lack the ability to harvest nutrients from wood using their own anatomy.
