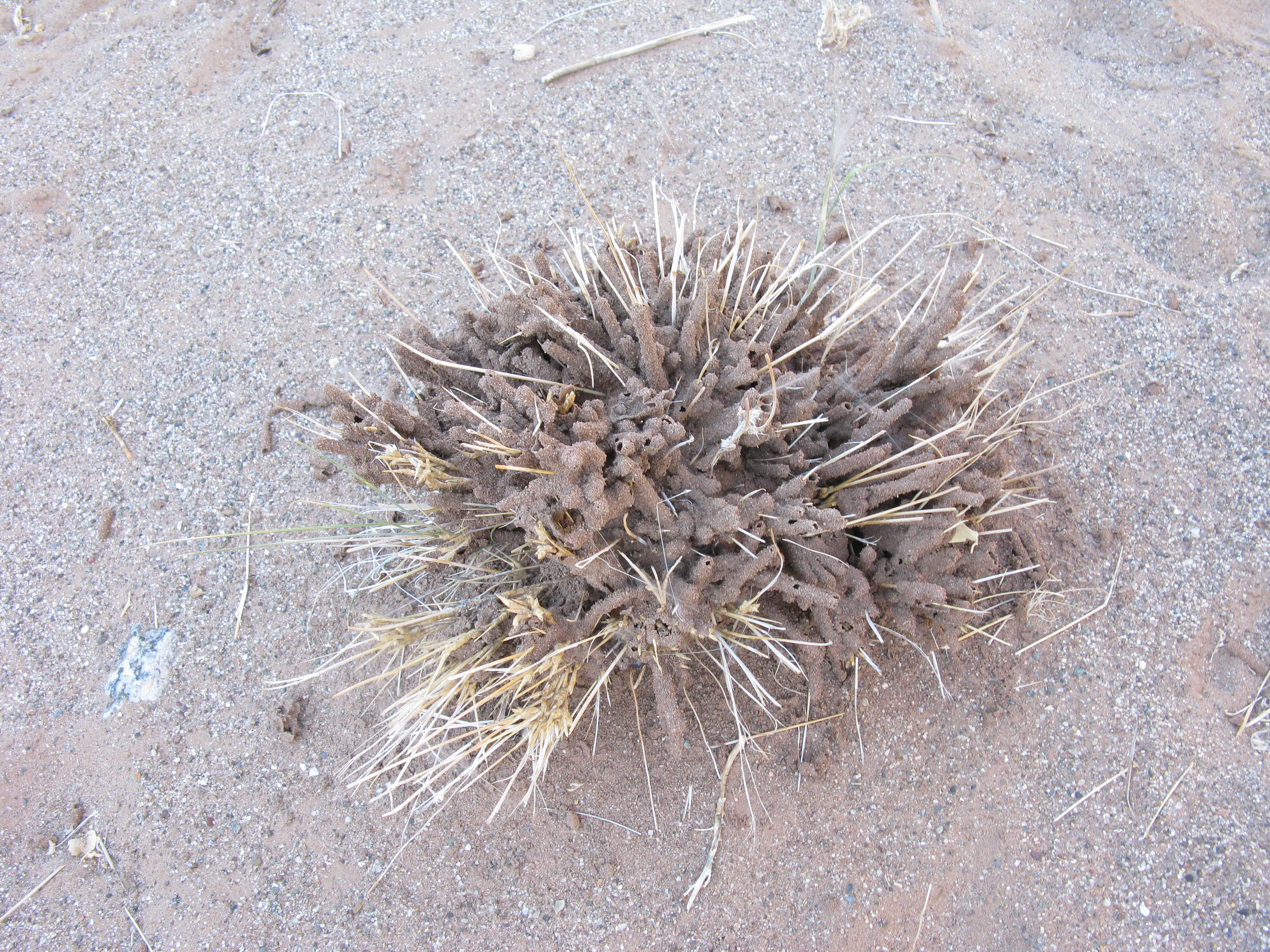
- Psammotermes soil sheeting on forage above ground in Namibia. During the day, the termites largely go underground to avoid the heat

Scientific classification
- Kingdom: Animalia
- Phylum: Arthropoda
- Clade: Pancrustacea
- Class: Insecta
- Order: Blattodea
- Infraorder: Isoptera
- Family: Psammotermitidae
- Genus: Psammotermes; Desneux 1902

Species
- See text

= Psammotermes =

Genus of termites

Psammotermes is a genus of termites in the subfamily Psammotermitinae, nested within the family Psammotermitidae. It is found living in subterranean nests in arid parts of Africa.

== Distribution and habitat ==
Psammotermes is found in deserts and arid regions of Africa, in sand or eroded areas, but not heavy clay or alluvial soils. It is the termite genus best adapted for desert life and replaces Anacanthotermes in the driest areas. In is to be found in places with some vegetation or even where there is none, where it is believed to subsist on wind blown accumulations of organic detritus. It can live on buried timber, perhaps relics of a previous era when the climate was wetter.

== Behaviour ==
Psammotermes colonies are underground nests consisting of chambers and narrow galleries that they excavate themselves, although they have been known to inhabit the disused nests of Amitermes, Baucaliotermes and Trinervitermes. They are generalist feeders and consume anything including animal dung, roadside litter (cartons, boxes etc.), dead grass, leaf litter, discarded material in the waste dumps of the harvester termites Hodotermes mossambicus and Microhodotermes viator, dead bushes, branches and logs lying on the surface, fence posts and the structural timbers of buildings. Most of these food sources are approached from underground, but sheeting may cover large items and sheeted runways are sometimes constructed leading to exposed items. The nest is usually built in buried timber but in some nests, this does not seem to be the case.s

== Species ==
The Encyclopedia of Life and Termite Catalogue list the following species:

- Psammotermes allocerus
- Psammotermes hybostoma
- Psammotermes prohybostoma
- Psammotermes rajasthanicus
- Psammotermes senegalensis
- Psammotermes voeltzkow
