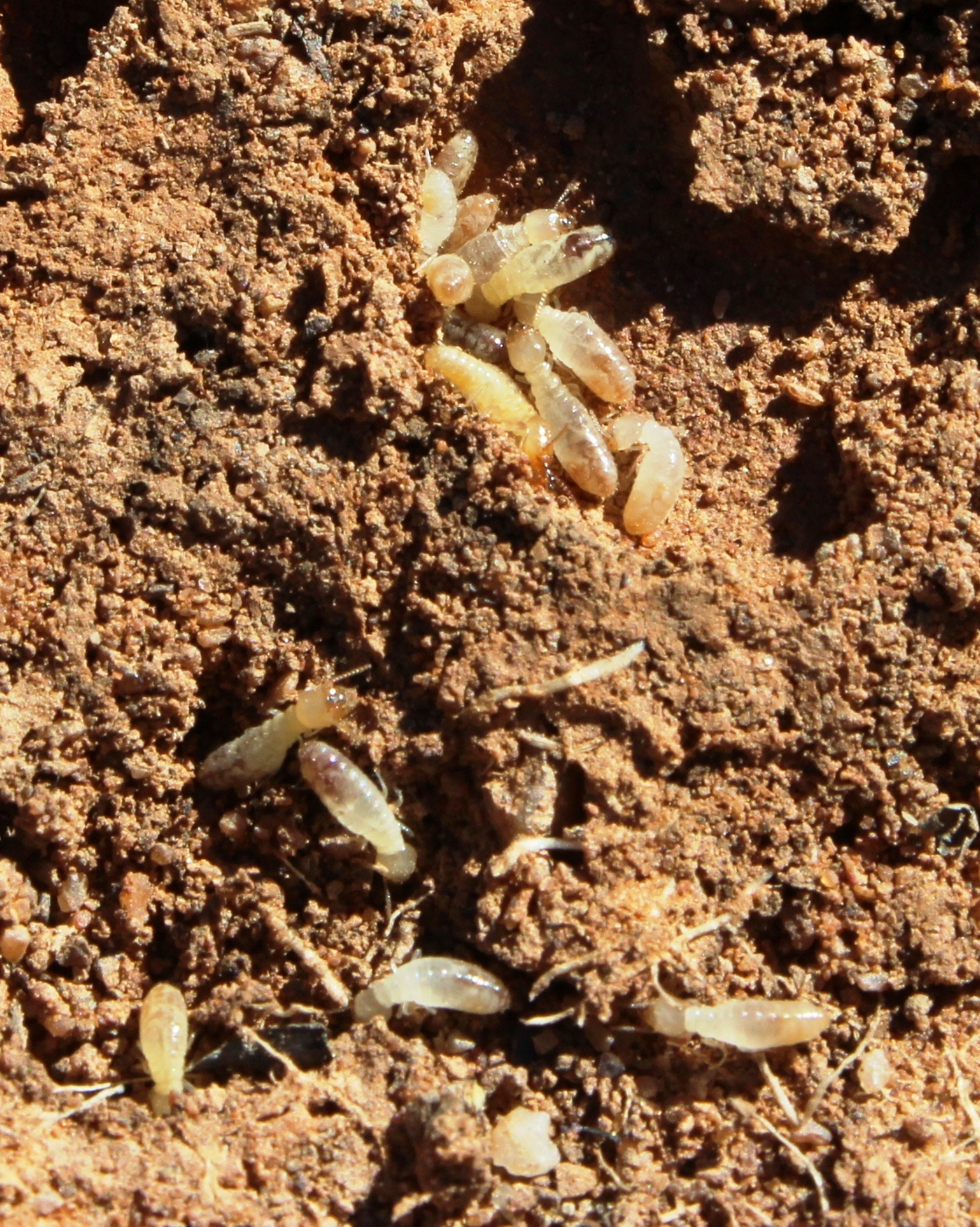

Scientific classification
- Kingdom: Animalia
- Phylum: Arthropoda
- Class: Insecta
- Order: Blattodea
- Infraorder: Isoptera
- Family: Psammotermitidae
- Genus: Psammotermes
- Species: P. allocerus

Binomial name
- Psammotermes allocerus Silvestri, 1908

= Psammotermes allocerus =

Species of termite

Psammotermes allocerus is a sand termite that lives in the deserts of Namibia and neighboring countries. They were thought to be responsible for the creation of fairy circles, until that theory was disproven in 2013.

Psammotermes is essentially a desert-dwelling termite, and seems to replace Anacanthotermes in drier areas. Well-adapted to very dry conditions, it may be found in areas where there is little evidence of other arthropods. The species even inhabits areas where there is no vegetation: in those cases, it is thought to survive on the wind blown accumulation of organic debris. It is also found in the dry regions of the southern African interior that are almost devoid of soil.
