= Trinervitermes rubidus =

Scientific classification
- Domain: Eukaryota
- Kingdom: Animalia
- Phylum: Arthropoda
- Class: Insecta
- Order: Blattodea
- Infraorder: Isoptera
- Family: Termitidae
- Genus: Trinervitermes
- Species: T. rubidus

Binomial name
- Trinervitermes rubidus (Hagen, 1859)

Synonyms
- Termes rubidus Hagen 1859

Species of termite

Trinervitermes rubidus, is a species of mound building termite of the genus Trinervitermes. It is native to Sri Lanka.
