= Trinervitermes biformis =

Scientific classification
- Domain: Eukaryota
- Kingdom: Animalia
- Phylum: Arthropoda
- Class: Insecta
- Order: Blattodea
- Infraorder: Isoptera
- Family: Termitidae
- Genus: Trinervitermes
- Species: T. biformis

Binomial name
- Trinervitermes biformis (Wasmann 1902)

Synonyms
- Eutermes biformis Wasmann 1902; Eutermes heimi Wasmann 1902; Nasutitermes (Trinervitermes) longinotus Snyder, 1934

Species of termite

Trinervitermes biformis, the snouted harvester termite, is a species of mound building termite in the genus Trinervitermes, native to India and Sri Lanka. The type species was described from the Bandarawela area of Sri Lanka. It is a pest of sugarcane and brinjal.
