= Nitropentadecene =

Names
- Preferred IUPAC name (1E)-1-Nitropentadec-1-ene
- Other names (E)-1-nitropentadec-1-ene

Identifiers
CAS Number	53520-53-9
3D model (JSmol)	Interactive image
ChemSpider	26949125
PubChem CID	14753110
UNII	2CGJ6VS9HW
CompTox Dashboard (EPA)	DTXSID301028183
- InChI: InChI=1S/C15H29NO2/c1-2-3-4-5-6-7-8-9-10-11-12-13-14-15-16(17)18/h14-15H,2-13H2,1H3/b15-14+ Key: VXUKZOXLZJQOHU-CCEZHUSRSA-N
- SMILES: CCCCCCCCCCCCC/C=C/[N+](=O)[O-]

Properties
Chemical formula	C_{15}H_{29}NO_{2}
Molar mass	255.402 g·mol^{−1}
log P	6.911
- Except where otherwise noted, data are given for materials in their standard state (at 25 °C [77 °F], 100 kPa). verify (what is ?) Infobox references

Nitropentadecene, or more precisely (E)-1-nitropentadec-1-ene, is a highly toxic unsaturated nitroalkene, the only aliphatic nitro compound known to be synthesized by insects. It is produced by termite soldiers of genus Prorhinotermes (Isoptera, Rhinotermitidae) as a defensive chemical. Nitropentadecene is biosynthesized and stored in one of the exocrine glands, a frontal gland, of termite soldiers, and it is released upon attack of enemy.
