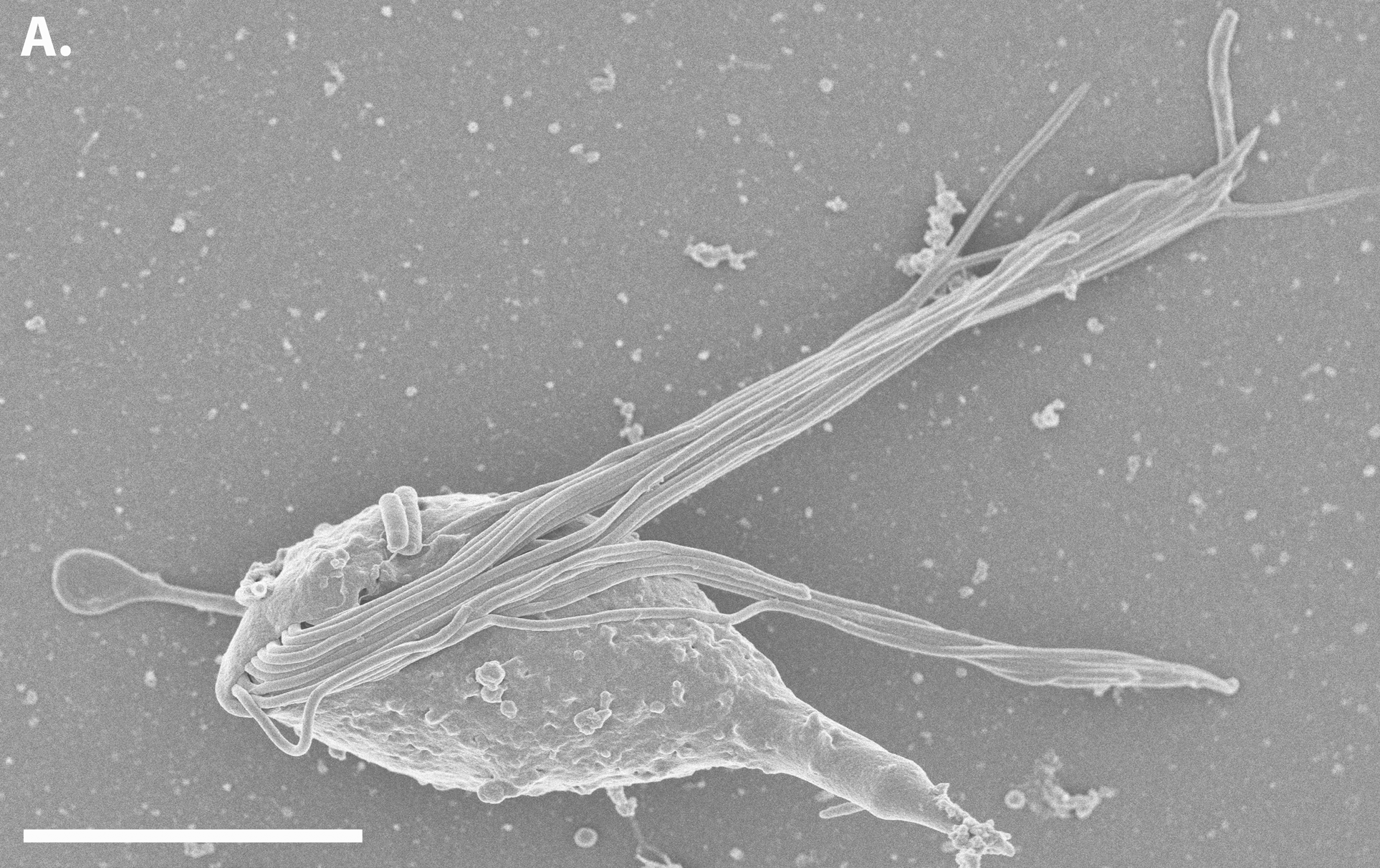

Scientific classification
- Domain: Eukaryota
- Phylum: Metamonada
- Subphylum: Trichozoa
- Clade: Parabasalia
- Class: incertae sedis
- Genus: Cthulhu; James & Keeling, 2012
- Species: C. macrofasciculumque

Binomial name
- Cthulhu macrofasciculumque James & Keeling, 2012

= Cthulhu macrofasciculumque =

Species of excavates

Cthulhu macrofasciculumque is a species of excavates. It lives in the guts of termites.

== Habitat ==
It lives in the hindgut of Prorhinotermes simplex (Cuban subterranean termite) and helps them to digest wood.

== Appearance ==
The microbe's length is about a fifth of the width of a human hair, in the range of 10 to 20 μm, and it has around 20 flagella. Cthylla is slightly smaller, with only five flagella.

== Naming ==
The octopus-like movements and appearance of Cthulhu macrofasciculumque (as well as another protist that assists in the digestion of wood by termites) reminded researcher Erick James of Cthulhu, H. P. Lovecraft's fictional cosmic entity. James named the other protist, Cthylla microfasciculumque, after Cthulhu's "daughter" Cthylla.

== See also ==
- Eastern subterranean termite
