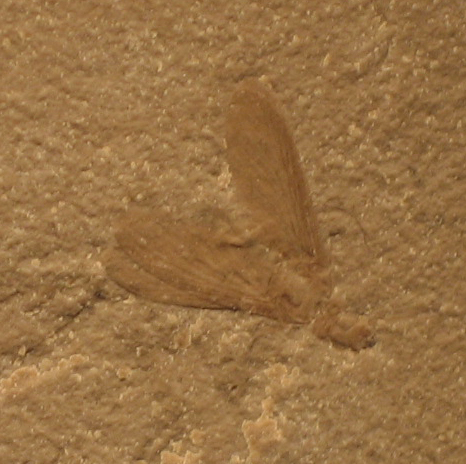
- Meiatermes bertrani fossil alate in Cosmocaixa, Barcelona.

Scientific classification
- Domain: Eukaryota
- Kingdom: Animalia
- Phylum: Arthropoda
- Class: Insecta
- Order: Blattodea
- Infraorder: Isoptera
- Family: Hodotermitidae
- Genus: †Meiatermes; Lacasa-Ruiz & Martinez-Declos 1986

Species
- †Meiatermes araripena; †Meiatermes bertrani

= Meiatermes =

Extinct genus of termites

The Meiatermes is an extinct genus of termites that belonged to the Hodotermitidae. Their fossils have been obtained from early Cretaceous deposits in Brazil and Spain.
