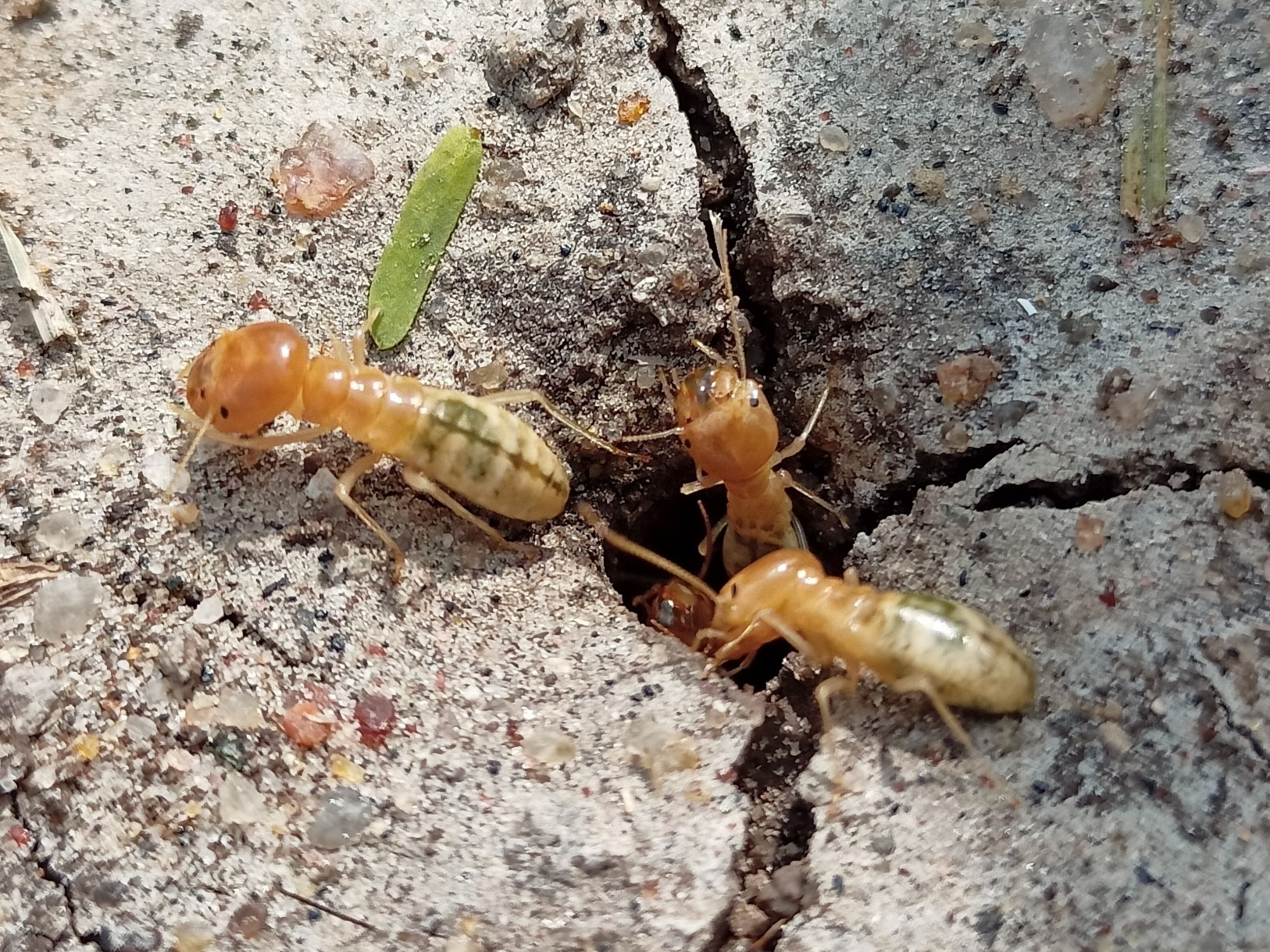
- Anacanthotermes viarum

Scientific classification
- Domain: Eukaryota
- Kingdom: Animalia
- Phylum: Arthropoda
- Class: Insecta
- Order: Blattodea
- Infraorder: Isoptera
- Family: Hodotermitidae
- Genus: Anacanthotermes; Jacobson 1905

= Anacanthotermes =

Genus of termites

Anacanthotermes is an Old World genus of termites in the Hodotermitidae. They are found in deserts and semideserts of North Africa, the Middle East and Southwest Asia, including Baluchistan and southern India. Wings of the alates are glabrous and lack the microstructures like micrasters, microsetae or rods found in more modern Isoptera. In the driest and most arid locations in Africa it is generally replaced by Psammotermes.

== Species ==
The genus contains some 13 species:

- A. ahngerianus (Jacobson)
- A. baeckmannianus (Vasiljev)
- A. baluchistanicus Akhtar, 1974
- A. iranicus Ravan et al., 1994
- A. macrocephalus (Desneux, 1906)
- A. murgabicus (Vasiljev)
- A. ochraceus (Burmeister)
- A. saudiensis Chhotani, et al., 1982
- A. septentrionalis (Jacobson)
- A. turkestanicus (Jacobson)
- A. ubachi (Navas)
- A. vagans (Hagen, 1858)
- A. viarum (König, 1779)
