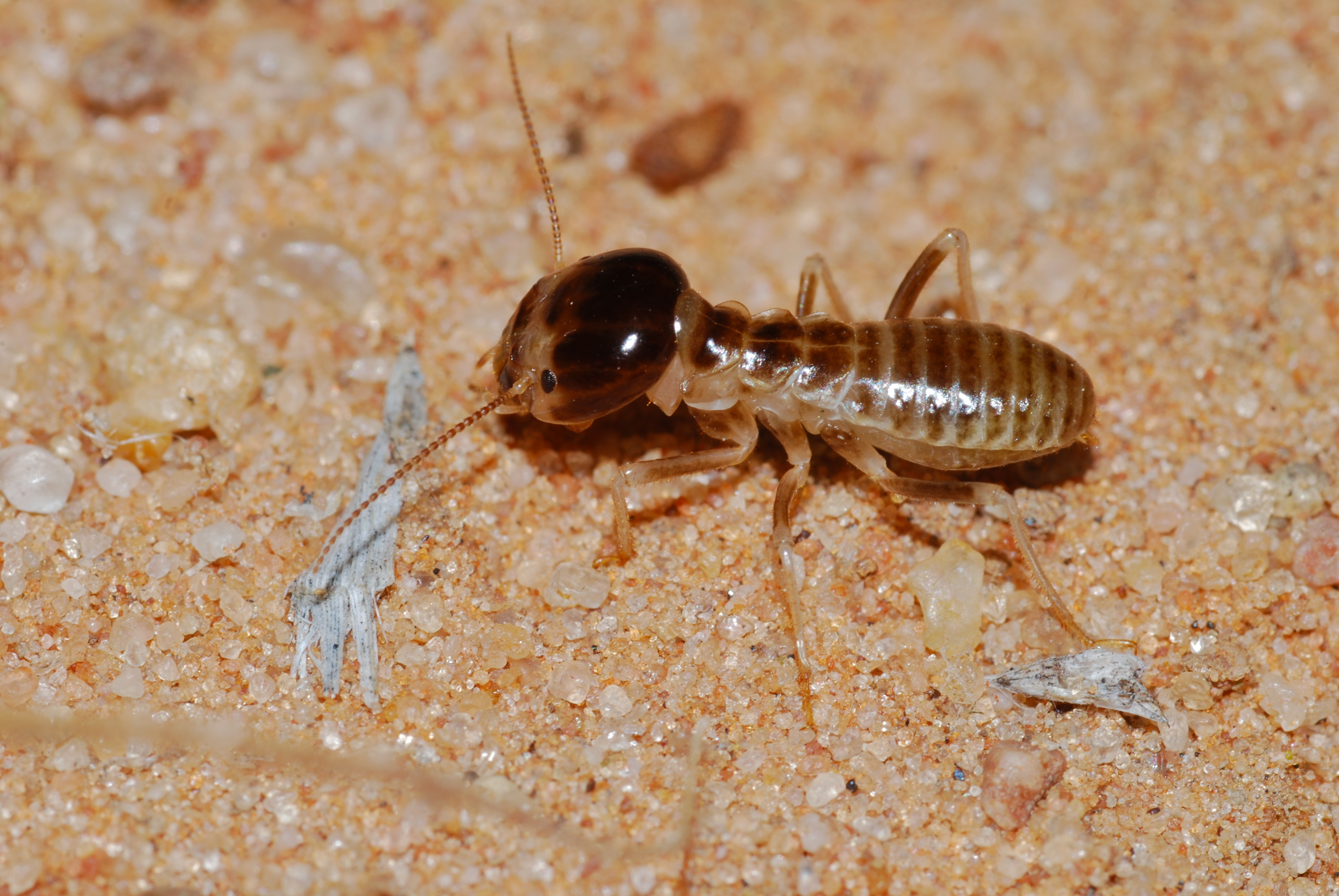

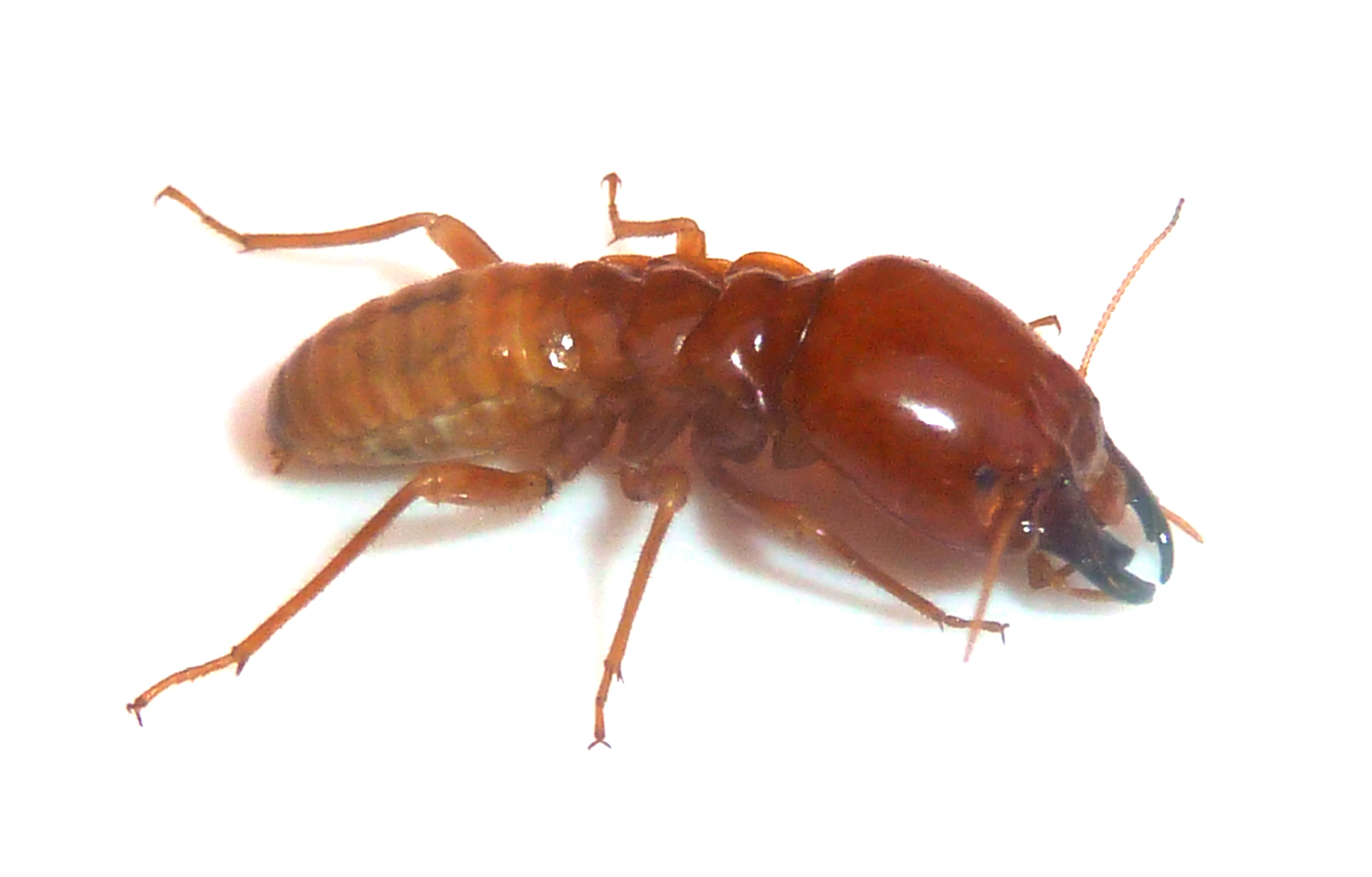
- H. mossambicus worker and soldier

Scientific classification
- Kingdom: Animalia
- Phylum: Arthropoda
- Clade: Pancrustacea
- Class: Insecta
- Order: Blattodea
- Infraorder: Isoptera
- Clade: Teletisoptera
- Family: Hodotermitidae; Desneux, 1904

Genera
- Anacanthotermes Jacobson 1905; †Carinatermes Krishna & Grimaldi 2000; Hodotermes Hagen 1853; †Jitermes Ren 1995; †Meiatermes Lacasa-Ruiz & Martinez-Declos 1986; Microhodotermes Sjöstedt 1926; †Parotermes Scudder 1883; †Ulmeriella Meunier 1919; †Valditermes Jarzembowski 1981; †Yanjingtermes Ren 1995; †Yongdingia Ren 1995

= Hodotermitidae =

Hodotermitidae Temporal range: Early Cretaceous to present

Family of termites

The Hodotermitidae (from Greek ὁδός (hodós), travelling; Latin termes, woodworm) are a basal Old World family of termites known as the harvester termites. They are distinguished by the serrated inner edge of their mandibles, and their functional compound eyes which are present in all castes. They forage for grass at night and during daylight hours, and the pigmented workers are often observed outside the nest. Their range includes the deserts and savannas of Africa, the Middle East, and Southwest Asia. Their English name refers to their habit of collecting grass, which is not unique to the family however.

== General ==
The family consists of three extant genera and some 18 or 19 species. Anacanthotermes is found in deserts and semideserts of North Africa, the Middle East, and Southwest Asia, including Baluchistan and southern India. Hodotermes has a vast range from Palaearctic North Africa, through the East African savannas to the karroid regions of southern Africa. Microhodotermes is a genus of desert specialists in the Namib, Kalahari, and Karoo, where their ranges overlap with Hodotermes.

Although they were once considered a part of Archotermopsidae, they are now generally viewed as their own distinct family which merely retain plesiomorphies with the other basal Isoptera.

== Nests ==
They nest by excavating in the soil, unlike the Archotermopsidae and Kalotermitidae. In the case of Hodotermes mossambicus, the diffuse subterranean system of spherical hives may be located from near the surface to more than 6 m deep. The hives may be 60 cm wide and are interconnected by galleries. Loose particles of excavated soil are brought to the surface and dumped at various points around the nest. Colonies of Microhodotermes viator produce initially small, conical mounds on soil with sufficient clay content. Sociotomy, or the mass movement of representatives of all castes in a colony in order to found a new colony, is unknown in Hodotermitidae.

== Reproduction ==
Soon after rain showers, swarms of flying termites, alates or winged reproductives, emerge from their underground nests during summer evenings. When sufficiently distant from the parent nest, they land, shrug off their wings, and scout about for a mate. The pair then excavates a burrow to start a new colony. A week after swarming, the female lays her first eggs, which are tended by the couple, a task soon taken over by the maturing workers. After some four months, the nest is sufficiently developed to send foraging workers to the surface. For the next few years, most of the eggs develop into workers and a small number of soldiers. When the nest is sufficiently large, winged reproductives again develop.

== Diet and feeding ==
The workers of M. viator collect mostly woody material, with Pteronia and vygie species being favoured. To the contrary, the diet of H. mossambicus consists primarily of ripe and/or frost- or drought-killed grass, though tree and shrub material is consumed to a lesser degree. In a stable isotope study of H. mossambicus, the grass component was found to constitute upwards of 94% of their food intake. In this species, the sixth instar larvae digest and distribute food within the colony by means of stomodeal trophallaxis. The mutual feeding also reinforces the colony's integrity, as the feeders discriminate against individuals with unfamiliar intestinal microbiota.

== Predators ==
Harvester termites form the main component in the diet of the diurnal bat-eared fox in east and southern Africa. For this unusual diet, these foxes have 48 small teeth compared to the 42 teeth of all other dogs. They also have large ears to hear the insects in their underground chambers, before they are dug up. Similarly, the nocturnal fennec fox procures termites by digging. Though the aardwolf is a specialized predator of certain Trinervitermes, they may assume a partially diurnal habit in winter to obtain harvester termites. Widespread foraging and burrowing activities of aardvarks are associated with heuweltjies inhabited by M. viator.

== Economic impact ==
They can deplete grass in pastures and contribute to soil erosion, but are less effective when grasslands are not overgrazed or disturbed. Over the long term, however, their decomposing and recycling of plant material contribute to soil fertility and the global cycling of carbon, nitrogen, and other elements.
