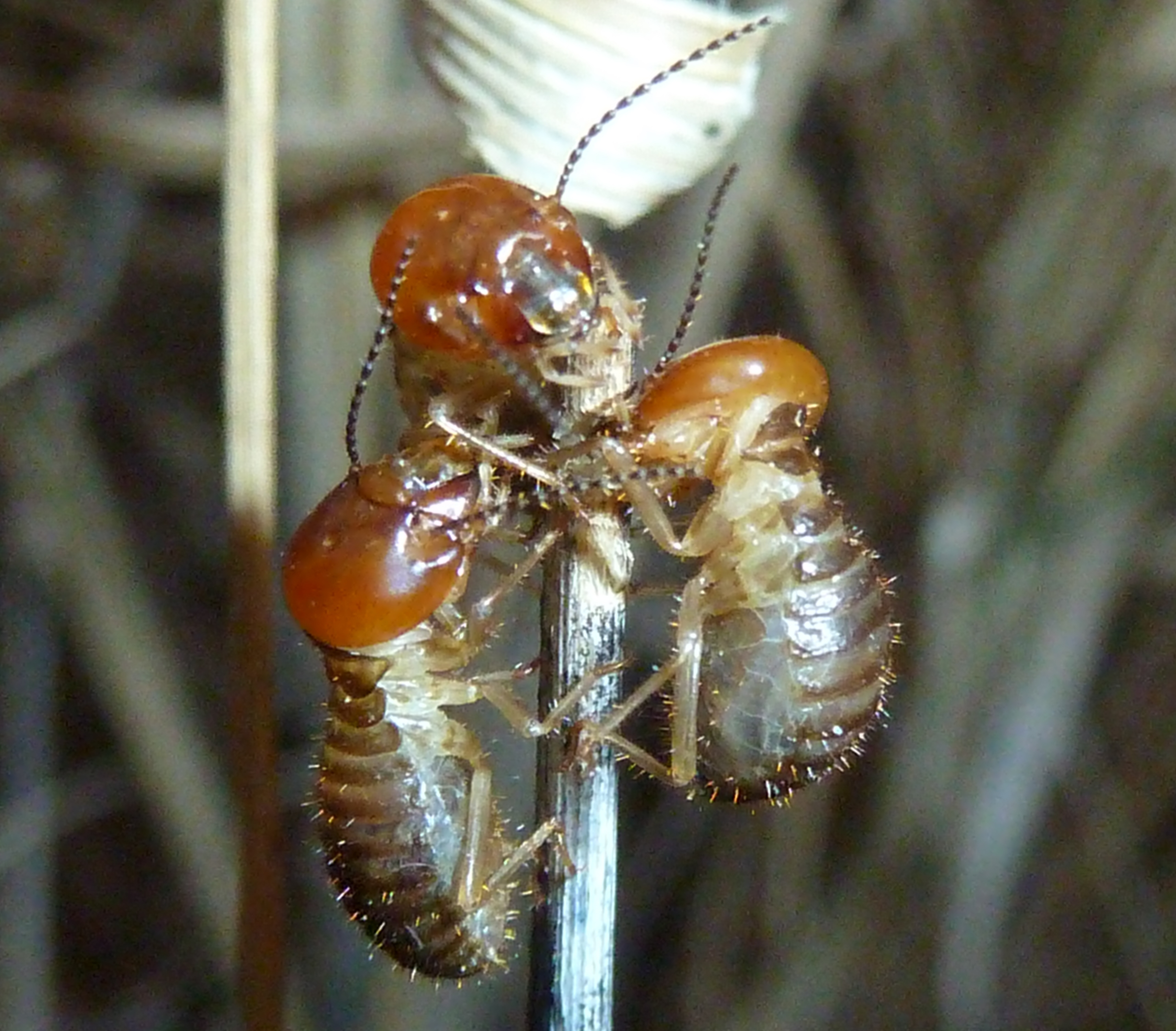

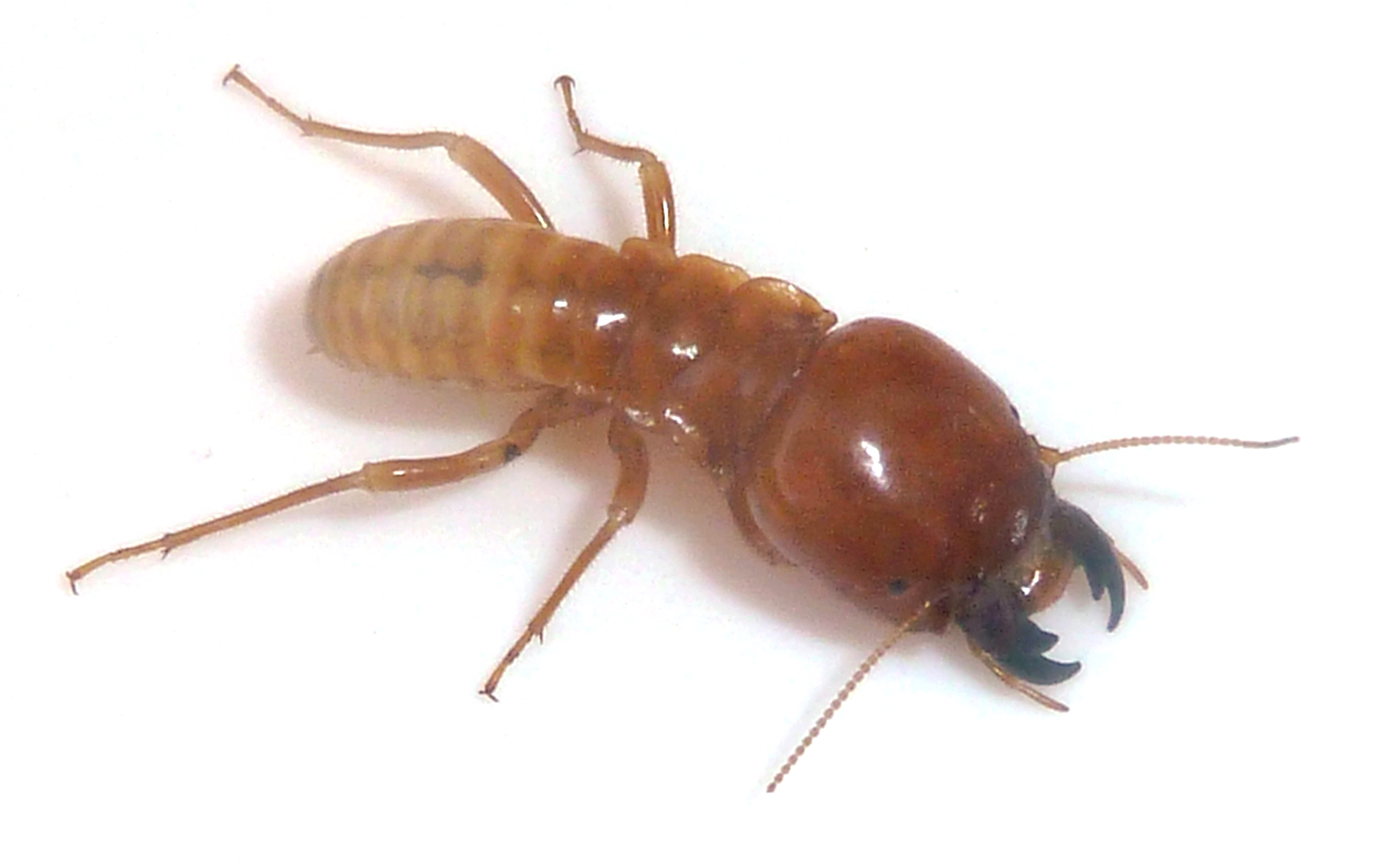

Scientific classification
- Kingdom: Animalia
- Phylum: Arthropoda
- Class: Insecta
- Order: Blattodea
- Infraorder: Isoptera
- Family: Hodotermitidae
- Genus: Hodotermes
- Species: H. mossambicus

Binomial name
- Hodotermes mossambicus (Hagen, 1853)

= Hodotermes mossambicus =

Species of termite

Hodotermes mossambicus, the Northern harvester termite and Mozambique harvester termite, is a species of termite belonging to the family Hodotermitidae. It was first described by Hermann August Hagen in 1853. It is an ecologically important and widespread termite species found in the savannas and semi-arid regions of Africa. They play a significant role in nutrient cycling and soil health, but their foraging habits can make them an agricultural pest. The species found throughout much of sub-Saharan Africa, including regions like Botswana, Namibia, South Africa, and Zimbabwe.
