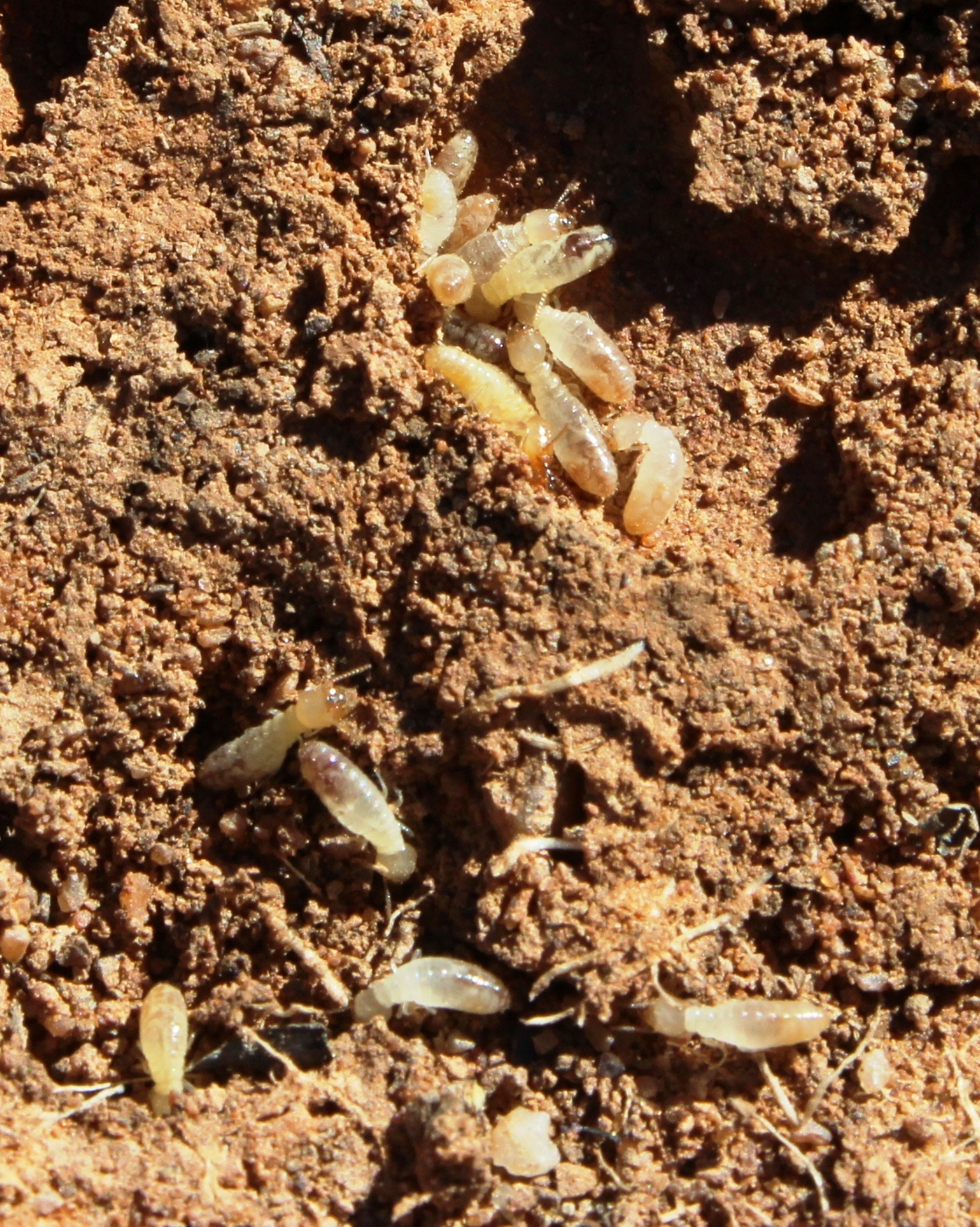
- Psammotermes allocerus

Scientific classification
- Kingdom: Animalia
- Phylum: Arthropoda
- Clade: Pancrustacea
- Class: Insecta
- Order: Blattodea
- Infraorder: Isoptera
- Family: Psammotermitidae; Hellemans et al., 2024

Subfamilies
- Psammotermitinae; Prorhinotermitinae

= Psammotermitidae =

Subfamily of termites

Psammotermitidae are a family of termites consisting of the regrouped subfamilies Psammotermitinae and Prorhinotermitinae, which were formerly nested within Rhinotermitidae. The subfamilies are monogeneric and represented by their respective genera, Psammotermes and Prorhinotermes.
