= Prorhinotermes =

Scientific classification
- Kingdom: Animalia
- Phylum: Arthropoda
- Clade: Pancrustacea
- Class: Insecta
- Order: Blattodea
- Infraorder: Isoptera
- Family: Psammotermitidae
- Genus: Prorhinotermes; Silvestri, 1909

Genus of termites

Prorhinotermes is a genus of termites belonging to the subfamily Prorhinotermitinae, which is nested in the family Psammotermitidae.

The species of this genus are found in Malesia and Australia.

Phorhinotermes lacks a true worker caste and it has a linear ontogenetical pathway.

Species:

- Prorhinotermes canalifrons (Sjöstedt, 1904)
- Prorhinotermes flavus (Bugnion & Popoff, 1910)
- Prorhinotermes hainanensis X.u.Ping, 1989
- Prorhinotermes inopinatus Silvestri, 1909
- Prorhinotermes molinoi Snyder, 1924
- Prorhinotermes oceanicus (Wasmann, 1902)
- Prorhinotermes ponapensis (Oshima, 1917)
- Prorhinotermes rugifer Kemner, 1931
- Prorhinotermes simplex (Hagen, 1858)
- Prorhinotermes spectabilis X.u.Ping, 1989
- Prorhinotermes xishaensis Li & Tsai, 1976
