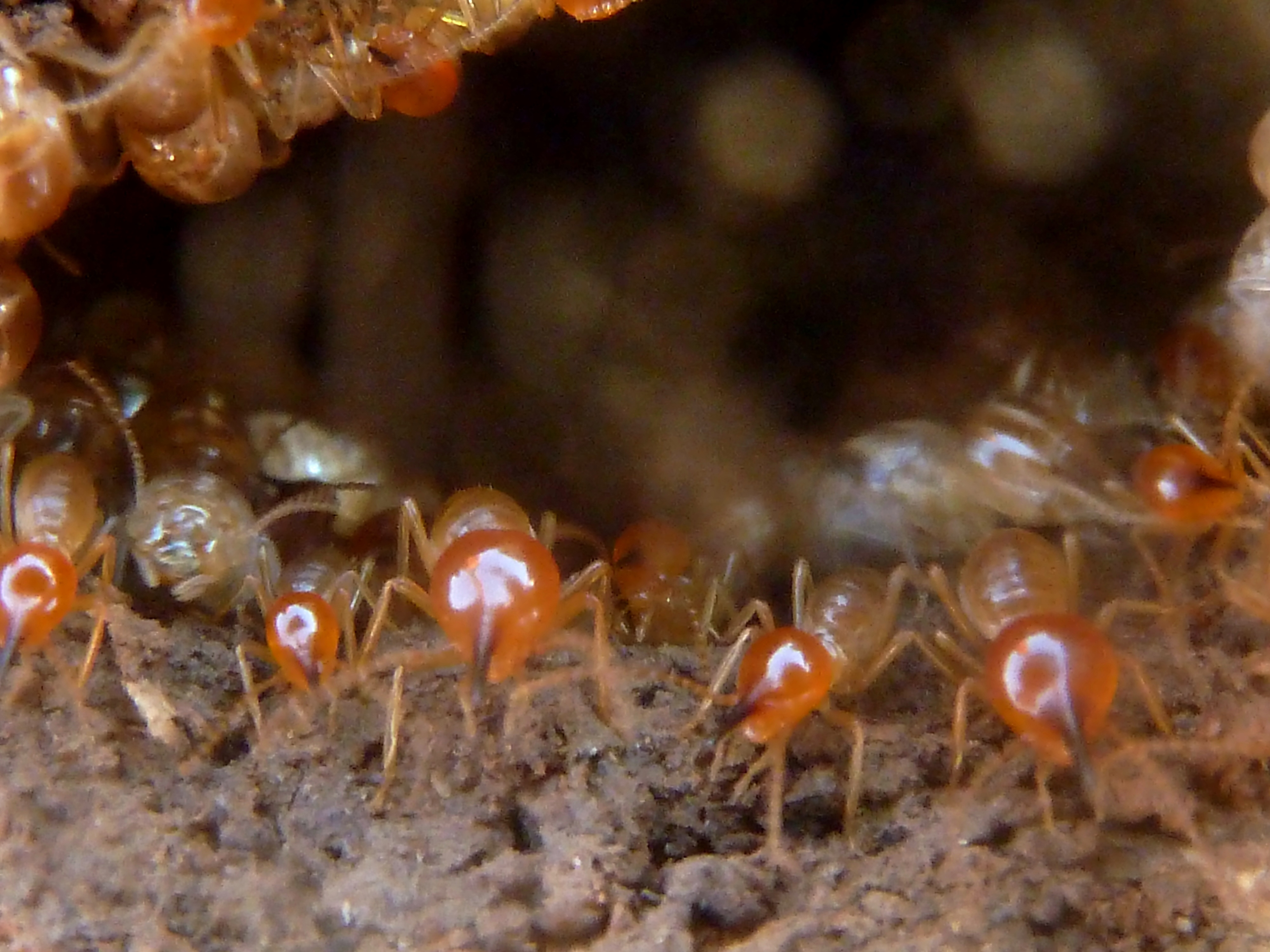

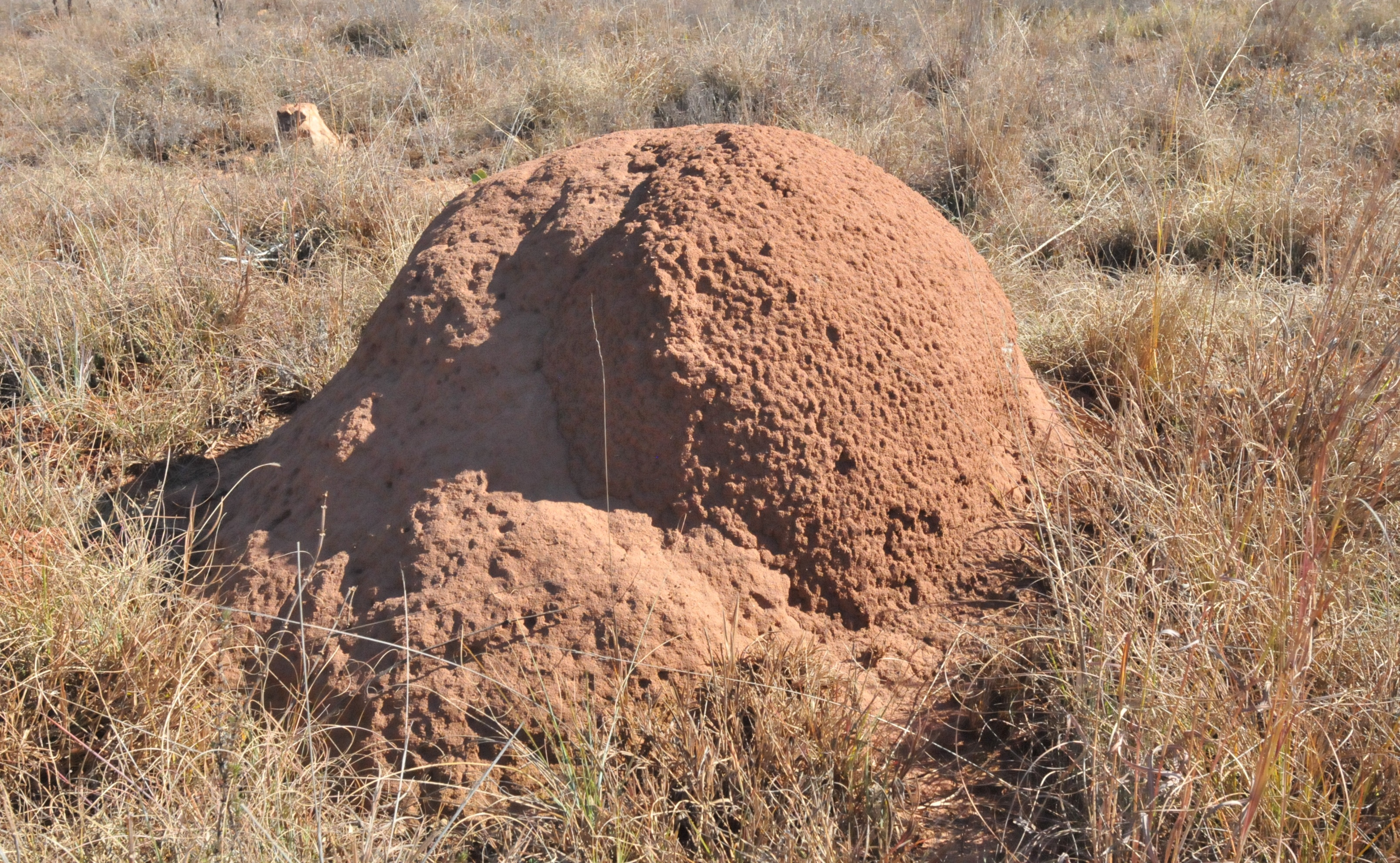
- Soldiers defending mound builders, and the domed mound of T. trinervoides

Scientific classification
- Kingdom: Animalia
- Phylum: Arthropoda
- Clade: Pancrustacea
- Class: Insecta
- Order: Blattodea
- Infraorder: Isoptera
- Family: Termitidae
- Subfamily: Nasutitermitinae
- Genus: Trinervitermes; Holmgren, 1912

= Trinervitermes =

Genus of termites

Trinervitermes is a termite genus belonging to family Termitidae. Members are native to the Old World. They inhabit grasslands and store grass in their nests or mounds, just below the ground surface. Their grass-collecting activities are mainly nocturnal. The soldier caste has atrophied mandibles and a fontanelle squirt gun on the frons. Diterpenes and monoterpenes are released to deter ants and smaller predators, but these are not effective against larger mammalian predators. Due to the snout on the head of soldiers and their grass-collecting habits, they are known as snouted harvester termites.

== Species ==
Species include:

- Trinervitermes biformis (Wasmann, 1902) – India and Sri Lanka
- Trinervitermes dispar (Sjöstedt) – East Africa to South Africa
- Trinervitermes rapulum (Sjöstedt) – East Africa to southern Africa
- Trinervitermes rhodesiensis (Sjöstedt) – East Africa to southern Africa
- Trinervitermes trinervoides (Sjöstedt, 1911) – South Africa, Namibia, Zimbabwe and Mozambique
- Trinervitermes rubidus (Hagen, 1859) – Sri Lanka
