= Anima =

Anima may refer to:

== Arts, entertainment and media ==
=== Fictional entities ===
- Anima, in the Spira world in Final Fantasy games
- Anima, in the Fire Emblem game series
- Anima (comics), a DC Comics character

=== Film ===
- Anima – Symphonie phantastique, a 1981 Austrian drama film
- Anima (2003 film), an American short film
- Ánima, a 2018 Mexican film directed by Kuno Becker
- Anima, a 1998 film with George Bartenieff
- Anima (2019 film), a short film directed by Paul Thomas Anderson
- Anima (2026 film), an American road comedy film

=== Literature ===
- Anima, a 1972 novel by Eileen-Marie Duell Buchanan
- Anima: Age of the Robots, a comic series by Johnny Tay
- +Anima, a 2001 manga series by Natsumi Mukai
- Neon Genesis Evangelion: Anima, a Japanese light novel series

=== Music ===
==== Performers ====
- Anima (chorus), an American children's chorus
- Anima (ensemble), a Brazilian chamber music ensemble
- Aenima (band), a Portuguese rock band
- Anima Sound System, a Hungarian electronic band

==== Recordings ====
- Anima (Nightmare album), 2006
- Anima (Thom Yorke album), 2019
- Anima (Vladislav Delay album), 2001
- anima, a 2020 album by Daoko
- Anima, a 2023 EP by Pendulum
- Anima, a 1974 album by Riccardo Cocciante
- "Anima", a 2020 single by Reona
- "Anima", a 2015 single by Romina Falconi
- Ænima, a 1996 album by Tool
- ANIMA, a 2016 maxi-single by sukekiyo

=== Other uses in arts, entertainment and media ===
- Anima (music term), a tempo and style marking in music
- Anima (role-playing game)
- Anima, or Her Soul, an 1898 play by Amelia Pincherle Rosselli

== Businesses and organizations ==
- Anima (organization), Danish animal-rights organization
- Ánima (company), a Mexican animation studio
- Anima (film company), a Filipino entertainment production company

== People ==
- Anima Anandkumar (fl. from 2009), Indian-American scientist
- Anima Choudhury (born 1953), singer from India
- Anima Patil-Sabale (fl. from 2012), Indian engineer
- Anima Roy (fl. from 2009), Bangladeshi academic and Rabindra Sangeet singer
- Anima Wilson (fl. 2013), Ghanaian politician

== Religion and philosophy ==
- Psyche (psychology), Latinized to anima in medieval psychology
- Anima and animus, a syzygy of dualistic, Jungian archetypes

== Other uses ==
- Anima, Togo, a village
- Gum anima, or anima, a kind of gum or resin
- Córdoba International Animation Festival – ANIMA, in Argentina
- Anima, crowd-animation software developed by AXYZ and acquired by Chaos

== See also ==
- Anima Mundi (disambiguation)
- Animas (disambiguation)
- Anema (disambiguation)
- Anemia (disambiguation)
- Las Animas (disambiguation)
- Animism, the belief that objects, places, and creatures all possess a distinct spiritual essence
- Anime, hand-drawn and computer-generated animation originating from Japan
- Animé, sap of Hymenaea courbaril
- Enema, an injection of fluid into the lower bowel
- Soul, the non-material essence of a person
  - On the Soul (De anima), Aristotle's treatise on the soul
- Spirit (animating force)
- Vitalism
