= Mundi (disambiguation) =

Mundi is a city and tehsil in the Nimar region of Madhya Pradesh state in India.

Mundi may also refer to:

- Berla Mundi, a Ghanaian TV presenter
- Mündi, a village in Paide municipality, Järva County, Estonia
- Mundi, Kapurthala, a village in Kapurthala district of Punjab State, India
- Mundi Area, an in Madhya Pradesh state of central India with the city Mundi as administrative capital
- Mundi Mundi, an historic pastoral lease and various entities associated with Mundi Mundi Plain, New South Wales, Australia

== See also ==
- Anima Mundi (disambiguation)
- Coati Mundi (disambiguation)
- Ki-Adi-Mundi, a character in Star Wars
- Mundi Kasu, village in Shahkot, Jalandhar district of Punjab state, India
- Regina Mundi (disambiguation)
- Rosa Mundi (disambiguation)
- Salvator Mundi, Latin for "saviour of the world"
