= Janam Raj =

Indian singer and composer (1965–2023)

- জানম ৰাজ
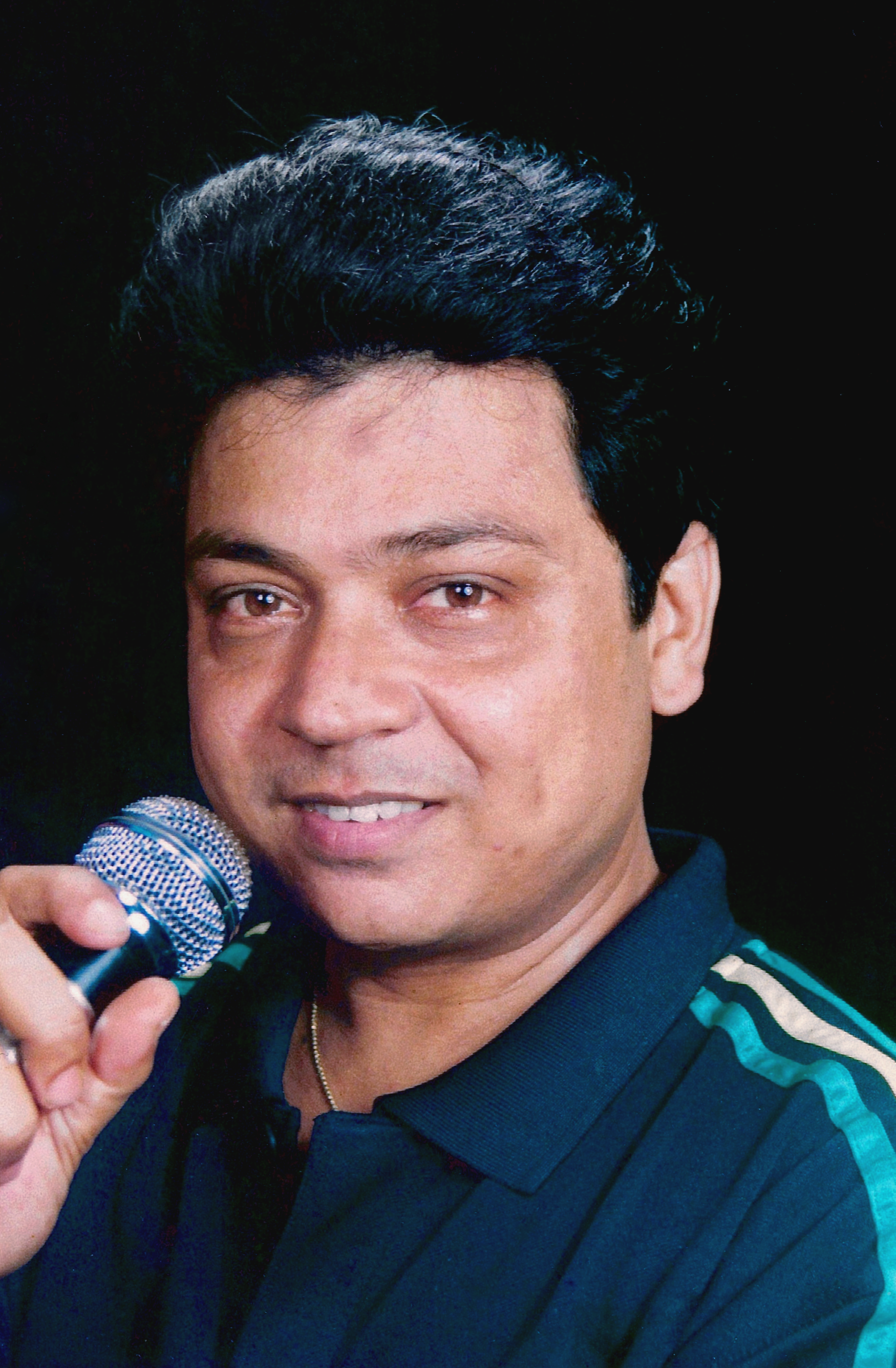
- Raj in 2003
- Pronunciation: jaanam raj
- Born: Mohendra Deka; 1 March 1965; Bilasipara, Dhubri district, Assam, India
- Died: 29 April 2023 (aged 58); Guwahati, Assam, India
- Education: Arya Vidyapeeth College (BSc & BA); Bhatkhande Sanskriti Vishwavidyalaya (BMus); JB Law College (LLB)
- Occupations: Singer; Composer; Advocate; Lyricist
- Spouse: Minu Baruah (m. 2009)
- Children: Rhythm Kashyap
- Parents: Harendra Chandra Deka (father); Bimala Deka (mother)
- Musical career
- Genres: Bhajan; Ghazal; Pop Music; Rock Music; Indian folk music
- Instruments: Vocals; Harmonium; Tanpura
- Years active: 1996–2023
- Labels: Rhythm Music India; Saregama; Angel Digital

Signature
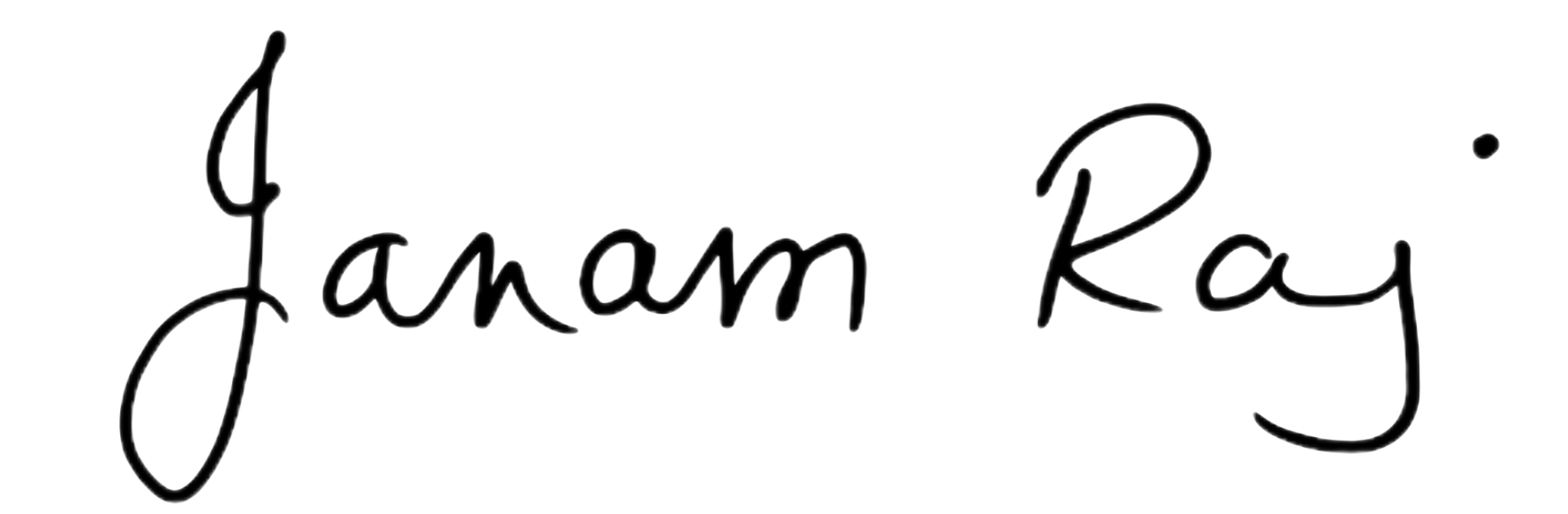

Mohendra Deka (1 March 1965 – 29 April 2023), known professionally as Janam Raj (Note: While his name is pronounced with a double 'A' (Jaanam) in all languages (like in Assamese: জানম and in Hindi: जानम), he chose to spell it with a single 'A' (Janam) in English, which was his preferred stylisation. All of his music contracts, songs, and official records use this single-A spelling (Janam) but it has to be pronounced as /Jaa-nam/. His name is of Urdu origin and means darling .), was an Indian singer, composer, lyricist and an advocate from Assam. He released albums and songs from the late 1990s until the early 2020s, and recorded for All India Radio and Doordarshan as a B-High grade artist for Bhajan and Ghazal. He practiced as an advocate at the Gauhati High Court from 2002 until his death in 2023. He sang in several Indian languages, including Assamese, Hindi, Bengali, Punjabi, Marathi, Rajasthani, and Sanskrit, and performed bhajans and ghazals and chanted mantras.

Born in Bilasipara, he was the youngest son of Harendra Chandra Deka and Bimala Deka. He earned B.Sc. and B.A. degrees from Arya Vidyapeeth College, a B.Mus. degree from Bhatkhande Sanskriti Vishwavidyalaya in 1988, and later an LL.B. from J.B. Law College in 2002. His ghazals and bhajans were broadcast on All India Radio and Doordarshan, respectively.

== Early life, family and education ==
Janam Raj was born on 1 March 1965 in Bilasipara, Dhubri District, Assam, to parents Harendra Chandra Deka and Bimala Deka. His father was a businessman and his mother was a teacher, and both were music lovers. His elder sister, Renu Chowdhury, was a playback singer in Assamese films, while her husband, Bijoy Chowdhury, was a film editor who worked on several Hindi films directed by Shakti Samanta, including Aradhana, Kati Patang, and An Evening in Paris.

=== Introduction to music and education ===
Raj began his musical training during childhood in Bilasipara and was influenced by folk singer Pratima Barua Pandey after meeting her. His father arranged for Guru Sanatan Das of Alipur to teach him, and he began formal training in classical music at the age of five, studying with Das for ten years.

He afterward received advanced classical music training from Pandit Santanu Biswas. He completed a Bachelor of Music at Bhatkhande Sanskriti Vishwavidyalaya, Lucknow in 1988. In addition to his musical education, he earned a B.Sc. and a B.A. from Arya Vidyapeeth College in Guwahati, and later obtained an LL.B. from J.B. Law College, Guwahati, in 2002.

== Career ==
=== Music ===
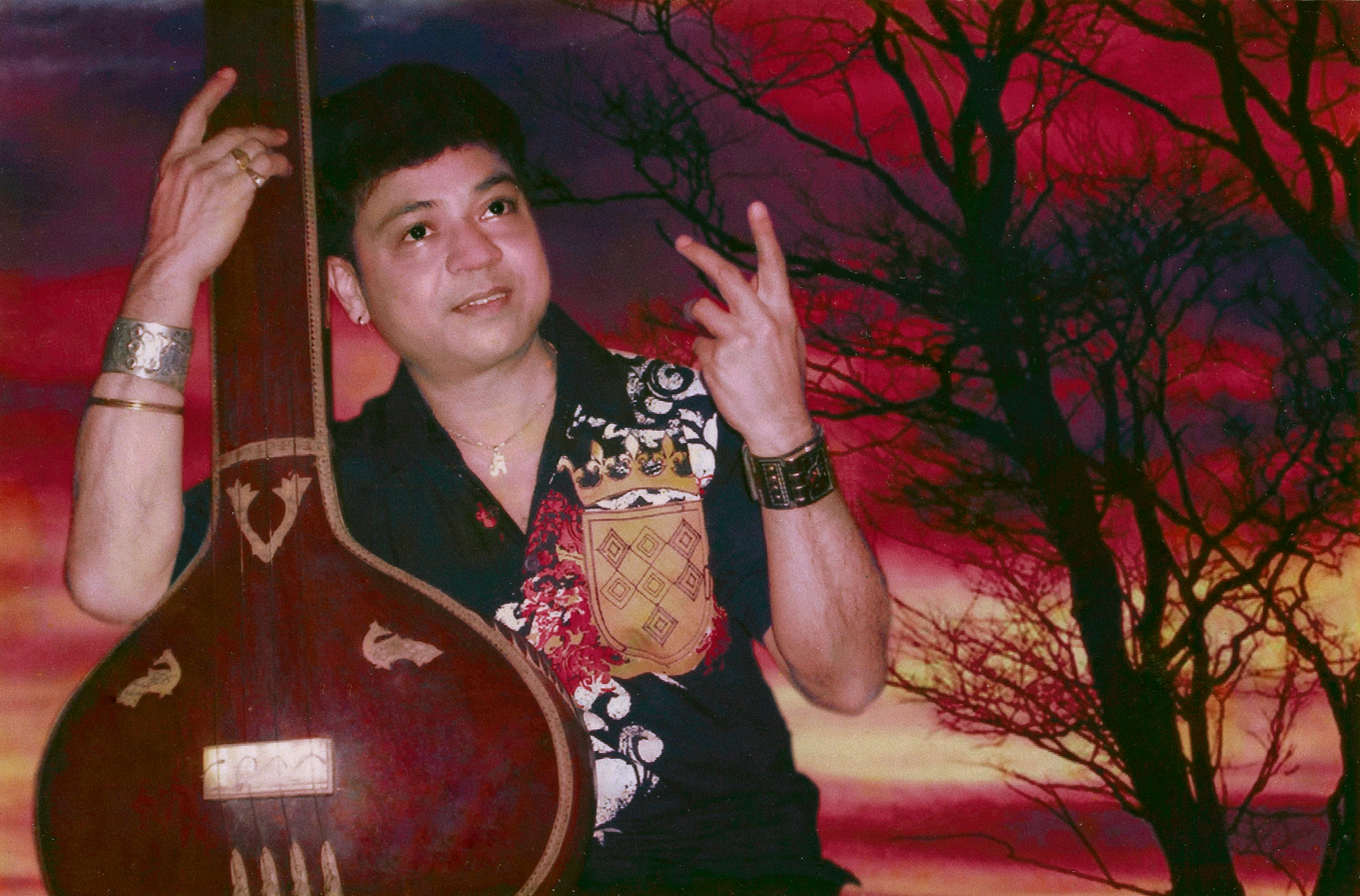
Studio portrait of Raj with Tanpura

==== Early years ====
In 1996, Janam Raj moved to Mumbai for advanced training in classical music and modern singing under playback singer Suresh Wadkar. During this period, he performed Gita-Stuti at Shanmukhananda Hall in Mumbai. Bhupen Hazarika initially assumed that Raj was a Marathi singer because of his Sanskrit pronunciation and addressed him in Marathi, before learning that he was from Assam. He performed at music programmes in several Indian cities, including Kolkata, Jaipur and Jaisalmer.

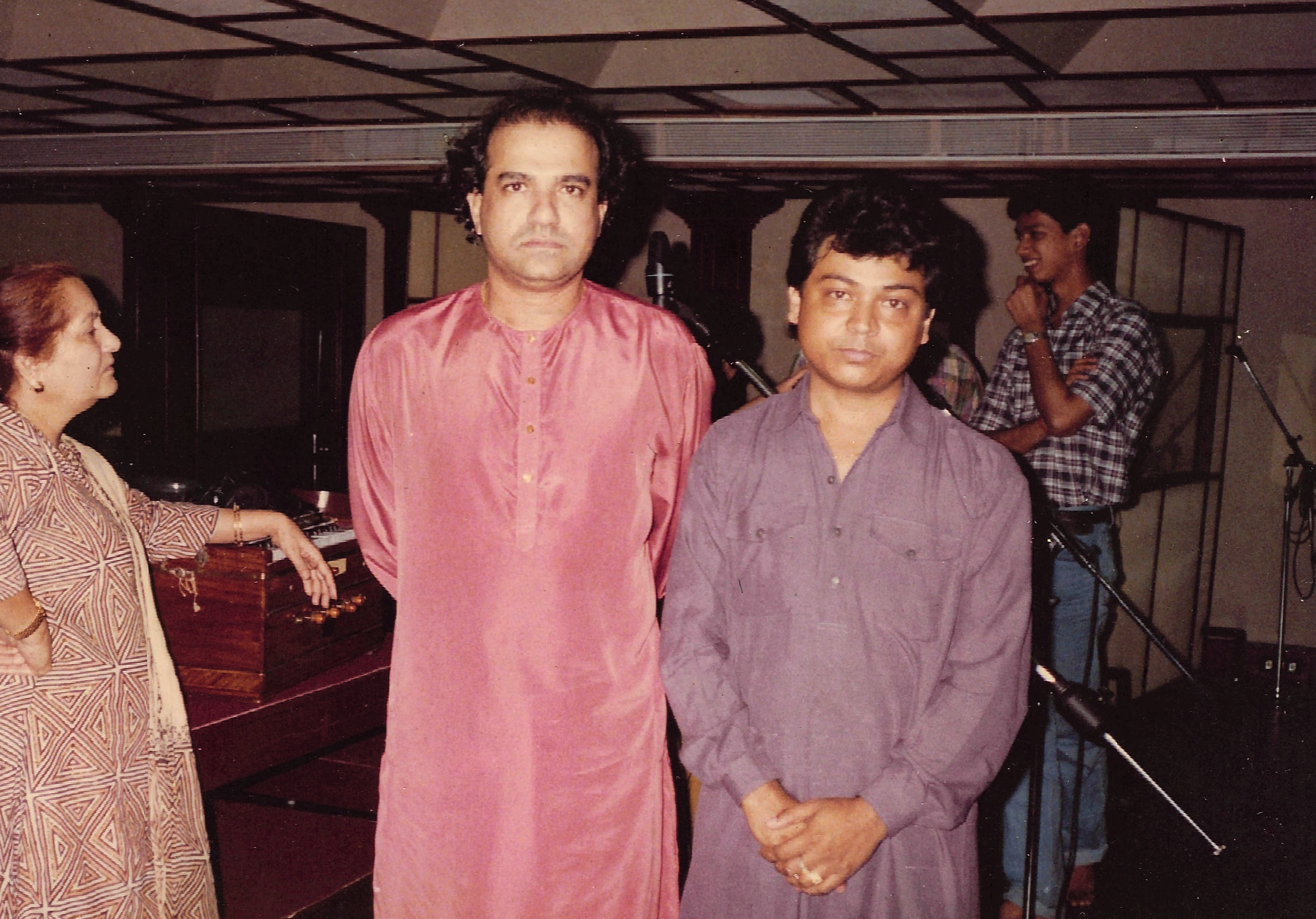
Raj with Suresh Wadkar in Mumbai, 1996

==== Breakthrough and recognition ====
In 1998, he released his debut Assamese album, Premanjali. In 2004, he sang the track "Mon Kiyo Chanchal" with playback singer Usha Uthup for the album Rimjhim and another track "Priya Anjana" for a television serial. That year, he was the music director for the television serial Preyoshi. In February 2005, he received the Best Music Director award at Jyotirupa-Oil India Joint Media Awards for the serial. The award was presented by Assamese actor Biju Phukan.

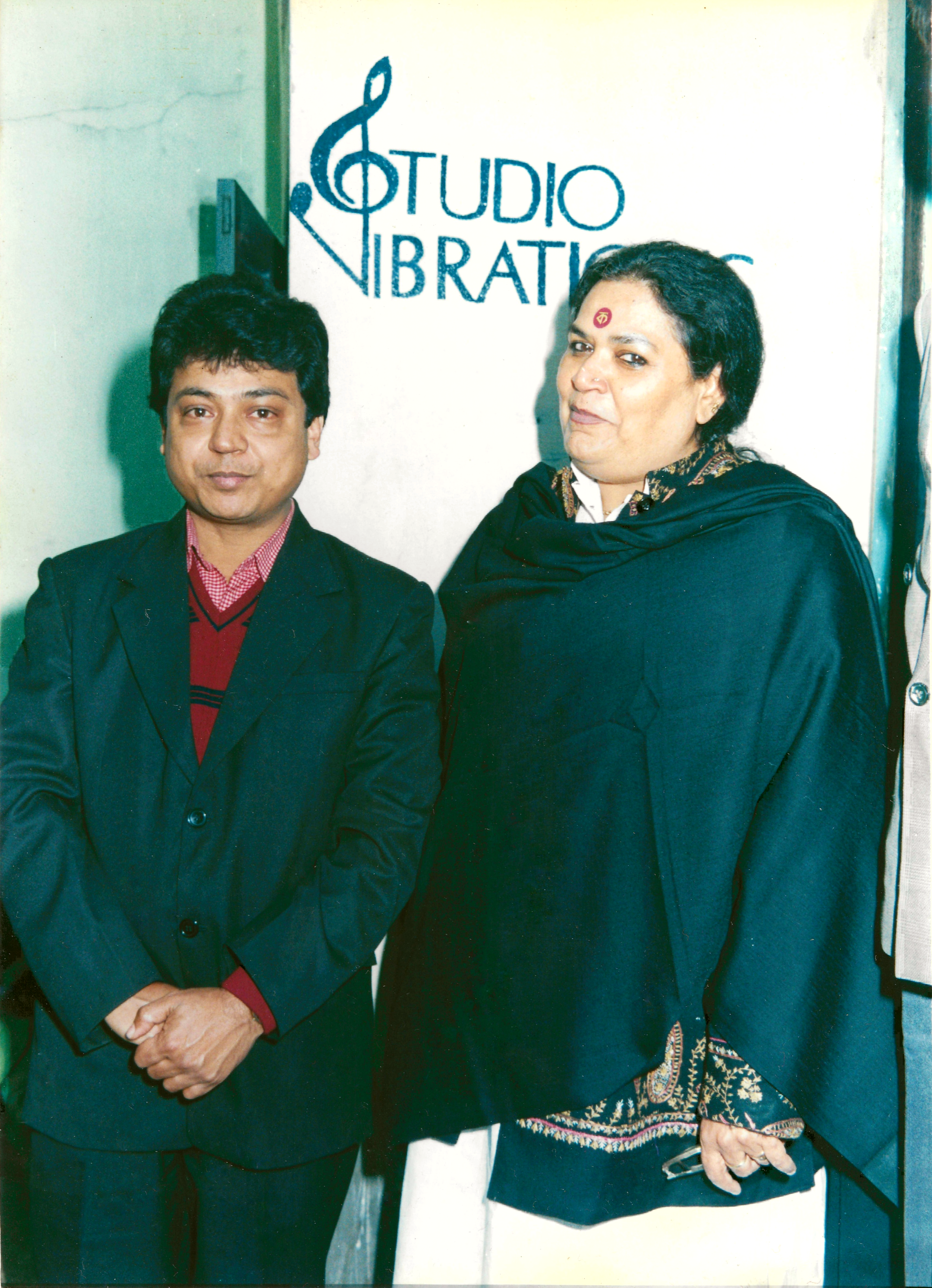
Raj with Usha Uthup in Kolkata, January 2004

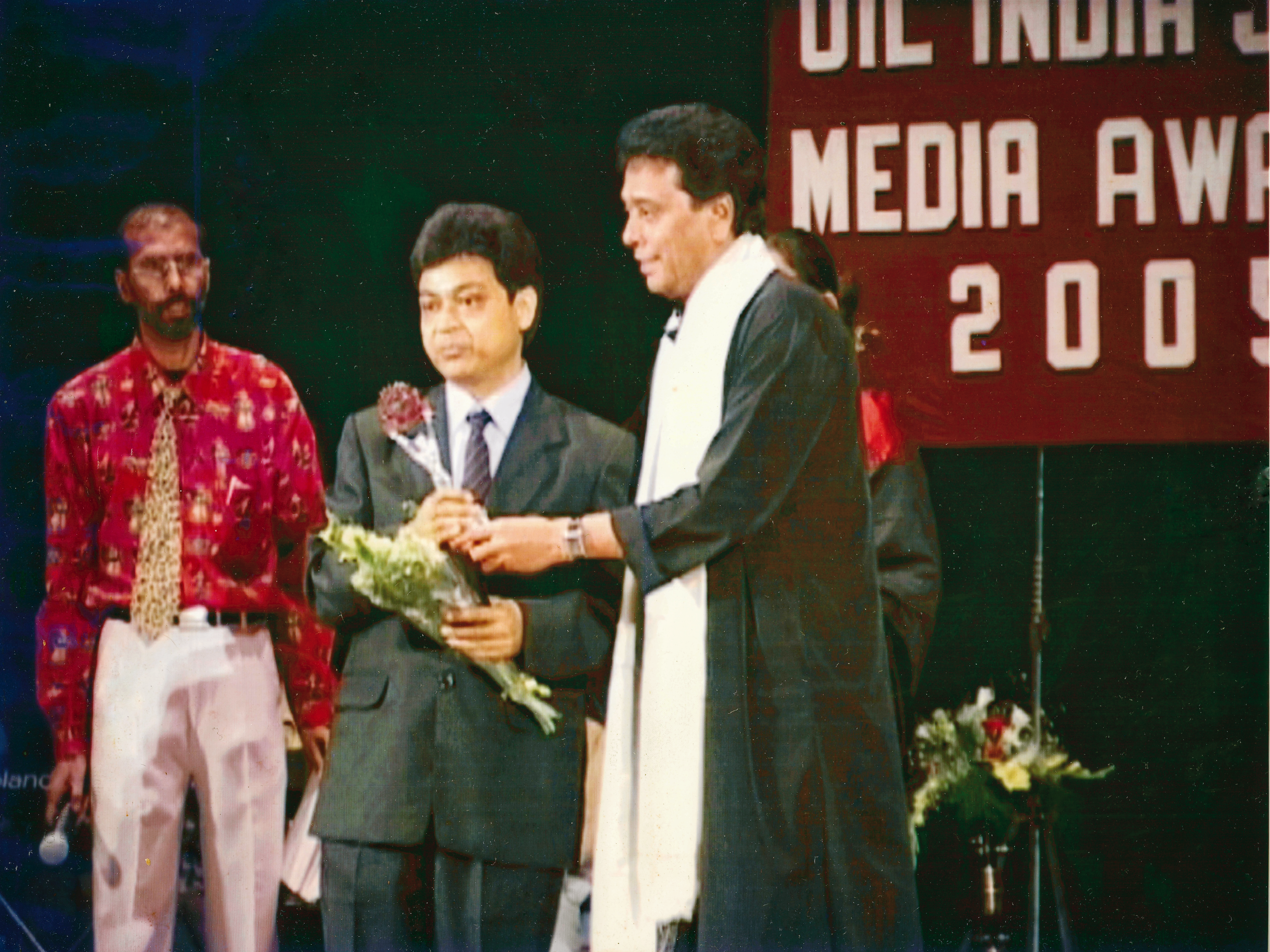
Raj receiving the Jyotirupa-Oil India Joint Media Award for Best Music Director (Preyoshi) from actor Biju Phukan on 25 February 2005

He received the Best Singer award from Moonlight Media for the television serial Astitwa. He sang and composed for several television serials telecast by Doordarshan Kendra Guwahati, including Preyoshi, Sanghat, Atmasamman, Parinati, Natun Asha, and Ma Manasha, as well as the Assamese telefilm Ma Mahamaya, for which he performed with singer Tarali Sarma.

In December 2007, he released the Hindi remake album Tum Bin, which consisted of Bollywood songs originally sung by Mohammed Rafi and Lata Mangeshkar in the 1960s and 1970s, in collaboration with Gitanjali Goswami.

He was a B-High grade artist for bhajan and ghazal singing on All India Radio and Doordarshan.

==== Later work ====
In 2009, he performed Ganesh Vandana and Nataraja Stuti at a national-level seminar at Krishnakanta Handique Sanskrit College in Guwahati. On 30 October 2009, in the occasion of the inauguration of a memorial arch at Kachari in Guwahati, Janam Raj performed a Shiv Vandana on the first anniversary of the 2008 assam bombings. Press reports said that his recital moved the families of the victims and others in the audience. In 2011, he released the Assamese devotional album Om Hari Om with singer Anima Choudhury. The album was released at the Gauhati Press Club on September 28, with music director Ramen Baruah attending as the chief guest. The album contained 50 tracks, most of which lyrics written by him.

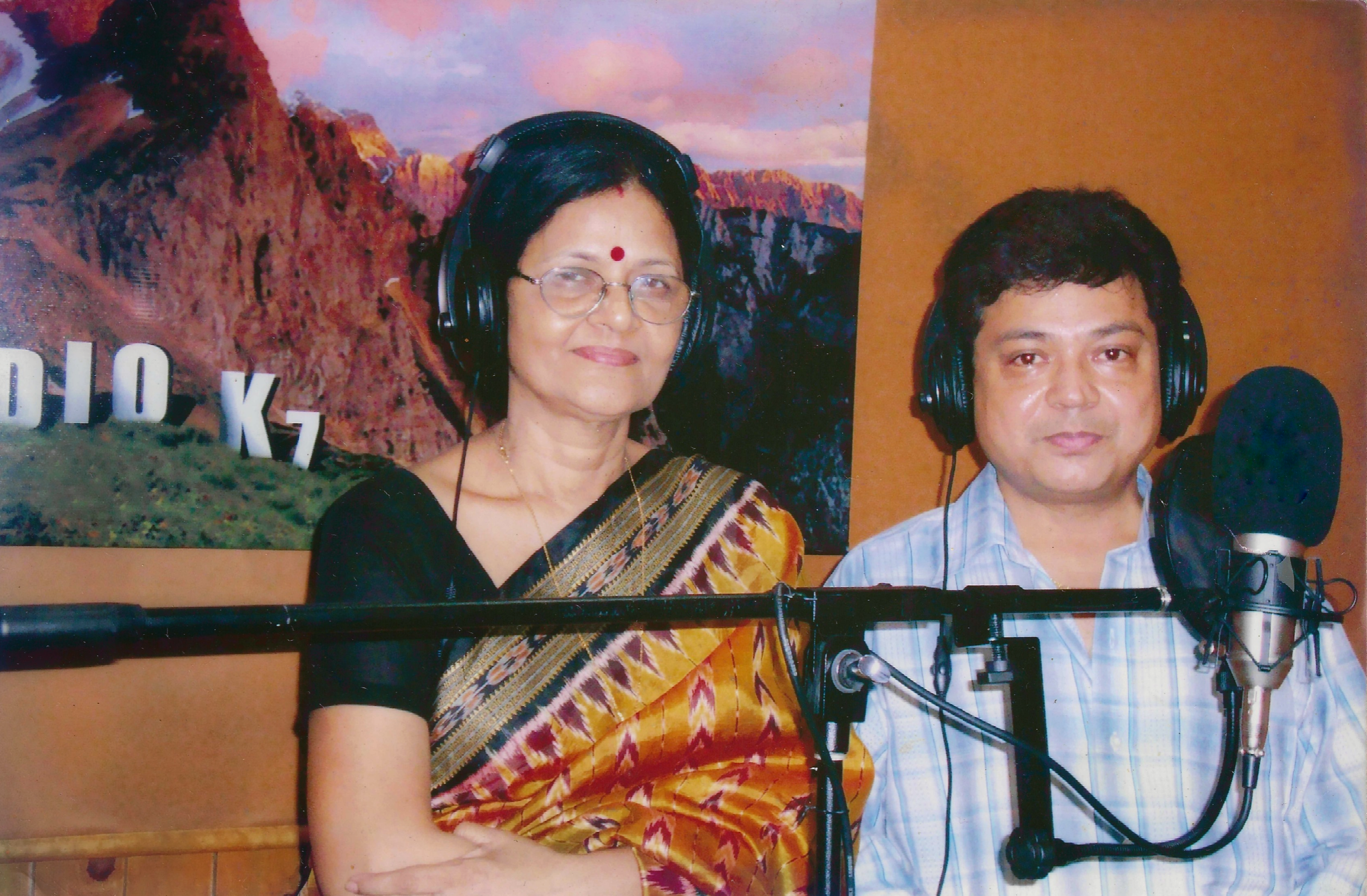
Raj with Anima Choudhury during the recording of Om Hari Om, 2010

In 2018, he was the music director for the Bengali film Tridhara.

=== Law ===
Raj practiced as an advocate at the Gauhati High Court from 2002 until his death, after completing his LL.B. from J.B. Law College. Before entering legal practice, he worked for Vikrant Tyres (later acquired by JK Tyres) and Goodyear Tyres.

During the 2019 Citizenship Amendment Act protests, Janam Raj participated in the 'Raj Bhawan Chalo' rally organized by the All Assam Lawyers' Association outside the Raj Bhawan in Guwahati, where he performed the patriotic song Biswa Bijoy Noujawan in protest.

His work in music and law was featured in Dainik Janambhumi's weekly edition, Janambhumi, in December 2020.

== Death ==
Raj was admitted to Nemcare Hospital in Guwahati on 26 April 2023 after suffering from prolonged heart disease, which led to a minor brain haemorrhage, and died there three days later, on 29 April 2023.

=== Tributes ===
Following his death, Janam Raj was remembered by fellow musicians, colleagues and associates. Singer Anima Choudhury paid tribute to Raj in a Facebook post, describing his death as a personal loss and writing that she had lost “a dear brother and well-wisher.”

"How can such a vibrant person suddenly disappear from among us? I cannot believe that my very dear Janam Raj has gone to an unknown place. I have lent my voice to several of Janam's songs. Many of the things he wanted to do remained unfinished. With Janam’s passing, Assam has lost a true musician. Personally, I have lost a dear brother and well-wisher."

— Anima Choudhury, in a Facebook post tribute to Janam Raj (translated from Assamese).

== Discography ==
Albums

- Premanjali (1998)
- Rimjhim (2004)
- Tum Bin (2007)
- Om Hari Om (2011)
- Tridhara (Original Motion Picture Soundtrack) (2018)

Singles

- Tumi Asila Preyoshi (2004)
- Priya Anjana (2004)
- Sasunsa (2004)
- Jibon Nohoi (2006)
- Shaktirupini (2006)
- Sanghat (2006)
- Atmasamman (2006)
- Shivanandini (2012)
- Burha Luit (2018)
- Mor Aai (2018)
