= Anema =

Anema may refer to:

- Anema (lichen), genus of lichen within the family Lichinaceae
- Anima: Age of the Robots, formerly called Anema, a comic series

== See also ==
- Anema e core (disambiguation)
- Anima (disambiguation)
- Anemas, a Byzantine aristocratic family
- Anemia (disambiguation)
  - Anemia or anaemia, a blood disorder
