= Las Animas =

Las Ánimas or Las Animas may refer to:

== Chile ==
- Las Ánimas complex, Chile, an archaeological site
- Las Animas, Chile

== Colombia ==
- Las Ánimas (volcano), a volcano in the Colombian Andes

== Mexico ==
- Isla Las Ánimas, Mexico, an island in the Gulf of California

== Spain ==
- Las Ánimas, Spain, a village

== United States ==
- Las Animas County, Colorado
- Las Animas, Colorado, a city
- Las Animas National Forest, in Colorado and New Mexico
- Rancho Las Animas, a land grant in Santa Clara County, California

== Uruguay ==
- Cerro de las Ánimas, a peak and the second highest point in Uruguay
- Sierra de las Ánimas, a hill range

== See also ==
- Animas (disambiguation)
- Anima (disambiguation)
