= Animas =

Animas may refer to:

== Places ==
=== United States ===
- Animas River, Colorado
- Animas, New Mexico, a census-designated place
- Animas Valley, New Mexico
  - Animas Creek, an intermittent stream in New Mexico
- Animas Mountains, New Mexico
- Animas Forks, ghost town in Colorado

=== Mexico ===
- Animas River (Mexico), a river of Mexico

== Other uses ==
- Animas Air Park, a privately owned, public-use airport near Durango, Colorado
- Animation Society of Malaysia (ANIMAS)
- Animas (film), a 2018 Spanish thriller film

== See also ==
- Anima (disambiguation)
- Animas Formation, a geologic formation in Colorado
- Animas Trujano (disambiguation)
- Capilla de Ánimas, Spain, a church
- Las Animas (disambiguation)

A filipino last name originated in Iloilo, Philippines.
