= Pontypool japan =

Varnish protection for iron

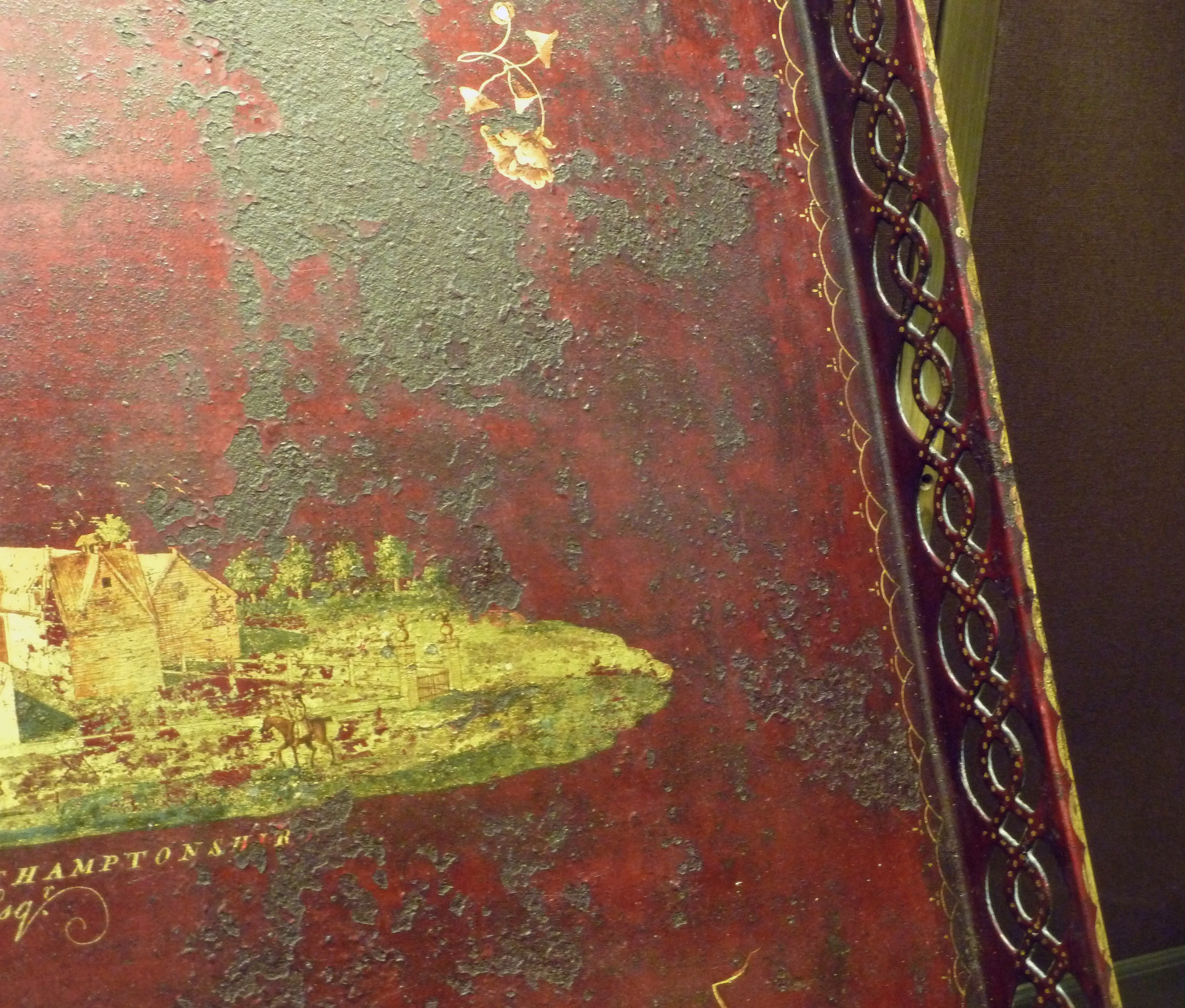
Red-japanned iron tray in Cardiff Museum, commemorating Kelmarsh Old Hall, home of the Hanbury family

Pontypool japan is a name given to the process of japanning with the use of an oil varnish and heat, which is credited to Thomas Allgood of Pontypool. In the late 17th century, during his search for a corrosion-resistant coating for iron, he developed a recipe that included asphaltum, linseed oil and burnt umber. Once applied to metal and heated the coating turned black and was extremely tough and durable.

Pontypool is in a steep valley in South Wales, surrounded by coal and iron working. The iron used was produced by the furnaces of Blaenavon to the north, and most of the "Pontypool ware" was actually produced in nearby Usk or Newport, at the southern end of the valley.

== Background ==
In the late 17th century, there was a developing trade in metal goods made of thin iron sheet, spurred by the development of the rolling mill. Rustproofing this iron was important. Tin plating had been developed in Germany, and British manufacturers needed to compete.

While it was the growth of the iron foundries and tin plating that gave birth to japanning on metal, tin plated iron was not the only metal used. There are examples of brass, copper and bronze used as substrates. In France, copper was the metal primarily used. Because it had to be hammered into shape rather than rolled and stamped, the surface was uneven. This did not provide the best surface for japanning, thus it has a greater tendency to flake off than the smoother English tinware. When the French made tinware it was often trimmed with bronze.

The use of metal allowed a variety of forms that were required to withstand heat and water. Coffee pots, tea sets, candle sticks and other household items could all be japanned and decorated in the popular fashion.

These japanned metal objects are very stable so a great many still survive. Many pieces survive today with little rust. In most cases it is easy to ascertain the underlying metal because it can be seen in losses or scratches. If the japanning is intact, a magnet can be used to identify iron. Most iron trays show some rust on the back where only a single coating was applied. Even the tin plated iron objects show rust in some areas.

It is worth remembering the unavailability of effective paint, at this time. The surface finishes that did exist either had poor adhesion to their substrate, or required either a porous or an organic substrate to bond to. Today's resin-based paints for metals had not been invented.

== Recipes ==
Similar recipes or "secret varnishes" were also used in Birmingham. In his book on Pontypool japan (W. D. John, 1953), published one of the recipes the workmen had handed down through generations:

- 448 pounds of raw linseed oil
- 22 pounds of lump umber
- 20 pounds of flake litharge
- 100 pounds of asphaltum
- 5 pounds of cobalt resinate
- 406 pounds of white spirit or turpentine

The linseed oil was heated together with the umber and the asphaltum while the litharge and cobalt were added slowly. According to the recipe, the varnish was ready when a drop of varnish dripped onto cold glass remained in a ball. After cooling, the turpentine was added. There was also a pale clear version which omitted the asphaltum and the cobalt. In modern tests, this varnish worked equally well on papier mâché and metal plates. Three coats produced a durable glossy black finish.

This recipe is similar to one for gold size published by both (Robert Dossie, 1764) and (Stalker and Parker, 1688). In that version, linseed oil is boiled together with gum animi, asphaltum, litharge and umber in approximately the same proportions as the Pontypool recipe. (Watin, 1755) also describes the use of asphaltum as an addition to the well-known spirit varnishes of the day. It appears that the secret recipe for Pontypool japan had been in existence for some time before its use for japanning metal.

== See also ==
- Japan black
