= Anemia (disambiguation) =

Anemia is a qualitative or quantitative hemoglobin deficiency.

Anemia or anaemia may also refer to:

- Iron deficiency anemia, a type of anemia of lack of iron
- Ischemia, producing localized anemic effects in a body part (but "anemia" is not merely synonymous with "ischemia" in modern usage)
- Anemia (beetle), a genus of darkling beetle
- Anemia (plant), a genus of fern
- Anemia (film), a 1986 Italian film
- "Anaemia", a song from the album Food by British rock band Zico Chain
- "Anaemia", a song from the album The Blue by Italian metal band Novembre

== See also ==
- Anema (disambiguation)
- Anima (disambiguation)
