= Japan black =

Lacquer for metal

Japan black (also called black japan and bicycle paint) is a lacquer or varnish suitable for many substrates but known especially for its use on iron and steel. It can also be called japan lacquer and Brunswick black. Its name comes from the association between the finish and Japanese products in the West. Used as a verb, japan means "to finish in japan black". Thus japanning and japanned are terms describing the process and its products.

Its high bitumen content provides a protective finish that is durable and dries quickly. This allowed japan black to be used extensively in the production of automobiles in the early 20th century in the United States.

== Ingredients ==
Japan black consists mostly of an asphaltic base dissolved in naphtha or turpentine, sometimes with other varnish ingredients, such as linseed oil. It is applied directly to metal parts, and then baked at about 200°C (400°F) for up to an hour.

== Automobile use ==
Japan black's popularity was due in part to its durability as an automotive finish.

The development of quick-drying nitrocellulose lacquers (pyroxylins) which could be colored to suit the needs of the buying public in the 1920s led to the disuse of japan black by the end of the 1920s. In 1924, General Motors introduced "True Blue" Duco (a product of DuPont) nitrocellulose lacquer on its 1925 model Oakland automobile marque products.

=== Ford's formulations ===
Ford used two formulations of japan black, F-101 and F-102 (renamed M-101 and M-102 after March 15, 1922). F-101, the "First Coat Black Elastic Japan", was used as the basic coat applied directly to the metal, while F-102, "Finish Coat Elastic Black Japan", was applied over the first layer. Their compositions were similar: 25–35% asphalt and 10% linseed oil with lead and iron-based dryers, dissolved in 55% thinners (mineral spirits, turpentine substitute or naphtha). The F-101 also had 1–3% of carbon black added as a pigment. The asphalt used in the Ford formulations was specified to be Gilsonite. This has long been used in formulations of paint for use on ironware as it increases the elasticity of the paint layer, allowing it to adhere to steel subjected to vibration, deformation and thermal expansion without cracking or peeling. It is also cheap, yields a glossy dark surface, and acts as a curing agent for the oil.

== See also ==
- Pontypool japan
- Rustproofing
