= Spirit (animating force) =

Vital principle or animating force within all living things

In religion and philosophy, spirit is the vital principle or animating essence within humans or, in some views, all living things. Although views of spirit vary between different belief systems, when spirit is contrasted with the soul, the former is often seen as a basic natural force, principle or substance, whereas the latter is used to describe the organized structure of an individual being's consciousness, in humans to include their personality. Spirit as a substance may also be contrasted with matter, where it is usually seen as more subtle, an idea put forth for example in the Principia Mathematica.

== Etymology ==
The word spirit came into Middle English via Old French esperit. Its source is Latin spīritus, whose original meaning was "breath, breathing" and hence "spirit, soul, courage, vigor"; its ultimate origin is a Proto-Indo-European root *(s)peis-.

In Latin, spīritus was distinct from Latin anima, whose etymological meaning was also "breathing" (PIE root *h₂enh₁-), (Note: anə-, from *ə₂enə₁-.) yet which had taken a slightly different meaning, namely "soul".

The distinction between "soul" and "spirit" in English mirrors that between "psykhē" and "pneuma" in Classical Greek, with both words having a connection to breathing:

ψυχή	psykhē	originally "cold air", hence "breath of life" and "soul" (PIE root *bhes- "to breathe") (Note: bhes-² (with zero grade *bhs- devoicing leading to *phs- and later ps- in Classical Greek).)
πνεῦμα	pneuma	"breath, motile air, spirit", from verb πνέω (pnéō) "to breathe"

=== Related terms ===
Similar concepts in other languages include Chinese Ling and hun (靈魂) and Sanskrit akasha / atman (see also prana). Some languages use a word for spirit often closely related (if not synonymous) to mind. Examples include the German Geist (related to the English word ghost) or the French l'esprit. English versions of the Bible most commonly translate the Hebrew word ruach (רוח; wind) as "the spirit".

A distinction between soul and spirit developed in Arabic and Hebrew: Arabic nafs (نفس) opposite rūḥ (روح); and Hebrew neshama (נְשָׁמָה nəšâmâh) or nephesh (נֶ֫פֶשׁ nép̄eš) (in Hebrew, neshama comes from the root NŠM or "breath") opposite ruach (רוּחַ rúaħ). (Note, however, that in Semitic just as in Indo-European, this dichotomy has not always been as neat historically as it has come to be taken over a long period of development: Both נֶ֫פֶשׁ (root נפשׁ) and רוּחַ (root רוח), as well as cognate words in various Semitic languages, including Arabic, also preserve meanings involving miscellaneous air phenomena: "breath", "wind", and even "odour".)

Alternatively, Hebrew texts commonly use the word nephesh. Kabbalists regard nephesh as one of the five parts of the Jewish soul, where nephesh (animal) refers to the physical being and its animal instincts. Similarly, Scandinavian, Baltic, and Slavic languages use the words for breath to express concepts similar to "the spirit".

== Views ==
=== Ancient Greece ===
In Ancient Greek medicine and philosophy generally, the spirit (pneuma, literally "breath") was thought to be the animating force in living creatures. Plato considered the spirit to be one of three parts of a person's soul.

In Stoicism, spirit is an all-pervading force frequently identified with God. The soul (psyche) was thought to be a particular kind of pneuma, which was present in humans and animals, but not in plants.

=== Christianity ===
The Christian New Testament uses the term pneuma to refer to "spirit", "spiritual" and specifically to the Holy Spirit. The relationship between the Holy Spirit in Christianity and spirit in other religions is unclear. The distinction between psyche and pneuma may be borrowed from the Hellenistic religions through Hellenistic Jews such as Philo, a view held by the so-called History of religions school.

However, others think that the Holy Spirit may actually resemble the Stoic concept of the anima mundi, or world soul, more than the pneuma. According to theologian Erik Konsmo, there is no relationship between the pneuma in Greek philosophy and the pneuma in Christianity beyond the use of the word itself.

The new religious movement Christian Science uses "Spirit" as one of seven synonyms for God, as in: "Principle; Mind; Soul; Spirit; Life; Truth; Love". (Note: GOD – The great I AM; the all-knowing, all-seeing, all-acting, all-wise, all-loving, and eternal; Principle; Mind; Soul; Spirit; Life; Truth; Love; all substance; intelligence. — Eddy (1975), p. 587)

Latter Day Saint prophet Joseph Smith Jr. (1805–1844) rejected the concept of spirit as incorporeal or without substance: "There is no such thing as immaterial matter. All spirit is matter, but it is more fine or pure, and can only be discerned by purer eyes." Regarding the soul, Joseph Smith wrote "And the Gods formed man from the dust of the ground, and took his spirit (that is, the man’s spirit), and put it into him; and breathed into his nostrils the breath of life, and man became a living soul." Thus, the soul is the combination of a spirit with a body (although most members of the Church use "soul" and "spirit" interchangeably). In Latter-Day Saint scripture, spirits are sometimes referred to as "intelligences". However, other LDS scriptures teach that God organized the spirits out of a pre-existing substance called "intelligence" or "the light of truth".

=== 17th century Europe ===
As recently as 1628 and 1633 respectively, both William Harvey and René Descartes still speculated that somewhere within the body, in a special locality, there was a "vital spirit" or "vital force", which animated the whole bodily frame, just as the engine in a factory moves the machinery in it. (Note: ... because of the improvement in philosophy ... men began to break loose from the trammels of Greek and mediaeval metaphysics, and to realize that a process is not explained by the arbitrary assumption of some hypothetical cause invented to account for it. So long as the phenomena exhibited by living things were regarded, not as manifestations of the properties of the kind of matter of which they were composed, but as mere exhibitions of the activity of an extrinsic independent entity, a pneuma, anima, vital spirit, or vital principle which had temporarily taken up its residence in the body of an animal, but had no more essential connection with that body than a tenant with the house in which he lives – there was no need for physiological laboratories. ... Both Harvey and Descartes, however, still believed in a special locally placed vital spirit or vital force, which animated the whole bodily frame as the engine in a great factory moves all the machinery in it. — Martin (1884), pp. 74–75)

=== Animism ===
Various forms of animism, such as Japan's Shinto and African traditional religion, focus on invisible beings that represent or connect with plants, animals, or landforms (in Japanese: kami); translators usually employ the English word "spirit" when trying to express the idea of such entities.

=== Chinese culture ===
The traditional Chinese concept of qi is a kind of vital force forming part of any living being. The exact meaning of the term morphed over the course of the development of Chinese philosophy. The literal meaning of the Chinese language term qi (气), like many analogous concepts in other cultures, derives from the word for "breath"; this may have been the meaning of the word in the Analects of Confucius.

Gods, especially anthropromorphic gods, are sometimes thought to have qi and be a reflection of the microcosm of qi in humans. Qi also was in natural forces, where it could be controlled by gods and harnessed by magicians.

=== Jung ===
According to C. G. Jung (in a lecture delivered to the literary Society of Augsburg, 20 October 1926, on the theme of “Nature and Spirit”):

The connection between spirit and life is one of those problems involving factors of such complexity that we have to be on our guard lest we ourselves get caught in the net of words in which we seek to ensnare these great enigmas. For how can we bring into the orbit of our thought those limitless complexities of life which we call "Spirit" or "Life" unless we clothe them in verbal concepts, themselves mere counters of the intellect? The mistrust of verbal concepts, inconvenient as it is, nevertheless seems to me to be very much in place in speaking of fundamentals. "Spirit" and "Life" are familiar enough words to us, very old acquaintances in fact, pawns that for thousands of years have been pushed back and forth on the thinker's chessboard. The problem must have begun in the grey dawn of time, when someone made the bewildering discovery that the living breath which left the body of the dying man in the last death-rattle meant more than just air in motion. It can scarcely be an accident onomatopoeic words like ruach (Hebrew), ruch (Arabic), roho (Swahili) mean 'spirit' no less clearly than πνεύμα (pneuma, Greek) and spiritus (Latin).

=== Islam ===
People have frequently conceived of spirit as a supernatural being, or non-physical entity; for example, a demon, ghost, fairy, or angel. In ancient Islamic terminology however, the term spirit (rūḥ), applies only to "pure" spirits, but not to other invisible creatures, such as jinn, demons and angels.

=== Psychical research ===
Psychical research, "In all the publications of the Society for Psychical Research the term 'spirit' stands for the personal stream of consciousness whatever else it may ultimately be proved to imply or require." (James H. Hyslop, 1919)

== Death ==
The concepts of spirit and soul often overlap, (Note: OED: "spirit 2.a.: The soul of a person, as commended to God, or passing out of the body, in the moment of death.") and some systems propose that both survive bodily death. (Note: For example: "... the spirit and soul which occupied and used the body have withdrawn from it.... Soul and spirit both survive death." — Sill (1996), p. 16)

In some belief systems, the "spirit" may separate from the body upon death and remain in the world in the form of a ghost, i.e. a manifestation of the spirit of a deceased person.

== See also ==
- Brahman
- Ekam
- Geisteswissenschaft
- Great Spirit or Wakan Tanka is a term for the Supreme Being.
- Manitou
- Philosophy of religion
- Pneumatology
- Scientific skepticism
- Shen (Chinese religion)
- Soul
- Soul dualism
- Soul flight
- Spiritualism
- Spiritism
- Spirit world (Latter Day Saints)
- Spirit world (Spiritualism)
