= Regina Mundi =

Regina Mundi may be:

- Queen of the World (disambiguation)
- Regina Mundi Catholic Church (Soweto)
- Mary, Queen of the World Cathedral
- Santuario di Maria Santissima Regina del Mondo
- Regina Mundi Catholic College
- Regina Mundi Cathedral, Bujumbura
- Regina Mundi High School
- Beata Mundi Regina
- Regina High School (Michigan)
- The Regina Mundi Pontifical Institute

== See also ==
- Queen of Heaven
