= Coati Mundi =

Coati Mundi may refer to:

- Coatimundi (sometimes Coati Mundi), or coati, two genera of mammals of the family Procyonidae native to South America, Central America, Mexico, and the southwestern United States
  - White-nosed coati, or coatimundi, the North American species of coati
- Coati Mundi (musician), the stage name of American musician Andy Hernandez (b. 1950)

== See also ==
- Caput Mundi, a Latin phrase for "capital of the world"
