= Anema e core =

"Anema e core" may refer to:

- Anema e core (film), or My Heart Sings, a 1951 Italian comedy film
- "Anema e core" (1950 song), a popular Neapolitan song
- "Anema e core" (Serena Brancale song), a 2025 song by Italian singer Serena Brancale
