= Arya Vidyapeeth College =

College in Assam

Arya Vidyapeeth College (Autonomous)
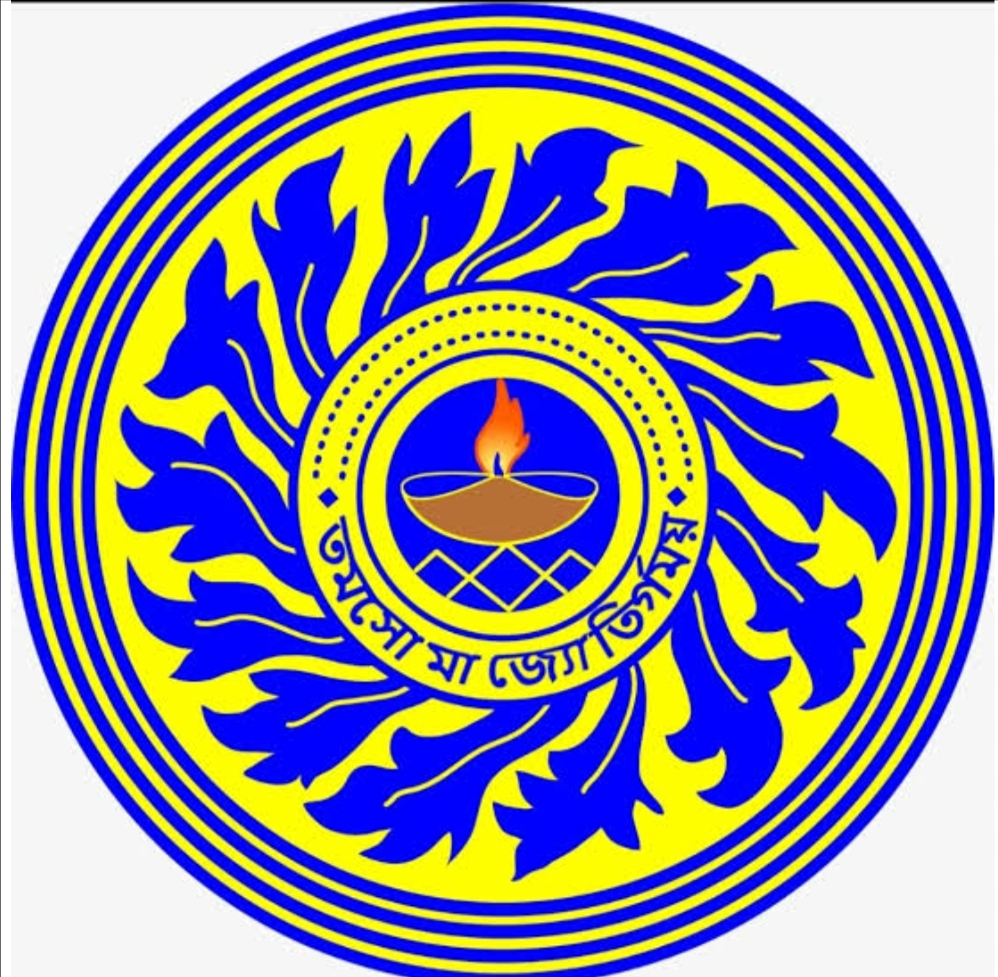
- Motto: Tomaso Ma Jyotirgamaya
- Motto in English: Let the advent of light remove all darkness
- Type: Public
- Established: 1958 (68 years ago)
- Founder: Pt. Giridhar Sarma
- Affiliations: Gauhati University
- Principal: Dr. Pradip Kumar Bhattacharyya
- Location: A.K Azad Road, Arya Nagar, Guwahati, 781016, Assam, India
- Campus: Urban
- Website: avcollege.ac.in

Arya Vidyapeeth College (Autonomous) is a liberal Science, Arts and Commerce college, located at Kamrup Metropolitan district. It is one of the oldest and reputed educational institution in Assam. It was established on 29 July 1958. The college is affiliated to Gauhati University.

== History ==
Arya Vidyapeeth College, founded on 29th July 1958, is a significant institution in Assam, primarily focusing on higher education for the youth across Northeast India. Its establishment was the result of a concerted effort by visionary figures such as Giridhar Sarma, a notable academic and litterateur. The college has contributed to academic advancement by introducing postgraduate courses in Mathematics and Chemistry, as well as undergraduate courses in Commerce.

Over time, the college has expanded its academic offerings, providing major courses in 19 subjects at the undergraduate level and certificate courses in areas like computers and bioinformatics. The college also hosts a Biotech Hub supported by the Department of Biotechnology (DBT), Government of India, which was upgraded to an Advanced Institutional Biotech Hub in 2015. Arya Vidyapeeth College has a Study Centre under IGNOU, providing distance learning opportunities. Additionally, the institution was recognized as a College with Potential for Excellence (CPE) by the University Grants Commission (UGC), and various projects have been undertaken as part of this recognition. In response to modern educational needs, Arya Vidyapeeth College has adopted the Choice Based Credit System (CBCS) for its undergraduate courses, starting from the 2019-2020 session. Arya Vidyapeeth College actively participates in community outreach, adopting local villages and providing educational support. Faculty members engage in research, authoring books, and contributing to national and international academic forums.

== Accreditation ==
- In 2018, Arya Vidyapeeth College received an 'A' grade from the National Assessment and Accreditation Council (NAAC) with a cumulative score of 3.06, ranking 2nd among colleges affiliated with Gauhati University respectively.
- In 2022 University Grants Commission (UGC) grants Arya Vidyapeeth College as Autonomous college.

== Admission ==
=== Undergraduate (UG) ===
Arya Vidyapeeth College, has announced the cut-off marks for its undergraduate programs for the academic year 2023-24.

==== Arts ====
For the Arts stream, the General Category has the highest cut-off at 94%. The OBC category requires a cut-off mark of 76%, and the SC category has a minimum requirement of 73%. The cut-offs for the ST-P and ST-H categories are 72% and 74%, respectively.

==== Commerce ====
For the Commerce stream, the cut-off marks for the General Category are set at 80.6%. The Other Backward Classes (OBC) category has a cut-off of 73%, while the Scheduled Caste (SC) category requires a cut-off mark of 69.2%. For the Scheduled Tribe-Hills (ST-H) category, the minimum requirement is 62%, and the Scheduled Tribe-Plains (ST-P) category has a cut-off of 47%.

==== Science ====
In the Science stream, the cut-off marks for the General Category are higher, at 82%. The OBC category follows with a cut-off of 78%, while the SC category has a minimum requirement of 75%. The cut-off marks for the ST-Plains (ST-P) and ST-Hills (ST-H) categories are set at 76% and 70%, respectively.

== Seat Intake ==
Course Seat Capacity
Course	Seat Capacity
Higher Secondary Arts	120
Higher Secondary Science	120
Higher Secondary Commerce	120
Under Graduate Course in Arts (Major & Honours)	885
Under Graduate Course in Science (Major & Honours)	515
Under Graduate Course in Commerce (Major & Honours) (Self-Financed)	360
Post Graduate Course in Mathematics	50
Post Graduate Course in Chemistry (Self-Financed)	25

== Campus ==
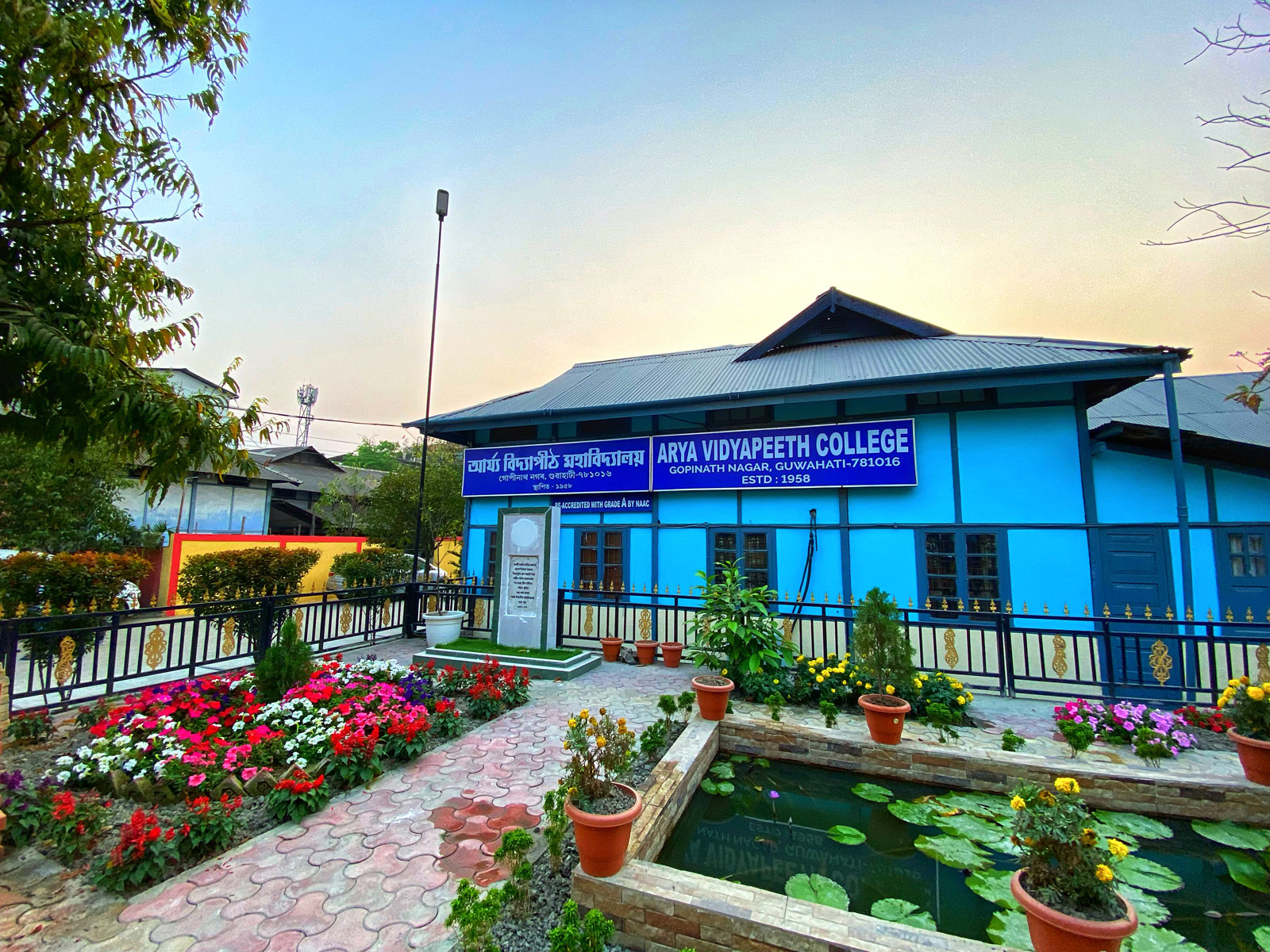
College Campus

Arya Vidyapeeth College boasts a spacious campus spanning over 15 acres, which includes academic buildings, hostels, residential areas, a sports ground, and an Urban Health Centre. It is the largest affiliated college of Gauhati University by area.

== Facilities ==
=== Physical and support facilities ===
The college campus encompasses extensive facilities, including designated areas for academic, residential, and sports-related activities. The academic section contains several buildings used for classrooms, laboratories, libraries, and administrative offices. The residential area includes two hostels, one each for male and female students, as well as a Primary Health Centre. Campus maintenance and development are managed through several committees. A Construction Committee, established by the college's Governing Body, oversees all construction projects, ensuring compliance with government procedures. The Principal seeks required approvals from the Governing Body and relevant government agencies for executing construction work. Daily campus cleaning is managed through an outsourced third-party service provider. Additionally, a Hostel Committee is responsible for the upkeep and development of the hostels, with recommendations presented to the Principal for necessary action. The Primary Health Centre on campus operates under the National Health Mission. The Playground Development Committee is in charge of maintaining and enhancing the college’s playground, with its proposals reviewed and implemented by the Principal upon approval from the Governing Body. The college canteen operates through a third-party vendor, and the Principal may establish various committees, clubs, and cells as needed to support the campus's physical and support facilities.

=== Academic facilities ===
The college’s highest academic authority is the Committee of the Heads of Departments, chaired by the Principal, which is responsible for approving all academic matters. Within each department, academic and other departmental activities are managed by the Departmental Action Committee (DAC), led by the respective Head of Department. The Internal Quality Assurance Cell (IQAC) provides recommendations for enhancing the college’s overall academic standards. To ensure the smooth operation of examinations and evaluations, an Examination Committee is established, also chaired by the Principal. The Central Library is fully automated and digitally managed to meet the needs of both students and faculty. A Library Committee oversees the development and maintenance of the library facilities.

== Departments ==
=== Arts ===
- Assamese
- Bengali
- Economics
- Education
- English
- Geography
- History
- Philosophy
- Political Science
- Sanskrit

=== Commerce ===
- Accountancy
- Business

=== Science ===
- Anthropology
- Botany
- Chemistry
- Geology
- Mathematics
- Physics
- Statistics
- Zoology
- GEOGRAPHY

== Politics ==
In the 2024 Arya Vidyapeeth College Students' Union Election, the All Assam Students' Union (AASU) won a majority, securing 8 of the 16 available positions. Madhurjya Kumar Nath and Pragya Gogoi, both AASU candidates, were elected as General Secretary and Assistant General Secretary, respectively. Other positions filled by AASU candidates include Debashish Saraniya as Debate Secretary, Rahul Das as Cultural Secretary, Bishnu Bikash Boruah as Fine Arts Secretary, Bishal Jyoti Bharadwaj as Magazine Secretary, Kamal Chetry as Major Games Secretary, and Ali Haider Laskar as Secretary of Boys' Common Room. The President's position was won by independent candidate Bhaswati Goswami, with Rashmita Devi also elected as Vice-President. Three positions remain vacant: Secretary of General Sports, Secretary of Minor Games, and Secretary of Girls' Common Room. Arya Nandan Kakoti of ABVP won the position of Literary Secretary, while Atanu Sarkar was elected as Gymnasium Secretary.

== Library ==
The Arya Vidyapeeth College library, established in 1958 alongside the college, began with a modest collection and has since expanded significantly. Today, it houses over 55,000 volumes of textbooks and reference materials spanning various subjects. The library also subscribes to numerous journals, magazines, and newspapers, with plans underway to acquire additional online research journals to support academic needs. In its attached reading room, students and faculty can access textbooks, reference books, journals, magazines, and newspapers. Each department also maintains a departmental library, offering reference materials for in-depth consultation. To encourage reading, the library committee awards the “Best Library User” on Librarian’s Day. Library resources are fully computerized using KOHA open-source software, and students can check book availability through dedicated computers. The library provides internet facilities for research and advanced studies, maintains an institutional repository, and offers digital photocopying services. Additionally, the college has extensive online journal access, including connectivity to the N-LIST library consortium, supported by the Government of India. Regular feedback is collected from users to improve library services continuously.
