= Las Animas National Forest =

National Forest in Colorado and New Mexico

Las Animas National Forest was established by the U.S. Forest Service in Colorado and New Mexico on March 1, 1907 with 196,620 acres (795.7 km^{2}), only 420 of which were in New Mexico. On May 27, 1910 part of Las Animas was transferred to San Isabel National Forest and the remainder was returned to public domain. The name was discontinued.
