= Mundi, Kapurthala =

Mundi
- Village
- Location in Punjab, India Mundi (India)
- Coordinates: 31.365266°N 75.208523°E
- Country: India
- State: Punjab
- District: Kapurthala

Government
  - Body: Gram panchayat

Population (2011)
  - Total: 1,377
- Sex ratio 707/670♂/♀

Languages
  - Official: Punjabi
  - Other spoken: Hindi
- Time zone: UTC+5:30 (IST)
- PIN: 144601
- Telephone code: 01822
- ISO 3166 code: IN-PB
- Vehicle registration: PB-09
- Website: kapurthala.gov.in

Mundi is a village in Kapurthala district of Punjab State, India. It is located 18 kilometres (11 mi) from Kapurthala, which is both district and sub-district headquarters of Mundi. The village is administrated by a Sarpanch, who is an elected representative.

== Demography ==
According to the report published by Census India in 2011, Mundi has total number of 261 houses and population of 1,377 of which include 707 males and 670 females. Literacy rate of Mundi is 59.29%, lower than state average of 75.84%. The population of children under the age of 6 years is 188 which is 13.65% of total population of Mundi, and child sex ratio is approximately 790, lower than state average of 846.

== Population data ==
Particulars	Total	Male	Female
Total No. of Houses	261	-	-
Total Population	1,377	707	670
In the age group 0–6 years	188	105	83
Scheduled Castes (SC)	1,151	588	563
Scheduled Tribes (ST)	0	0	0
Literates	705	402	303
Illiterate	672	305	367
Total Worker	572	394	178
Main Worker	569	393	176
Marginal Worker	3	1	2

== Air travel connectivity ==
The closest airport to the village is Sri Guru Ram Dass Jee International Airport.
