= Anima Mundi (disambiguation) =

Anima mundi is a Latin phrase meaning "the soul of the world"

Anima Mundi may also refer to:

== Film ==
- Anima Mundi (film), a 1992 documentary film directed by Godfrey Reggio
- Anima Mundi (event), a Brazilian video and film festival

== Music ==
- Anima Mundi (album), the second album by Dionysus
- Anima Mundi (band), a Cuban progressive rock band

== Other uses ==
- Animamundi: Dark Alchemist, a 2002 game by Hirameki International
- Anima Mundi, Vatican City, an ethnographic museum
