= Anima (ensemble) =

Anima (musica mundana humana et instrumentalis) is a Brazilian chamber music ensemble.

Anima was formed in 2011 by Marlui Miranda (singing, arrangements, Brazilian indigenous flutes, percussion, and research); Silvia Ricardino (Trobadour harp, research, and arrangements); Marília Vargas (soprano, research, and arrangements); Paulo Dias (percussion, harpsichord, organetto, research and arrangements); Gisela Nogueira – (viola of wire, research and arrangements); Luiz Fiaminghi (Brazilian rabecas research, arrangements, production, and executive direction), and Valeria Bittar (recorders, Brazilian indigenous flutes, research, arrangements, executive direction, and production).

Anima's last album is entitled Donzela Guerreira, by the label SESC of São Paulo state, in March 2010.

== Discography ==
- Donzela Guerreira (2010)
- Espelho (2006)
- Amares (2003
- Especiarias (200)
- Teatro do Descobrimento (1999)
- Espiral do Tempo (1997/1998)

== Awards ==
- Prêmio Estímulo pela Secretaria Municipal de Cultura da Cidade de Campinas (1993)
- "Melhor Conjunto de Música de Câmara" pela Associação Paulista de Críticos de Arte (APCA), em Música Erudita (1998)
- Prêmio "Melhor Conjunto de Música de Câmara" no V Prêmio Carlos Gomes de Música Erudita, (2000)
- Indicado ao IV e VIII Prêmio Carlos Gomes de Música Erudita, na categoria "Melhor Conjunto de música de Câmera" em 1999 e 2003.
- Prêmio Movimento de Música Brasileira. Categoria: melhor CD com arranjos instrumentais (1997)
