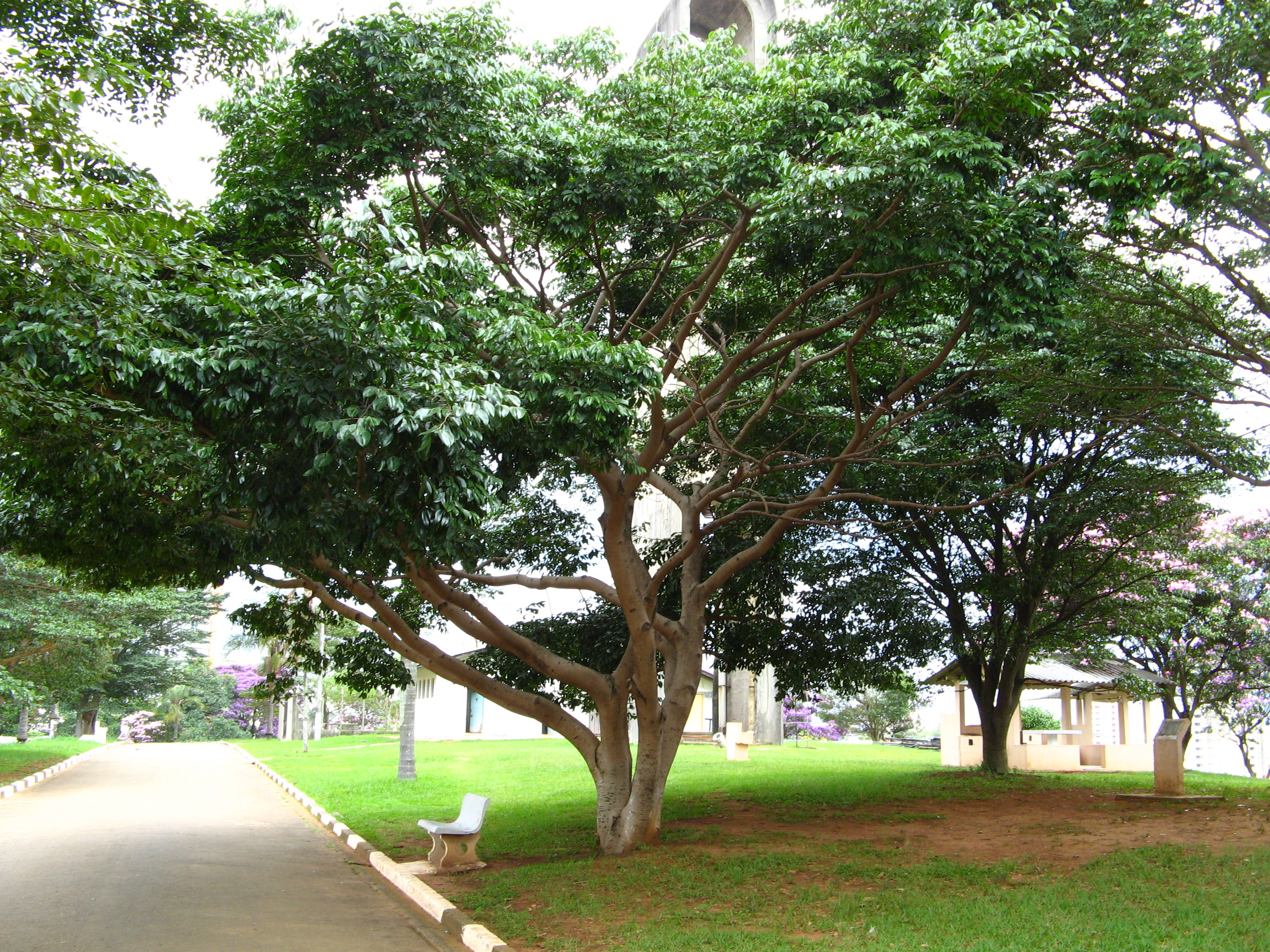
- Hymenaea courbaril
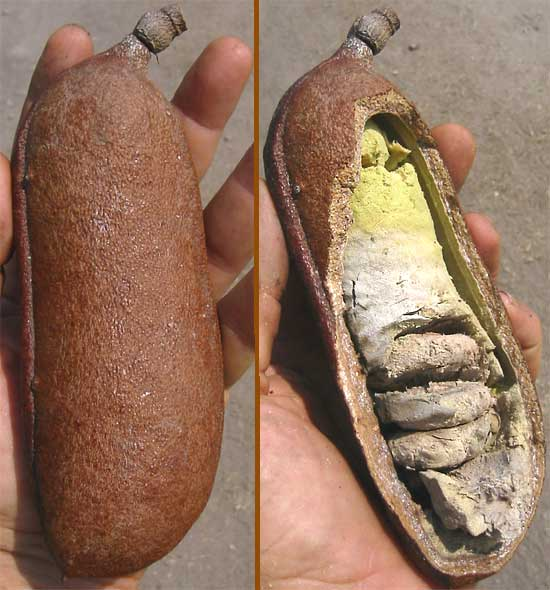

Conservation status
- Least Concern (IUCN 3.1)

Scientific classification
- Kingdom: Plantae
- Clade: Tracheophytes
- Clade: Angiosperms
- Clade: Eudicots
- Clade: Rosids
- Order: Fabales
- Family: Fabaceae
- Genus: Hymenaea
- Species: H. courbaril

Binomial name
- Hymenaea courbaril L. (1753)

Synonyms
- Hymenaea animifera Stokes (1812); Hymenaea candolleana Kunth (1824); Hymenaea confertifolia Hayne (1830); Hymenaea courbaril var. obtusifolia Ducke (1925); Hymenaea courbaril var. stilbocarpa (Hayne) Y.T.Lee & Langenh. (1974); Hymenaea courbaril var. subsessilis Ducke (1925); Hymenaea courbaril var. villosa Y.T.Lee & Andrade-Lima (1974); Hymenaea multiflora Kleinhoonte (1925 publ. 1926); Hymenaea resinifera Salisb. 1796); Hymenaea retusa Willd. ex Hayne (1830); Hymenaea splendida Vogel (1837); Hymenaea stilbocarpa Hayne (1830); Inga megacarpa M.E.Jones (1929); Peltogyne confertifolia (Hayne) Benth. (1870)

= Hymenaea courbaril =

Species of plant

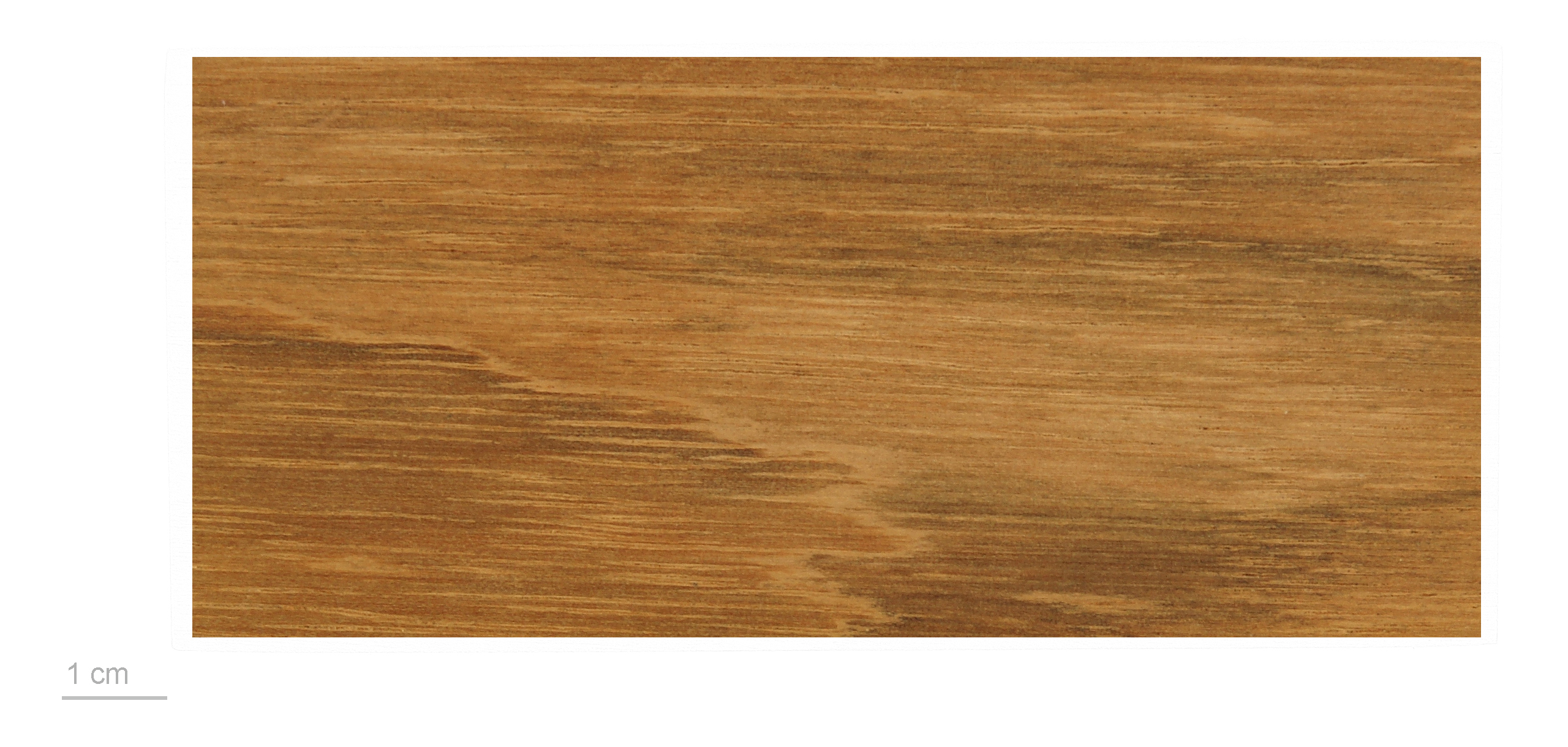
Hymenaea courbaril

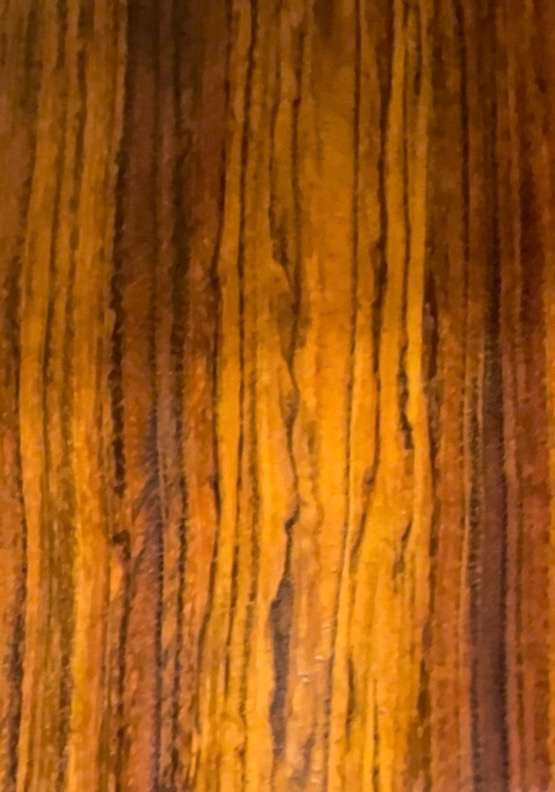
Hymenaea courbaril plank, oiled with lemon oil

Hymenaea courbaril, the courbaril or West Indian locust, is a hardwood tree common in the Caribbean and Central and South America. As lumber it is frequently used to make furniture, flooring, and decoration. Its hard fruit pods have an edible dry pulp surrounding the seeds. Its sap, called animé, is used for incense, perfume, and varnish.

== Names ==
Hymenaea courbaril is commonly known as the "jatobá", "courbaril", "West Indian locust", "Brazilian copal", and "amami-gum". In Puerto Rico, the tree is commonly known as “algarrobo”, while its fruit as “algarroba”.

When used as flooring the tree is commonly referred to as "Brazilian cherry" or "South American cherry" because of the reddish color of the wood it yields—its wood is in fact much redder than that of the cherry tree. However, it is not a member of Prunus but instead a legume of the family Fabaceae. In the regions to which the tree is indigenous it is known as "stinking toe", "old man's toe", and "stinktoe" due to the strong cheese-like odor of the edible pulp in its seed pods.

== Fruit ==
Its fruit, also known as locust, was a major food for indigenous peoples. Those who eat it do not consider the odor unpleasant. The pulp, in spite of its somewhat disagreeable odor, has a sweet taste; is consumed raw; may be dried and transformed into powder to be incorporated into cookies, crackers, and soups; and may be mixed with water to prepare a drink called "atole". The pulp inside the hard shells appears like miniature soluble fibers that dissolve easily in water or milk, which it thickens. Some add sugar to it for more sweetness. If consumed raw it tends to stick inside the mouth like dry dust. It is one of the richest vegetable foods known because of its high concentrations of starches and proteins. It is further an excellent concentrated feed for animals.

== Animé ==
The tree produces an orange, soft, sticky resin or gum, called "animé" (French for "animated", in reference to its insect-infested natural state). The resin has a specific gravity varying from 1.054 to 1.057. It melts readily over fire, and softens even with the heat of the mouth. It diffuses white fumes and a very pleasant odor. Insects are generally entrapped in it in large numbers. It is insoluble in water, and nearly so in cold alcohol. It is similar to copal in its nature and appearance, and a copal from Zanzibar is sometimes given this name.

The production of animé may be encouraged by wounding the bark. The resin collects between the principal roots. It can be obtained from other species of Hymenaea growing in tropical South America.

Brazilians use it internally to treat diseases of the lungs. It was formerly an ingredient of ointments and plasters, but at present its only use is for incense and varnish.

== Wood ==
The wood is very hard, measuring 5.6 on the Brinell scale and 2,350 lbf (10,500 N) on the Janka scale, approximate measurements of hardness. For comparison, Douglas fir measures 660 lbf (2,900 N), white oak 1,360 lbf (6,000 N), and Brazilian walnut 3,800 lbf (17,000 N) on the Janka scale. It features a tan to salmon color with black accent stripes that over time turn to a deep and vibrant red.

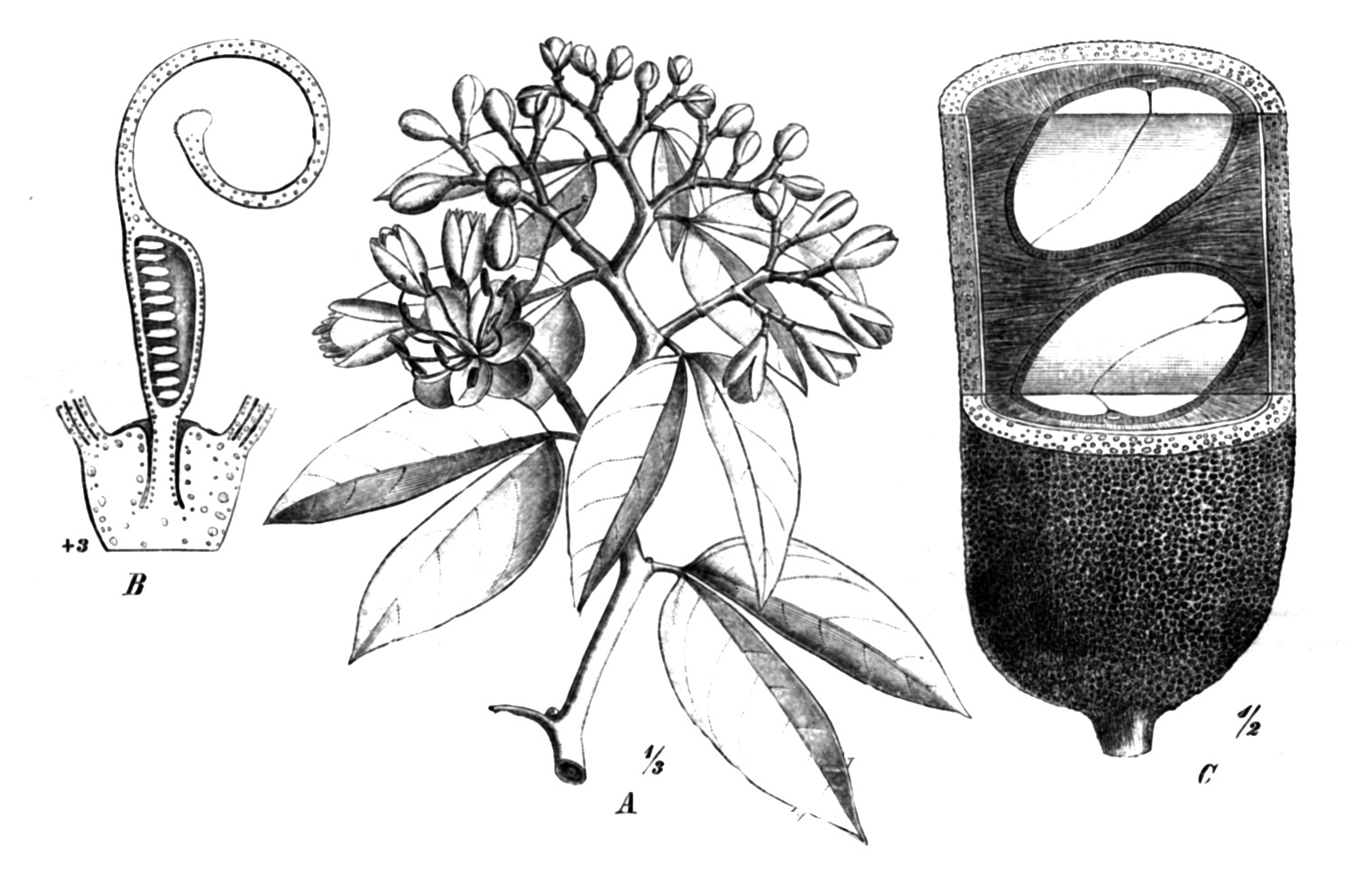
Illustration from Natürliche Pflanzenfamilien, Volume 3, 3 (1891)

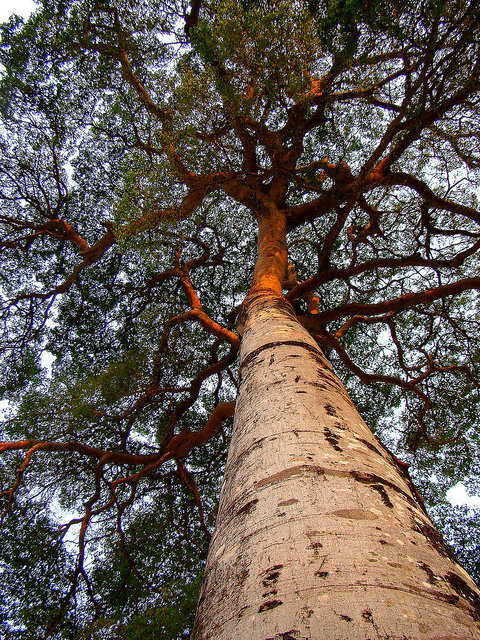
Tree in Mococa, Brazil
