= Animas Trujano =

Ánimas Trujano may refer to:

- Ánimas Trujano (film), a 1962 Mexican film directed by Ismael Rodríguez
- Ánimas Trujano, Oaxaca, a town and municipality in Oaxaca in south-western Mexico
