= Mundi Kasu =

- Village
- Location in Punjab, India Mundi Kasu (India)
- Coordinates: 31.1160391°N 75.1463975°E
- Country: India
- State: Punjab
- District: Jalandhar
- Tehsil: Shahkot

Government
  - Type: Panchayat raj
  - Body: Gram panchayat
- Elevation: 240 m (790 ft)

Population (2011)
  - Total: 117
- Sex ratio 57/60 ♂/♀

Languages
  - Official: Punjabi
- Time zone: UTC+5:30 (IST)
- ISO 3166 code: IN-PB
- Vehicle registration: PB- 08
- Website: jalandhar.nic.in

Mundi Kasu is a village in Shahkot in Jalandhar district of Punjab State, India. It is located 33 kilometres (21 mi) from Shahkot, 41 kilometres (25 mi) from Nakodar, 54 kilometres (34 mi) from district headquarter Jalandhar and 197 kilometres (122 mi) from state capital Chandigarh. The village is administrated by a sarpanch who is an elected representative of village as per Panchayati raj (India).

== Population ==
According to 2011 census report Mundi Kasu has 19 households with the total population of 117 persons of which 57 are male and 60 are female. The total population of children in the age group 0-6 is 7.

== Transport ==
Shahkot Malisian station is the nearest train station. The village is 102 kilometres (63 mi) away from domestic airport in Ludhiana and the nearest international airport is located in Chandigarh also Sri Guru Ram Dass Jee International Airport is the second nearest airport which is 103 kilometres (64 mi) away in Amritsar.
