= Anima (organization) =

Danish animal rights organization

Anima is a Danish animal rights organization founded in 2000. Its core focus is on factory farms and the fur industry. The organization's motto is "the organization for the rights of all animals". Anima works by organizing protests, raising awareness about animal abuse, and providing information and advice on vegan/vegetarian eating.

== Selected history ==
=== Ban on imports of cat and dog fur ===
The organization collected 200,000 signatures on a petition, and held protests at the main dealer of dog and cat fur. In 2003, imports of dog and cat fur were banned in Denmark. A similar ban was implemented in 2007 by the European Union.

=== Ban on import of seal products ===
The organization worked on the Danish part of a campaign to ban the import of seal products from Canada, Norway or Namibia, stating that the seal hunt is inherently inhumane. The European Union banned the import of seal products in 2009, which took effect in 2010.

=== Fur-free fashion ===
The organization campaigns directly with sellers of clothing to make fur-free the norm in Danish fashion. In 2014, there were 160 companies committing to selling only fur-free fashion wear.
