= Anima Wilson =

Ghanaian politician

Hon. Anima Wilson
- President: John Dramani Mahama

Personal details
- Born: Ghana
- Party: NDC

Anima Wilson is a Ghanaian politician and a former deputy Ashanti Regional Minister of Ghana. He was appointed by President John Evan Atta Mills and served till January 2013.
