= Rosa Mundi =

Rosa Mundi may refer to:

- Rosa Mundi and other Love Songs, a 1906 collection of love poems written by Aleister Crowley to his wife
- Rosa Mundi (album), a 2001 album by June Tabor
- Rosa Mundi (group), a short-lived musical group from 1999
- a striped rose, a cultivar of Rosa gallica

== See also ==
- Rosamund, a girl's name
