= Anima Mundi (band) =

Music Band

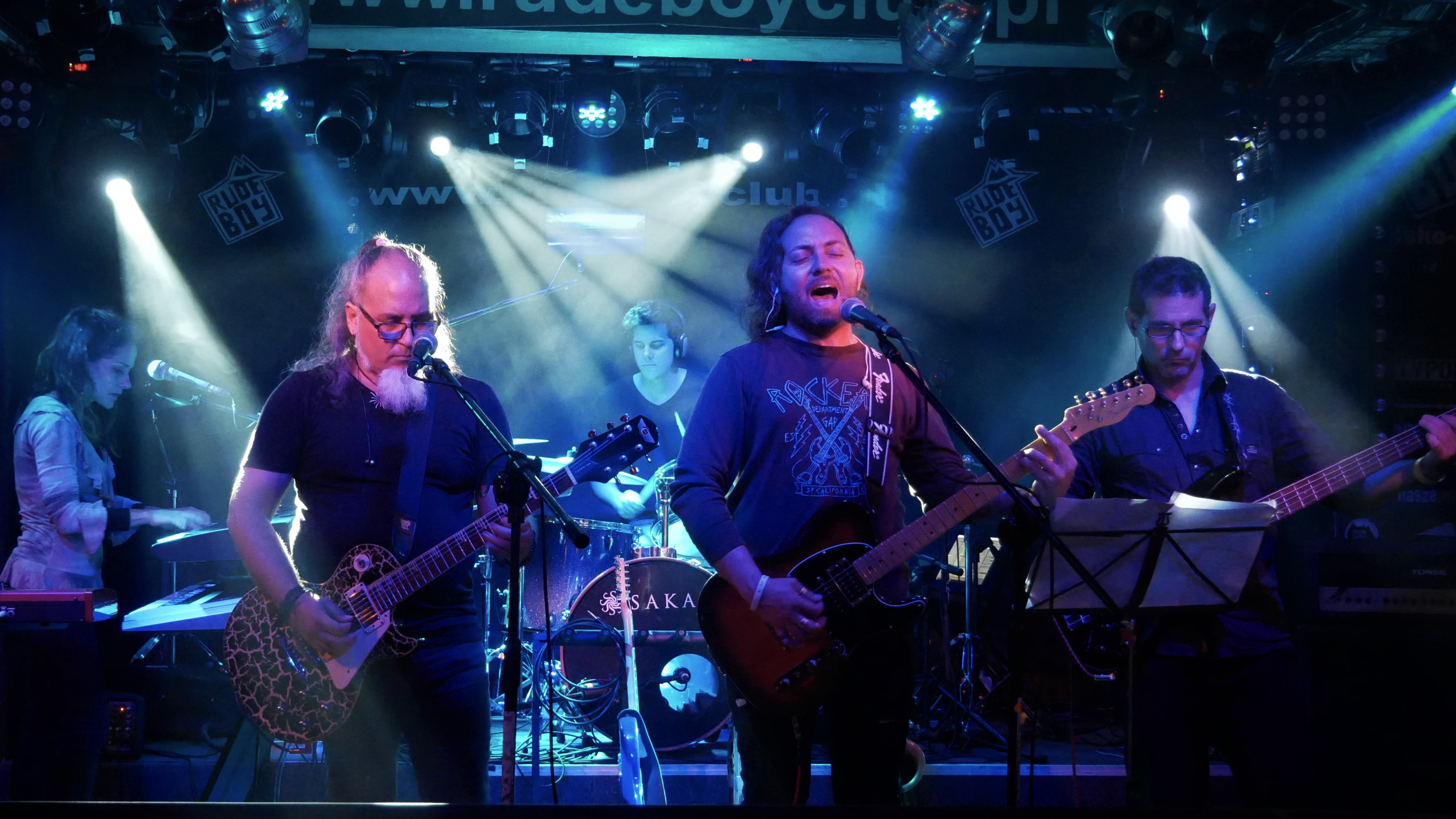

Background information
- Origin: Havana, Cuba
- Genres: New age, neo-prog, symphonic rock, progressive rock
- Years active: 1996–present
- Labels: Progressive Promotion Records, Anima Mundi Music, Mellow, Musea
- Members: Roberto Díaz; Virginia Peraza; Yaroski Corredera; Marco Alonso; Aivis Prieto Bauta
- Past members: Ariel Valdés; Abel González; Gustavo Comptis; Rolando Vigoa; Anaisy Gómez; Regis Rodríguez; Ariel Angel; Andremil Oropeza; Oswaldo Vieites; Carlos Sosa Denis; Emmanuel Pirko-Farrath; José Manuel Govin; Michel Bermudez
- Website: animamundimusic.com

Anima Mundi is a Cuban progressive rock band formed in 1996 that combines symphonic rock, new age, Celtic, space, and traditional Cuban music. Musically similar to the commercially successful British symphonic acts of the 1970s, the group incorporates multiple layers of synthesizer-led progressions with a rhythmic and percussive backdrop of sharp bass and polyphonic drumming while showcasing the virtuosity of lead synthesizers and guitar. Their songs are characterized by lengthy instrumental suites divided by vocal passages with surreal and spiritual lyrics.

Members include founders and vocalists Roberto Diaz on guitars and Virginia Peraza on keyboards, accompanied by Yaroski Corredera on bass, Aivis Prieto Bauta on lead vocals and Marco Alonso on drums. They have released six studio albums: Septentrión (2002), Jagannath Orbit (2008), The Way (2010), The Lamplighter (2013), I Me Myself (2016) and Insomnia (2018). The latter four enjoyed worldwide success and received positive reviews. In 2012, the band released a recorded performance of their first show in Helmond, The Netherlands, on dual CD/DVD, titled Live in Europe.Anima Mundi won three times – with the albums The Way, The Lamplighter and I me myself – the award for the best rock album of the year by Cubadisco (Cuban Grammy) organized by the Cuban Institute of Music.

== Discography ==
=== Septentrión (2002) ===
1. "Horizonte"
2. "Por Siempre"
3. "Centinela"
4. "Caleidoscopio"
5. "Peregrino del Tiempo"
6. "Mas Allá"
7. "La Montaña del Vigia"
8. "Las Praderas del Corazón"
9. "Tierra Invisible"
10. "El Hallazgo"
11. "El Umbral"
12. "Septentrión"

=== Jagannath Orbit (2008) ===
1. "We Are the Light"
2. "The Awaken Dreamer in the Soul Garden"
3. "Toward the Adventure"
4. "There's a Place not Faraway"
5. "Jagannath Orbit (in the Orbit of Love)"
6. "Rhythm of the Spheres"
7. "Sanctuary"

=== The Way (2010) ===
1. "Time to Understand"
2. "Spring Knocks on the Door of Men"
3. "Flying to the Sun"
4. "Cosmic Man"

=== The Lamplighter (2013) ===
"Suite The Lamplighter"

1. "On Earth Beneath The Stars"
2. "The Call and Farewell Song"
3. "Light the Lantern of your Heart"
4. "The Human House"

"Suite Tales from Endless Star"

1. "The dream Child Behind the Mask"
2. "The Return Part I"
3. "Endless Star"
4. "The Return Part II"

"Epilogue His Majesty Love"

=== I, Me, Myself (2016) ===
1. "The Chimney, the Wheel and the War"
  1. "Act I - Lullaby"
  2. "Act II - Round and Around"
  3. "Act III - Acid Skies"
  4. "Act IV - Wolf Affairs"
2. "Somewhere"
  1. "Act I - Toccata"
  2. "Act II - Where Chaos Sleeps"
3. "Flowers"
4. "Clockwork Heart"
5. "Train to Future"
  1. "Act I - Midnight Express"
  2. "Act II - Bridge to the Unknown"
  3. "Act III - I Was the One"
6. "Lone Rider"

=== Insomnia (2018) ===
1. "Citadel"
2. "Nine Swans"
3. "Electric Credo"
4. "The Hunter"
5. "Insomnia"
6. "Electric Dreams"
7. "The Wheel of Days"
8. "New Tribes Totem"
9. "Her Song"

== Discography Live ==
=== Live in Europe (2012) ===
CD1

1. "Time To Understand"
2. "Rhythm Of The Spheres"
3. "Sanctuary"
4. "La Montaña Del Vigia"

CD2

1. "Spring Knocks On The Door Of Men"
2. "Flying To The Sun"
3. "Cosmic Man"
4. "The Return"
5. "Firth Of Fifth (Excerpt)"

=== Once Upon A Live (2018) ===
CD1

1. "Mind Frontiers"
2. "Pandora Syndrome"
3. "The Chimney, The Wheel And The War"
4. "Somewhere"
5. "Artful Device Maker"
6. "Flowers"
7. "Nine Swans"
8. "Electric Credo"
9. "Clockwork Heart"

CD2

1. "Endless Star"
2. "Lone Rider"
3. "Train To Future"
4. "Time To Understand"
5. "Cosmic Man"

== DVD ==
=== Live in Europe (2012) ===
1. "Time To Understand"
2. "Rhythm Of The Spheres"
3. "Sanctuary"
4. "La Montaña Del Vigia"
5. "Spring Knocks On The Door Of Men"
6. "Flying To The Sun"
7. "Cosmic Man"
8. "The Return"
9. "Firth Of Fifth (Excerpt)"

=== Once Upon A Live (2018) ===
1. "Mind Frontiers"
2. "Pandora Syndrome"
3. "The Chimney, The Wheel And The War"
4. "Somewhere"
5. "Artful Device Maker"
6. "Flowers"
7. "Nine Swans"
8. "Electric Credo"
9. "Clockwork Heart"
10. "Endless Star"
11. "Lone Rider"
12. "Train To Future"
13. "Time To Understand"
14. "Cosmic Man"

== Gallery ==
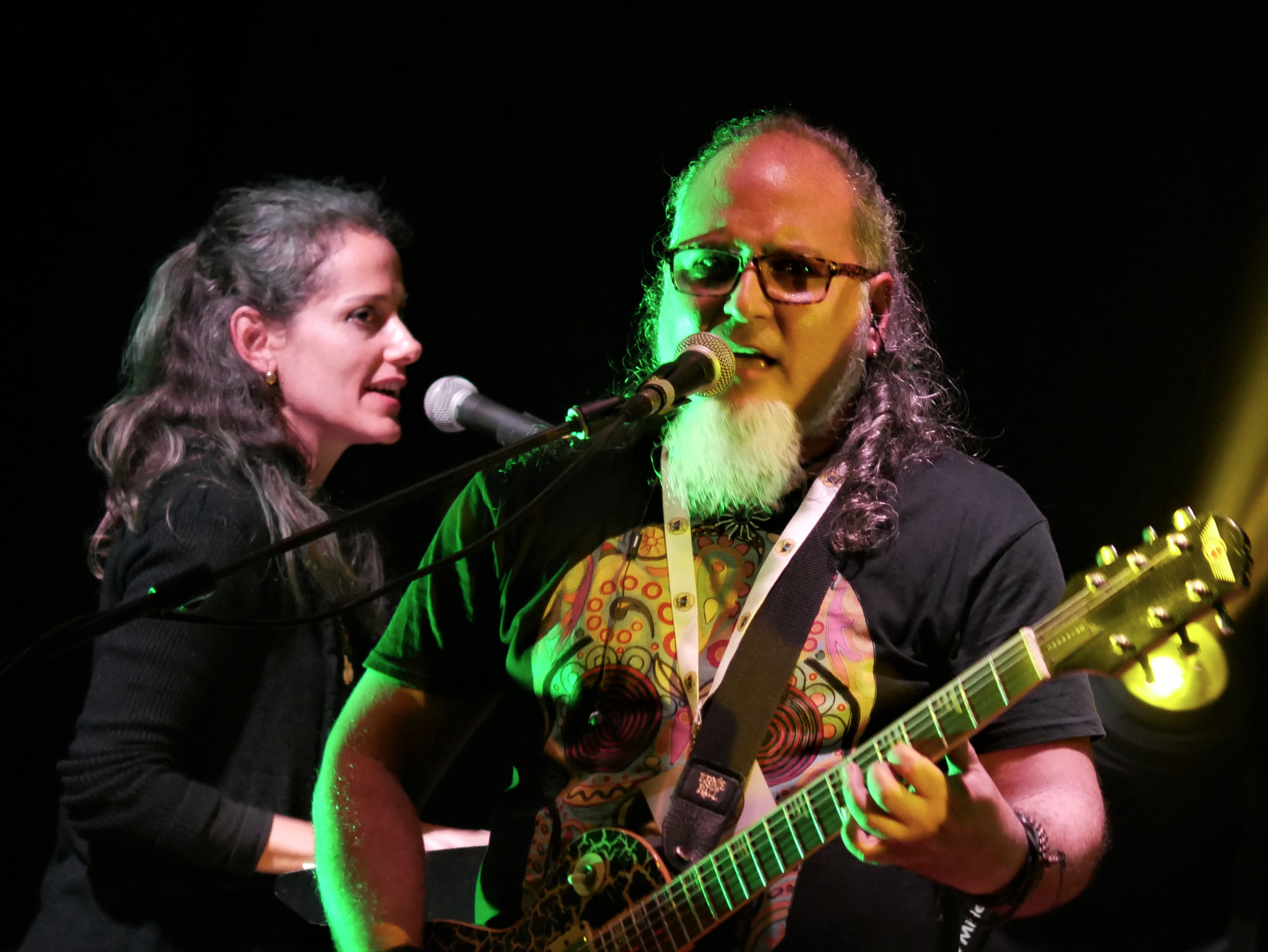

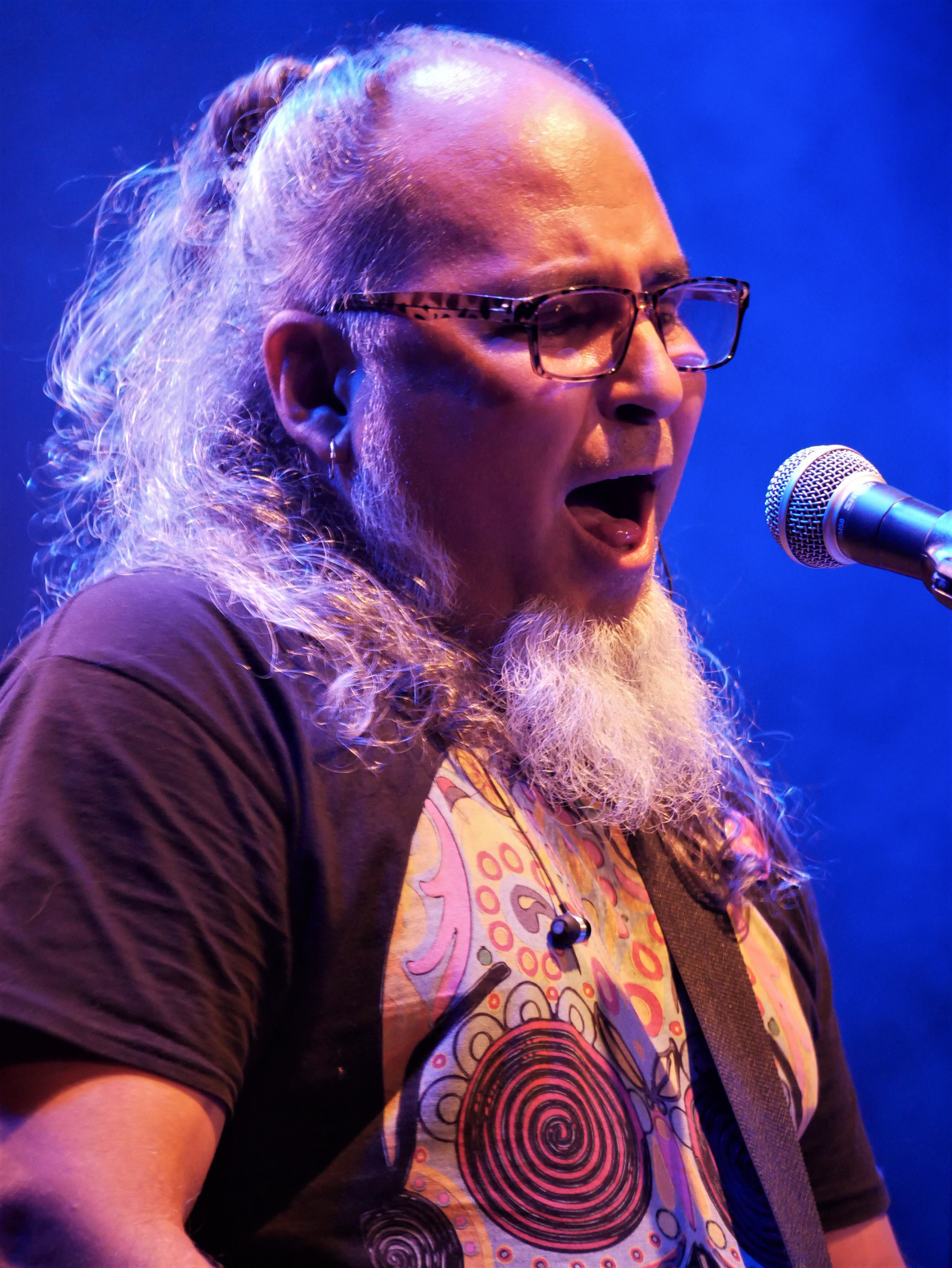

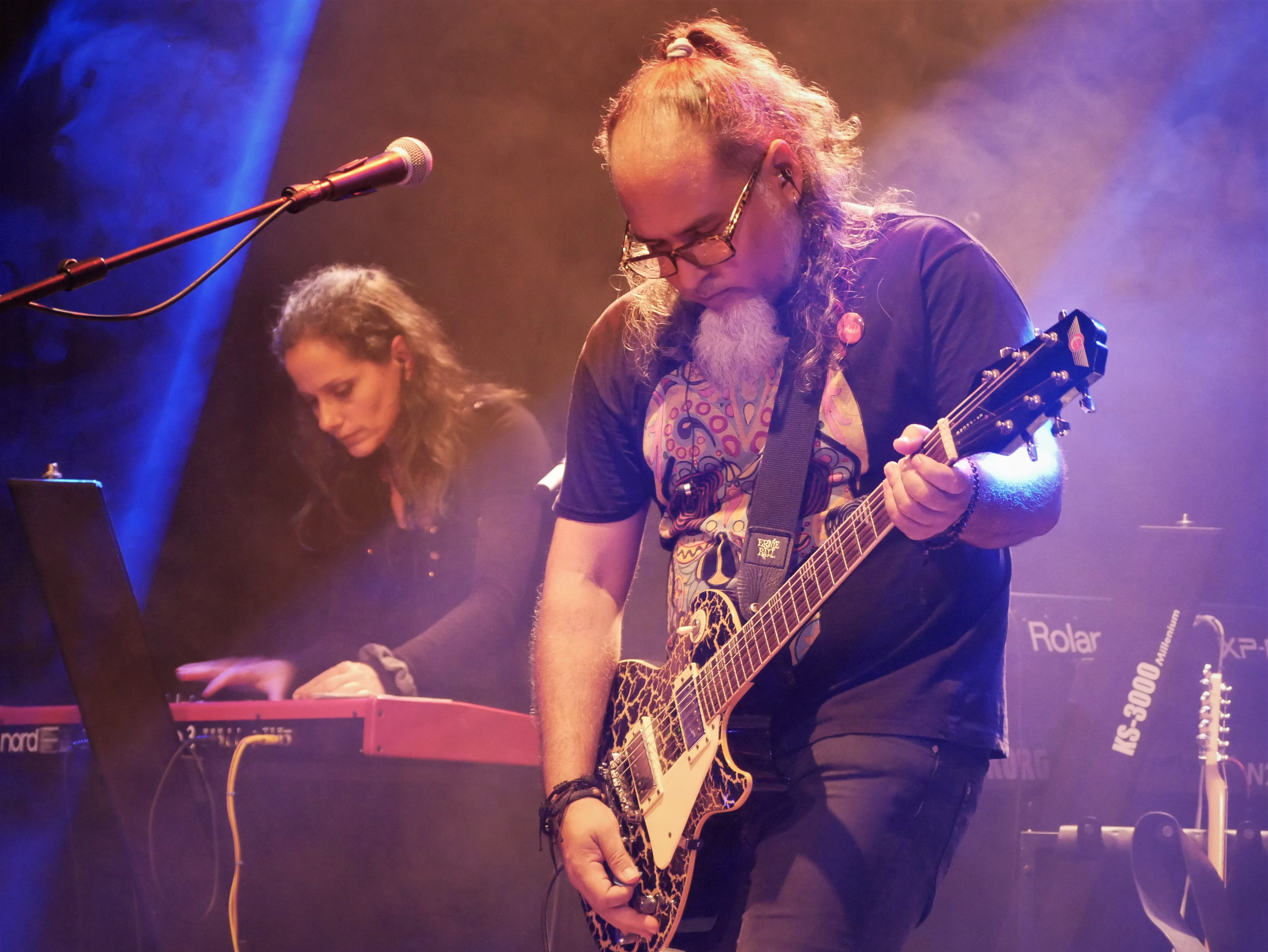

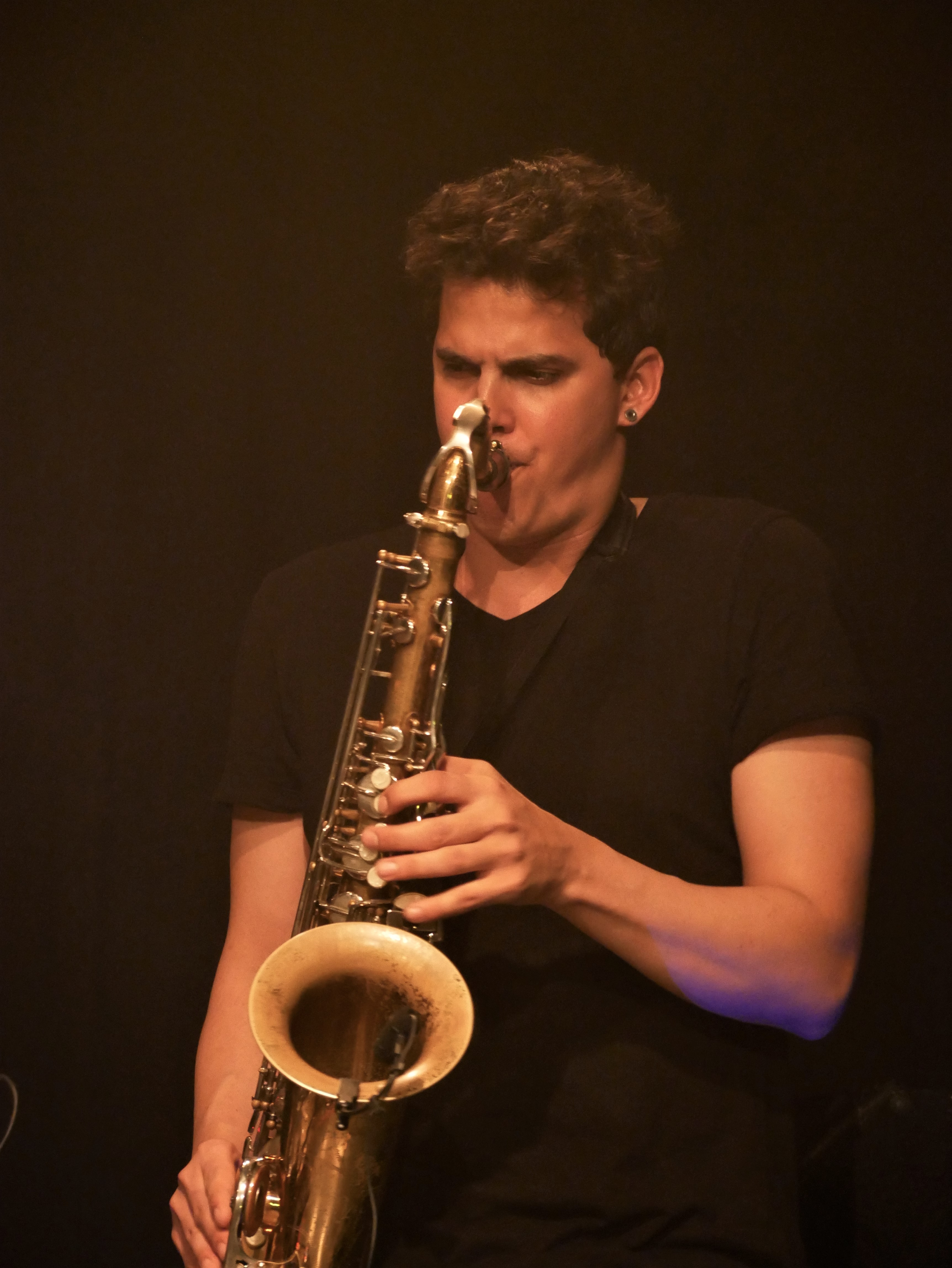

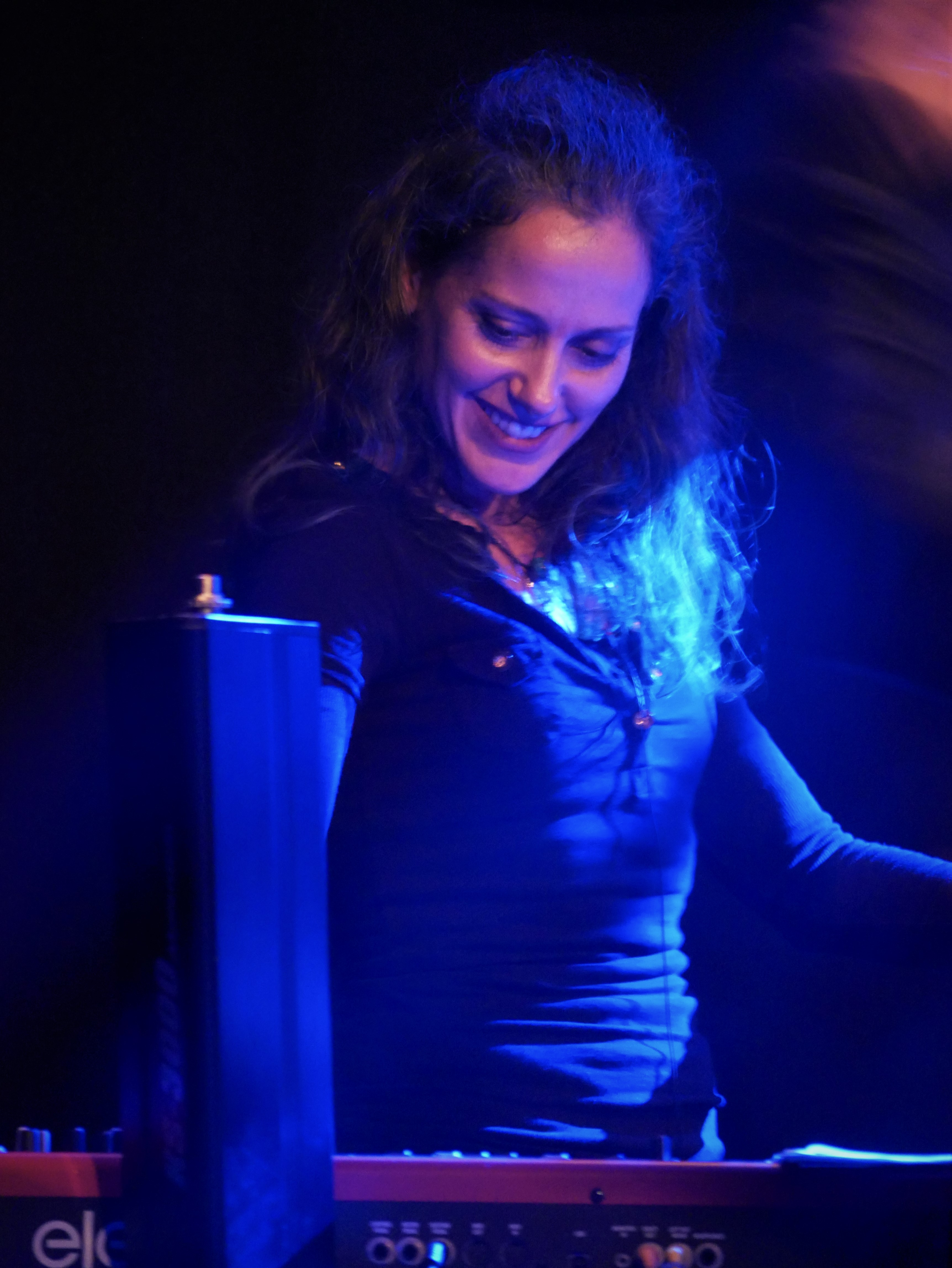

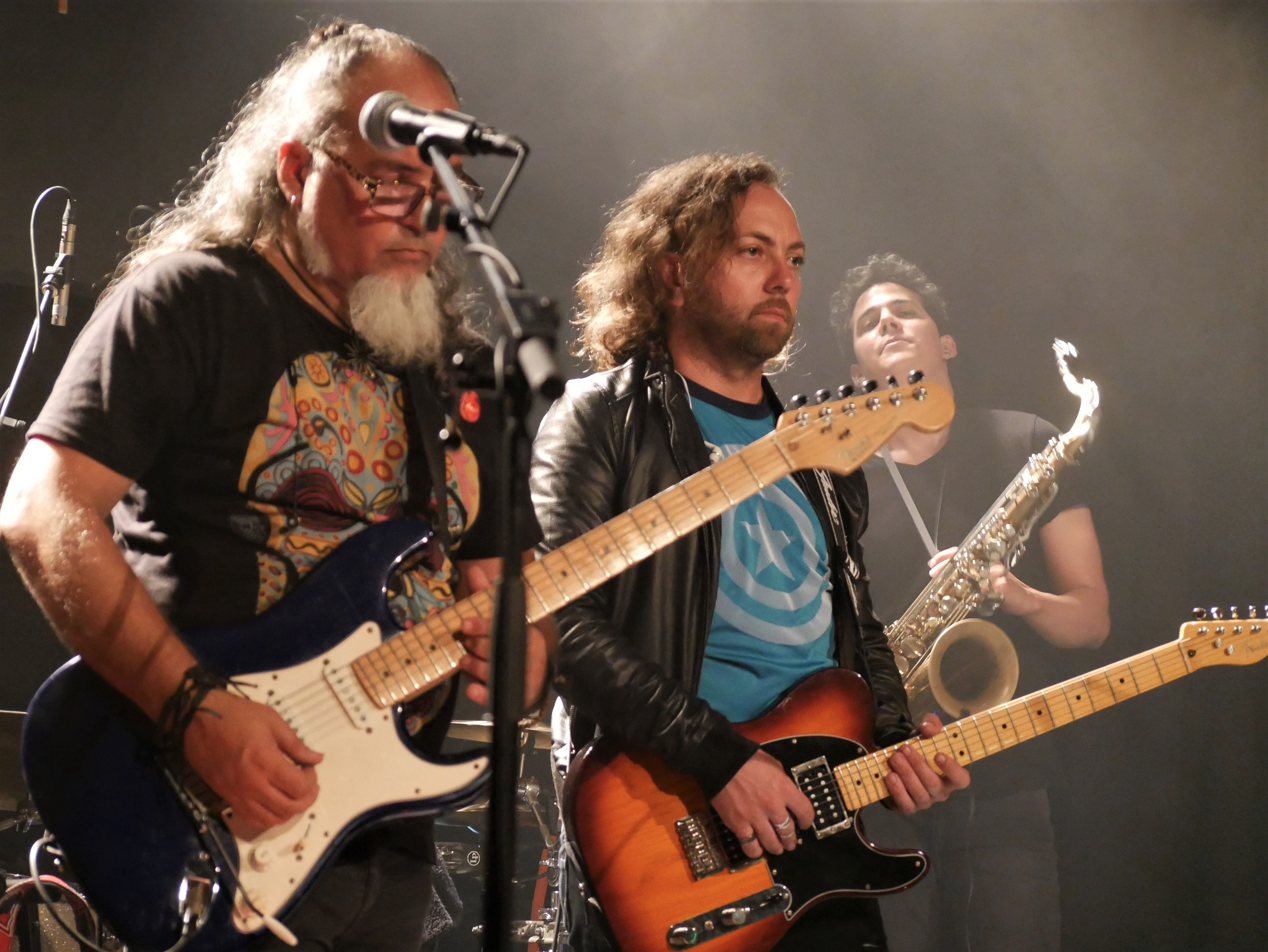

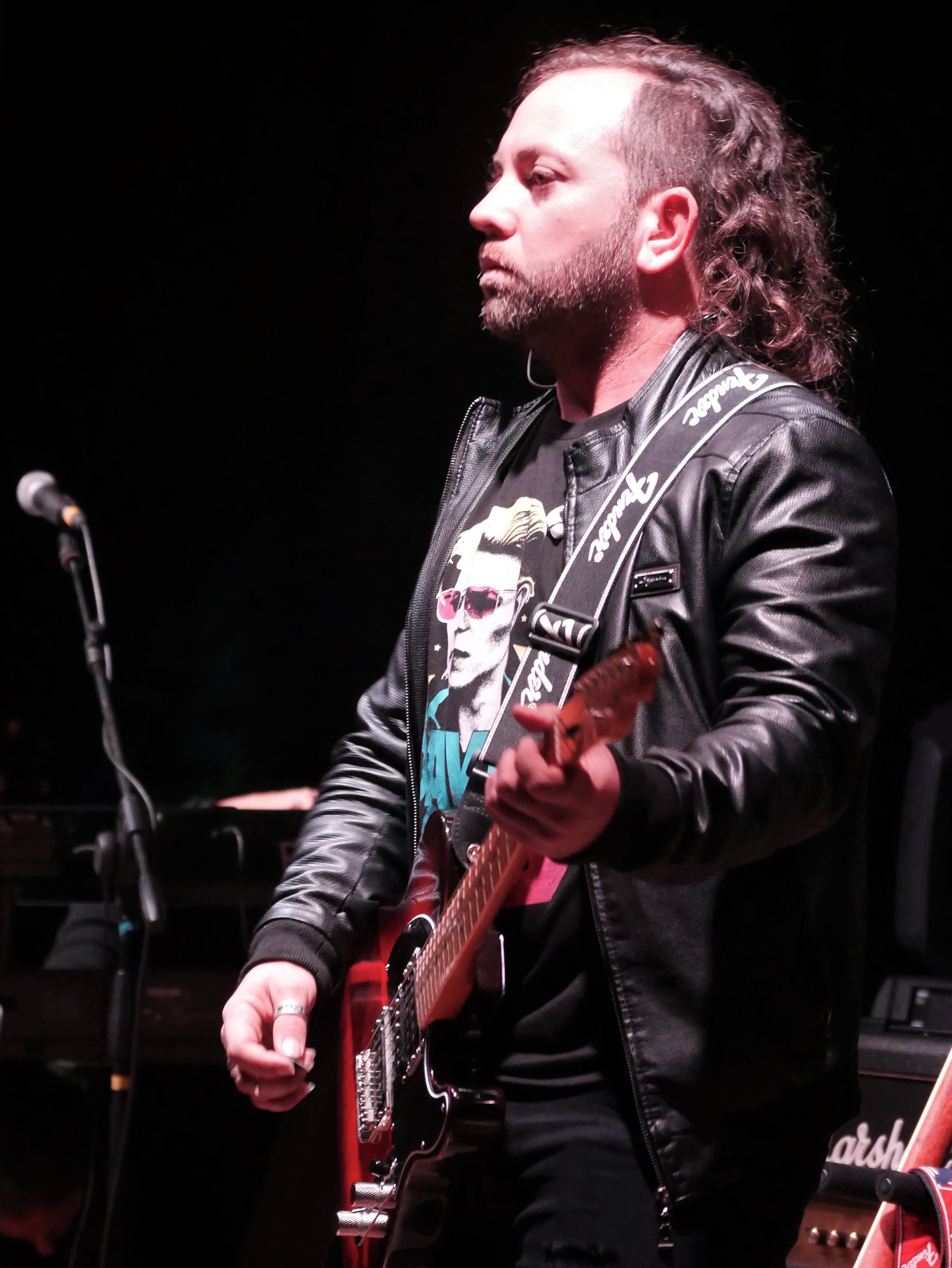
