= Anima Roy =

Anima Roy অণিমা রায়
- Origin: Bangladesh
- Genre: Rabindra Sangeet
- Occupations: Singer, professor
- Instrument: Singing
- Years active: 2009–present
- Spouse: Tanvir Tareq (m. 2010)

Anima Roy is a Bangladeshi Rabindra Sangeet singer and Professor of music at Jagannath University.

== Biography ==
Roy learned music from Debasish Chakrabarty, Sadhon Chandra Barman and Surbani Lalitakala Academy. Then she was trained under Waheedul Haq, Sanjida Khatun and Mita Haque. She completed a Rabindra Sangeet course from Chhayanaut.

In 2013, Roy joined the faculty at Jagannath University as a lecturer in the Department of Theatre and Music. Two years later, she was promoted to associate professor. By 2019, she was chair of the Department of Music, which had split from the Department of Theatre in 2016.

== Discography ==
- Kotha Jao (2009)
- Ami Chitrangada (2010)
- Icchamoti
- Robir Alo (2014)
- Tomaro Birohe
- Praner Majhe Aay (2015)
- Matribhumi (2016)

== Awards ==
Roy received the award for Rabindra Sangeet at the 12th Channel i Music Awards for her album Matribhumi.
