= Gum anima =

Pharmaceutical gum or resin

Gum anima, also called anima, anime, or animé, is a kind of gum or resin.

== Definition and description ==
According to an 1897 dictionary, the term could be used to refer to "several resins" known as elemi; copal produced by Hymenaea verrucosa; (Note: Then known as Trachylobium hornemannianum) a product of Hymenaera courbaril; or "Indian copal" produced by Vateria indica. The 1911 Encyclopædia Britannica, in contrast, mentions only that it can be used to refer to products of H. courbaril and H. verrucosa.

As of 1804 it was divided into two kinds, western and eastern. According to an 1897 dictionary, the eastern gum came first, and the western gum was called by the same name because of its similarity to the eastern. The western gum anima flows from an incision in a tree called courbaril; it is transparent, and of a pale brown color similar to frankincense. It has a sweeter smell than the eastern gum anima. As of 1804 it was notably sourced from Brazil.

The eastern gum anima was distinguished in 1728 into three kinds: the first white; the second blackish, in some respects like myrrh; the third pale, resinous, and dry. At some time before 1804 it was commonly brought to Europe from Ethiopia.

== Uses ==
All kinds of anima were used in perfumes around 1728, because of their agreeable smell; they were also been applied externally against colds. The 1911 Encyclopædia Britannica notes that the product of H. courbaril was used in perfumes at that time.

As of 2017, gum anima is often added to sandarac-based alcohol varnishes to prevent brittleness caused by the sandarac. Shellac and elemi are also often used for this purpose.
