= Anima Choudhury =

Indian singer

Anima Choudhury ড৹ অনিমা চৌধুৰী
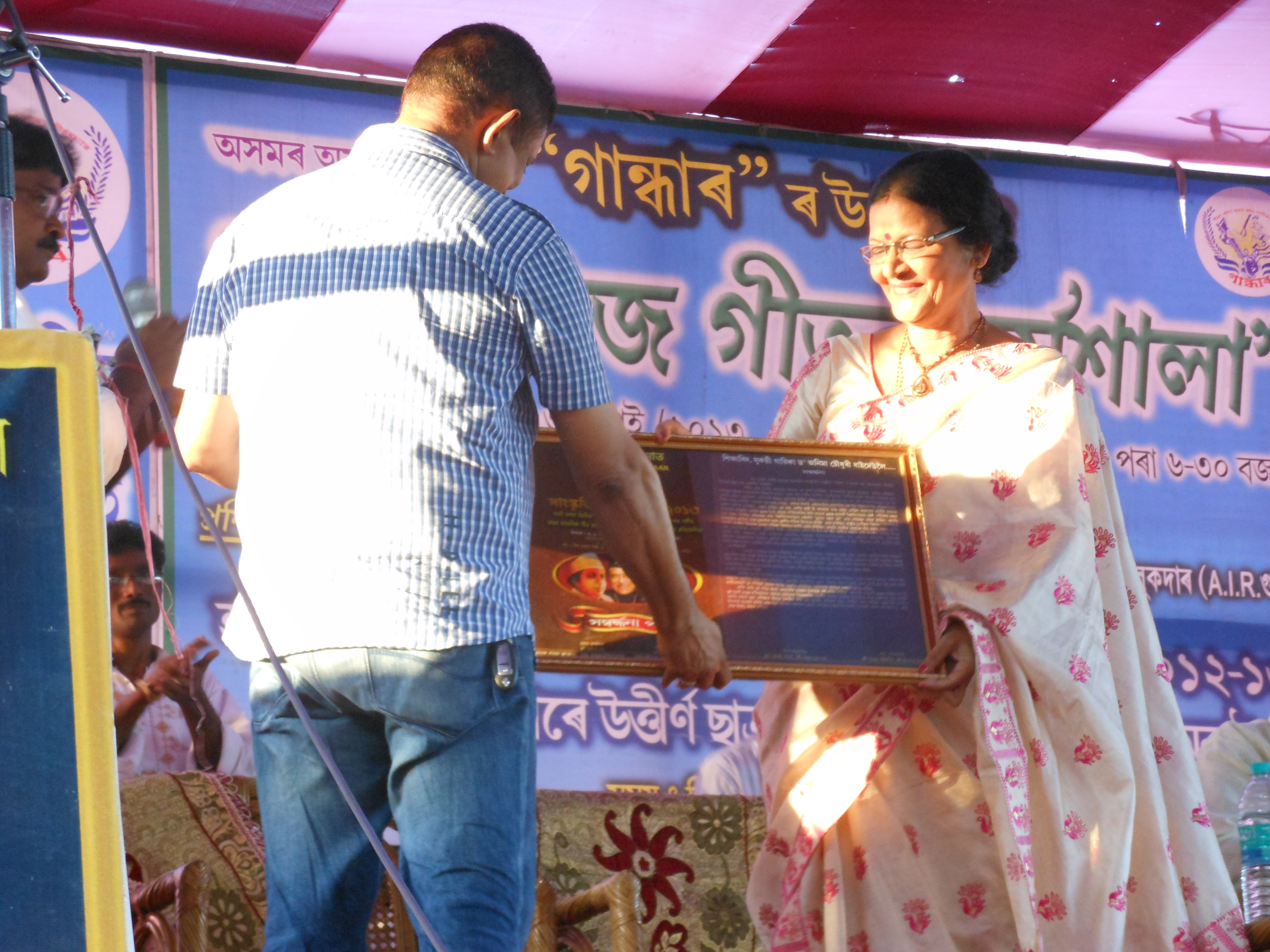

Background information
- Born: 28 February 1953 (age 73); Nalbari, Assam, India
- Origin: Assam
- Occupations: Singer, musician, professor
- Years active: 1970–present

Anima Choudhury (born 28 February 1953) is a singer from the Indian north eastern state of Assam. Her musical career over more than four decades has focussed on folk and modern Assamese songs. She has been awarded local and state level musical and cultural recognitions and titles including. "Luit Kuwari", and "Jan Dimali". Some of her most popular songs are 'Dikhou noir parore', 'Log diyar kotha asil' and 'E pran gopal'.

Supplementing her musical career, Choudhury has also led a parallel academic life, with a Doctorate degree in history conferred by Gauhati University.

== Early life ==
Choudhury was born on 28 February 1953 to Dandiram Choudhury and Hemalata Choudhury in a small village of Niz Pakowa, Nalbari Assam. Her father was a government officer posted at Nagaon for an extended period where the child was raised as the fifth child in a family of seven siblings. Her elementary education as well as her musical lessons started at Nagaon. Her household was full of musical influence and her mother began her early awareness of traditional Assamese music . Her father was a devotee of Indian classical music who encouraged her to get professional training in Hindustani classical music.

She received her early training in music at the music school of Sushil Banerjee. In 1963, when her father was transferred to Guwahati, she started training in classical music under Hiren Sarma. She eventually acquired Visharad in classical music. After Sarma's death, she continued her classical training under Damodar Bora. She also took training from classical singer Nirod Roy, and training in Thumri and Bhajan under Nripen Ganguli, a classical singer of All India Radio.

== Academic career ==
Choudhury graduated from Cotton College, Gauhati with Honors in History in 1972. She gota Masters in Arts degree from Gauhati University in History in 1974, and a Doctorate (PhD) degree from that university in 1999 for her thesis on "Temples and Shrines in and around Guwahati – A Sociological and Folkloristic Exploration". Until her retirement in 2013, she was Associate Professor and later as Head of Department of History at Chhaygaon College, Kamrup, Assam.

She has been invited to many International, national and state level seminars, and has presented research papers on several topics involving culture and music.

== Musical career ==
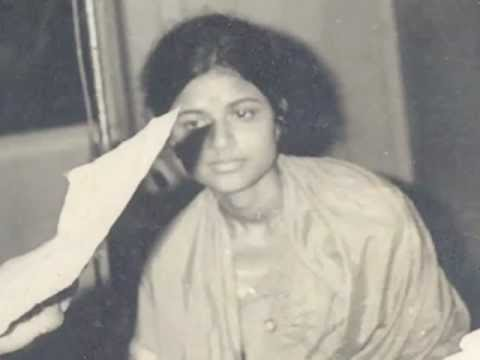
Choudhury in recording studio during early days of her career

In 1969, Choudhury participated in Cotton college's inter college music competition. Her performance in the statewide event caught the attention of music director Ramen Baruah. In 1970 Barua offered her an opportunity as a playback singer in the Assamese film Mukuta, singing all the female songs of the film. The songs became chart-busters all across Assam, specially the song "E pran gopal, Patila mayare khela" . After the success of the film, the record company His Master's Voice invited Choudhury to have songs and albums recorded under their label. She recorded several Assamese modern songs and Kamrupi Lokagit with His Master's Voice. She was a playback singer in other Assamese films including Putalaghar, Prem Janame Janame, Agnibristi (VDO Film), Mor Maramere (VCD), and Siba Mahima (VCD). She also provided playback singing for the Bengali film Tridhara in 2013, and has given her voice for TV serials Maa Manasa, Devi, Vandanand others.

Since her childhood, she been a regular voice in All India Radio, rendering performances first in 'Akanir Mel' and then in 'Chemoniar Chora'. In 1972 she became an AIR approved artist. Currently she is an 'A-Grade' artist of All India Radio and Doordarshan and performs regularly for AIR and Doordarshan, and also invited by other private TV channels. In 1989 she represented Assam in the National program of Doordarshan organized by Cuttak Doordarshan. She has been invited many by Indian/Assamese organizations in the United States to perform as an ambassador of the Assamese musical heritage.

== Awards and recognition ==
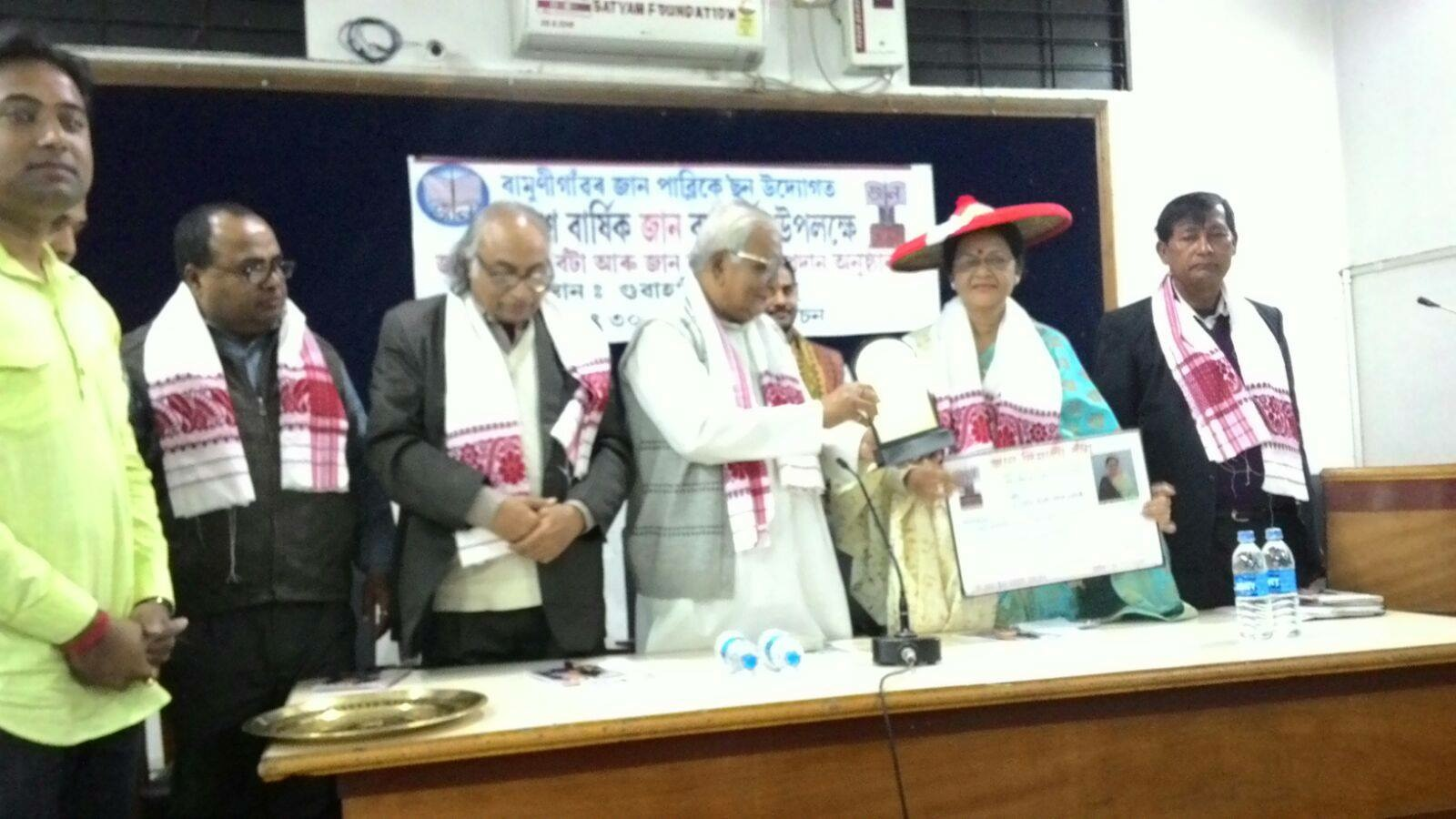
Choudhury honored as "Luit Kuwari" in 2016

- "Jaan Dimali Bota" 2016 by Jaan publication, Bamunigaon, Kamrup, Assam. She has been honored as "Luit Kuwari" as part of the felicitation.
- "Dr Upen Kakoti Sowarani Bota" 2016 by Dergaon Kendriya Rangali Bihu Utsav.
- "Xangkhadhwani Sanman" 2016 by Xangkhadhwani Samajik Sanskritik Mancha Kahilipara, Guwahati.
- 'LIFETIME ACHIEVEMENT AWARD, 2019' BY 'BASHANTAR EDIN' at Niz Pakowa, Nalbari.

On 2 February 2013, Chhaygaon College organized an inter college competition on Choudhury's modern songs where competitors across Assam from several colleges under Gauhati University participated. Similarly, the cultural organization Jontara Kalakendra organized a program called 'Anubhab Mor Pritir Smriti' to honor her at Bejera.

She was adjudged the best singer of Cotton College for the period 1969–70. She became the best singer of Gauhati University in the year 1973. While in the university, she was the first recipient of the 'Brajen Baruah Award' which had been instituted by the Directorate of Youth Welfare, Gauhati University. Jontara Kalakendra.

== Musical works ==
Following is the list of audio albums released during Choudhury's career.

=== Assamese modern songs ===
- Asolore Baa
- Tezimola Xare Ase
- Pritir Smriti (Vol I & ll)
- Smriti Anupom
- Ai Tor Pujar Bedi
- Hiya Jui
- Madhoi Maloti
- Ei Bohagote
- Supohi
- Ramdhenu
- Kokal Bhangi Nach
- Jaan
- Majoni
- Sapon
- Nirabadhi

=== Folk songs ===
- Xubash
- Amol Mol
- Maniki Madhuri
- Surar Jinjiri
- O Bandhure (Goalporia)
- Ram Nam Porene Monot
- Antaryami
- Tupuni
- Manjori
- Pran Gopal
- Pushpanjoli
- Mohon Kanai
- Bhakti Sagar
- Bin Borage

=== Bargit ===
- Madhura Murati
- Ram Name Mukuti

=== Biyanaam ===
- Anima Choudhury r Biyanam
- Na Kaina
- Sukanya
- Ajoli Boari
- Prabhati Kanya

=== Jyoti Sangit ===
- Jyotir Gaan
- Agnixur Volume III
- Sonar Xarai

=== Bishnu Rabhar Geet ===
- Agnixur Volume VI
- Uti Ja Rupali Nao

=== Bihu ===
- Jiyori
- Patgabharu
- Nayantora
