= La Quinta Formation, Mexico =

Geologic formation in Mexico

La Quinta Formation
- Stratigraphic range: Late Oligocene – Early Miocene 24–20 Ma
- Type: Geological Formation
- Unit of: Simojovel Group
- Sub-units: See: Members
- Underlies: Mazantic Shale
- Overlies: Rancho Berlin Sandstone
- Thickness: 2,900 ft (880 m)

Lithology
- Primary: Sandstone

Location
- Region: Chiapas
- Country: Mexico

La Quinta Formation, sometimes referred to as the Simojovel Formation, is a geological formation in Chiapas, Simojovel in Mexico, deposited during the Late Oligocene into the early Miocene. It is the oldest known formation where Mexican amber can be found.

== Geology ==
The La Quinta Formation is a part of the larger Simojovel Group, and can be found outcropping near Chiapas in Mexico. It is overlain by the Mazantic Shale, whilst it is underlain by the Rancho Berlin Sandstone.

=== Members ===
The La Quinta Formation is composed of three fossiliferous members, which are as follows, in stratigraphic order (lowest to highest):

- Camino Carretero Member: This member, known to get up to 2,650 ft (810 m) in thickness, is primarily composed of various sandstones. Some of the sandstone layers are noted to be cemented with calcium carbonate, whilst non-calcareous sandstones layers range from brown-ochre to grey weather limoitic fine-grained, alternating massive to thin-bedded fine to coarse-grained brown weathering, coarse-grained arkosic, blue-grey to buff-micaceous fine-grained buff to brown weathering, and buff medium-grained micaceous buff to ochre weathering tuffaceous medium-grained with inter-bedded calcareous rocks. Towards the upper 800 ft (240 m) of the member, the various sandstones give way to tuffaceous sandstones, ranging from buff to limonitic or red tuffaceous sandstone, which is inter-bedded with siltstone, to massive silty medium-grained micaceous tuffaceous limonitic weathering sandstone. Throughout this member, shales are also present, starting as a blue-grey calcareous shale in the lower sections of the member, giving way to sandy shale, buff to micaceous-green shale, buff-micaceous silty ochre weathering shale, fissule limonitic shale, and reddish-brown fissile shale towards the middle sections, although almost become completely absent in the upper sections, save for a layer of dark-grey to black shale. Siltstones are also common within the lower sections of the member, ranging from sandy siltstone, buff to ochre-micaceous siltstone, tan siltstone with inter-bedded marly, tan to dark green-grey weathering siltstone to fine-grained sandstone, blue-grey to brown calcareous siltstone to fine-grained sandstone, tuffaceous massive grey limonitic weathering siltstone to medium-grained sandstone, and minor tuffaceous limonitic weathering sandy siltstones. Limestones can also be found, although it is notably uncommon, only being found as thin layers in the lower and upper sections of member.
- Florida Limestone Member: This member, known to get up to 150 ft (46 m) in thickness, is predominately composed of silty limestone, calcareous shale, sandy limestone. In other outcroppings, the member is also composed of algal limestone, lignitic limestone, and massive white limestone.
- Finca Carmitto Member: This member, which is roughly 100 ft (30 m) thick, is primarily composed of sandy pebble conglomerate in its lower section, whilst in the upper section it is composed of dark-grey to black rubbly shale and thin light buff-whitish weathering medium-grained calcareous sandstone, which is laminated in nature.

== Dating ==
Using U–Pb dating on zircon samples collected from around the upper amber bearing sections, the Mexican amber biota of the La Quinta Formation was constrained to between 24 Ma and 20 Ma.

== Paleobiota ==
The biota of the La Quinta Formation is primarily composed of various arthropods, from wasps such as Hyptia deansi, to ostracods as Thalassocypria. It is also home to a wide variety of plants, such as the fabacid Simojoflorum mijangosii.

Color key: Taxon / Reclassified taxon / Taxon falsely reported as present / Dubious taxon or junior synonym / Ichnotaxon / Ootaxon / Morphotaxon	Notes; Uncertain or tentative taxa are in small text; ~~crossed out~~ taxa are discredited.

=== Insecta ===
Genus	Species	Notes	Images
Hyptia	H. deansi	Ensign wasp.	
Schwenckfeldina	S. archoica	Fungus gnat.	
Mastotermes	M. electromexicus	Termite.	
Termitaradus	T. protera	Termite bug.	
Aphaenogaster	A. praerelicta	Ant.	
Dicromantispa	D. electromexicana	Mantidfly.	
Leptopharsa	L. tacanae	Lace bug.	
Trichoribates	T. roynortoni	Ceratozetid mite.	
Erpetogomphus	E. shii	Gomphid dragonfly.	
Argia	Argia sp.	Coenagrionid dragonfly.	
Eulaema	E. (Apeulaema) zigrasi	Apid bee.	

=== Ostracoda ===
Genus	Species	Notes	Images
Thalassocypria	T. cumangulus; T. electri; T. resinae; T. nicokaraszi	Candonid ostracods.	
Paracypria	P. inujimensis	Candonid ostracod.	
Parapontoparta	Parapontoparta sp.; P. lagranjae	Candonid ostracods.	
Dolerocypria (?)	D. (?) robinsmithi	Candonid ostracod.	
Hemicypris	Hemicypris sp.	Cypridid ostracod.	
Edessa	E. protera	Pentatomid insect.	

=== Copepoda ===
Genus	Species	Notes	Images
Cletocamptus (?)	Cletocamptus (?) sp.	Harpacticoid copepod.	
Enhydrosoma	Enhydrosoma sp.	Harpacticoid copepod.	
Darcythompsonia	Darcythompsonia sp.	Harpacticoid copepod.	
Leptocaris	Leptocaris sp.	Harpacticoid copepod.	

=== Nematoda ===
Genus	Species	Notes	Images
Oligaphelenchoides	O. atrebora	Aphelenchoidid nematode.	
Oligodiplogaster	O. antiqua	Diplogasterid nematode.	
Vetus	V. robustus	Rhabditid nematode.	

=== Cnidaria ===
Genus	Species	Notes	Images
Colpophyllia	C. willoughbiensis	Mussid coral.	
Goniopora	G. hilli	Poritid coral.	
Porites	P. anguillensis; P. portoricensis; P. waylandi	Poritid coral.	
Siderastrea	S. conferta	Siderastreid coral.	
Acropora	A. panamensis	Acroporid coral.	
Diploastrea	D. crassolamellata	Diploastraeid coral.	
Antiguastrea	A. cellulosa	Merulinid coral.	
Goniastrea	G. canalis	Merulinid coral.	
Montastraea	M. canalis; M. endothecata	Montastraeid coral.	

=== Flora ===
Genus	Species	Notes	Images
Hymenaea	H. mexicana; H. allendis	Legume fabacids.	
Simojoflorum	S. mijangosii	Mimosoid fabacid.	
Acacia	Acacia sp.	Mimosoid fabacid.	
Crudia	Crudia sp.	Detarioid fabacids.	
Cedrela	Cedrela sp.	Meliacid angiosperm.	
Guarea	Guarea sp.	Meliacid angiosperm.	
Pelliciera	Pelliciera sp.	Tetrameristacid angiosperm.	
Rhizophora	Rhizophora sp.	Rhizophoracid angiosperm.	
Tapiriraizophora	T. durhamii	Anacardiacid angiosperm.	
Ilex	Ilex sp.	Aquifoliacid angiosperm.	
Staphylea	S. ochoterenae	Staphyleacid angiosperm.	
Swietenia	S. miocenica	Meliacid angiosperm.	
Picea	Picea sp.	Pinacid spruce tree pollen.	
Pinus (?)	Pinus (?) sp.	Pinacid spruce tree pollen.	
Podocarpus	Podocarpus sp.	Podocarpacid tree pollen.	
Selaginella	Selaginella sp.	Selaginellacid lycophyte pollen.	
Sphaeropteris	Sphaeropteris sp.	Cyatheacid tree fern pollen.	
Ceratopteris	Ceratopteris sp.	Pteridacid fern pollen.	
Pteris	Pteris sp.	Pteridacid fern pollen.	
Antrophyum	Antrophyum sp.	Vittarioid fern pollen.	
Cryosophila	Cryosophila sp.	Coryphoid palm tree pollen. Misspelled as Crysophila in Graham, 1999.	

=== Undetermined ===
Genus	Species	Notes	Images
Cletodidae copepod	Cletodidae sp.	Harpacticoid copepod of uncertain affinities, although is assignable to the family Cletodidae.	
Laophontidae copepod	Laophontidae sp.	Harpacticoid copepod of uncertain affinities, although is assignable to the family Laophontidae.	
Ectinosomatidae (?) copepod	Ectinosomatidae (?) sp.	Harpacticoid copepod of uncertain affinities, tentatively is assignable to the family Ectinosomatidae.	
Palmae type 1	???	Palm tree pollen of unknown affinity.	
Aguiaria type	???	Bombacacid pollen of unknown affinity, bears similarities to Aguiaria.	
Ericaceae pollen	???	Ericacid pollen of unknown affinity.	
Juglandaceae pollen	???	Juglandacid pollen of uncertain affinity, either assignable to Alfaroa or Oreomunnea.	
Myrtaceae pollen	???	Myrtacid pollen of uncertain affinity, either assignable to Eugenia or Myrcia.	
Unknown 1 - 5	???	Pollens of unknown affinity.	

== See also ==
- List of fossiliferous stratigraphic units in Mexico
- 2017 in arthropod paleontology
