= List of Leptopharsa species =

This is a list of 116 species in Leptopharsa, a genus of lace bugs in the family Tingidae.

== Leptopharsa species ==
- Leptopharsa albella Drake, 1935^{i c g}
- Leptopharsa angustata (Champion, 1897)^{i c g}
- Leptopharsa aporia Drake and Ruhoff, 1965^{i c g}
- Leptopharsa arta Drake and Poor, 1942^{i c g}
- Leptopharsa artocarpi Drake and Hambleton, 1938^{i c g}
- Leptopharsa atibaiae Drake and Ruhoff, 1962^{i c g}
- Leptopharsa avia Drake, 1953^{i c g}
- Leptopharsa bifasciata (Champion, 1897)^{i c}
- Leptopharsa bondari Drake and Poor, 1939^{i c g}
- Leptopharsa bradleyi (Drake, 1931)^{i c g}
- Leptopharsa bredini Froeschner, 1968^{i c g}
- Leptopharsa callangae Drake and Poor, 1940^{i c g}
- Leptopharsa calopa Drake, 1928^{i c g}
- Leptopharsa clitoriae (Heidemann, 1911)^{i c g}
- Leptopharsa cognata Drake and Hambleton, 1934^{i c g}
- Leptopharsa constricta (Champion, 1897)^{i c g}
- Leptopharsa dampfi (Drake, 1927)^{i c g}
- Leptopharsa dapsilis Drake and Hambleton, 1945^{i c g}
- Leptopharsa deca Drake and Hambleton, 1945^{i c g}
- Leptopharsa decens Drake and Hambleton, 1938^{i c g}
- Leptopharsa deides Drake & Ruhoff, 1965^{c g}
- Leptopharsa delicata Monte, 1945^{i c g}
- Leptopharsa difficilis Drake and Hambleton, 1938^{i c g}
- Leptopharsa dilaticollis (Champion, 1897)^{i c g}
- Leptopharsa distans Drake, 1928^{c g}
- Leptopharsa distantis Drake, 1928^{i g}
- Leptopharsa distinconis Drake, 1928^{i c g}
- Leptopharsa divisa (Champion, 1897)^{i c g}
- Leptopharsa elata (Champion, 1897)^{i c g}
- Leptopharsa elegans (Hacker, 1927)^{i c g}
- Leptopharsa elegantula Stål, 1873^{i c g}
- Leptopharsa enodata Drake, 1942^{i c g}
- Leptopharsa euprines Drake and Ruhoff, 1965^{i c g}
- Leptopharsa evsyunini Golub and Popov, 2000^{i g}
- Leptopharsa farameae Drake and Hambleton, 1938^{i c g}
- Leptopharsa fici Drake and Hambleton, 1938^{i c g}
- Leptopharsa fimbriata (Champion, 1897)^{i c g}
- Leptopharsa firma Drake and Hambleton, 1938^{i c g}
- Leptopharsa flava Monte, 1940^{i c g}
- Leptopharsa forsteroniae Drake and Hambleton, 1938^{i c g}
- Leptopharsa fortis Drake and Hambleton, 1934^{i c g}
- Leptopharsa frater Golub and Popov, 2003^{i g}
- Leptopharsa furcata (Stål, 1873)^{i c g}
- Leptopharsa furculata (Champion, 1897)^{i c g}
- Leptopharsa fuscofasciata (Champion, 1897)^{i c g}
- Leptopharsa gibbicarina Froeschner, 1977^{i c g}
- Leptopharsa gracilenta (Champion, 1897)^{i c g}
- Leptopharsa guatemalensis Drake and Poor, 1939^{i c g}
- Leptopharsa heidemanni (Osborn & Drake, 1916)^{i c g b}
- Leptopharsa heveae Drake and Poor, 1935^{i c g}
- Leptopharsa hintoni Drake, 1938^{i c g}
- Leptopharsa hoffmani Drake, 1928^{i c g}
- Leptopharsa hyaloptera (Stål, 1873)^{i c g}
- Leptopharsa ignota Drake and Hambleton, 1934^{i c g}
- Leptopharsa inannana Drake, 1953^{i c g}
- Leptopharsa inaudita Drake and Hambleton, 1938^{i c g}
- Leptopharsa jubaris Drake and Hambleton, 1945^{i c g}
- Leptopharsa laureata Drake and Hambleton, 1945^{i c g}
- Leptopharsa lauta Drake and Hambleton, 1945^{i c g}
- Leptopharsa lenatis Drake, 1930^{i c g}
- Leptopharsa lineata (Champion, 1897)^{i c g}
- Leptopharsa livida Monte, 1943^{i c g}
- Leptopharsa longipennis (Champion, 1897)^{i c g}
- Leptopharsa luxa Drake and Hambleton, 1945^{i c g}
- Leptopharsa machaerii Drake and Hambleton, 1934^{i c g}
- Leptopharsa machalana Drake and Hambleton, 1946^{i c g}
- Leptopharsa madrigali Froeschner, 1989^{i c g}
- Leptopharsa marginella (Stål, 1858)^{i c g}
- Leptopharsa miconiae Drake and Hambleton, 1938^{i c g}
- Leptopharsa milleri Drake, 1954^{c g}
- Leptopharsa mira Drake and Hambleton, 1934^{i c g}
- Leptopharsa modica Drake and Hambleton, 1939^{i c g}
- Leptopharsa nota Drake and Hambleton, 1938^{i c g}
- Leptopharsa oblonga (Say, 1825)^{i c g b}
- Leptopharsa ocoteae Drake and Hambleton, 1938^{i c g}
- Leptopharsa ogloblini Drake, 1936^{i c g}
- Leptopharsa ornata Monte, 1940^{i c g}
- Leptopharsa ovantis Drake and Hambleton, 1945^{i c g}
- Leptopharsa pacis Drake and Hambleton, 1939^{i c g}
- Leptopharsa pallens Monte, 1943^{i c g}
- Leptopharsa papella Drake, 1941^{i c g}
- Leptopharsa partita (Champion, 1898)^{i c g}
- Leptopharsa paulana Drake, 1953^{i c g}
- Leptopharsa pensa Drake and Hambleton, 1939^{i c g}
- Leptopharsa perbona Drake, 1930^{i c g}
- Leptopharsa peruensis Drake, 1928^{i c g}
- Leptopharsa poinari Golub and Popov, 2000^{i g}
- Leptopharsa posoqueriae Drake and Hambleton, 1938^{i c g}
- Leptopharsa principis Drake and Hambleton, 1938^{i c g}
- Leptopharsa probala Drake and Hambleton, 1938^{i c g}
- Leptopharsa psychotriae Drake and Hambleton, 1939^{i c g}
- Leptopharsa pudens Drake and Hambleton, 1938^{i c g}
- Leptopharsa ralla Drake, 1963^{i c g}
- Leptopharsa reflexa Froeschner, 1989^{i c g}
- Leptopharsa retrusa Drake and Hambleton, 1939^{i c g}
- Leptopharsa reuniona Drake, 1957^{c g}
- Leptopharsa rudgeae Drake and Hambleton, 1934^{i c g}
- Leptopharsa rumiana Drake and Hambleton, 1946^{i c g}
- Leptopharsa ruris Drake, 1942^{i c g}
- Leptopharsa satipona Drake and Hambleton, 1944^{i c g}
- Leptopharsa sera Drake and Poor, 1939^{i c g}
- Leptopharsa setigera (Champion, 1897)^{i c g}
- Leptopharsa siderea Drake and Hambleton, 1946^{i c g}
- Leptopharsa simulans (Stål, 1858)^{i c g}
- Leptopharsa sobrina Monte, 1940^{i c g}
- Leptopharsa tacanae Coty, Garrouste and Nel, 2014^{i g}
- Leptopharsa tenuatis Drake, 1928^{i c g}
- Leptopharsa tenuis (Champion, 1897)^{i c g}
- Leptopharsa unicarinata Champion, 1897^{i c g}
- Leptopharsa usingeri Drake, 1938^{i c g}
- Leptopharsa valida Drake and Hambleton, 1938^{i c g}
- Leptopharsa variegata Monte, 1943^{i c g}
- Leptopharsa velifer (McAtee, 1917)^{i c g}
- Leptopharsa vicina Drake and Poor, 1939^{i c g}
- Leptopharsa vittipennis (Stål, 1873)^{i c g}
- Leptopharsa zeteki Drake, 1939^{i c g}

Data sources: i = ITIS, c = Catalogue of Life, g = GBIF, b = Bugguide.net
