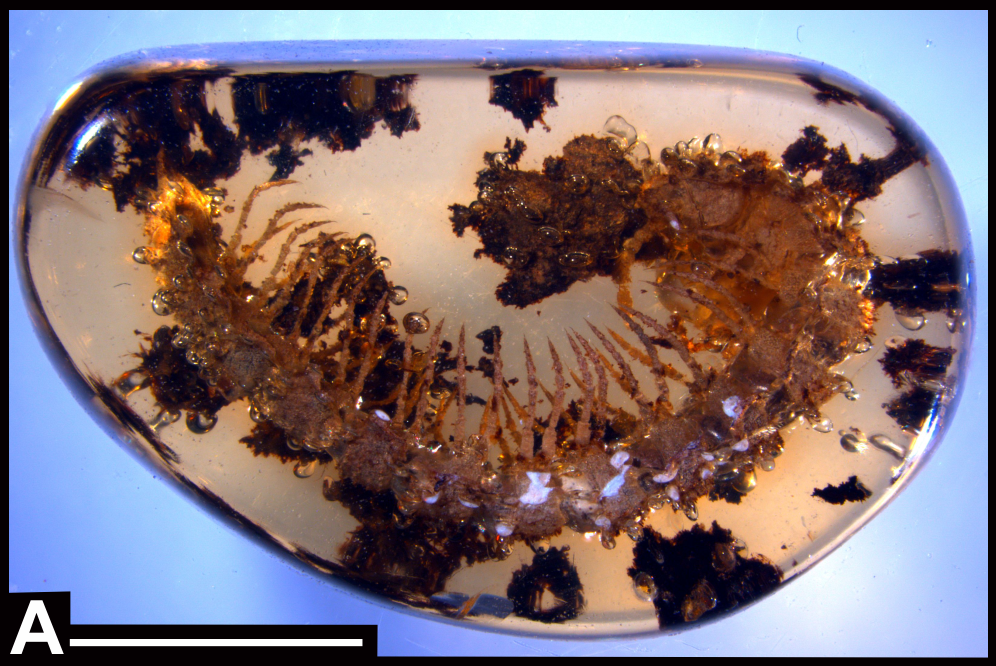
- A. adamantis holotype

Scientific classification
- Kingdom: Animalia
- Phylum: Arthropoda
- Subphylum: Myriapoda
- Class: Diplopoda
- Order: Polydesmida
- Family: Platyrhacidae
- Genus: †Anbarrhacus
- Species: †A. adamantis

Binomial name
- †Anbarrhacus adamantis Riquelme & Hernández, 2014

= Anbarrhacus =

Anbarrhacus Temporal range: Early – Middle Miocene

Extinct genus of millipedes

Anbarrhacus is an extinct genus of millipede in the family Platyrhacidae known from a fossil found in North America. There is one described species in the genus, Anbarrhacus adamantis, which is one of three millipedes described from Mexican amber.

== History and classification ==
Anbarrhacus adamantis was described from a solitary fossil, which is preserved as an inclusion in a transparent chunk of Mexican amber. At the time of description, the amber specimen was housed in the fossil collection of the Instituto Nacional de Antropología e Historia in San Cristóbal de las Casas, Simojovel. The holotype fossil is composed of a very complete immature male recovered from the Guadalupe Victoria site. Mexican amber is recovered from fossil bearing rocks in the Simojovel region of Chiapas, Mexico. The amber dates from between 23 million years old at the oldest and 15 million years at the youngest. The Guadalupe Victoria site is an outcrop of amber bearing strata belonging to both the Mazantic Shale and Balumtum Sandstone. The deposits preserve a transitional river or stream environments near the coast and preserves fossils of a mangrove forest ecosystem.

The holotype was first studied by a team of researchers headed by Francisco Riquelme of the Universidad Autónoma del Estado de Morelos with their 2014 type description of the genus and species being published in the natural sciences journal PLOS ONE. The genus name is a derived from a combination of the Arabic voice word ánbar for "amber" and rhacus, which is used frequently as a genus suffix in the family Platyrhacidae. The specific epithet adamantis was coined from the Neo-Latin word adamantus meaning diamond, a reference to the patterning on the tops of the collum and metatergites.

A. adamantis is one of three millipede species described from Mexican amber, the others being Maatidesmus paachtun and Parastemmiulus elektron, while a number of other species have been described from the similarly aged Dominican amber.

== Description ==
The A. adamantis male is mostly a creamy white in coloration with a yellowish tone to the labrum and areas of the legs. The sterna grade between yellowish and brown. The total body length is approximately 19.8 mm (0.78 in) and has a total of 17 body segments plus head. The head is a little wider than the next body segment, called the collum. The antennae have a total of seven antennomeres that vary in length and form a club-shaped tip. The longest segment is antennomere 5 followed by antennomere 6, and the shortest are antennomeres 1 and 7. Both antennomeres 5 and 6 have long setae near their apical ends, and the antennae have four sensory cones preserved. The upper plates of the body segments after the collum are heavily lobed forming metatergites and paranota. The surface of the paranota, side lobes of the metatergites, have a granular texturing, and the metatergites have a distinct diamond shaped patterning in the texturing. The segments gradually get wider from the head to about two thirds of the way down the body after which the segments start to narrow progressively to segment 17. The male is mature enough to show developing bulb shaped gonopods on segment 7.
