= Cephalotes olmecus =

Scientific classification
- Kingdom: Animalia
- Phylum: Arthropoda
- Clade: Pancrustacea
- Class: Insecta
- Order: Hymenoptera
- Family: Formicidae
- Subfamily: Myrmicinae
- Genus: Cephalotes
- Species: †C. olmecus

Binomial name
- †Cephalotes olmecus de Andrade, 1999

Extinct species of ant

Cephalotes olmecus is an extinct species of arboreal ant of the genus Cephalotes known only from Mexican amber inclusions.

== Taxonomy ==
Cephalotes olmecus was first described in 1999 from two Chiapas amber fossil inclusions of respectively a worker and a dwarf soldier ant. Maria de Andrade, who described the species, placed C. olmecus in the grandinosus clade in which it forms a subclade with fossil species Cephalotes maya and extant species Cephalotes foliaceus.

The specific epithet olmecus is in reference to the Olmecs of Mexico.
