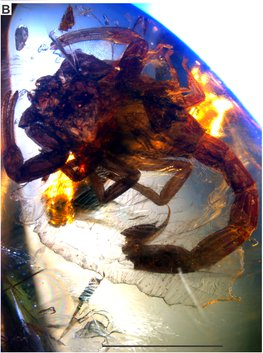
- T. apozonalli holotype

Scientific classification
- Kingdom: Animalia
- Phylum: Arthropoda
- Subphylum: Chelicerata
- Class: Arachnida
- Order: Scorpiones
- Family: Buthidae
- Genus: Tityus
- Species: T. apozonalli

Binomial name
- Tityus apozonalli Riquelme, Villegas, & González, 2015

= Tityus apozonalli =

Tityus apozonalli Temporal range: Early – Middle Miocene

Extinct species of scorpion

Tityus apozonalli is an extinct species of scorpion in the family Buthidae known from a fossil found in North America. The species is one of two scorpions described from Mexican amber and one of seven species from Central American amber deposits.

== History and classification ==
Tityus apozonalli was described from a solitary fossil, which is preserved as an inclusion in a transparent chunk of Mexican amber. At the time of description, the amber specimen was housed in the fossil collection of the Museo del Ámbar de Chiapas in San Cristóbal de las Casas, Simojovel. The holotype fossil is composed of a very complete adult male recovered from the Guadalupe Victoria site. Mexican amber is recovered from fossil bearing rocks in the Simojovel region of Chiapas, Mexico. The amber dates from between 23 million years old at the oldest and 15 million years at the youngest. The Guadalupe Victoria site is an outcrop of amber bearing strata belonging to the Mazantic Shale and Balumtum Sandstone. The deposits preserve a transitional river or stream environments near the coast and preserves fossils of a mangrove forest ecosystem.

The holotype was first studied by a team of researchers headed by Francisco Riquelme of the Universidad Autónoma del Estado de Morelos with their 2015 type description of the species being published in the natural sciences journal PLoS ONE. The specific epithet apozonalli was derived from the Náhuatl word "apozonalli", coined by the Aztecs for amber, and translating as sea bubble or foam.

T. apozonalli is one of two Tityus species described from Mexican amber, the other being Tityus knodeli. Three other species have been described from the similarly aged Dominican amber Tityus azari, Tityus geratus and Tityus hartkorni.

== Description ==
The T. apozonalli is a reddish-brown in overall coloration with the manus pedipalps, and legs a pale yellowish tone. The total body length is 17.8 mm (0.70 in) and a 9.3 mm (0.37 in) metasoma. There are several eyes on the ocular node, with two smaller ocelli placed to the sides of the median node. On the 1.1 mm (0.043 in) chelicerae there are rows of dentition which line up on each side of the jaws and scattered macrosetae on the lower back edges. The enlarged pedipalps have raised ridges along the femur, patella, and the chelae. There are trichobothria present but the exact configuration is hard to determine due to the preservation. Both the fixed and mobile sides of the chela have rows of teeth with a slightly darkened coloration. The underside of the mesosoma clearly shows the paired pecten combs each with twenty-nine teeth. At the rear of the mesosoma the male genitalia are only faintly visible in the subtriangular genital operculum. The telson has both a large Aculeus and a smaller subaculear tubercle.
