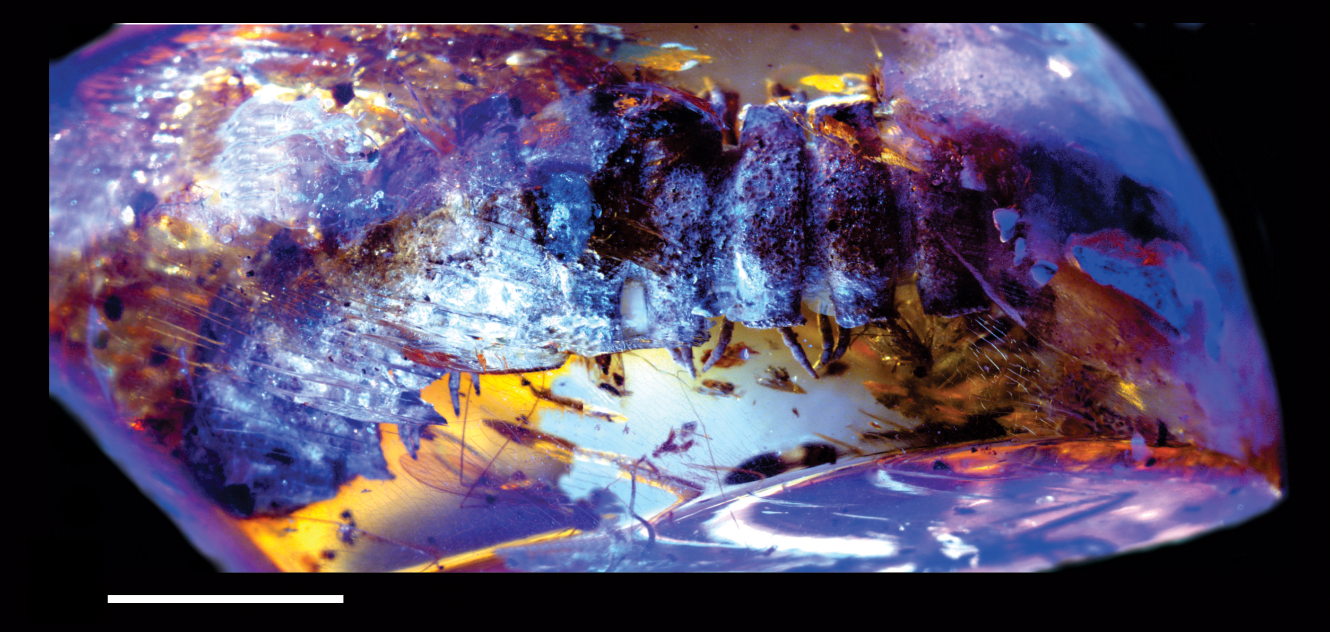
- M. paachtun holotype

Scientific classification
- Kingdom: Animalia
- Phylum: Arthropoda
- Subphylum: Myriapoda
- Class: Diplopoda
- Order: Polydesmida
- Family: Chelodesmidae
- Genus: †Maatidesmus
- Species: †M. paachtun

Binomial name
- †Maatidesmus paachtun Riquelme & Hernández, 2014

= Maatidesmus =

Maatidesmus Temporal range: Early - Middle Miocene

Extinct genus of millipedes

Maatidesmus is an extinct genus of millipede in the family Chelodesmidae known from a fossil found in North America. There is one described species in the genus, Maatidesmus paachtun, one of three millipedes described from Mexican amber.

== History and classification ==
Maatidesmus paachtun was described from a solitary fossil, which is preserved as an inclusion in a transparent chunk of Mexican amber. At the time of description, the amber specimen was housed in the fossil collection of the Instituto Nacional de Antropología e Historia in San Cristóbal de las Casas, Simojovel. The holotype fossil is composed of a very complete adult female recovered from the La Guadalupe Quarry. Mexican amber is recovered from fossil bearing rocks in the Simojovel region of Chiapas, Mexico. The amber dates from between 23 million years old at the oldest and 15 million years at the youngest. The La Guadalupe Quarry site is an outcrop of amber-bearing strata belonging to the Mazantic shale. The deposits preserve a transitional river or stream environments near the coast and preserves fossils of a mangrove forest ecosystem.

The holotype was first studied by a team of researchers headed by Francisco Riquelme of the Universidad Autónoma del Estado de Morelos with their 2014 type description of the genus and species being published in the natural sciences journal PLOS ONE. The genus name is a derived from a combination of the Mayan word maat for "amber" and "idesmus", which is used frequently as a genus suffix in the family Chelodesmidae. The specific epithet paachtun was coined from a combination of the Mayan words paach meaning "back" and tun meaning "stone", a reference to the distinct sculpturing and lobing on the collum and lobe-bearing tergites.

M. paachtun is one of three millipede species described from Mexican amber, the others being Anbarrhacus adamantis and Parastemmiulus elektron, while a number of other species have been described from the similarly aged Dominican amber.

== Description ==
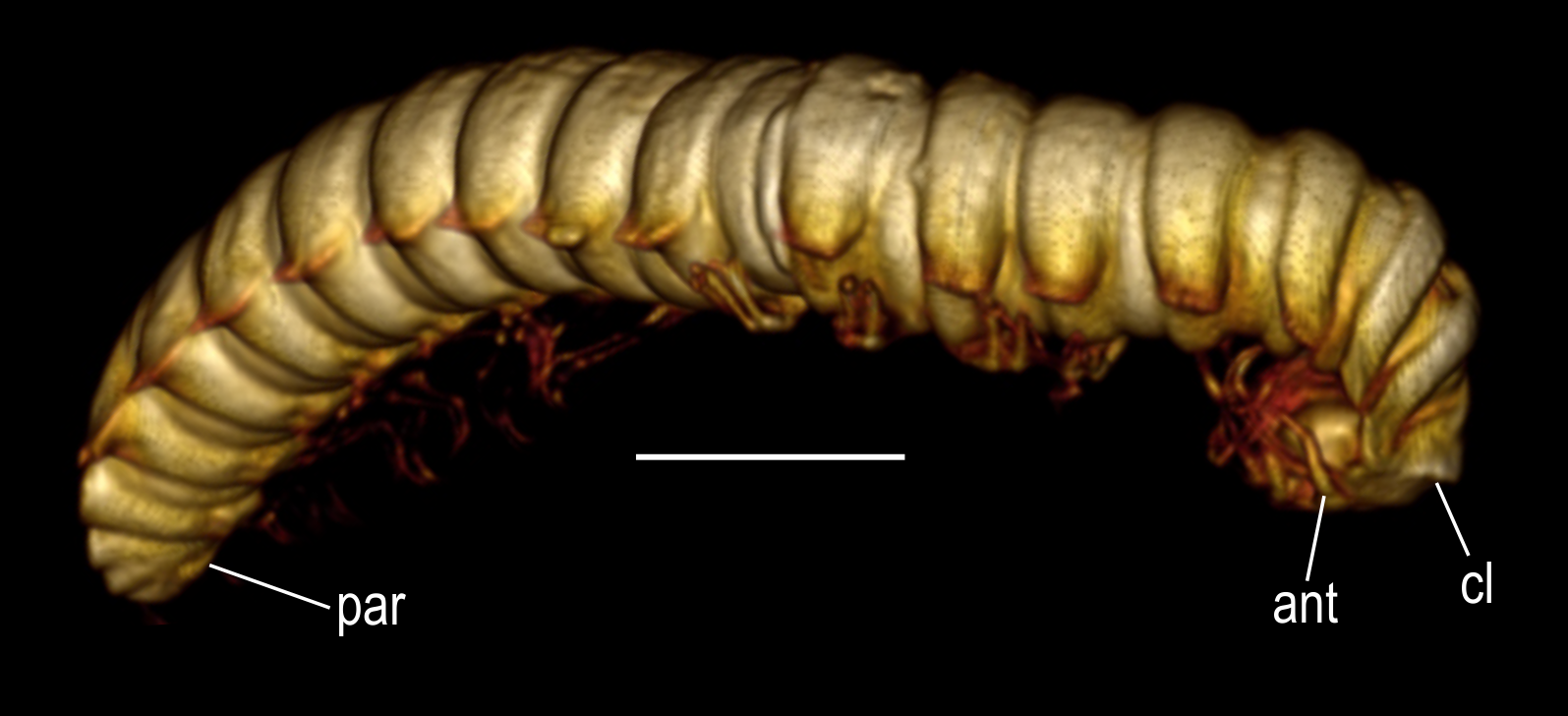
CT reconstruction

The M. paachtun female is mostly a creamy white in coloration with "splattering"s of nut-brown, though the specimen shows areas of recrystallization where the cuticle and amber reacted forming possible calcium carbonates. The total body length is 35.5 mm (1.40 in) and has a total of 19 body segments plus head. The head is a little wider than the next body segment, called the collum. The antennae have a total of seven antennomeres that vary in length. The longest segments are antennomeres 2 and 6, while the shortest are antennomeres 1 and 7. The tops of the collum and body segments 2 to 5 are heavily lobed with three rows of lobes on each segment. The large lobes change to more scattered small lobes on segments 6 and 7. The segments gradually get wider from the head to segment 16 after which the segments start to narrow progressively to segment 19.
