= Leptopharsa tacanae =

Leptopharsa tacanae Temporal range: Late Oligocene – Middle Miocene

Scientific classification
- Kingdom: Animalia
- Phylum: Arthropoda
- Clade: Pancrustacea
- Class: Insecta
- Order: Hemiptera
- Suborder: Heteroptera
- Family: Tingidae
- Genus: Leptopharsa
- Species: †L. tacanae

Binomial name
- †Leptopharsa tacanae Coty, Garrouste, & Nel, 2014

Extinct species of true bug

Leptopharsa tacanae is an extinct species of lace bug in the family Tingidae. The species is solely known from the Late Oligocene to Middle Miocene Mexican amber deposits. The species is the first lace bug described from Mexican amber.

== History and classification ==
Leptopharsa tacanae is known from the holotype specimen, collection number TOT158.1, which is an inclusion in a transparent chunk of Mexican amber, also known as Chiapas amber. As of 2014, the type insect was part of the David Coty fossil collection provisionally housed at the Muséum National d’Histoire Naturelle, Paris, France. This amber predates a range from between 22.5 million years old, for the youngest sediments of the Balumtun Sandstone, and 26 million years, for the La Quinta Formation. This age range, which straddles the boundary between the Late Oligocene and Early Miocene, is complicated by both formations being secondary deposits for the amber; consequently, the given age range is only the youngest that the fossil might be. The L. tacanae fossil was recovered from amber deposits along the Yalbantuc River, near Totolapa in the Chiapas depression, distant from the major Mexican amber deposits in the Simojovel region. The geology of the Totolapa region is currently identified as Eocene in age, but the fauna of the amber is very similar to both the Simojovel fauna and to Dominican amber, indicating that a reassessment of the geology may be needed.

The holotype was first studied by paleoentomologists David Coty, Romain Garrouste and André Nel, of the Muséum National. Their type description of the species was published in the Annales de la Société Entomologique de France in 2014. The specific epithet tacanae derived from the Tacana volcano, which is on the border of Mexico and Guatemala, and the second highest volcano in Central America.

Leptopharsa tacana is the first lace bug to be described from Mexican amber fossils, while the related Dominican amber fauna is much more diverse with six described species as of 2014: Eocader balyrussus, Leptopharsa evsyunini, Leptopharsa frater, Leptopharsa poinari, Stephanitis rozanovi and Phymacysta stysi.

== Description ==
The L. tacanae type specimen is a male that has an approximately 2.14 mm (0.084 in) long body, and is 3.20 mm (0.126 in) long with the wings included. The original coloration of the individual is not clear due to the amber, however the color patterning of light and dark is well preserved. The venation on the hemelytra has the typical thickening, and four of the cross veins in the costal area show a distinct darkened color tone. The flattened extensions along both the hemelytra and the abdomen are edged with small spines, each of which bear short, upright setae. The extensions are divided into two rows of subrectangular cells by a center vein. The antennae, nearly as long as the body is, are composed of four elongated segments and the last two segments are both covered with a dense, semi-erect covering of setae. The last antenna segment is also visibly darker in coloration. The head has five total spines, three spines located towards the front of the head, and two at the eyes. Two of the front spines are paired arising from the antennae bases, while the third front spine arises in between the two. The two occipital spines are curved and lay against the head capsule.
