= Parastemmiulus =

Parastemmiulus Temporal range: Early - Middle Miocene

Scientific classification
- Kingdom: Animalia
- Phylum: Arthropoda
- Subphylum: Myriapoda
- Class: Diplopoda
- Order: Stemmiulida
- Family: Stemmiulidae
- Genus: †Parastemmiulus; Riquelme et al, 2013
- Species: †P. elektron

Binomial name
- †Parastemmiulus elektron Riquelme et al, 2013

Extinct genus of millipedes

Parastemmiulus is an extinct genus of millipede in the family Stemmiulidae known from a fossil found in Mexico. There is one described species in the genus, Parastemmiulus elektron. The species is one of three millipedes described from Mexican amber, and the oldest Stemmiulidae fossil species as of 2013.

== History and classification ==
Parastemmiulus elektron was described from a solitary fossil, which is preserved as an inclusion in a transparent chunk of Mexican amber. At the time of description, the amber specimen was housed in the fossil collection of the Instituto Nacional de Antropología e Historia in San Cristóbal de las Casas, Simojovel. The holotype fossil is composed of a very complete adult female recovered from the La Guadalupe Quarry. Mexican amber is recovered from fossil bearing rocks in the Simojovel region of Chiapas, Mexico. The amber dates from between 23 million years old at the oldest and 15 million years at the youngest. The La Guadalupe Quarry site is an outcrop of amber bearing strata belonging to the Mazantic shale. The deposits preserve a transitional river or stream environments near the coast and preserves fossils of a mangrove forest ecosystem.

The holotype was first studied by a team of researchers headed by Francisco Riquelme of the Universidad Autónoma del Estado de Morelos with their 2013 type description of the genus and species being published in the natural sciences journal Historical Biology. The genus name is a combination of the genus Stemmiulus and "para" meaning along side, a reference to the similarities between the two genera. The specific epithet elektron is based from the Greek word meaning amber.

Parastemmiulus elektron is one of three millipede species described from Mexican amber, the others being Anbarrhacus adamantis and Maatidesmus paachtun, while a number of other species have been described from the similarly aged Dominican amber. One possible Stemmulid fossil was described from Dominican amber, however it was not complete, and has been regarded as doubtful. P. elektron is the first Stemmulid genus described from a fossil.

== Description ==
The P. elektron female is reddish-brown in overall coloration with the legs a brownish tone that trends to hyaline. The body is composed of forty six segments and has a length of approximately 21 mm (0.83 in). The ocellar field is shallow and triangular in shape with three ocelli, and is positioned just to the rear of the antennae. Two grooved possible sensory canals are present in the field, one connecting the rear and front ocelli, the other connecting the middle ocelli to the antenna socket. Present is a defined, pear-shaped Tömösváry organ located below the antenna socket and reaching the ocellar field. The antennae have a total of eight antennomeres that vary in length. The largest segment is antennomere 2, while the smallest is antennomere 7. The low ocelli numbers, differences in ocelli sizes, and varied antennomere lengths is a combination of characters only found in Stemmiulida. However, in contrast to P. elektron living species of the family do not have a Tömösváry organ.
