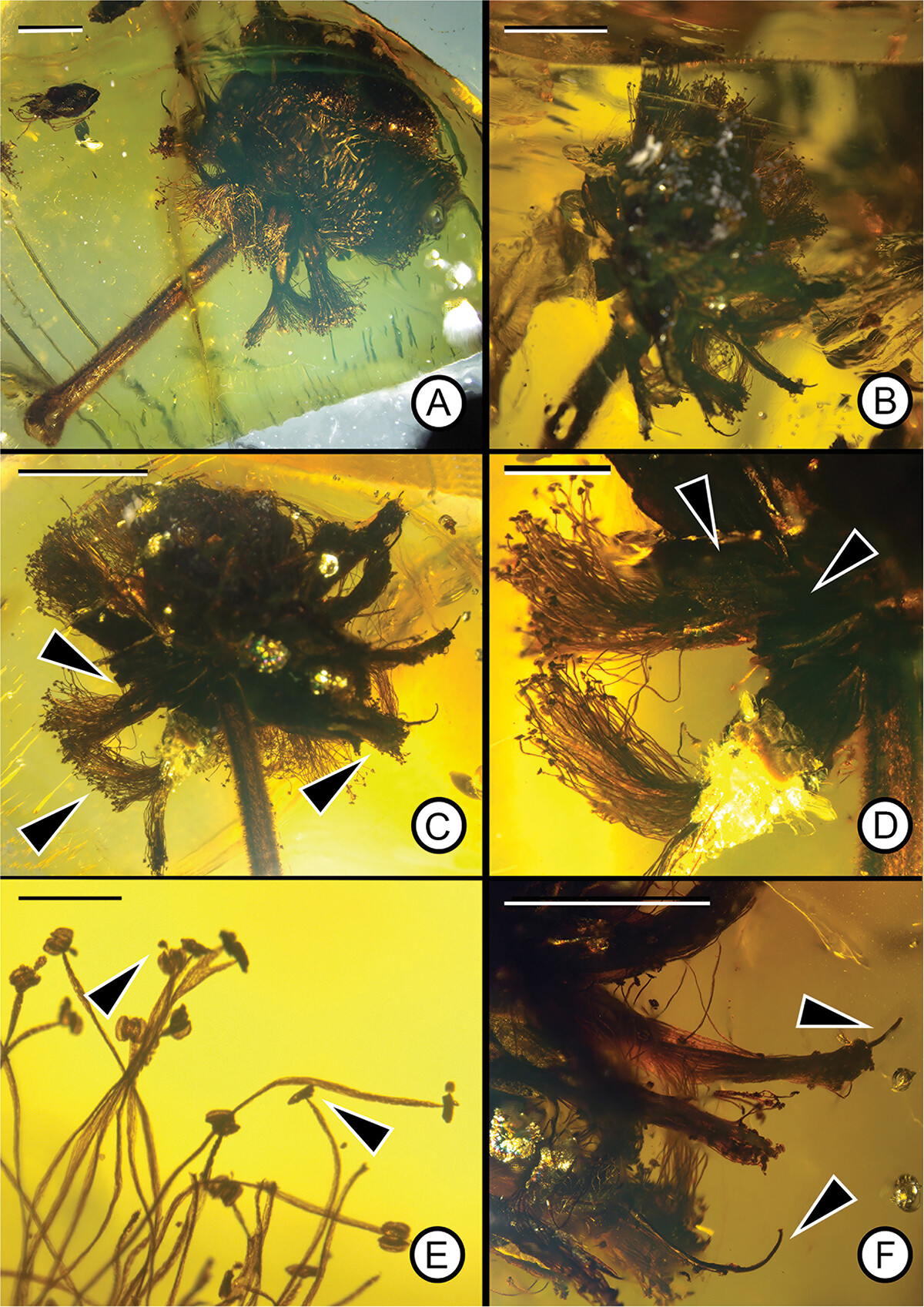
- Various photos of the Simojoflorum mijangosii inflorescence set within the Mexican amber

Scientific classification
- Kingdom: Plantae
- Clade: Embryophytes
- Clade: Tracheophytes
- Clade: Angiosperms
- Clade: Eudicots
- Clade: Rosids
- Order: Fabales
- Family: Fabaceae
- Subfamily: Caesalpinioideae
- Clade: Mimosoid clade
- Tribe: Mimoseae
- Genus: †Simojoflorum; Hernández-Damián et al., 2026
- Species: †S. mijangosii

Binomial name
- †Simojoflorum mijangosii Hernández-Damián et al., 2026

= Simojoflorum =

Simojoflorum Temporal range: Early Miocene

Extinct genus of flowering plants

Simojoflorum is an extinct flowering plant belonging to the family Fabaceae and the tribe Mimoseae, from the early Miocene of Mexico. The discovery of Simojoflorum suggests that the Mimoseae diversified during the Miocene, possibly due to a period of aridification.

== Discovery and naming ==
The holotype material for Simojoflorum was found within Mexican amber, which was collected from the La Quinta Formation, Chiapas, Mexico. It was formally described and named in 2026.

The generic name Simojoflorum derives from the place name of Simojovel, the locality in which the amber was found; and the Latin word florum, meaning "flowers". The specific name mijangosii is in honour of Luis Alonso Zuñiga Mijangos, who has made contributions to studies done on Mexican amber.

== Description ==
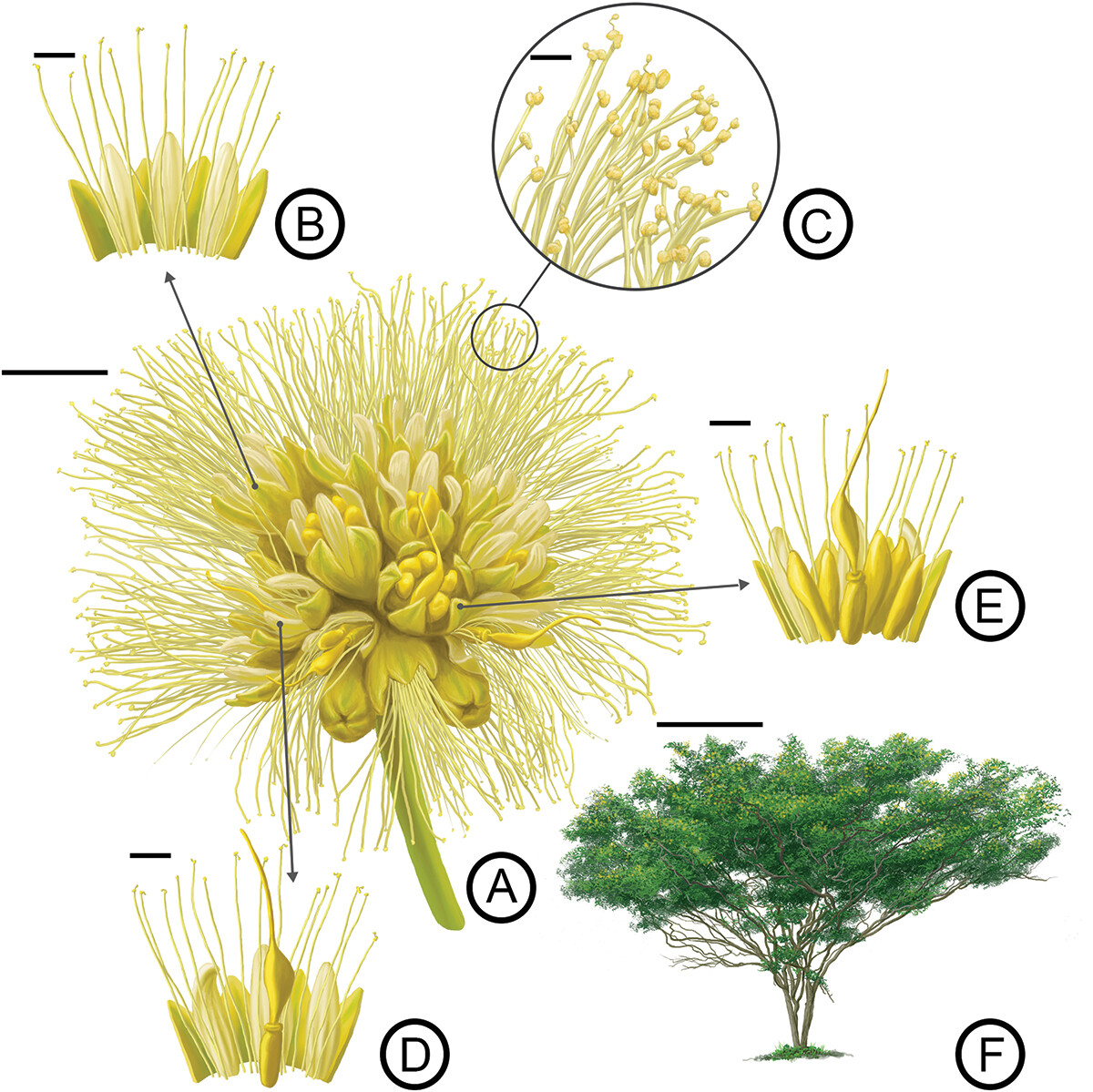
Reconstruction of Simojoflorum mijangosii, as well as a hypothetical reconstruction of the tree it would have been found on

Simojoflorum mijangosii is composed of a spherical capitate inflorescence, which sits on top of a partial stalk, which reaches up to 3.5 mm (0.1 in) in length.

The inflorescence itself is 6 mm (0.2 in) in diameter overall, and consists of eighteen staminate and bisexual flowers, which are in differing stages of growth. The staminate flowers range from 1.3–2.6 mm (0.1–0.1 in) in length, and 0.3–0.5 mm (0.0–0.0 in) in width, and is differentiated into a calyx and corolla. The calyx is composed of five sepals which are obovate in shape, and get up to 2.0 mm (0.1 in) in length and 0.05 mm (0.002 in) at their widest. There is also an androecium, which is composed of 30 stamens, all of which are slightly fused with each other at their bases. As for the corolla, that is composed of five elliptic petals, which can get up to 2.5 mm (0.1 in) in length, and 0.03 mm (0.0 in) in width, which have a nectariferous disk at the base.

There is also a gynoecium, which consists of a central stipitate carpel, and which gets up to 2.9 mm (0.1 in) in length, and 0.03 mm (0.001 in) in width, and is differentiated into an ovary, style, and stigma. The style is fairly long, getting up to 2.7 mm (0.1 in) in length, meanwhile the stigma is pointed, whilst the ovary is a superior ovary, meaning it is set on top of the receptacle and above the attachment points of all the flowers.

== Affinities ==
Due to the completeness of the Simojoflorum fossil, researchers were able to compare it to multiple families, including Myrtaceae, Euphorbiaceae, and Fabaceae, entirely based on just the inflorescence shape alone.

When further compared with members of the Myrtaceae family, there are notable differences between the two. For example, members of the Myrtaceae bear bisexual flowers with sessile anther glands, and an interior ovary, where it is set part way into the receptacle. Meanwhile, Simojoflorum has stalked anther glands, and a superior ovary. As such, it could not be placed into this family. Then, when further compared with members of the Euphorbiaceae family, there are again notable differences. Euphorbiaceae commonly bear three carpels with one to two ovule, whilst Simojoflorum has two bisexual flowers with a central carpel with up to twenty ovules in two rows.

The researchers as such concluded that the fossil best closely resembled members of the Fabaceae family, due to the spherical inflorescence, with both bisexual and unisexual flowers, and a superior ovary. From this, Simojoflorum was assigned to the tribe Mimoseae, with it bearing similarities with other members of the tribe, such as Eomimosoidea and Protomimosoidea.
