= Trichomorpha esulcata =

Scientific classification
- Kingdom: Animalia
- Phylum: Arthropoda
- Subphylum: Myriapoda
- Class: Diplopoda
- Order: Polydesmida
- Family: Chelodesmidae
- Genus: Trichomorpha
- Species: T. esulcata

Binomial name
- Trichomorpha esulcata Loomis, 1975

Species of millipede

Trichomorpha esulcata is a species of millipede in the family Chelodesmidae that can be found in San Vito, Costa Rica, where it was found on 17–18 April 1972.

== Description ==
The males are up to 10.5–13 mm (0.41–0.51 in) long and 1.5–1.6 mm (0.059–0.063 in) wide, while females are slightly shorter. The body is brownish in color but uncolored on the outer antennae joints, legs, posterior of keel, and ventral surfaces.
