= Schwenckfeldina archoica =

Schwenckfeldina archoica Temporal range: Late Oligocene – early Miocene

Scientific classification
- Kingdom: Animalia
- Phylum: Arthropoda
- Class: Insecta
- Order: Diptera
- Family: Sciaridae
- Genus: Schwenckfeldina
- Species: †S. archoica

Binomial name
- †Schwenckfeldina archoica Mohrig & Solórzano Kraemer, 2007

Species of fly

Schwenckfeldina archoica is an extinct species of dark winged fungus gnat in the family Sciaridae known from a solitary Late Oligocene to Early Miocene fossil found in Mexico. S. archoica is the only species in the genus Schwenckfeldina to have been described from fossils found in Mexican amber.

== History and classification ==
Schwenckfeldina archoica is known from a single fossil, an inclusion in a transparent chunk of Mexican amber. The amber specimen, number SMNS Mx 367, is currently housed in the fossil collection of the State Museum of Natural History Stuttgart in Baden-Württemberg, Germany. The holotype fossil is composed of a fully complete adult male. Mexican amber is recovered from fossil-bearing rocks in the Simojovel region of Chiapas, Mexico. The amber dates from between 22.5 million years old, for the youngest sediments of the Balumtun Sandstone, and 26 million years old La Quinta Formation. This age range straddles the boundary between the Late Oligocene and Early Miocene and is complicated by both formations being secondary deposits for the amber; the age range is therefore only the youngest that it might be. The holotype was first studied by entomologists Mónica M. Solórzano Kraemer of the Institut für Paläontologie, part of the University of Bonn, and Werner Mohrig of Poseritz, Germany. To better see the fossil, the amber was cut into a 3 millimetres (0.12 in) thick piece and polished with leather for clarity. Solórzano Kraemer and Mohrig's 2012 type description of the species was published in the Palaeoentomology journal Alavesia. The specific epithet archoica was coined after the Greek word "archaic" as a reference to the great number of features shared between modern species and the fossil.

== Description ==
The Schwenckfeldina archoica male is small, approximately 3.5 millimetres (0.14 in) long, and has a body coloration that is mostly brown. There are a total of sixteen brown flagellomeres in each antenna, with all the flagellomeres wider than they are long, and all covered with a dense grouping of setae. The fore wings are pale and the halteres are short and brown. The species is distinguishable by the structure of the male genitalia, the gonocoxites and gonostyli. The inner sides of the gonocoxites are covered in numerous long bristles, while the gonostyli have an overall broad rounded shape and are brown in color. The outer sides of the gonostyli have long bristles that progress to coat the upper third of the inner side. Three large spines are present in the middle of the inner surface, with the uppermost spine shorter the other two.
