= Hyptia deansi =

Hyptia deansi Temporal range: Late Oligocene – early Miocene

Scientific classification
- Kingdom: Animalia
- Phylum: Arthropoda
- Clade: Pancrustacea
- Class: Insecta
- Order: Hymenoptera
- Family: Evaniidae
- Genus: Hyptia
- Species: †H. deansi

Binomial name
- †Hyptia deansi Jennings, Krogmann and Mew, 2012

Extinct species of wasp

Hyptia deansi is an extinct species of ensign wasp in the family Evaniidae known from a solitary Late Oligocene to Early Miocene fossil found in Mexico. H. deansi is the only species in the genus Hyptia to have been described from fossils and the only ensign wasp described from Mexican amber.

== History and classification ==
Hyptia deansi is known from a single fossil, the holotype adult, which is an inclusion in a transparent chunk of Mexican amber. The amber specimen, number SMNS MX–440, is currently housed in the fossil collection of the State Museum of Natural History Stuttgart in Baden-Württemberg, Germany. The holotype is composed of a fully complete adult female. Mexican amber was recovered from fossil-bearing rocks in the Simojovel region of Chiapas, Mexico. This amber predates a range from between 22.5 million years old, for the youngest sediments of the Balumtun Sandstone, and 26 million years, for the La Quinta Formation, in which specimens are found. This age range, which straddles the boundary between the Late Oligocene and Early Miocene, is complicated by both formations being secondary deposits for the amber; consequently, the given age range is only the youngest that the fossil might be.

The holotype was first studied by paleoentomologists John T. Jennings and Steven Mew, both of the university of Adelaide in conjunction with Lars Krogmann of the State Museum of Natural History Stuttgart. Jennings and his coauthor's 2012 type description of the species was published in the online journal Zootaxa. The specific epithet deansi is in honor of Andy Deans of North Carolina State University in recognition for his efforts to generate new interest in the family Evaniidae.

== Description ==
The Hyptia deansi female is small, being approximately 5.5 millimetres (0.22 in) long and has a body coloration that is mostly brown. Several areas show a black coloration, the gaster and first quarter of the petiole. The antenna segments, flagellomeres, are mostly brown with segments one through ten having a black upper edge that gives a banded look to the antennae. There are a total of eleven flagellomeres in each antenna, with all the flagellomeres being a little wider than they are long, except for the tip flagellomere, which is slightly longer than it is wide. The fore wings have a reduced vein structure with only the costal, subcostal and radial veins developed. The vein structure of the hind wings is obscured due to their positioning during entombment in the resin, and only a costal vein is identifiable. A straight and short ovipositor is visible on the end of the gaster. As with other fossil members of Evaniidae, the petiole is long in comparison to the gaster length, a feature uncommon in modern evaniids. Most other fossil evaniids have long and often curved ovipositors and fairly to fully complete wing venation, in contrast to H. deansi, which has simplified venation and a short ovipositor.
