= Mexican amber =

Miocene amber from Mexico

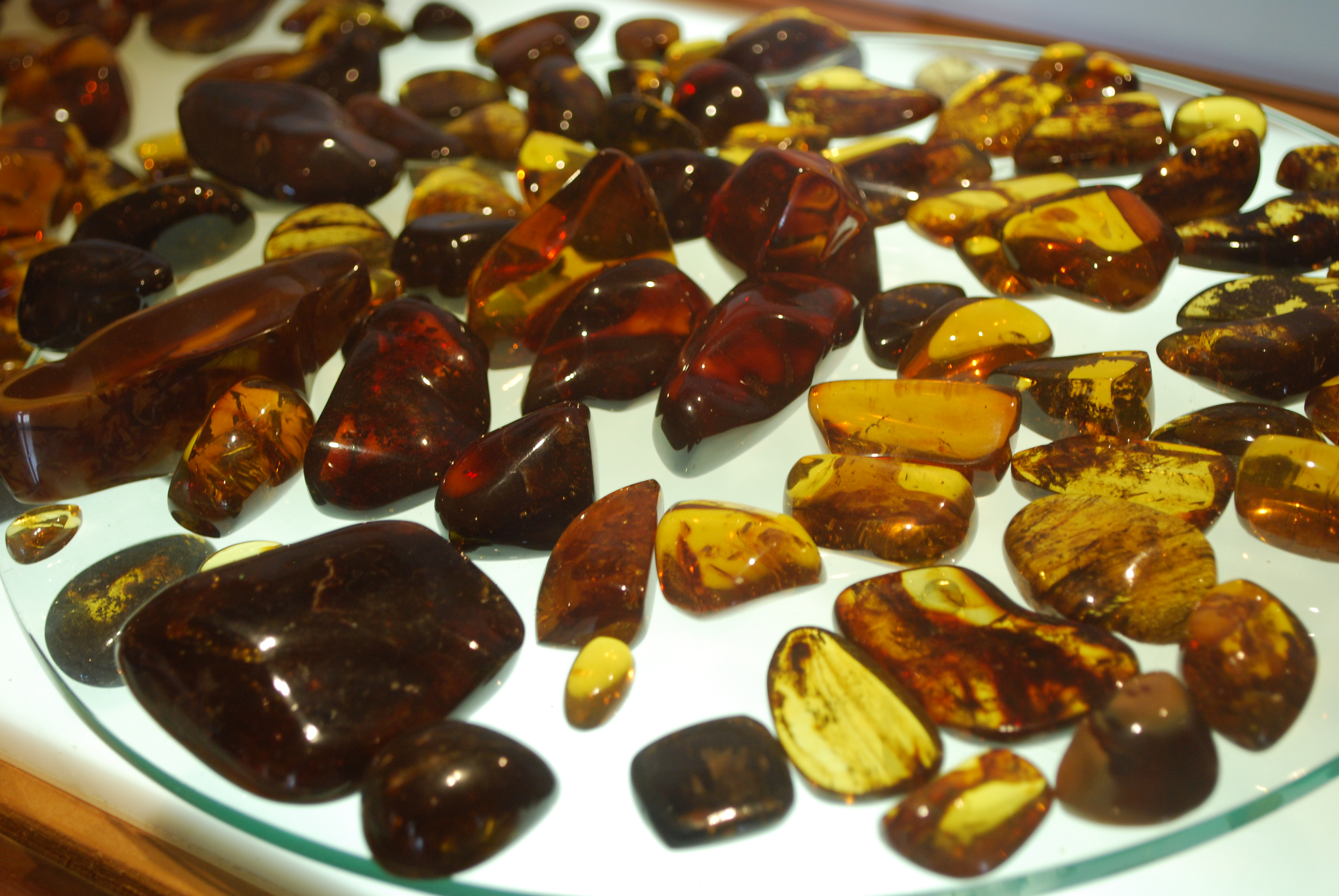
Polished Amber stones from Simijovel at the Museum of Amber (Museo del Ámbar) in San Cristóbal de las Casas, Chiapas, Mexico

Mexican amber, also known as Chiapas amber, is amber found in Mexico, created during the Early Miocene and middle Miocene epochs of the Cenozoic Era in southwestern North America. As with other ambers, a wide variety of taxa have been found as inclusions including insects and other arthropods, as well as plant fragments and epiphyllous fungi.

== Context ==
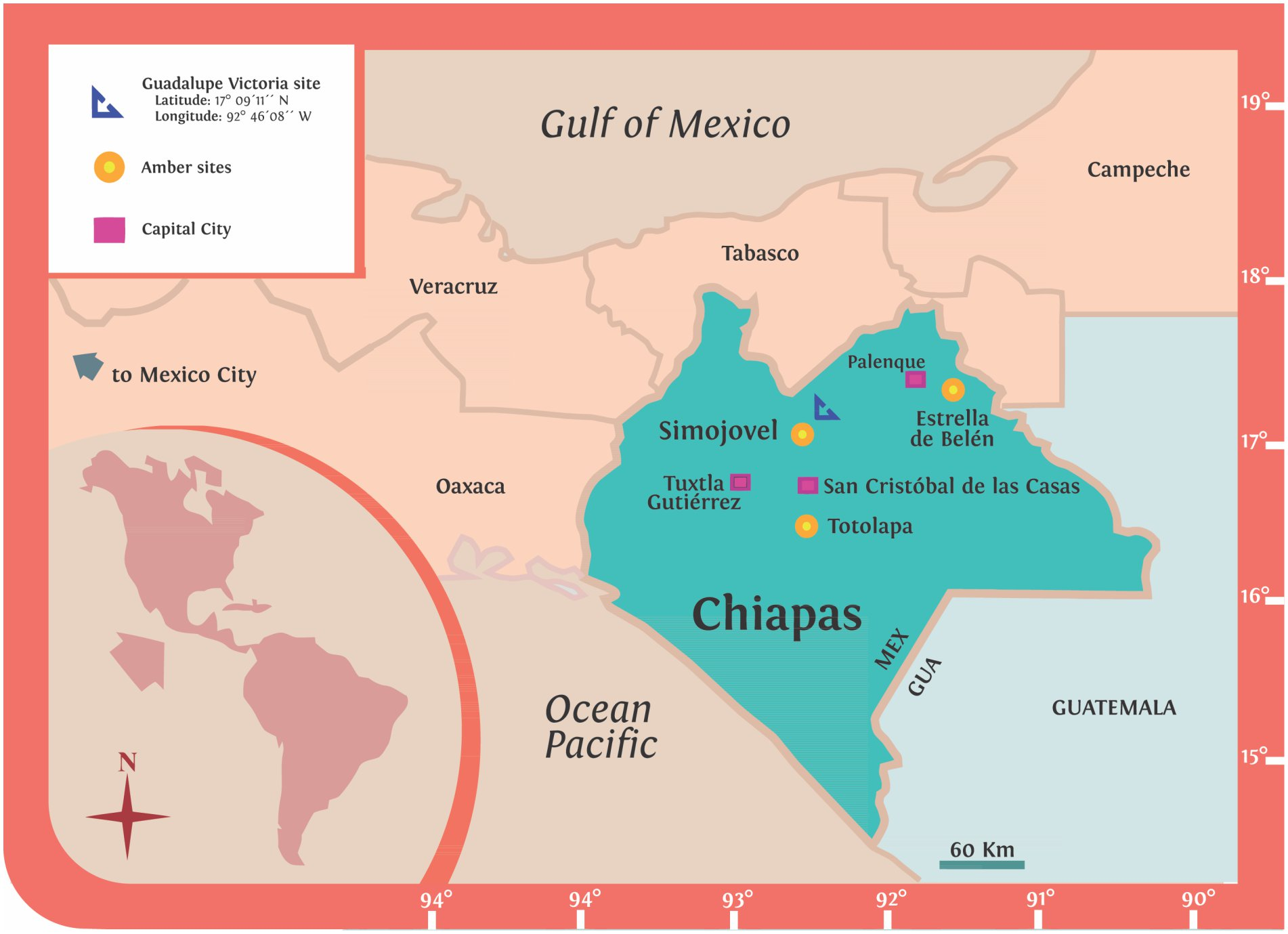
Some amber sites in Mexico

Mexican amber is mainly recovered from fossil bearing rocks in the Simojovel region of Chiapas, Mexico. It is one of the main minerals recovered in the state of Chiapas, much of which is from 23 to 27 million years old, with quality comparable to that found in the Dominican Republic. Chiapan amber has a number of unique qualities, including much that is clear all the way through and some with fossilized insects and plants. Most Chiapan amber is worked into jewelry including pendants, rings and necklaces. Mexican legislation recognises 17 different colorations that range from white over yellow/orange and pink to a deep red but also include green, blue, and black varieties. Since pre-Hispanic times, native peoples have believed amber to have healing and protective qualities.

The largest amber mine is in Simojovel, a small village 130 km from Tuxtla Gutiérrez, which produces 95% of Chiapas' amber. Other mines are found in Huitiupán, Totolapa, El Bosque, Pueblo Nuevo Solistahuacán, Pantelhó and San Andrés Duraznal. According to the Museum of Amber in San Cristóbal, almost 300 kg of amber is extracted per month from the state. Prices vary depending on quality and color.

The amber dates from between 22.5 million years old, for the youngest sediments of the Balumtun Sandstone and 27.3 million years old for the oldest La Quinta Formation.

== Origin ==
The amber was produced by either the two extinct leguminous trees Hymenaea mexicana or Hymenaea allendis, both of which were initially described from fossil flowers included in Mexican amber.

== Regulation ==
Chiapas amber (Spanish: Ámbar de Chiapas) is a protected designation of origin. Norma Oficial Mexicana NOM-152-SCFI-2019 establishes a color-based classification scheme and prescribes certain physio-chemical properties that a substance must fulfil to be considered Chiapas amber (including its infrared spectrum and hardness), alongside procedures of scientific verification. Moreover, amber traders must adhere to certain labelling and certification requirements. Mexico's Mining Code (Spanish: Ley minera), on the other hand, does not cover amber as it is considered a resin, not a mineral.

== Fossil inclusions ==
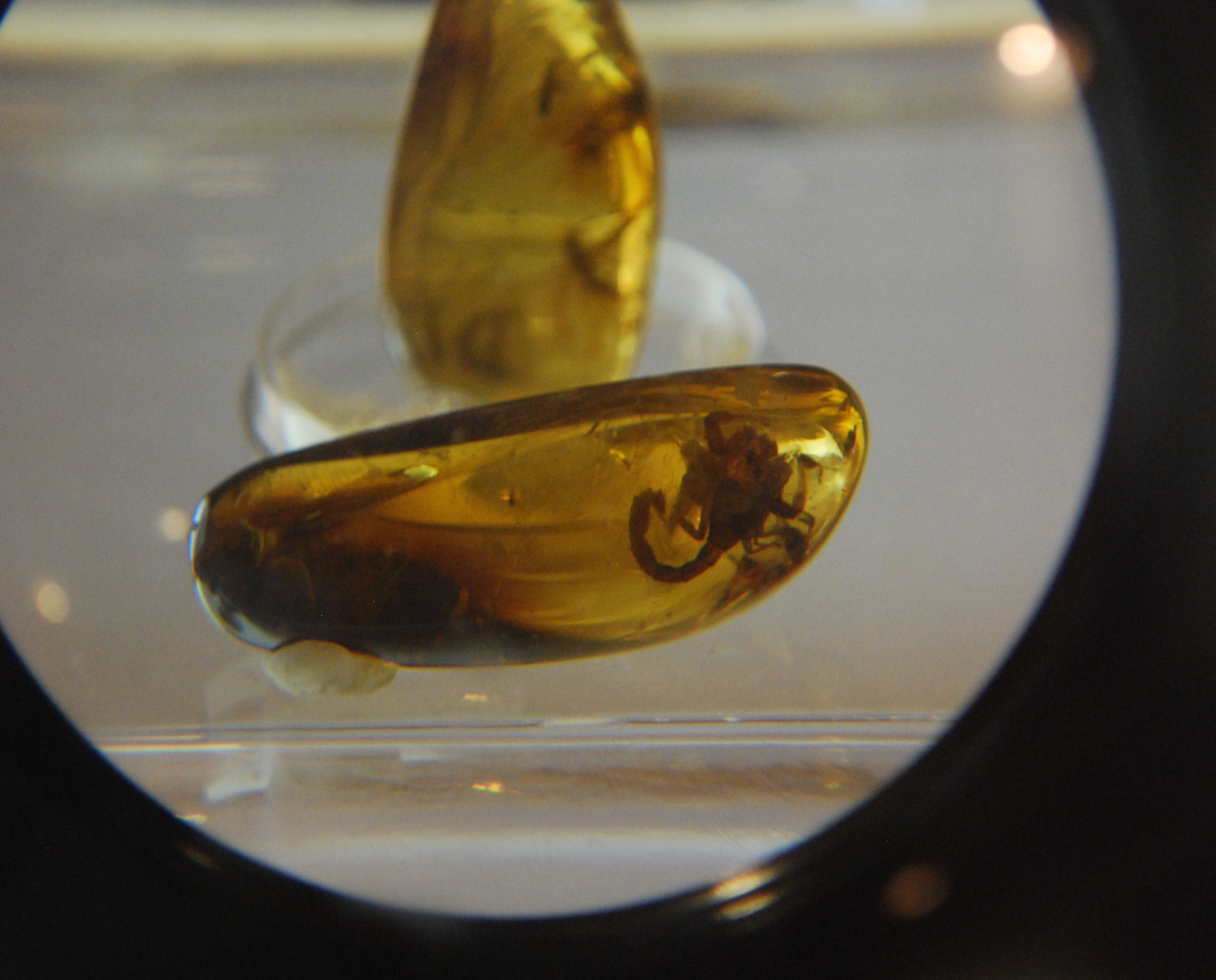
Piece of amber with scorpion as seen through magnifying glass at the Museum of Amber in San Cristobal de las Casas, Chiapas, Mexico

The Tityus apozonalli scorpion holotype fossil is composed of a very complete adult male recovered from the Guadalupe Victoria site. The amber dates from between 23 million years old at the oldest and 15 million years at the youngest. The Guadalupe Victoria site is an outcrop of amber bearing strata belonging to the Mazantic Shale and Balumtum Sandstone. The deposits preserve a transitional river or stream environments near the coast and preserves fossils of a mangrove forest ecosystem. Asteromites mexicanus is an epiphyllous coelomycetes fungus species recovered on a petal. Nine specimens of Miocene crabs are known as inclusions in Chiapas amber.

=== Arthropod species ===
- Agria sp. (a damselfly)
- Amblypsilopus monicae Bickel 2016 (long-legged fly)
- Anbarrhacus adamantis (a millipede)
- Aphaenogaster praerelicta (an ant)
- Cenocephalus tenuis Peris and Solórzano Kraemer 2015 (ambrosia beetle)
- Culoptila aguilerai (a caddisfly)
- Dicromantispa electromexicana (a mantidfly)
- Erpetogomphus sp. (a dragonfly)
- Hyptia deansi (a wasp)
- Leptopharsa tacanae (a lace bug)
- Litaneutria pilosuspedes Terriquez et al. 2022 (mantis)
- Maatidesmus paachtun (a millipede)
- Mastotermes electromexicus (a termite)
- Medetera amissa Bickel 2016 (long-legged fly)
- Medetera totolapa Bickel 2016 (long-legged fly)
- Mesorhaga pseudolacrymans Bickel 2016 (long-legged fly)
- Neoparentia chiapensis Bickel 2016 (long-legged fly)
- Parastemmiulus elektron (a millipede)
- Peloropeodes paleomexicana Bickel 2016 (long-legged fly)
- Schwenckfeldina archoica (a fungus gnat)
- Termitaradus protera (a termite bug)
- Tesserocerus simojovelensis Peris and Solórzano Kraemer 2015 (ambrosia beetle)
- Tityus apozonalli (a scorpion)
- Tityus knodeli (a scorpion)
- Tonocatecutlius sp. (a planthopper)
