= Trichomorpha gracilis =

Scientific classification
- Kingdom: Animalia
- Phylum: Arthropoda
- Subphylum: Myriapoda
- Class: Diplopoda
- Order: Polydesmida
- Family: Chelodesmidae
- Genus: Trichomorpha
- Species: T. gracilis

Binomial name
- Trichomorpha gracilis Carl, 1914

Species of millipede

Trichomorpha gracilis is a species of millipede in the Chelodesmidae family that can be found in San Vito, Costa Rica, where it was initially discovered on either 17 or 18 of April 1972.

== Description ==
The largest male specimen is 20 mm (0.79 in) long and 2 mm (0.079 in) wide, while the largest female specimen is 19 mm (0.75 in) in length and 2.5 mm (0.098 in) wide. The males are flatter than the females, and possess a smooth, shining dorsum. The species are colored chestnut-brown, except for appendages and keels. A strong vertexial sulcus is located on the back of the head, next to the antennae.

=== Segment and setae description ===
Their first segment has a strong rim, which is fine across the front and raised on the sides. The lateral margin is smooth and has setae in front of its posterior angle, surfacing strongly with transverse convex. Fur is present on metazonites segments 5–15 and sometimes 16. Segments 1–5 have a posterior margin which is triarcuate between angles, and therefore is almost straight. Segments 5–16 have a transverse sulcus, which is common among males. The sulcus is rarely present in females.
