= Pandirodesmus =

Scientific classification
- Kingdom: Animalia
- Phylum: Arthropoda
- Subphylum: Myriapoda
- Class: Diplopoda
- Order: Polydesmida
- Family: Chelodesmidae
- Genus: Pandirodesmus; Silvestri, 1932

Species
- Pandirodesmus disparipes Silvestri, 1932; Pandirodesmus jaggernauthi Van den Spiegel, Golovatch & Rutherford, 2022; Pandirodesmus rutherfordi Shelley & Smith, 2015

Genus of millipedes

Pandirodesmus is a genus of flat-backed millipedes in the family Chelodesmidae, occurring in Trinidad and Tobago and Guyana. They are characterized by a lightly sclerotized, smooth, greyish-white exoskeleton and alternating long and short legs, exposed parts usually covered with densely cemented, but loosely attached sand grains imparting a dark beige to black coloration and concealing setae.
