= Hyptia harpyoides =

Scientific classification
- Kingdom: Animalia
- Phylum: Arthropoda
- Class: Insecta
- Order: Hymenoptera
- Family: Evaniidae
- Genus: Hyptia
- Species: H. harpyoides

Binomial name
- Hyptia harpyoides Bradley, 1908

Species of wasp

Hyptia harpyoides is a species of ensign wasp in the family Evaniidae. It is found in North America. It is a parasite of Parcoblatta eggs.
