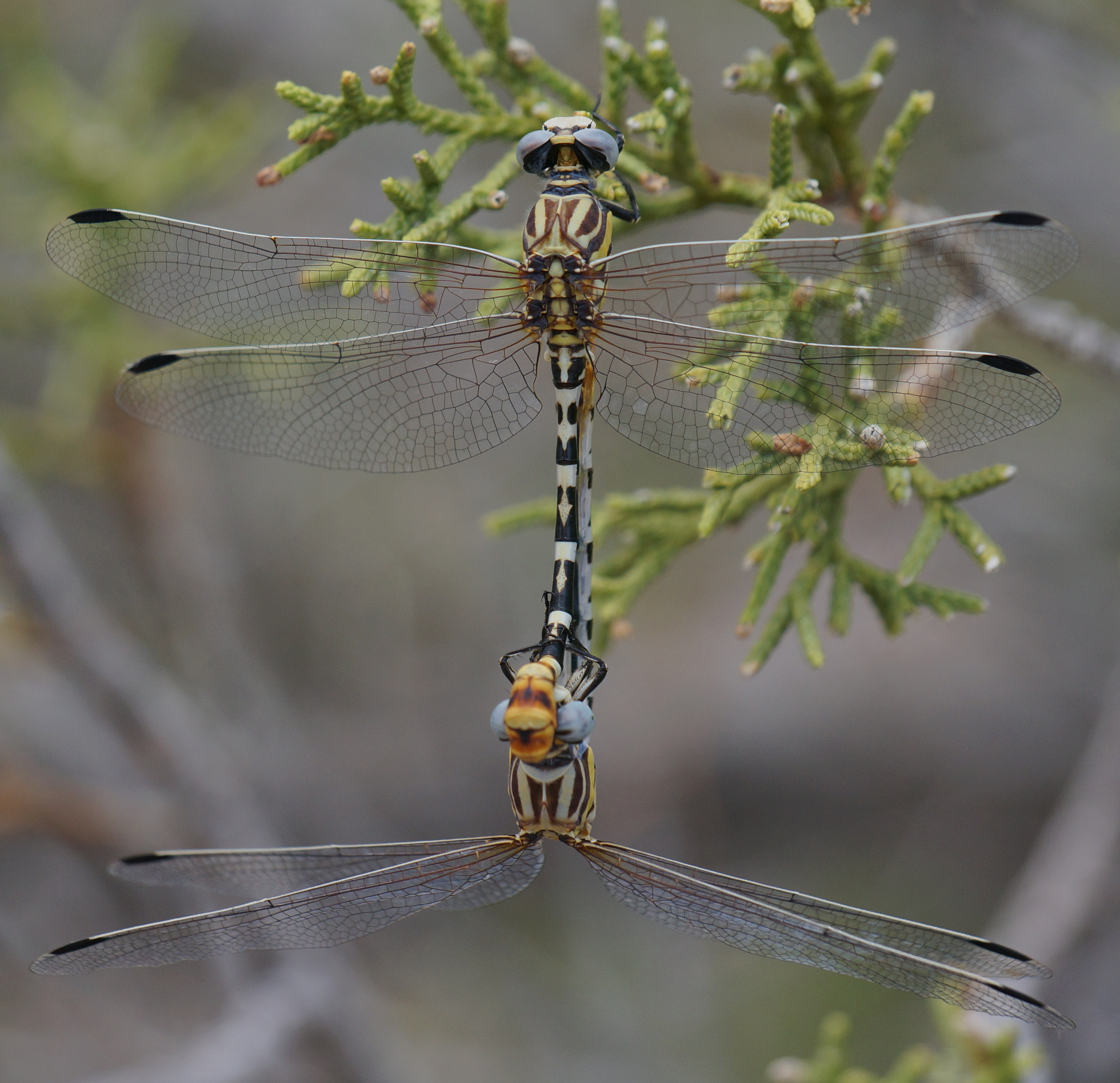

Conservation status
- Least Concern (IUCN 3.1)

Scientific classification
- Domain: Eukaryota
- Kingdom: Animalia
- Phylum: Arthropoda
- Class: Insecta
- Order: Odonata
- Infraorder: Anisoptera
- Family: Gomphidae
- Genus: Erpetogomphus
- Species: E. compositus

Binomial name
- Erpetogomphus compositus Hagen in Selys, 1858

= Erpetogomphus compositus =

Species of dragonfly

Erpetogomphus compositus, the white-belted ringtail, is a species of clubtail in the family of dragonflies known as Gomphidae. It is found in Central America and North America.

The IUCN conservation status of Erpetogomphus compositus is "LC", least concern, with no immediate threat to the species' survival. The population is stable.

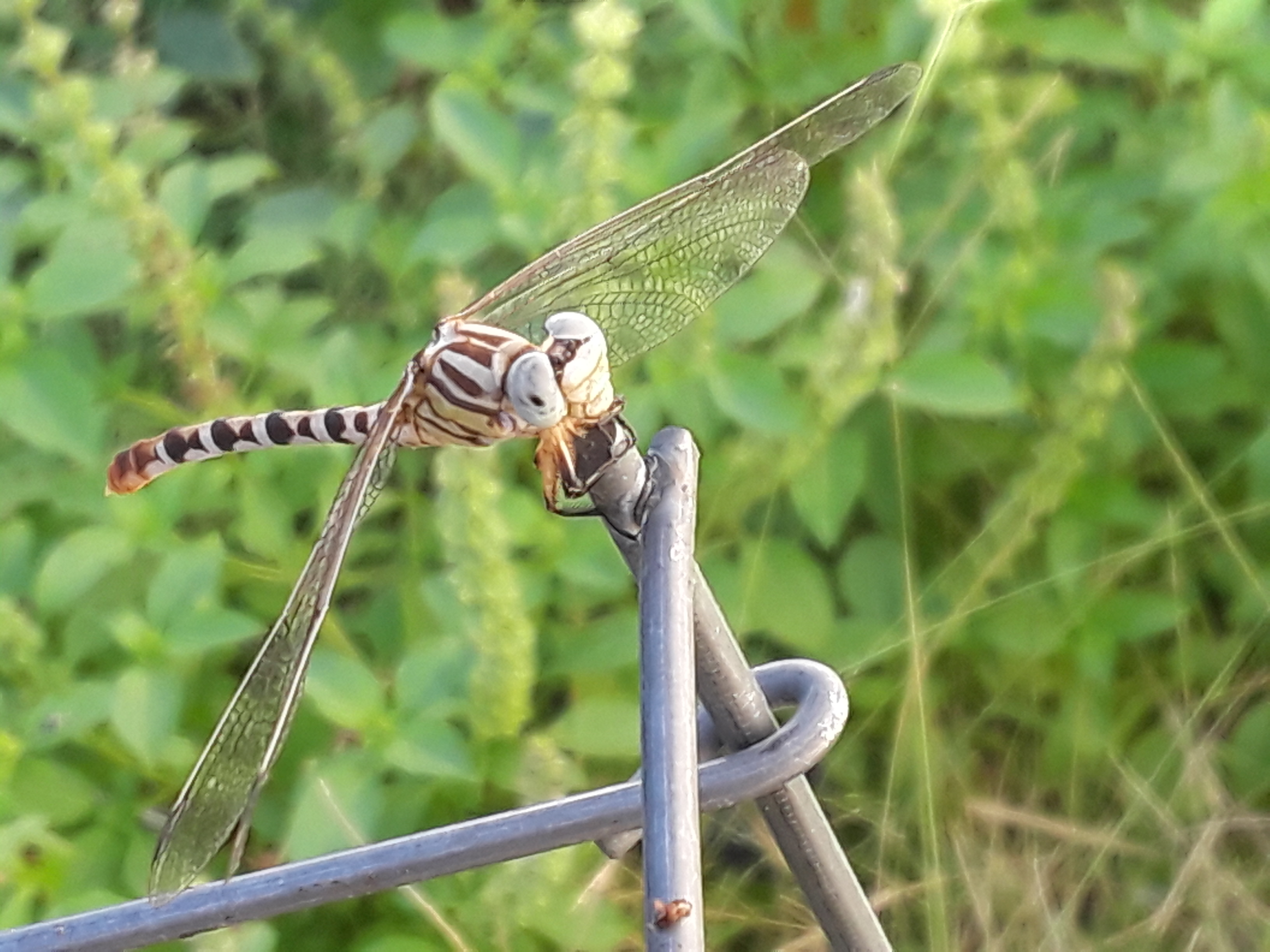
E. compositus

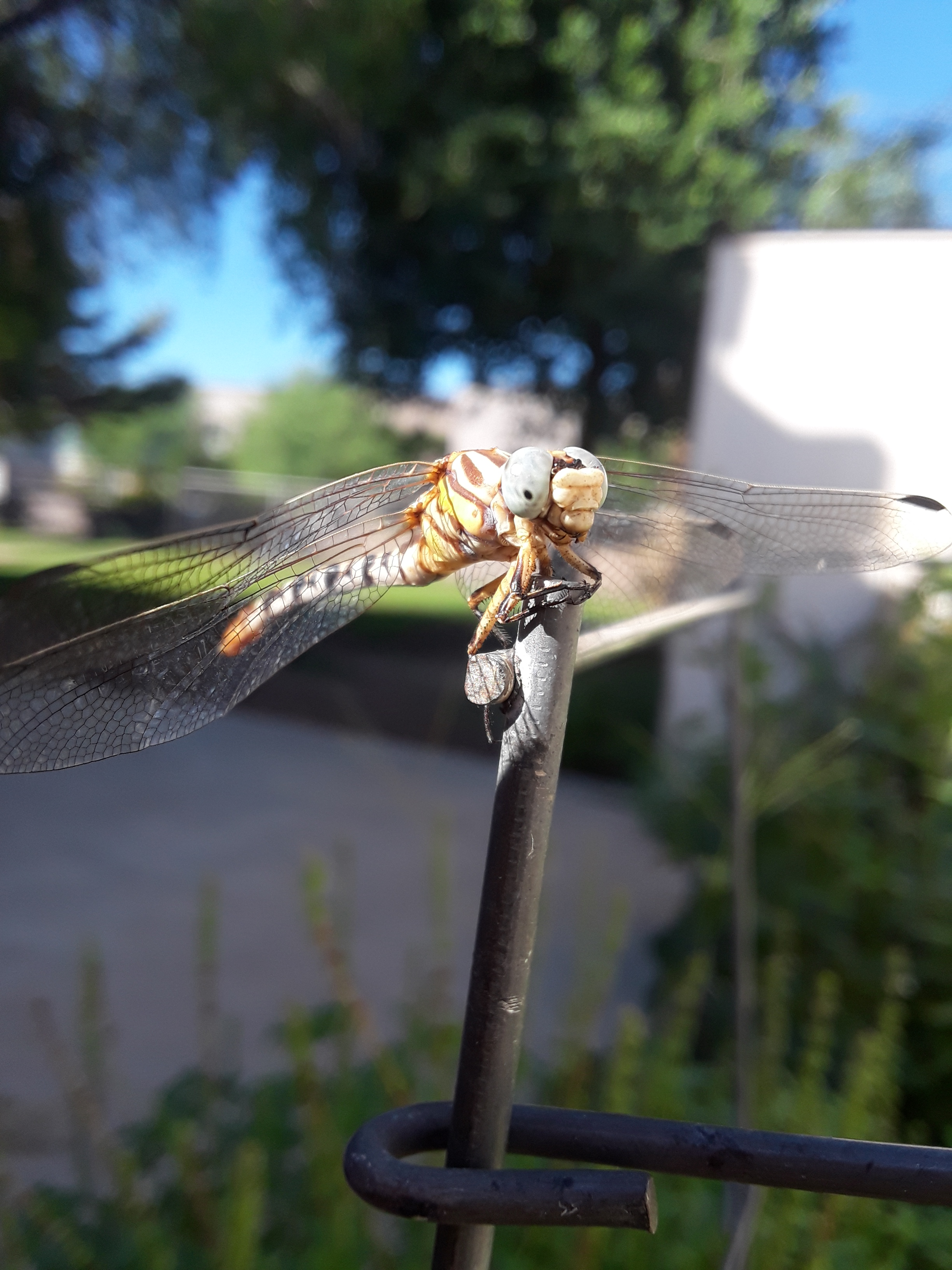
White-belted Ringtail at rest.
