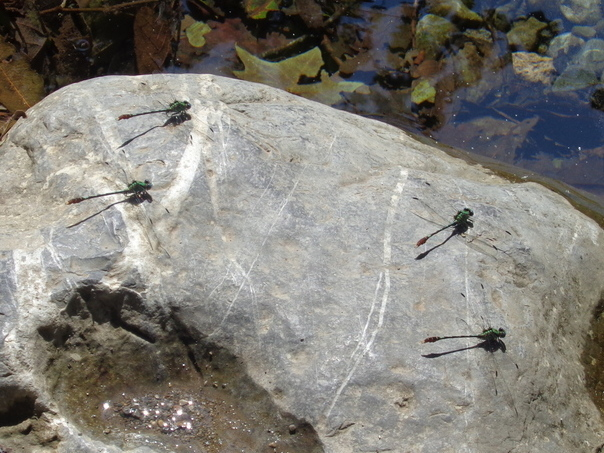

Conservation status
- Least Concern (IUCN 3.1)

Scientific classification
- Domain: Eukaryota
- Kingdom: Animalia
- Phylum: Arthropoda
- Class: Insecta
- Order: Odonata
- Infraorder: Anisoptera
- Family: Gomphidae
- Genus: Erpetogomphus
- Species: E. elaps

Binomial name
- Erpetogomphus elaps (Selys, 1858)

= Erpetogomphus elaps =

Species of dragonfly

Erpetogomphus elaps, the straight-tipped ringtail, is a species of clubtail in the family of dragonflies known as Gomphidae. It is found in Central America.

The IUCN conservation status of Erpetogomphus elaps is "LC", least concern, with no immediate threat to the species' survival. The population is stable.
