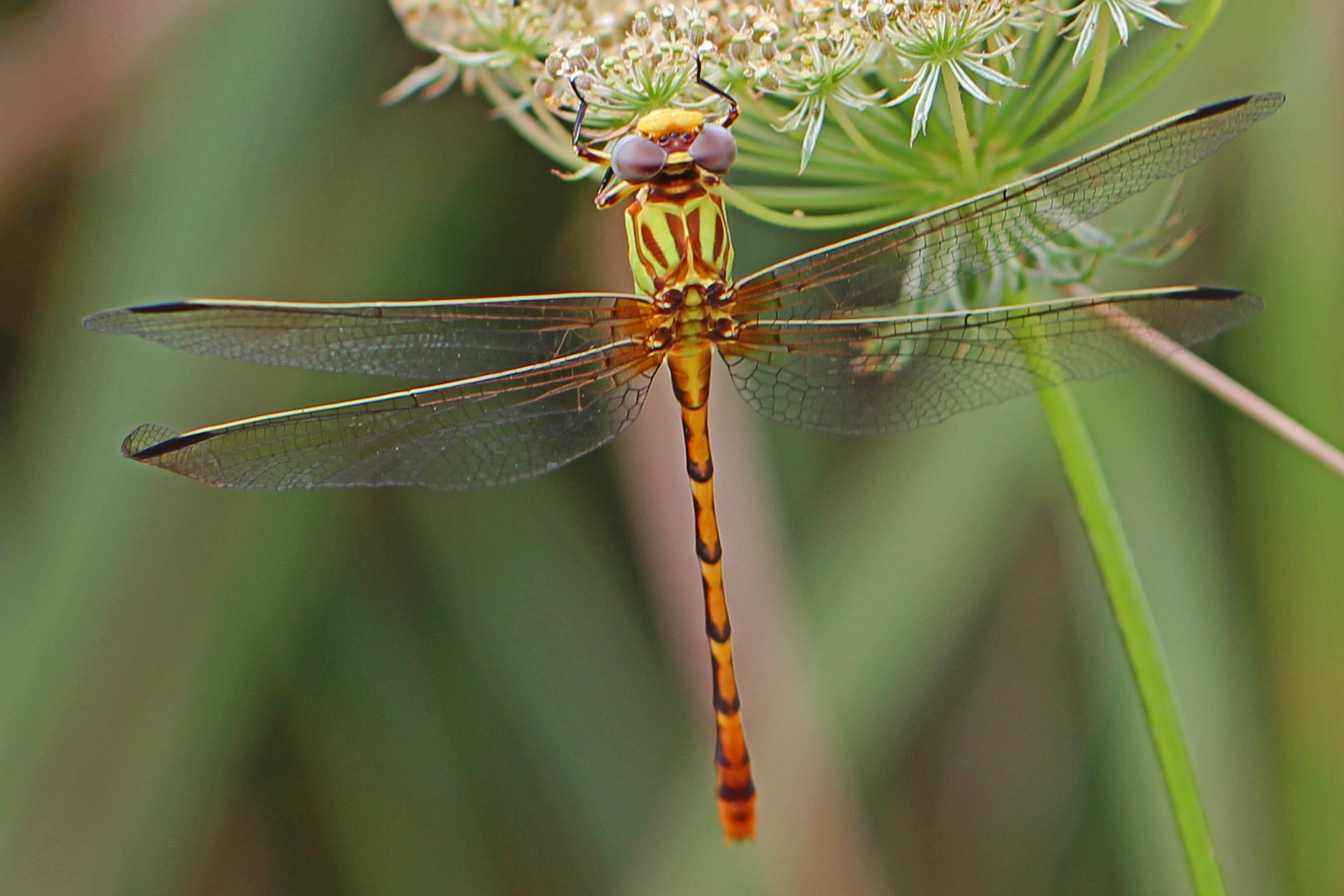

Conservation status
- Least Concern (IUCN 3.1)

Scientific classification
- Kingdom: Animalia
- Phylum: Arthropoda
- Class: Insecta
- Order: Odonata
- Infraorder: Anisoptera
- Family: Gomphidae
- Genus: Erpetogomphus
- Species: E. designatus

Binomial name
- Erpetogomphus designatus Hagen in Selys, 1858

= Erpetogomphus designatus =

Species of dragonfly

Erpetogomphus designatus, the eastern ringtail, is a species of clubtail in the dragonfly family Gomphidae. It is found in Central America and North America.

The IUCN conservation status of Erpetogomphus designatus is "LC", least concern, with no immediate threat to the species' survival. The population is stable. The IUCN status was reviewed in 2017.

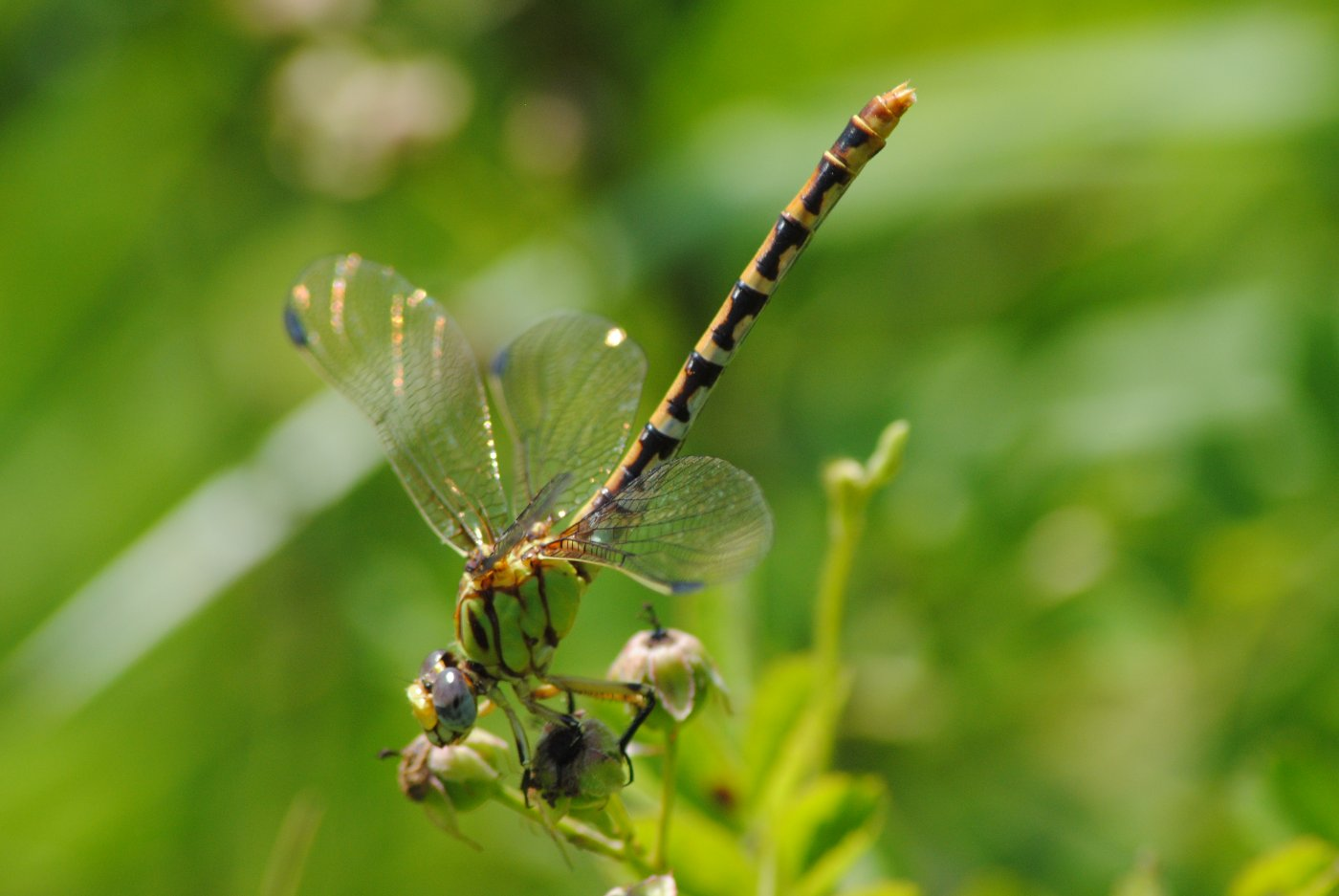
Eastern ringtail, Erpetogomphus designatus

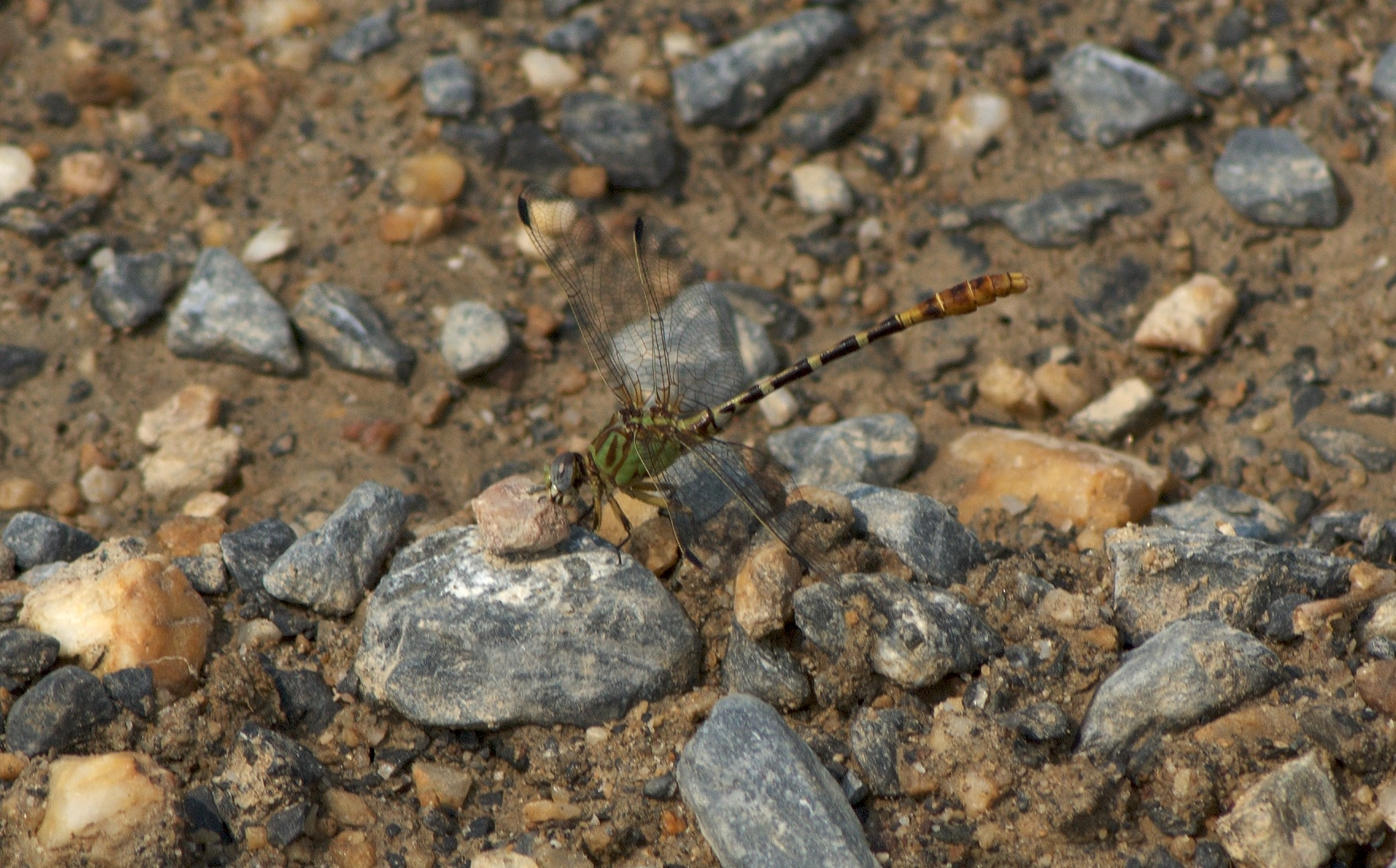
Eastern ringtail, Erpetogomphus designatus
