= Erpetogomphus crotalinus =

Conservation status
- Least Concern (IUCN 3.1)

Scientific classification
- Domain: Eukaryota
- Kingdom: Animalia
- Phylum: Arthropoda
- Class: Insecta
- Order: Odonata
- Infraorder: Anisoptera
- Family: Gomphidae
- Genus: Erpetogomphus
- Species: E. crotalinus

Binomial name
- Erpetogomphus crotalinus (Hagen in Selys, 1854)

Species of dragonfly

Erpetogomphus crotalinus, the yellow-legged ringtail, is a species of clubtail in the family of dragonflies known as Gomphidae. It is found in Central America, North America, and South America.

The IUCN conservation status of Erpetogomphus crotalinus is "LC", least concern, with no immediate threat to the species' survival.
