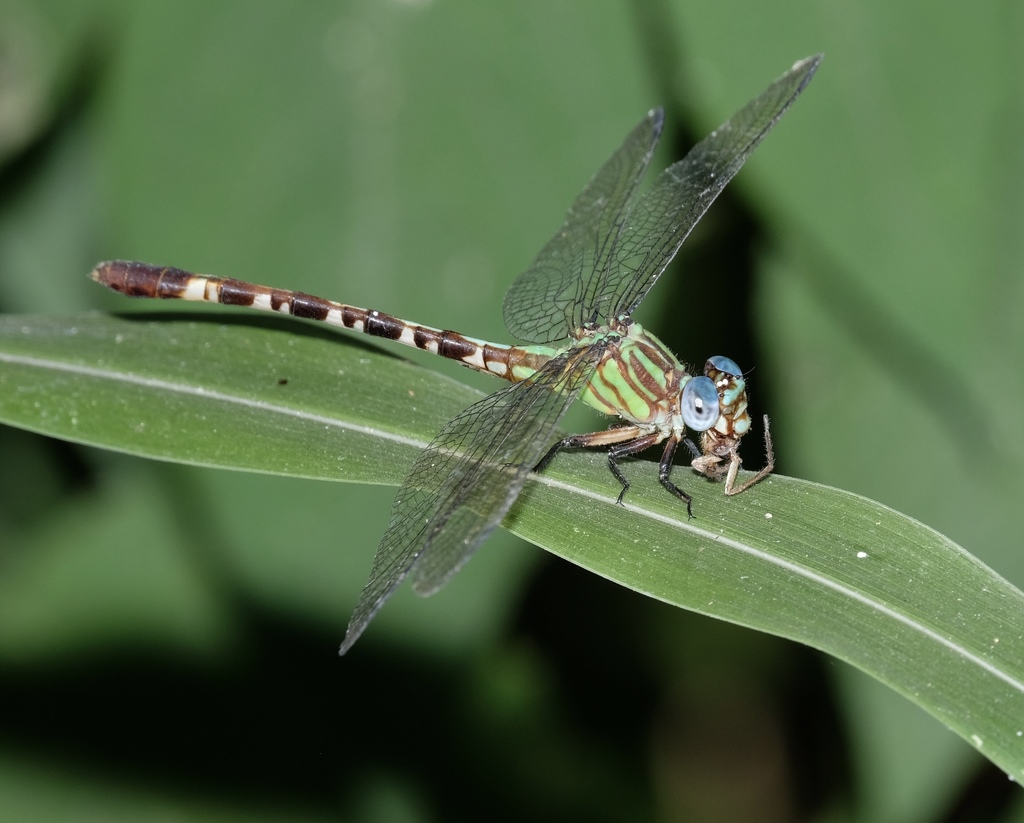

Conservation status
- Least Concern (IUCN 3.1)

Scientific classification
- Domain: Eukaryota
- Kingdom: Animalia
- Phylum: Arthropoda
- Class: Insecta
- Order: Odonata
- Infraorder: Anisoptera
- Family: Gomphidae
- Genus: Erpetogomphus
- Species: E. eutainia

Binomial name
- Erpetogomphus eutainia Calvert, 1905

= Erpetogomphus eutainia =

Species of dragonfly

Erpetogomphus eutainia, the blue-faced ringtail, is a species of clubtail in the family of dragonflies known as Gomphidae. It is found in Central America and North America.

The IUCN conservation status of Erpetogomphus eutainia is "LC", least concern, with no immediate threat to the species' survival.
