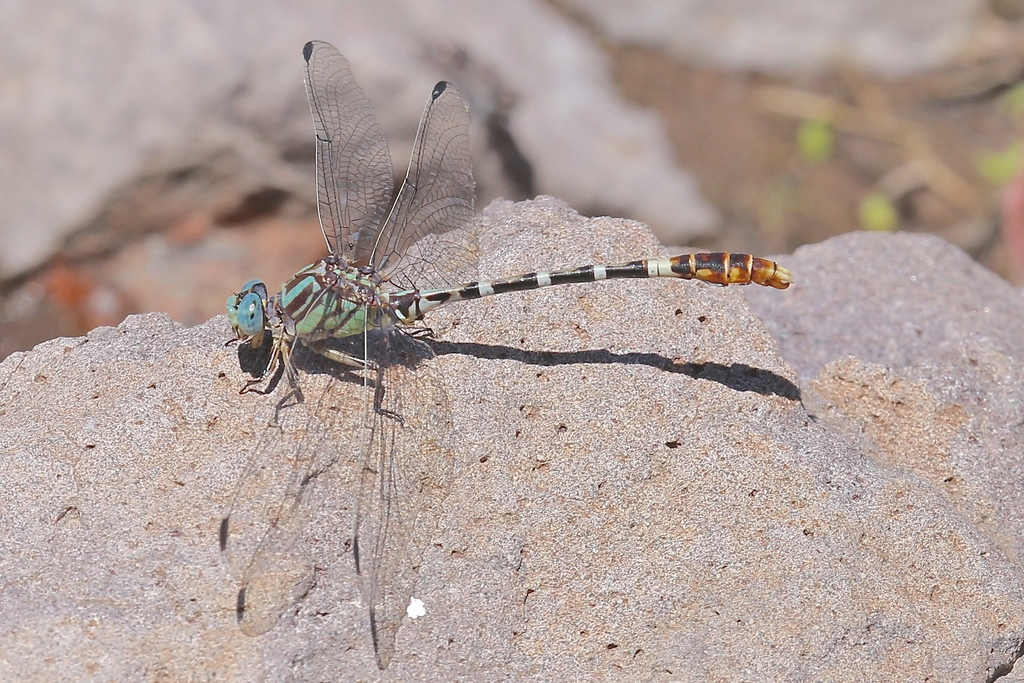

Conservation status
- Least Concern (IUCN 3.1)

Scientific classification
- Kingdom: Animalia
- Phylum: Arthropoda
- Class: Insecta
- Order: Odonata
- Infraorder: Anisoptera
- Family: Gomphidae
- Genus: Erpetogomphus
- Species: E. lampropeltis

Binomial name
- Erpetogomphus lampropeltis Kennedy, 1918

= Erpetogomphus lampropeltis =

Species of dragonfly

Erpetogomphus lampropeltis, the serpent ringtail, is a species of dragonfly in the family Gomphidae. It is found in Mexico and the United States.
