= Leptopharsa oblonga =

Scientific classification
- Domain: Eukaryota
- Kingdom: Animalia
- Phylum: Arthropoda
- Class: Insecta
- Order: Hemiptera
- Suborder: Heteroptera
- Family: Tingidae
- Genus: Leptopharsa
- Species: L. oblonga

Binomial name
- Leptopharsa oblonga (Say, 1825)

Synonyms
- Tingis oblonga Say, 1825

Species of true bug

Leptopharsa oblonga is a species of lace bug in the family Tingidae. It is found in North America.
