= Cephalotes maya =

Scientific classification
- Domain: Eukaryota
- Kingdom: Animalia
- Phylum: Arthropoda
- Class: Insecta
- Order: Hymenoptera
- Family: Formicidae
- Subfamily: Myrmicinae
- Genus: Cephalotes
- Species: C. maya

Binomial name
- Cephalotes maya De Andrade, 1999

Extinct species of ant

Cephalotes maya is an extinct species of arboreal ant of the genus Cephalotes, characterized by an odd shaped head and the ability to "parachute" by steering their fall if they drop off of the tree they're on. Giving their name also as gliding ants. The species was probably native of the Mexican state of Chiapas, however, lack of more evidence makes this uncertain. Their larger and flatter legs, a trait common with other members of the genus Cephalotes, gave them their gliding abilities.

The species was first given a description and a classification by Brazilian entomologist Maria de Andrade in 1999. It was subsequently described in Diversity and Adaptation in the Ant Genus Cephalotes Past and Present (Hymenoptera, Formicidae) as a sister group to Cephalotes foliaceus and was discovered fosillized in amber in the state of Chiapas in Mexico.

== Discovery ==
Cephalotes maya was probably native of Chiapas, although lack of sufficient evidence makes this uncertain. It was discovered fossilized in amber extracted in Mexico and is dated between the Burdigalian and Langhian ages of the Miocene, which means between 20.44 and 13,82 million years ago.
