= Leptopharsa heidemanni =

Scientific classification
- Domain: Eukaryota
- Kingdom: Animalia
- Phylum: Arthropoda
- Class: Insecta
- Order: Hemiptera
- Suborder: Heteroptera
- Family: Tingidae
- Subfamily: Tinginae
- Genus: Leptopharsa
- Species: L. heidemanni

Binomial name
- Leptopharsa heidemanni (Osborn & Drake, 1916)

Synonyms
- Leptostyla heidemanni Osborn and Drake, 1916

Species of true bug

Leptopharsa heidemanni is a species of lace bug in the family Tingidae. It is found in North America.
