= Hyptia floridana =

Scientific classification
- Kingdom: Animalia
- Phylum: Arthropoda
- Class: Insecta
- Order: Hymenoptera
- Family: Evaniidae
- Genus: Hyptia
- Species: H. floridana

Binomial name
- Hyptia floridana Ashmead, 1901

Species of wasp

Hyptia floridana is a species of ensign wasp in the family Evaniidae. It is found in Central America and North America.
