= Plicatodesmus =

Scientific classification
- Domain: Eukaryota
- Kingdom: Animalia
- Phylum: Arthropoda
- Subphylum: Myriapoda
- Class: Diplopoda
- Order: Polydesmida
- Family: Chelodesmidae
- Genus: Plicatodesmus; Peréz-Asso, 1995

Genus of millipede

Plicatodesmus is a genus of millipedes in the family Chelodesmidae.

== Species ==
There are three species recognised within the genus of Plicatodesmus:

- Plicatodesmus baire
- Plicatodesmus mariana
- Plicatodesmus turquino
