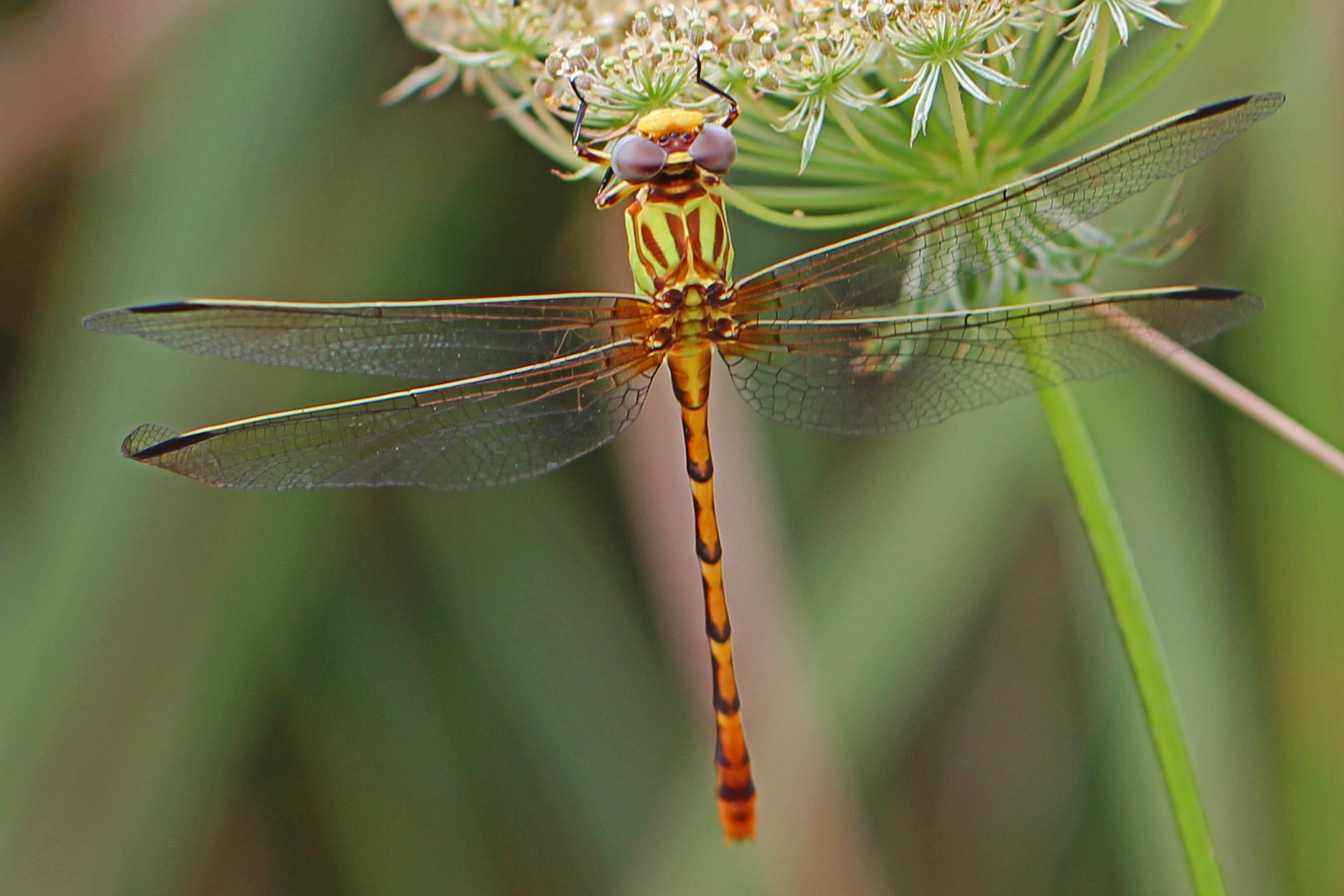
- Erpetogomphus designatus

Scientific classification
- Kingdom: Animalia
- Phylum: Arthropoda
- Class: Insecta
- Order: Odonata
- Infraorder: Anisoptera
- Family: Gomphidae
- Genus: Erpetogomphus; Selys, 1858

= Erpetogomphus =

Erpetogomphus Temporal range: Early Miocene to present

Genus of dragonflies

Erpetogomphus is a genus of dragonfly in the family Gomphidae. They are commonly known as ringtails. Most of the species are predominantly green coloured and the males have a moderately clubbed tail.

The genus contains the following species:

- Erpetogomphus agkistrodon Garrison, 1994
- Erpetogomphus boa Selys, 1859
- Erpetogomphus bothrops Garrison, 1994 – one-striped ringtail
- Erpetogomphus compositus Hagen in Selys, 1858 – white-belted ringtail
- Erpetogomphus constrictor Ris, 1918 – knob-tipped ringtail
- Erpetogomphus cophias Selys, 1858
- Erpetogomphus crotalinus (Hagen in Selys, 1854) – yellow-legged ringtail
- Erpetogomphus designatus Hagen in Selys, 1858 – eastern ringtail
- Erpetogomphus elaphe Garrison, 1994
- Erpetogomphus elaps Selys, 1858 – straight-tipped ringtail
- Erpetogomphus erici Novelo & Garrison, 1999
- Erpetogomphus eutainia Calvert, 1905 – blue-faced ringtail
- Erpetogomphus heterodon Garrison, 1994 – dashed ringtail
- Erpetogomphus lampropeltis Kennedy, 1918 – serpent ringtail
- Erpetogomphus leptophis Garrison, 1994 – dark-shouldered ringtail
- Erpetogomphus liopeltis Garrison, 1994
- Erpetogomphus ophibolus Calvert, 1905
- Erpetogomphus sabaleticus Williamson, 1918
- Erpetogomphus schausi Calvert, 1919
- Erpetogomphus sipedon Calvert, 1905
- Erpetogomphus tristani Calvert, 1912
- Erpetogomphus viperinus Selys, 1868

A single fossil species, †Erpetogomphus shii Zheng et al., 2018 known from the Early Miocene-aged Mexican amber
