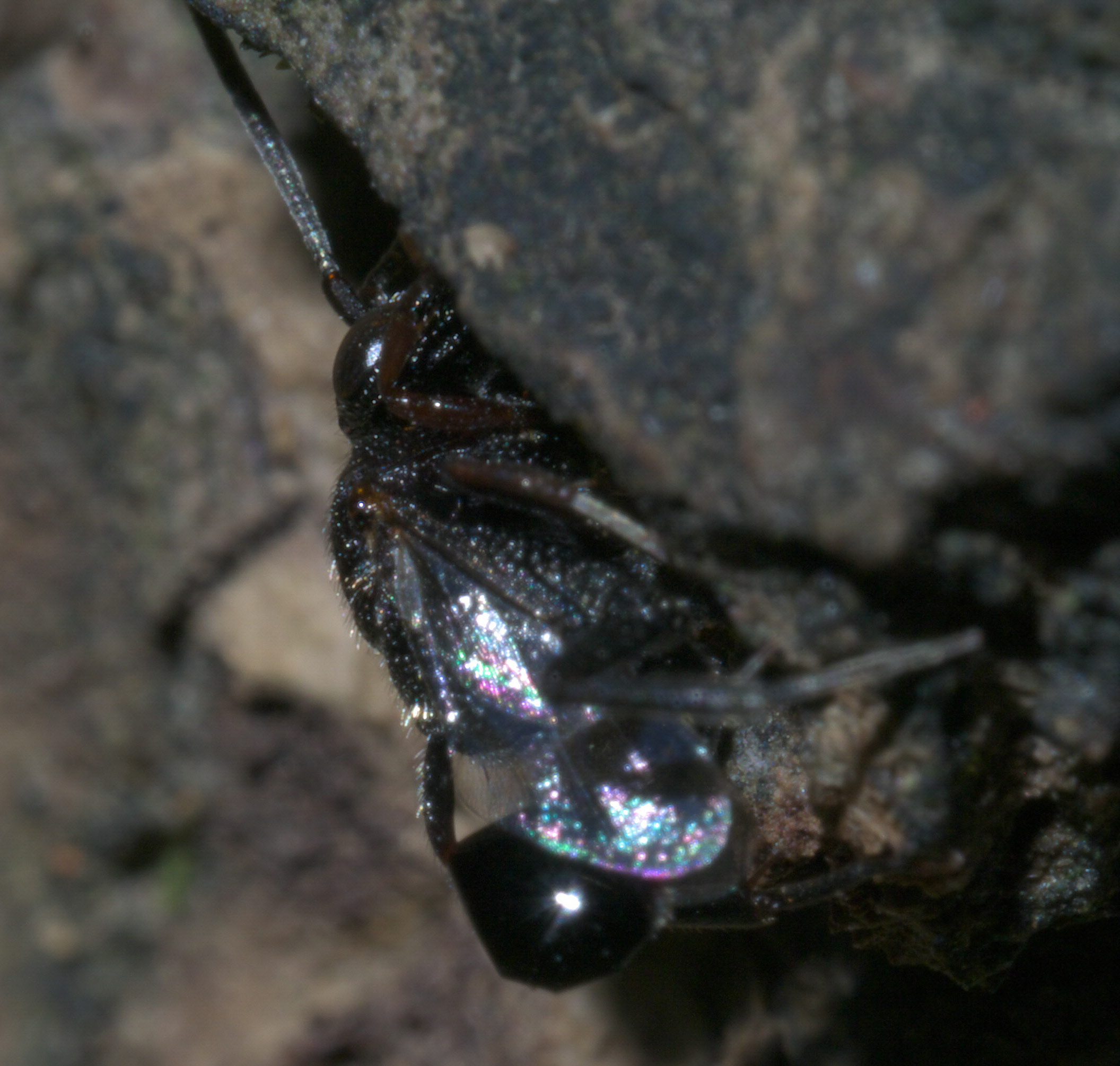

Scientific classification
- Kingdom: Animalia
- Phylum: Arthropoda
- Class: Insecta
- Order: Hymenoptera
- Family: Evaniidae
- Genus: Hyptia; Illiger, 1807

Synonyms
- Chalcidopterella Enderlein, 1909; Evaniellus Enderlein, 1905

= Hyptia =

Genus of wasps

Hyptia is a genus of ensign wasps in the family Evaniidae. There are at least 50 described species in Hyptia. Most Hyptia can be differentiated from other genera by heavily reduced venation of the forewings, wherein only one closed cell is present.

== Species ==
These 51 species belong to the genus Hyptia:

- Hyptia amazonica (Schletterer, 1886)^{i c g}
- Hyptia argenteiceps Kieffer, 1904^{i c g}
- Hyptia bakeri Bradley, 1908^{i c g}
- Hyptia bicolor (Westwood, 1841)^{i c g}
- Hyptia bradleyana Kieffer, 1910^{i c g}
- Hyptia brasiliensis Szépligeti, 1903^{i c g}
- Hyptia cameroni (Schletterer, 1889)^{i c g}
- Hyptia chalcidides Enderlein, 1901^{i c g}
- Hyptia chalcidipennis (Enderlein, 1905)^{i c g}
- Hyptia crassa (Cameron, 1888)^{i c g}
- Hyptia deansi Jennings, Krogmann & Mew^{g}
- Hyptia femorata Townes, 1949^{i c g}
- Hyptia festiva (Taschenberg, 1891)^{i c g}
- Hyptia floridana Ashmead, 1901^{i c g b}
- Hyptia fraudulenta Frison, 1922^{i c g}
- Hyptia fuchi Ashmead, 1901^{i c g}
- Hyptia gracilis (Enderlein, 1905)^{i c g}
- Hyptia guatemalensis (Cameron, 1888)^{i c g}
- Hyptia harpyoides Bradley, 1908^{i c g b}
- Hyptia hirsuta (Taschenberg, 1891)^{i c g}
- Hyptia johnsoni Ashmead, 1901^{i c g}
- Hyptia jucunda Frison, 1922^{i c g}
- Hyptia libertatis Brues, 1915^{i c g}
- Hyptia longistila (Kieffer, 1911)^{i c g}
- Hyptia lynchi Brèthes, 1913^{i c g}
- Hyptia macgillivrayi (Frison, 1922)^{i c g}
- Hyptia manni (Brues, 1916)^{i c g}
- Hyptia neglecta Frison, 1922^{i c g}
- Hyptia nigriventris Szépligeti, 1903^{i c g}
- Hyptia oblonga Townes, 1949^{i c g}
- Hyptia ocellaria (Schletterer, 1886)^{i c g}
- Hyptia pallidigena Kieffer, 1910^{i c g}
- Hyptia pauperrima Kieffer, 1904^{i c g}
- Hyptia peruanus (Enderlein, 1905)^{i c g}
- Hyptia petiolata (Fabricius, 1798)^{i c g}
- Hyptia pinarensis Alayo, 1972^{i c g}
- Hyptia poeyi (Guérin-Méneville, 1843)^{i c g}
- Hyptia reticulata (Say, 1837)^{i c g}
- Hyptia ruficeps (Shuckard, 1841)^{i c g}
- Hyptia rufipectus Dewitz, 1881^{i c g}
- Hyptia rufipes (Fabricius, 1804)^{i c g}
- Hyptia rufosignata Kieffer, 1904^{i c g}
- Hyptia rugosa (Cameron, 1887)^{i c g}
- Hyptia servillei (Guérin-Méneville, 1843)^{i c g}
- Hyptia similis Szépligeti, 1903^{i c g}
- Hyptia soror (Schletterer, 1886)^{i c g}
- Hyptia spinifera Frison, 1922^{i c g}
- Hyptia spinulosa Kieffer, 1911^{i c g}
- Hyptia stimulata (Schletterer, 1889)^{i c g}
- Hyptia thoracica (Blanchard, 1840)^{i c g}
- Hyptia weithi Ashmead, 1901^{i c g}

Data sources: i = ITIS, c = Catalogue of Life, g = GBIF, b = Bugguide.net
