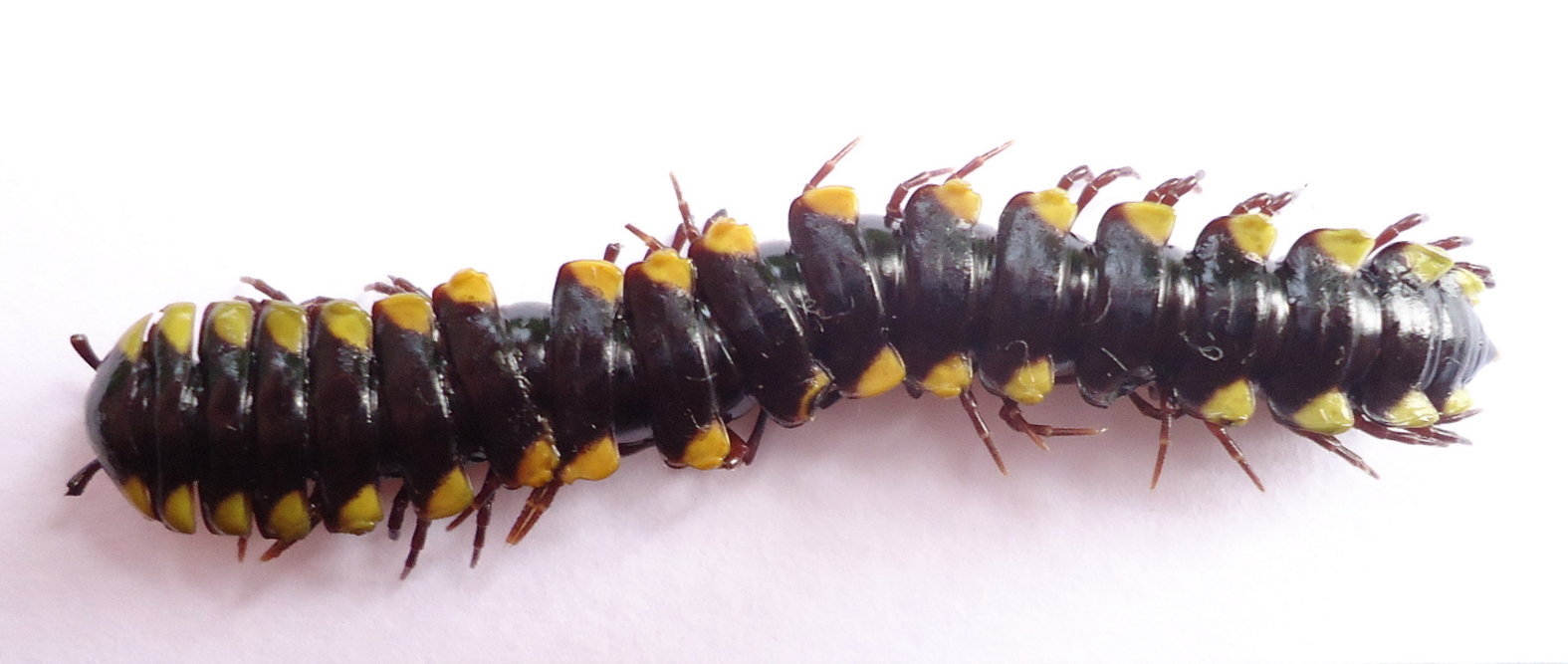
- Eucampesmella tricuspis, Brazil

Scientific classification
- Kingdom: Animalia
- Phylum: Arthropoda
- Subphylum: Myriapoda
- Class: Diplopoda
- Order: Polydesmida
- Suborder: Leptodesmidea
- Superfamily: Chelodesmoidea; Cook, 1895
- Family: Chelodesmidae; Cook, 1895

Diversity
- c. 219 genera, species

= Chelodesmidae =

Family of millipedes

Chelodesmidae is a millipede family of order Polydesmida. The family includes 219 genera. Two new genera were described in 2012.

== Genera ==
=== A ===
- Achromoporus
- Afolabina
- Alassodesmus
- Allarithmus
- Alocodesmus
- Alyssa
- Amphelictogon
- Amphipeltis
- Ancholeptodesmus
- Ancylochetus
- Aneurydesmus
- Angelodesmus
- Anisodesmus
- Ankylophallus
- Antillodesmus
- Antrogonodesmus
- Aplopododesmus
- Arthromachus
- Arthrosolaenomeris
- Astrophogonus
- Attemsiella
- Atylophor

=== B ===
- Basacantha
- Baianassa
- Batodesmus
- Beatadesmus
- Belonodesmus
- Benoitesmus
- Biaporus
- Biporodesmus
- Brachyurodesmus
- Brasilodesmus
- Brasiloschubartia

=== C ===
- Callistocilla
- Camptomorpha
- Camptomorphoides
- Cantabrodesmus
- Caracodesmus
- Caraibodesmus
- Carlopeltis
- Carloporus
- Catharodesmus
- Cayenniola
- Cearodesmus
- Centrogaster
- Cheirodesmus
- Cheirogonus
- Chelodesmus
- Chondrodesmoides
- Chondrodesmus
- Chondropeltis
- Chondrotropis
- Colombodesmus
- Congesmus
- Cordilleronomus
- Cordyloconus
- Cordyloporella
- Cordyloporus
- Cormodesmus
- Corystauchenus
- Craterodesmus
- Cryptoporatia
- Cryptosolenomeris
- Cubodesmus
- Cyclorhabdoides
- Cyclorhabdus
- Cypraeogona
- Cyrtaphe

=== D ===
- Delirus
- Desmacrides
- Desmoleptus
- Dialysogon
- Diaphorodesmus
- Diaphorodesmoides
- Diarcuaria
- Dirhabdophallus
- Doidesmus
- Drepanodesmus
- Dromodesmus
- Dyoparyphe

=== E ===
- Ecuadopeltis
- Ellipodesmus
- Entelopus
- Epiporopeltis
- Eressea
- Erythrodesmus
- Ethophallus
- Eucampesmella
- Eucampesmus
- Eucordyloporus
- Eumastostethus
- Eurydesmus
- Euthydesmus
- Eutyporhachis

=== G ===
- Gangugia
- Geminodesmus
- Gitadesmus
- Gonioleptodesmus
- Gonorygma
- Goyazodesmus
- Grallodesmus
- Granmadesmus
- Graphidochirus
- Guayapeltis

=== H ===
- Harpagodesmus
- Henrisaussurea
- Heptoporodesmus
- Heteropeltis
- Hoffmanodesmus
- Hypodesmus
- Hypselodesmus

=== I ===
- Igaraparana
- Iguazus
- Incodesmus
- Inconus
- Iphyria
- Isidrona
- Isodesmus

=== K ===
- Kisantus
- Kyphopyge

=== L ===
- Lasiomazus
- Leiodesmus
- Leiomodesmus
- Leptherpum
- Leptodesmus
- Lepturodesmus
- Liorhabdus
- Lipodesmus
- Loomisiola
- Lyrodesmus

=== M ===
- †Maatidesmus
- Macrocoxodesmus
- Mallotodesmus
- Manfredia
- Manfrediodesmus
- Maracayopus
- Melanodesmus
- Mesodesmus
- Micronchodesmus
- Morogorius
- Morphotelus

=== N ===
- Neocamptomorpha
- Neocordyloporus

=== O ===
- Obiricodesmus
- Odontokrepis
- Odontopeltis
- Odontotropis
- Oncoleptodesmus
- Oreodesmus

=== P ===
- Paltophorus
- Pandirodesmus
- Pansararium
- Paracordyloporus
- Parastenonia
- Peltoeurydesmus
- Perudesmus
- Peruprion
- Phantasmodesmus
- Phlyzakium
- Phylactophallus
- Pimodesmus
- Platinodesmus
- Platyurodesmus
- Plectrogonodesmus
- Pleuroarium
- Plicatodesmus
- Plusioporodesmus
- Podiscodesmus
- Pogonodesmus
- Prepodesmus
- Priodesmus
- Proletus
- Pseudoeurydesmella
- Pseudoeurydesmus
- Pseudoleptodesmus
- Pterygiodesmus
- Ptyxesmus

=== Q ===
- Quisquicia

=== R ===
- Raima
- Rhacophorus
- Rhaphandra
- Ricodesmus
- Rupidesmus

=== S ===
- Sandalodesmus
- Scaptodesmus
- Schistides
- Scolopopleura
- Solaenorhabdus
- Specioporus
- Stachyproctus
- Stenonia
- Stirosoma
- Stongylomorpha
- Storthotropis
- Strongylosomides
- Synecheporus

=== T ===
- Talamancia
- Tanzaniella
- Telonychopus
- Tessarithys
- Thanatomimus
- Thaumatodesmus
- Thymodesmus
- Tidasus
- Tomodesmus
- Trachelodesmus
- Triadesmus
- Trichomorpha
- Tuberodesmus
- Tunochilus
- Tylodesmus
- Typophallus

=== U ===
- Uberlandiodesmus

=== V ===
- Vigilia

=== W ===
- Watoporus

=== X ===
- Xeneurydesmus
- Xyodesmus

=== Y ===
- Yanadesmus

=== Z ===
- Zigwadesmus
