= Leptopharsa =

Scientific classification
- Kingdom: Animalia
- Phylum: Arthropoda
- Clade: Pancrustacea
- Class: Insecta
- Order: Hemiptera
- Suborder: Heteroptera
- Family: Tingidae
- Subfamily: Tinginae
- Genus: Leptopharsa; Stål, 1873

Diversity
- at least 120 species

Genus of true bugs

Leptopharsa is a genus of lace bugs in the family Tingidae. There are more than 120 described species in Leptopharsa.

== See also ==
- List of Leptopharsa species
