= Balumtun Sandstone =

Geologic formation in Mexico

- Stratigraphic range: Aquitanian; ~23–22.5 Ma
- Type: Formation
- Unit of: Río Concepción Group
- Underlies: Tulijá Formation
- Overlies: Mazantic Shale
- Thickness: 760 metres

Lithology
- Primary: Sandstone
- Other: Conglomerate

Location
- Coordinates: 17.1°N 92.7°W
- Approximate paleocoordinates: 17.7°N 89.0°W
- Region: Chiapas
- Country: Mexico

Type section
- Named for: Balumtun

The Balumtun Sandstone is a geologic formation in Chiapas, Mexico. The formation is up to 760 metres thick, and consists of gray sandstone, that were deposited during the Upper Aquitanian stage of the Early Miocene.

== See also ==
- List of fossiliferous stratigraphic units in Mexico
- Mexican amber
