= Mazantic Shale =

Geologic formation in Chiapas, Mexico

- Stratigraphic range: Miocene, Aquitanian
- Type: Formation
- Underlies: Balumtum Sandstone
- Overlies: La Quinta Formation
- Thickness: 310 m

Lithology
- Primary: Shale

Location
- Country: Mexico

The Mazantic Shale is a geologic formation in Chiapas, Mexico. It was deposited during the Early Miocene (Aquitanian). The formation comprises dark gray shales that were deposited in a marine environment. It preserves fossils, such as the turtle Allaeochelys liliae. Amber has been recovered from it.

== See also ==
- List of fossiliferous stratigraphic units in Mexico
