= Simojovel =

- Municipality

- Location in Mexico
- Coordinates: 17°09′N 92°43′W
- Country: Mexico
- State: Chiapas
- Municipal seat: Simojovel de Allende

Government
  - Presidente Municipal: José Amir Pérez Conde (2008–10)

Area
  - Total: 446.99 km^{2} (172.58 sq mi)

Population (2010)
  - Total: 40,297
- Website: http://www.simojovel.chiapas.gob.mx

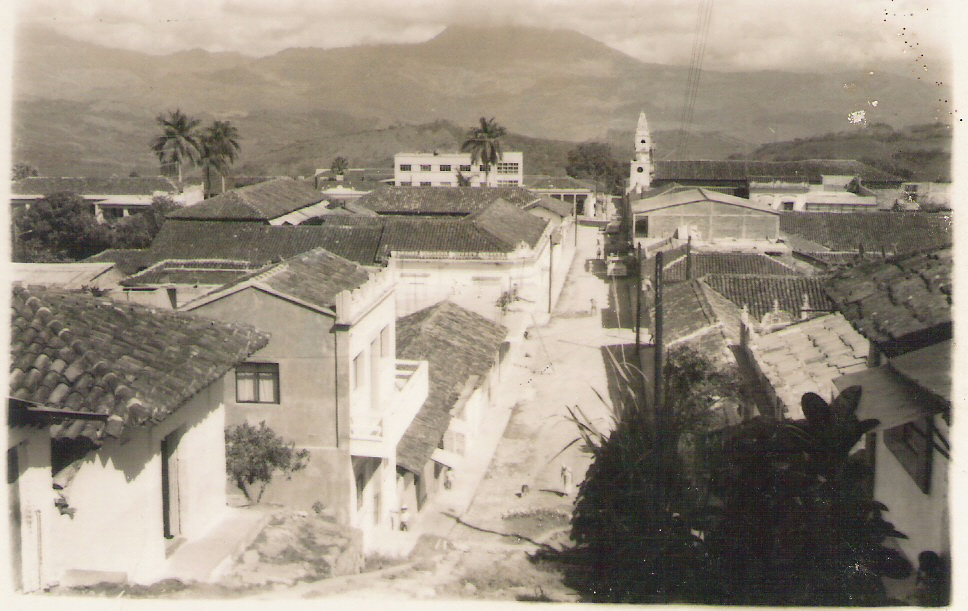
View of Simojovel in 1987

Simojovel is a municipality in the Mexican state of Chiapas in southern Mexico.

As of 2010, the municipality had a total population of 40,297, up from 31,615 as of 2005. It covers an area of 446.99 km^{2}.

The municipality had 145 localities, the largest of which (with 2010 populations in parentheses) were: Simojovel de Allende (10,762), the municipal seat classified as urban, and Pueblo Nuevo Sitala (2,437), La Pimienta (1,755), El Jardín (1,626), La Ceiba (1,275), Las Maravillas (1,204), and Constitución (1,103), classified as rural.

== Climate ==
Climate data for Simojovel (1991–2020)
| Month | Jan | Feb | Mar | Apr | May | Jun | Jul | Aug | Sep | Oct | Nov | Dec | Year |
|---|---|---|---|---|---|---|---|---|---|---|---|---|---|
| Record high °C (°F) | 37.5 (99.5) | 37.0 (98.6) | 39.0 (102.2) | 40.0 (104.0) | 40.0 (104.0) | 39.0 (102.2) | 39.0 (102.2) | 39.5 (103.1) | 38.5 (101.3) | 40.5 (104.9) | 39.5 (103.1) | 36.5 (97.7) | 40.5 (104.9) |
| Mean daily maximum °C (°F) | 24.7 (76.5) | 26.1 (79.0) | 28.0 (82.4) | 30.0 (86.0) | 29.9 (85.8) | 28.6 (83.5) | 29.1 (84.4) | 28.8 (83.8) | 27.8 (82.0) | 26.7 (80.1) | 25.5 (77.9) | 25.0 (77.0) | 27.5 (81.5) |
| Daily mean °C (°F) | 19.7 (67.5) | 20.8 (69.4) | 22.3 (72.1) | 24.0 (75.2) | 24.3 (75.7) | 23.5 (74.3) | 23.8 (74.8) | 23.6 (74.5) | 23.2 (73.8) | 22.3 (72.1) | 20.8 (69.4) | 19.9 (67.8) | 22.4 (72.3) |
| Mean daily minimum °C (°F) | 14.6 (58.3) | 15.4 (59.7) | 16.5 (61.7) | 18.0 (64.4) | 18.6 (65.5) | 18.4 (65.1) | 18.4 (65.1) | 18.5 (65.3) | 18.5 (65.3) | 17.8 (64.0) | 16.0 (60.8) | 14.7 (58.5) | 17.1 (62.8) |
| Record low °C (°F) | 1.7 (35.1) | 1.5 (34.7) | 9.0 (48.2) | 10.0 (50.0) | 10.0 (50.0) | 8.0 (46.4) | 10.0 (50.0) | 10.0 (50.0) | 10.0 (50.0) | 10.0 (50.0) | 8.0 (46.4) | 9.5 (49.1) | 1.5 (34.7) |
| Average precipitation mm (inches) | 78.8 (3.10) | 64.6 (2.54) | 47.6 (1.87) | 71.8 (2.83) | 152.5 (6.00) | 317.6 (12.50) | 231.6 (9.12) | 316.7 (12.47) | 396.2 (15.60) | 245.7 (9.67) | 161.7 (6.37) | 98.1 (3.86) | 2,182.9 (85.94) |
| Average precipitation days (≥ 0.1 mm) | 10.7 | 7.2 | 6.1 | 5.8 | 11.7 | 20.6 | 17.5 | 18.9 | 21.8 | 17.1 | 12.9 | 9.7 | 160.0 |
Source: Servicio Meteorologico Nacional

== Economy ==
Until 1990, the majority of the population worked on the harvest of coffee, but today mining and the Chiapan amber trade are the most important economic activities.

It is also known for its gastronomic traditions inherited from their ancient Mayan ancestors, and for cooking 'zats', a tree worm that grows in 'caulote' trees typical of the region (known there as 'tapaculo'), as well as the 'yervamora', a seasonal vegetable, a chili variety 'simojovel' native to the town region, and the 'suy' prepared food.

Native inhabitants of Simojovel do not allow tourists or foreign visitors interviews, as a measure to protect their patrimony and non-ethical profit.
