= Mastotermes electromexicus =

Mastotermes electromexicus Temporal range: Late Oligocene - early Miocene

Scientific classification
- Kingdom: Animalia
- Phylum: Arthropoda
- Class: Insecta
- Order: Blattodea
- Infraorder: Isoptera
- Family: Mastotermitidae
- Genus: Mastotermes
- Species: †M. electromexicus

Binomial name
- †Mastotermes electromexicus Krishna & Emerson, 1983

Extinct species of termite

Mastotermes electromexicus is an extinct species of termite in the family Mastotermitidae known from a group of Late Oligocene to Early Miocene fossils found in Mexico. M. electromexicus is the only species in the genus Mastotermes to have been described from fossils found in Mexican amber and was the first member of the genus described from the New World. The only living species of Mastotermes is Mastotermes darwiniensis which is found in tropical regions of Northern Australia.

== History and classification ==
Mastotermes electromexicus is known from a series of fourteen fossil insects which are inclusions in transparent chunks of Mexican amber. The amber specimens, a soldier, an imago and twelve nymphs are currently housed in the fossil collection of the University of California, Berkeley in Berkeley, California. The holotype fossil is composed of a partial soldier caste individual. Mexican amber is recovered from fossil bearing rocks in the Simojovel region of Chiapas, Mexico. The amber dates from between 22.5 million years old, for the youngest sediments of the Balumtun Sandstone, and 26 million years old La Quinta Formation. This age range straddles the boundary between the Late Oligocene and Early Miocene and is complicated by both formations being secondary deposits for the amber, the age range is only the youngest that it might be. The holotype was first studied by entomologists Kumar Krishna of the American Museum of Natural History and Alfred Emerson of the University of Chicago. Krishna and Emerson's 1983 type description of the species was published in the natural sciences journal American Museum Novitates. The specific epithet electromexicus was coined from the Greek word "ēlektron" meaning amber combined with Mexico as a reference to the nature of the preservation and the country of the type locality.

== Description ==
The Mastotermes electromexicus soldier is known from only a portion of the head and mandible. The head is estimated to have been 3.60 millimetres (0.142 in) wide with long hairs on each side of the head below the antennae. The mandibles are gently curved inwards, in contrast to those of M. darwiniensis which are a more curved and having a hooked appearance. The imago is known from a partial head, thorax, and hind wings. The 4.15 millimetres (0.163 in) wide head of the imago is wider than seen in M. darwiniensis with smaller eyes and ocelli which do not touch the compound eyes. The nymphs are known from a series of partial fossils in thirteen pieces of amber and representing several different instars. The heads vary between 2.56 and 3.54 millimetres (0.101 and 0.139 in), showing a larger range of size then those of M. darwiniensis. The antennae have approximately twenty four segments, flagellomeres, and the legs host a number of bristles and several short spines.
