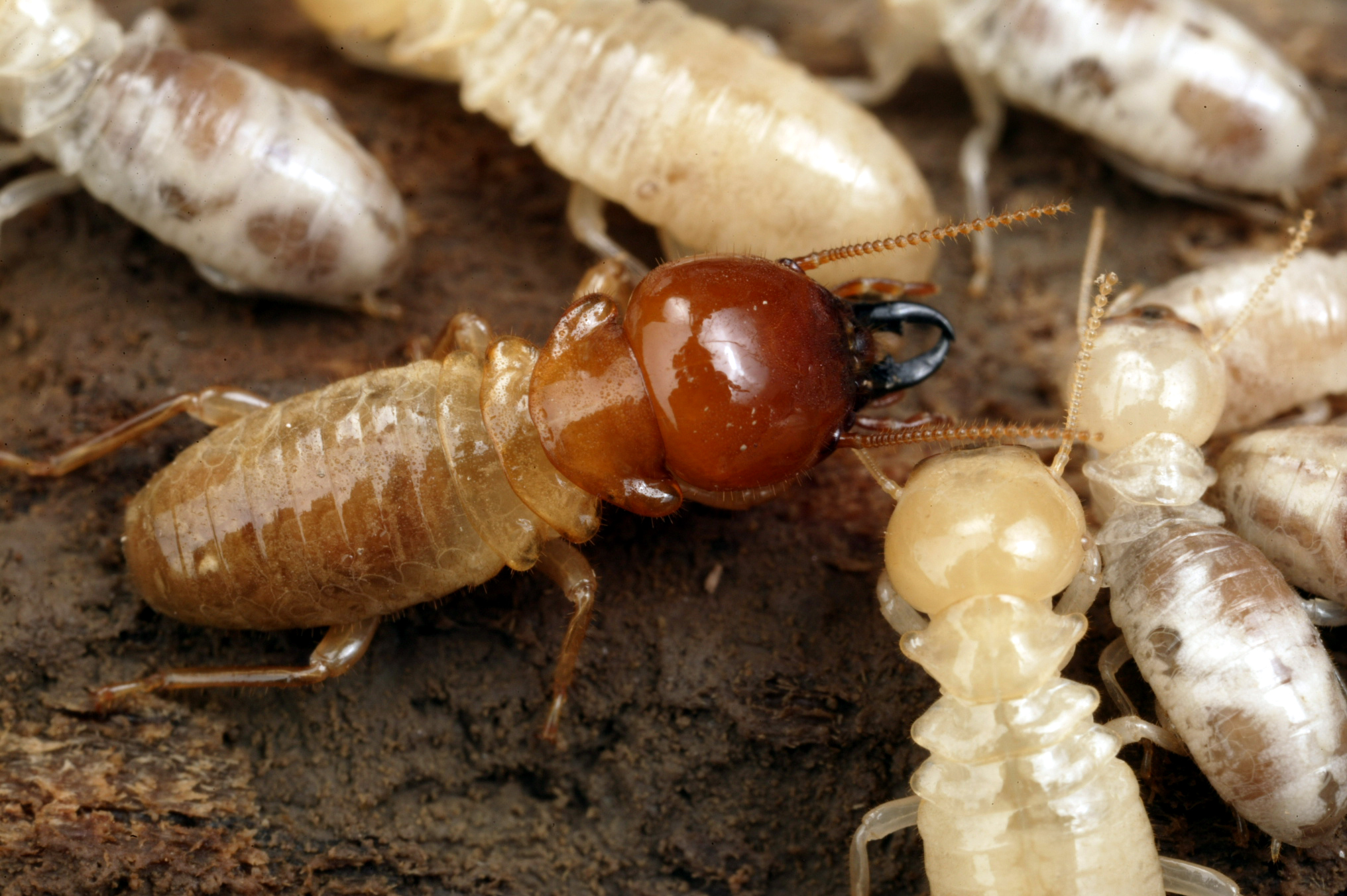
- Mastotermes darwiniensis

Scientific classification
- Kingdom: Animalia
- Phylum: Arthropoda
- Class: Insecta
- Order: Blattodea
- Infraorder: Isoptera
- Family: Mastotermitidae
- Genus: Mastotermes; Froggatt, 1897

Species
- See text

= Mastotermes =

Mastotermes Temporal range: Cretaceous–Recent

Genus of termites

Mastotermes is a genus of termites. The sole living species is Mastotermes darwiniensis, found only in northern Australia. A number of extinct taxa are known from fossils. It is a very peculiar insect, the most primitive termite alive. As such, it shows notable similarities to cockroaches in the family Cryptocercidae, the termites' closest relatives. These similarities include the anal lobe of the wing and the laying of eggs in bunches, rather than singly. The termites were traditionally placed in the Exopterygota, but such an indiscriminate treatment makes that group a paraphyletic grade of basal neopterans. Thus, the cockroaches, termites and their relatives are nowadays placed in a clade called Dictyoptera.

These singular termites appear at first glance like a cockroaches abdomen with a termite's head and thorax. Their wings have the same design as those of the cockroaches, and its eggs are laid in a case as are cockroach eggs. It is thought to have evolved from the same ancestors as the wood roaches (Cryptocercus) in the Late Jurassic or Early Cretaceous. Fossil wings have been discovered in the Permian of Kansas which have a close resemblance to wings of Mastotermes of the Mastotermitidae, which is the most primitive living termite. This fossil species is Pycnoblattina. It folded its wings in a convex pattern between segments 1a and 2a. Mastotermes darwiniensis is the only living insect that does the same. However, Pycnoblattina has been demonstrated to be unrelated to termites and the earliest termites are from the latest Jurassic-earliest Cretaceous. Unlike cockroaches, not all termites have wings: Only the reproductives, (see Termites-life cycle) whose wings are considerably longer than their abdomen. Mastotermes darwiniensis is usually not very numerous, nor are the colonies large when left to natural conditions. However, when given abundant water(such as regular irrigation) and favourable food & soil conditions (such as stored timber or timber structures), populations can be enormous, numbering in the millions, quickly destroying their host. Its diet is varied, as it will eat introduced plants, damage ivory and leather, and wood and debris, in fact almost anything organic. It becomes a major agricultural pest, to the extent that vegetable farming has been virtually abandoned in Northern Australia wherever this termite is numerous, which it is outside of the rain forest or bauxite soils. It has developed the ability to bore up into a living tree and ring bark it such that it dies and becomes the center of a colony.

Mastotermes darwiniensis is the only known host of the symbiotic protozoan Mixotricha paradoxa, remarkable for its multiple bacterial symbionts.

== Fossil species ==
Numerous extinct taxa have been described in the genus Mastotermes. The genus had a worldwide distribution until just a few million years ago, when all but the M. darwiniensis became extinct.

Fossil species of Mastotermes include:

- Mastotermes aethiopicus Engel, Currano, & Jacobs, 2016 Ethiopia, Miocene
- Mastotermes anglicus Rosen, 1913 (Bembridge Marls, England, Priabonian
- Mastotermes bournemouthensis Rosen, 1913 (Late Eocene of England)
- Mastotermes croaticus Rosen, 1913 (Early Miocene of Croatia)
- Mastotermes electrodominicus Krishna & Grimaldi, 1991 (Early Miocene of the Dominican Republic)
- Mastotermes electromexicus Krishna & Emerson, 1983 (Late Oligocene to Early Miocene Mexican amber)
- Mastotermes gallica Nel, 1986 (Early Oligocene of France)
- Mastotermes haidingeri (Heer, 1849) (Early Miocene of Croatia)
- Mastotermes heerii (Göppert, 1855) (Late Oligocene of Poland) – tentatively placed in Mastotermes
- Mastotermes krishnorum Wappler & Engel, 2006 (Middle Eocene of Germany)
- Mastotermes minor Pongrácz, 1928 (Early Miocene of Croatia)
- Mastotermes minutus Nel & Bourguet, 2006 (Eocene of France)
- Mastotermes monostichus Zhao et al. 2019 Burmese amber, Myanmar, Cenomanian
- Mastotermes nepropadyom Vršanský and Aristov 2014 Doronino Formation, Russia, Barremian
- Mastotermes picardi Nel & Paicheler, 1993 (Late Oligocene of France)
- Mastotermes sarthensis Schlüter, 1989 Bezonnais amber, France, Cenomanian
- Mastotermites stuttgartensis Armbruster, 1941 (Middle Miocene of Germany) – tentatively placed in Mastotermes

== Sources ==
- Weesner, F. M. (January 1960). "Evolution and biology of the termites". Annual Review of Entomology. 5: 153–170. doi:10.1146/annurev.en.05.010160.001101.
- "Mastotermitidae".
