= Snyderella =

Scientific classification
- Domain: Eukaryota
- Phylum: Metamonada
- Class: Hypermastigia
- Order: Cristamonadida
- Family: Calonymphidae
- Genus: Snyderella; Kirby, 1929

Type species
- Snyderella tabogae

Genus of multinucleate flagellates

Snyderella (snaɪ.dəˈrɛl.ə) is a genus of large, multinucleate parabasalid flagellates. These protists are obligate symbionts and are found in the hindguts of wood-feeding termites, where they contribute to cellulose digestion in the digestion of cellulose and wood. This genus exhibits a number of unique cellular features, including the presence of akaryomastigonts and a distinctive axostylar arrangement. The evolutionary trajectory of Snyderella is thought to be closely linked to the evolution of its termite hosts, with coevolution shaping its cellular and metabolic characteristics over time.

== Type species ==
The type species of Snyderella is Snyderella tabogae, first discovered by Kirby in 1929 in the termite Cryptotermes longicollis from Taboga Island, Panama. More recent research has utilized molecular sequencing techniques to explore the metabolism of Snyderella, shedding light on its complex interactions with termite gut microbiota and its unique role in cellulose digestion.

== History of knowledge ==
Early studies of this genus were conducted using light microscopy, which allowed Kirby (1929) to identify its distinctive multinucleate structure and akaryomastigont morphology. Later studies expanded upon the findings of Kirby (1929), particularly with the advent of electron microscopy, which revealed more detailed cellular features, such as the arrangement of nuclei in circular rows. In the 1990s, molecular phylogenetic tools were employed to investigate the evolutionary relationships within Snyderella and its relatives, revealing its placement within the family Calonymphidae.

== Evolutionary history ==
Molecular analyses indicate that Snyderella is a calonymphid distinct from other related genera such as Calonympha and Stephanonympha, but its precise phylogenetic placement remains somewhat unresolved. One of the key evolutionary events in the history of Snyderella was the loss of nuclear connections characteristic of karyomastigonts, leading to the exclusive presence of akaryomastigonts. This transition resulted in the migration of the nucleus away from the cell periphery and the proliferation of akaryomastigonts, enhancing locomotion. Termite fossil and molecular data suggest that Snyderella emerged during the mid-Mesozoic, roughly coinciding with the diversification of lower termites. The symbiotic relationship between Snyderella and termites likely played a significant role in shaping the evolutionary trajectory of the genus, with selective pressures favoring adaptations that enhance wood digestion. Further genomic studies have suggested that Snyderella has undergone unique gene duplications that enable it to interact more effectively with termite gut microbiota, suggesting a pattern of coevolution between the flagellate and its hosts.

Snyderella species are obligate symbionts that inhabit the hindguts of lower termites, particularly those in the families Kalotermitidae and Rhinotermitidae. These termites rely on Snyderella and other microorganisms to break down cellulose and wood, which constitute the majority of their diet. The relationship between Snyderella and termites is highly specialized, with different Snyderella species showing host specificity. For example, Snyderella species can be found in termite genera such as Cryptotermes, Calcaritermes, and Rugitermes. The flagellates assist in the digestion of wood by breaking down cellulose fibers into simpler compounds, thereby providing nutrients to their termite hosts.

== Morphological features ==
Snyderella species are large, multinucleate flagellates with distinctive cellular features. They are characterized by akaryomastigonts and a unique axostylar arrangement. The cells of Snyderella are typically pear-shaped, with a tapering anterior region densely populated by flagella. The posterior region, in contrast, is flagella-free and is rich in wood particles and bacterial symbionts. The flagella are primarily located at the anterior end, where they form spiral rows, while the axostyles extend longitudinally from a central axostylar bundle, contributing to the flagellates' distinctive bending movement. In some species, such as Snyderella valdivia, the cell shape is more rounded or ellipsoid, measuring 50–75 μm in length and 35–55 μm in width, compared to the classic pear-shaped form of Snyderella tabogae. This morphological structure, combined with the cell's unique flagellar arrangement, enables Snyderella to move through the termite gut via a characteristic bending motion. The posterior region of Snyderella cells is often colonized by bacterial ectosymbionts, including rod-shaped and spirochete-like bacteria, which further enhance the flagellate's ability to digest wood.

== Molecular features ==
Snyderella species are characterized by the presence of 50–100 nuclei arranged in circular rows within the apical region of the cell. Phylogenetic analyses based on SSU rRNA sequencing support the monophyly of Snyderella, showing significant divergence among species. Recent genomic studies have also revealed that Snyderella has undergone gene duplications that enhance its ability to interact with termite gut microbiota. These findings suggest that Snyderella has developed specialized molecular mechanisms that aid in wood digestion and help it maintain a stable symbiotic relationship with its termite hosts.

== Growth and reproduction ==
Snyderella reproduces asexually. In this process, nuclear division occurs at similar times across multiple nuclei, with karyokinesis and cytokinesis separated spatially and temporally. Unlike many protists, the nuclear envelope remains intact during division, and rounded offspring nuclei form during both early and late anaphase. The interphase cell gradually integrates, developing a conical anterior region and a rounded posterior, which is key to the process of division through budding. This unique reproductive strategy allows Snyderella to rapidly proliferate within the termite gut, where environmental factors such as pH and nutrient availability influence the timing and rate of reproduction.

== Practical importance ==
Currently, Snyderella has no direct practical uses for humans, however the genus plays a role in the digestion of wood in termites, thus facilitating the breakdown of plant material in forest ecosystems. This function contributes to nutrient cycling and the overall health of these ecosystems.
