= Marginitermes hubbardi =

Scientific classification
- Domain: Eukaryota
- Kingdom: Animalia
- Phylum: Arthropoda
- Class: Insecta
- Order: Blattodea
- Infraorder: Isoptera
- Family: Kalotermitidae
- Genus: Marginitermes
- Species: M. hubbardi

Binomial name
- Marginitermes hubbardi (Banks in Banks & Snyder, 1920)

Species of termite

Marginitermes hubbardi, commonly known as the light western drywood termite, is a species of termite in the family Kalotermitidae. It is found in Central America and desert regions of southwestern North America.

== Description ==
This species is known as the light western drywood termite because the winged reproductives (the only forms seen in the open) are a much paler colour than those of Incisitermes minor, the dark western drywood termite. The alates are about 0.5 in (13 mm) long and a yellowish color with pale wings. The soldiers are recognisable by the elongated, club-shaped third segment of their antennae.

== Distribution and habitat ==
This termite is native to Central America, Mexico, California and southern and central Arizona. It is normally found below 4,000 m (13,000 ft), and in Arizona is replaced by I. minor in the higher parts of the state. It is more tolerant of extreme aridity than I. minor and prefers drier conditions. Its natural hosts are trees such as cottonwoods in canyons and near riverbeds, and it will colonise the remains of dead saguaro cacti. With increased urbanization of its habitat, it is colonizing human built structures, with timber-framed homes being particularly at risk.

== Ecology ==
Marginitermes hubbardi is a drywood termite; this means that after the nuptial flight, a male and female will form their new colony directly in sound dry timber without a terrestrial or dampwood phase. Individual termites will search for a nest site in a hole or crevice in suitable dry wood. The alate sheds its wings either before entering the hole, or inside it. The termite has tergal glands on its abdomen which may release a pheromone, and another alate may join the first one in the hole. Plugging of the entrance hole with a faecal plug is a sign that the colony has been founded. The pair mate and the female lays a small batch of eggs which develop into nymphs. As the colony expands and the nymphs create galleries, they extract all the water that they need from the wood they eat, and they make small holes to the exterior through which they push their faecal pellets.

In the Sonoran Desert in Arizona, the aridity is so high as to discourage the existence of wood-rotting fungi. Under these conditions, dead woody objects would persist for a very long time, but termites are important to the desert ecosystem, chewing their way through the cellulose litter and creating space for other organisms to grow. M. hubbardi mainly feeds on saguaro skeletons while Pterotermes occidentis, another drywood termite, does the same for Parkinsonia florida, the blue palo verde.
