= Margaret S. Collins =

African-American child prodigy, entomologist

- Collins conducting an experiment.
- Born: Margaret James Strickland Collins; September 4, 1922; Institute, West Virginia, USA
- Died: April 27, 1996 (aged 73); Cayman Islands
- Citizenship: USA
- Education: West Virginia State University; University of Chicago
- Known for: termites; civil rights advocacy
- Scientific career
- Fields: Zoologist, Entomologist
- Workplaces: Florida A&M University; Howard University; Smithsonian's National Museum of Natural History; University of the District of Columbia
- Thesis: Difference in toleration of drying between species of termites (Reticulitermes) (1950)
- Doctoral advisor: Alfred E. Emerson
- Author abbrev. (zoology): Collins

Margaret James Strickland Collins (September 4, 1922 – April 27, 1996) was an African-American child prodigy, entomologist (zoologist) specializing in the study of termites, and passionate civil rights advocate. Collins was nicknamed the "Termite Lady" because of her extensive research on termites. Together with David Nickle, Collins identified a new species of termite called Neotermes luykxi. When Collins earned her PhD., she became the first African-American female entomologist and the third African-American female zoologist.

== Life summary ==
Margaret S. Collins was born in 1922 in Institute, West Virginia. She started college at the age of 14 and graduated with a Bachelor of Science degree in biology from West Virginia State University in 1943. Her Doctor of Philosophy degree was awarded by the University of Chicago in 1950, becoming only the third Black woman zoologist in the country. Her mentor was Alfred E. Emerson. Her dissertation was Difference in toleration of drying between species of termites (Reticulitermes), with an article based on this work in Ecology, the journal of the Ecological Society of America.

Collins taught at Florida A&M University, Howard University, and the University of the District of Columbia. She saw herself primarily as a field scientist, and did extensive field work in North and South America, specializing in the insects of Guyana and Florida. From the late 1970s through 1996, Collins was a research associate in the Smithsonian's National Museum of Natural History, Department of Entomology. Her main area of study was termites of the Caribbean. Her life's research regarding termites included: the evolution of desiccation resistance in termites; various termite species' tolerance of high temperatures; defensive behavior in South American termites, including chemical defenses; termite ecology; species abundance in virgin and disturbed tropical rain forests; and behavioral ecology, taxonomy, and entomology.

She was also an active civil rights advocate, receiving a bomb threat for planning to give a university talk on biology and equality, and being followed by the police and FBI when she was a volunteer driver during a bus boycott. Her activism limited her scientific work for a time: she had been publishing a scientific paper or two a year, but had no publications between 1952 and 1957. She led a 1979 AAAS symposium in Houston, later published as Science and the Question of Human Equality.

Collins was still doing research when she died at age 73 on April 27, 1996, in the Cayman Islands. She died of heart failure, and, as she had hoped to, while on a field trip.

== Early life ==
Margaret S. Collins was born on September 4, 1922, in Institute, West Virginia, the fourth child of Rollins James and Luella Bolling James. Institute was described as an all-Black town and a college town. As a result, there were many educated Black people in Institute, West Virginia. Collins's father, Rollins James, earned his bachelor's degree from West Virginia State University and his master's degree from Tuskegee Institute, both historically Black universities. With these degrees, James worked with George Washington Carver for a while. James then taught Vocational Agriculture at West Virginia State, ran the poultry program at West Virginia State, taught at West Virginia State's laboratory high school, and was a county agent for the UDSA. Collins's mother, Luella James, wanted to become an archaeologist but her studies at West Virginia State were limited because of her gender; she later dropped out of college.

From an early age Collins was fascinated by zoology. Inspired by naturalist Ernest Thompson Seton's books, Two Little Savages and Rolf in the Woods, Collins would explore the woods and barn near her childhood home in order to collect insects. When Collins was just six years old, she was recognized as a child prodigy; as a result of this achievement, she was given access to the book collections at West Virginia State University's Library. Collins's impressive intellect and university level reading skill allowed her to skip two grades and graduate high school early. At 14 years old, Collins graduated from West Virginia State University's Laboratory High School.

== Education ==
After her early graduation from West Virginia State College's Laboratory High School, Collins continued her education until she received a Ph.D. in zoology in 1950. In 1936 Collins started her first year at West Virginia State University, a historically Black university, on an academic scholarship. Collins faced many difficulties as an undergraduate at West Virginia State University due to her gender. She struggled to find a mentor in Biology, which was a male-dominated field. Collins eventually received mentorship from Toye Davis and Frederick Lehner, who were both professors at West Virginia State University. Together Davis and Lehner helped find Collins opportunities in the field of Biology. In 1943, Collins gained her Bachelor of Science degree in biology with minors in Physics and German. Later in 1943 Collins enrolled in the University of Chicago graduating in 1950 with a Ph.D. in zoology. Alfred E. Emerson, a termite expert, mentored Collins at the University of Chicago. Emerson assisted Collins in her studies and shielded her from racism, but he did not let her do fieldwork because he thought women were irritating during scientific expeditions. Emerson helped Collins develop and complete her dissertation, Differences in Toleration of Drying among Species of Termites (Reticulitermes). Collins's dissertation is well regarded in the field of entomology and is cited very often. Collins also wrote an article based on her dissertation in Ecology, the journal of the Ecological Society of America. When Collins received her PhD., she became the third African-American female zoologist and the first African-American female entomologist.

== Career and advocacy for racial equality ==
Collins was employed as an assistant professor at Howard University in Washington, D.C., while her first husband, Bernard Strickland attended Howard University's Medical School. Collins later divorced Strickland and left Howard University because it did not treat its women and men faculty members equally. She started working for Florida A&M University and while there married her second husband Herbert L. Collins. They had two sons. Collins was appointed a full-time professor at Florida A&M, becoming chair of the Biology department in 1953. She often went on collecting trips in Everglades National Park with her family. During her time in Florida, Collins was invited to guest lecture at a local predominantly White university on Biology and equality. The lecture was cancelled due to a bomb threat.

Collins also volunteered to drive people to work during the Florida A&M Student Council's bus boycott. Collins was watched closely by the police and the FBI because of her actions against racial inequality. Collins's advocacy for equal rights limited her scientific work from 1952 to 1957 and she did not publish any papers at this time.

Collins applied for and received a grant from the National Science Foundation to study at the University of Minnesota for a year. From 1961 to 1962, Collins was a research associate at the Minnesota Agricultural Experimental Station in St. Paul where she studied North American termites.

In 1964, Collins moved back to Washington, D.C., and returned to Howard University as a full-time professor. Collins also took a tenured position at Federal City College (now known as University of the District of Columbia) for ten years. Additionally, Collins became president of the Entomological Society of Washington during her time in Washington, D.C., and a research associate at the Smithsonian Institution.

In 1968, with grants from the Smithsonian and the Graduate School of Howard University, Collins led an expedition to Mexico. In 1972 she took a research trip to the Sonoran Desert in Arizona which was supported by the United States IBP Desert Biome Project and the National Science Foundation. In the same year, Collins was invited to the Clark Lectureship at Scripps College; Collins lectured about her research and experiences.

While involved in field research in Guyana, Collins reopened the Alfred Emerson Research Station in 1979. Also, in 1979 Collins orchestrated a symposium for the American Association for the Advancement of Science. The symposium's focus was on Science and the Question of Human Equality. After the symposium she published a book with the same title as the symposium's focus, Science and the Question of Human Equality. The year 1979 was a very busy one for Collins because she also started researching the defense mechanism of termites with Glenn D. Prestwich.

From the late 1970s to 1996, Collins researched termites in the Caribbean through the Smithsonian's National Museum of Natural History, Department of Entomology, especially the termites of Guyana. During these expeditions, Collins informed Guyana's military of ways to build that would avoid termite damage and how to use termite excretions to strengthen building materials. Collins contributed greatly to the Smithsonian's termite collection. The materials she collected were curated as the Collins Collection at the National Museum of Natural History.

== Research and discoveries ==
Collins saw herself primarily as a field scientist and did extensive field work in North and South America, specializing in the insects of Guyana and Florida. With her colleague David Nickle, Collins discovered a new species of termite called Neotermes luykxi, or the Florida damp wood termite, in 1989. This species of termite is native to Florida, Hawaii, Puerto Rico, and the Virgin Islands. In Florida these termites are primarily distributed from eastern Broward County to Key Largo. Collins researched the evolution of desiccation resistance in termites, tolerance to high temperature, and species abundance in virgin and disturbed tropical rain forests. She also researched defense behavior in South American termites, chemical defense of termites, termite ecology, behavioral ecology, taxonomy, and entomology.

== Later years ==
Although she had health problems during the 1980s and the 1990s, Collins increased her work in the field, taking various expeditions to the Caribbean. On April 27, 1996, while on expedition, Collins died at the age of 73 at Southern Cross Club in Little Cayman, Cayman Islands, due to congestive heart failure. .

== Selected published works ==
- Collins, M. S., Wainer, I. W., & Bremner, T. A. (1981). Science and the Question of Human Equality. Boulder, Colo.: Westview Press. ISBN 9780891589525
- Water relations in termites. Chapter in Krishna K, Weesner F (ed). Biology of Termites (1969).
- Collins, M. S. "Jensen's AAAS Fellowship." Science, vol. 196, no. 4292, 1977, pp. 832–832.
