= Neotermes greeni =

Scientific classification
- Kingdom: Animalia
- Phylum: Arthropoda
- Class: Insecta
- Order: Blattodea
- Infraorder: Isoptera
- Family: Kalotermitidae
- Genus: Neotermes
- Species: N. greeni

Binomial name
- Neotermes greeni (Desneux, 1904)

Synonyms
- Calotermes greeni Desneux, 1904

Species of termite

Neotermes greeni, is a species of drywood termite of the genus Neotermes. It is native to India and Sri Lanka. It closely resembles Postelectrotermes militaris. It is a minor pest of tea in Sri Lanka, and major pest of mango in India.

It is confined to upper elevations of the low country and sometimes in mid country.

== Host plants ==
- Albizia saman
- Anacardium occidentale
- Artocarpus heterophyllus
- Camellia sinensis
- Cassia multijuga
- Casuarina equisetifolia
- Crotalaria micans
- Croton laccifer
- Cupressus lindleyi
- Elaeocarpus serratus
- Erythrina subumbrans
- Ficus elastica
- Grevillea robusta
- Hevea brasiliensis
- Ligustrum robustum
- Litsea glutinosa
- Nephelium lappaceum
- Shorea zeylanica
- Spondias mombin
- Toona ciliata
