= Paraneotermes simplicicornis =

Scientific classification
- Domain: Eukaryota
- Kingdom: Animalia
- Phylum: Arthropoda
- Class: Insecta
- Order: Blattodea
- Infraorder: Isoptera
- Family: Kalotermitidae
- Genus: Paraneotermes
- Species: P. simpliconies

Binomial name
- Paraneotermes simpliconies Banks in Banks & Snyder, 1920

Species of termite

Paraneotermes simpliconies is a type of termite, found in the drylands of North America, like the Death Valley. It mostly lives and feeds on rotten and fallen Joshua trees. Its main predators are birds like cactus wren.
