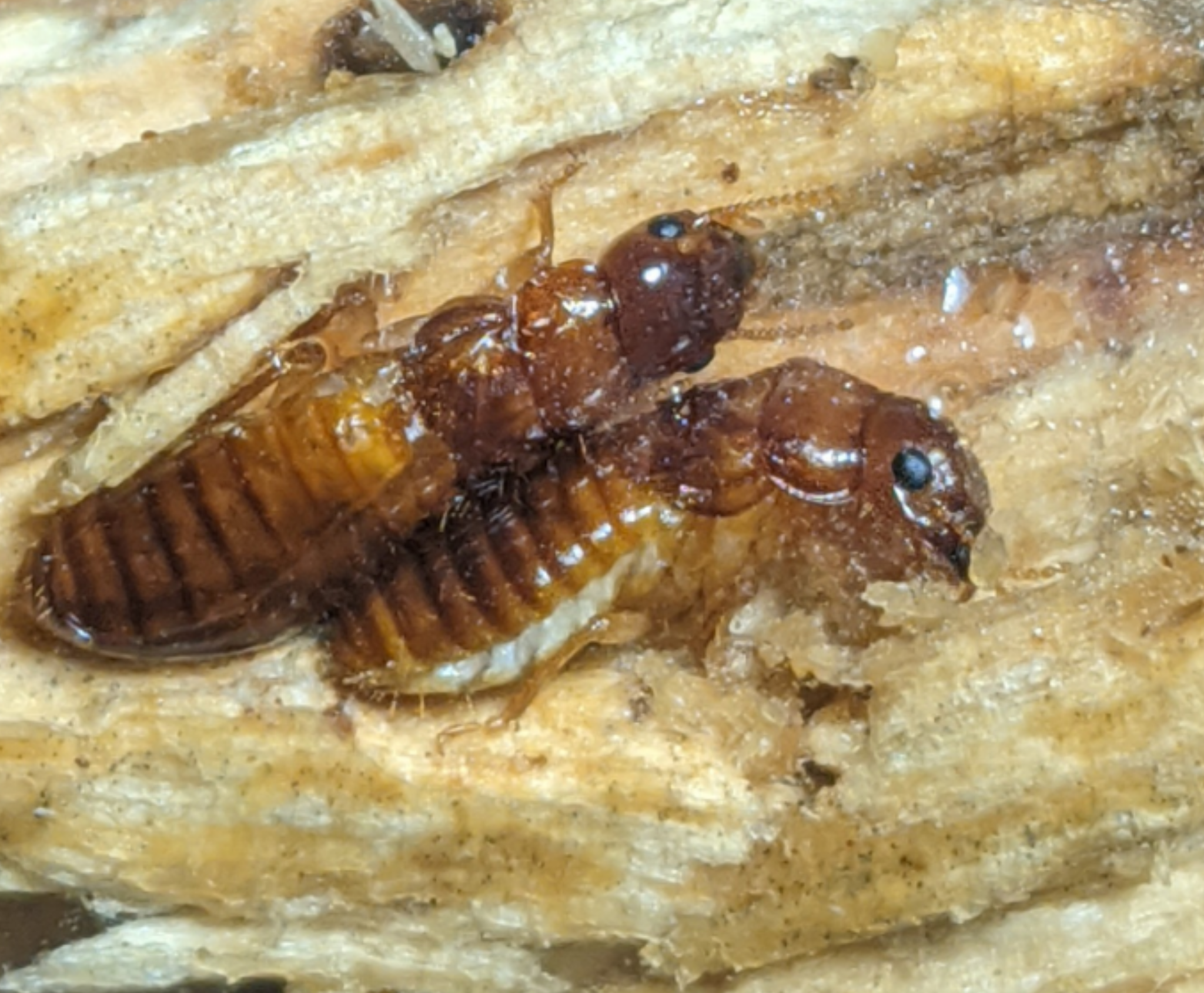
- A pair of N. jouteli imagoes

Scientific classification
- Domain: Eukaryota
- Kingdom: Animalia
- Phylum: Arthropoda
- Class: Insecta
- Order: Blattodea
- Infraorder: Isoptera
- Family: Kalotermitidae
- Genus: Neotermes
- Species: N. jouteli

Binomial name
- Neotermes jouteli (Banks in Banks and Snyder, 1920)

= Neotermes jouteli =

Species of insect

Neotermes jouteli is a species of Neotropical termite in the family Kalotermitidae which is native to South Florida and surrounding West Indian nations. N. jouteli is the largest species of termite in Florida with soldiers reaching a maximum length of 13.35 mm and the winged alates around 16.05 mm.

== Identification ==
The frons (area of head directly above the clypeus) of the imago is deeply depressed with a rugose texture.
