= Neotermes castaneus =

Scientific classification
- Kingdom: Animalia
- Phylum: Arthropoda
- Class: Insecta
- Order: Blattodea
- Infraorder: Isoptera
- Family: Kalotermitidae
- Genus: Neotermes
- Species: N. castaneus

Binomial name
- Neotermes castaneus (Burmeister, 1839)

Species of termite

Neotermes castaneus, known generally as the southern damp-wood termite or Florida dampwood termite, is a species of termite in the family Kalotermitidae. It is found in the Caribbean Sea, Central America, North America, and South America.
