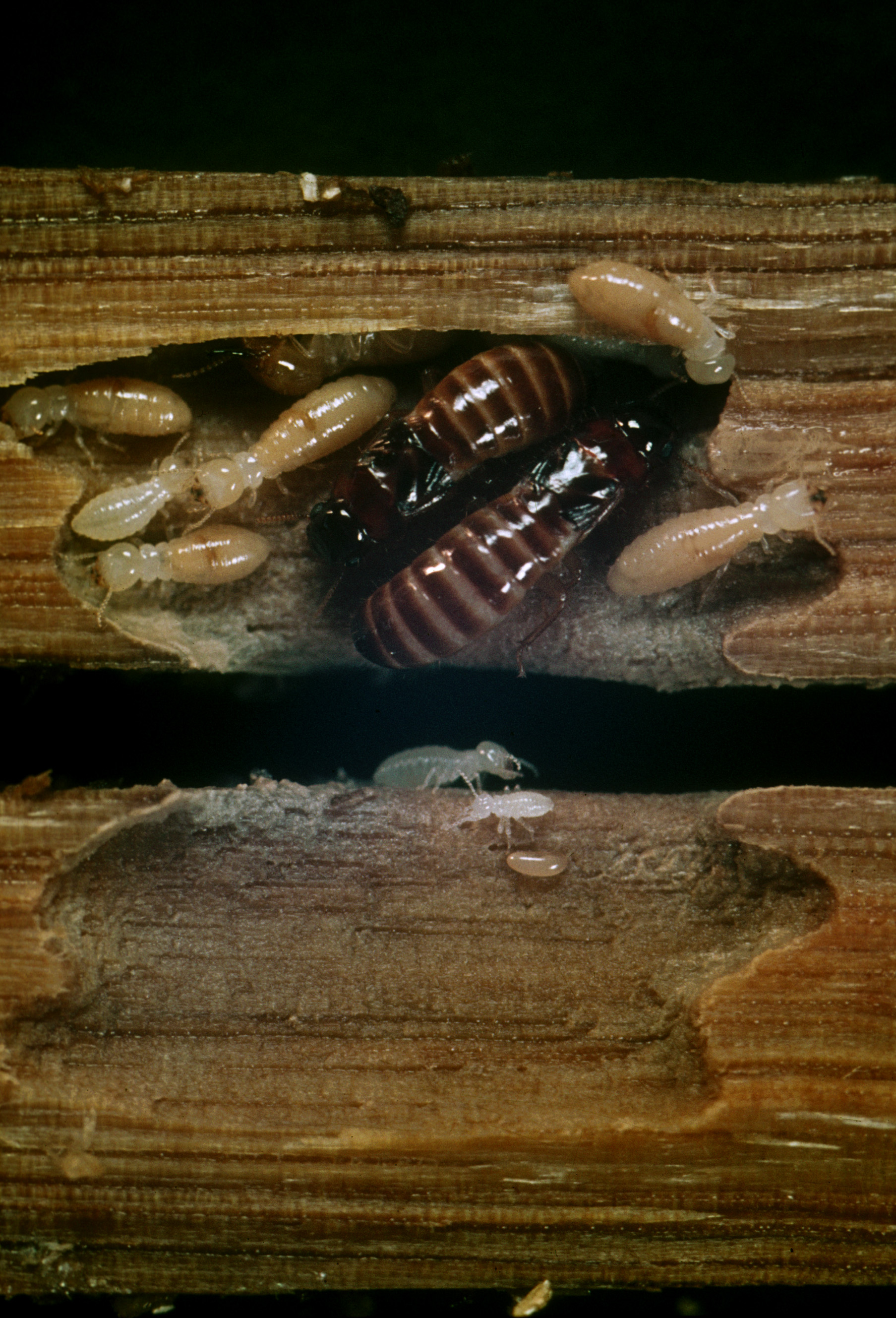

Scientific classification
- Kingdom: Animalia
- Phylum: Arthropoda
- Clade: Pancrustacea
- Class: Insecta
- Order: Blattodea
- Infraorder: Isoptera
- Family: Kalotermitidae
- Genus: Neotermes
- Species: N. insularis

Binomial name
- Neotermes insularis (Walker, 1853)

Synonyms
- Calotermes longiceps Froggatt, 1897; Calotermes malandensis Mjöberg, 1920; Calotermes oculifer Mjöberg, 1920; Calotermes paralleliceps Mjöberg, 1920 Calotermes robustus Froggatt, 1897; Termes insularis Walker, 1853

= Neotermes insularis =

Species of termite

Neotermes insularis (common name: Ringant termite) is a species of termite in the genus Neotermes. It is native to Australia. It was first described by Francis Walker in 1853 as Termes insularis.
