= Neotermes kemneri =

Scientific classification
- Domain: Eukaryota
- Kingdom: Animalia
- Phylum: Arthropoda
- Class: Insecta
- Order: Blattodea
- Infraorder: Isoptera
- Family: Kalotermitidae
- Genus: Neotermes
- Species: N. kemneri

Binomial name
- Neotermes kemneri Roonwal & Sen-Sarma, 1960

Species of termite

Neotermes kemneri, is a species of dry wood termite of the genus Neotermes. It is native to India and Sri Lanka.
