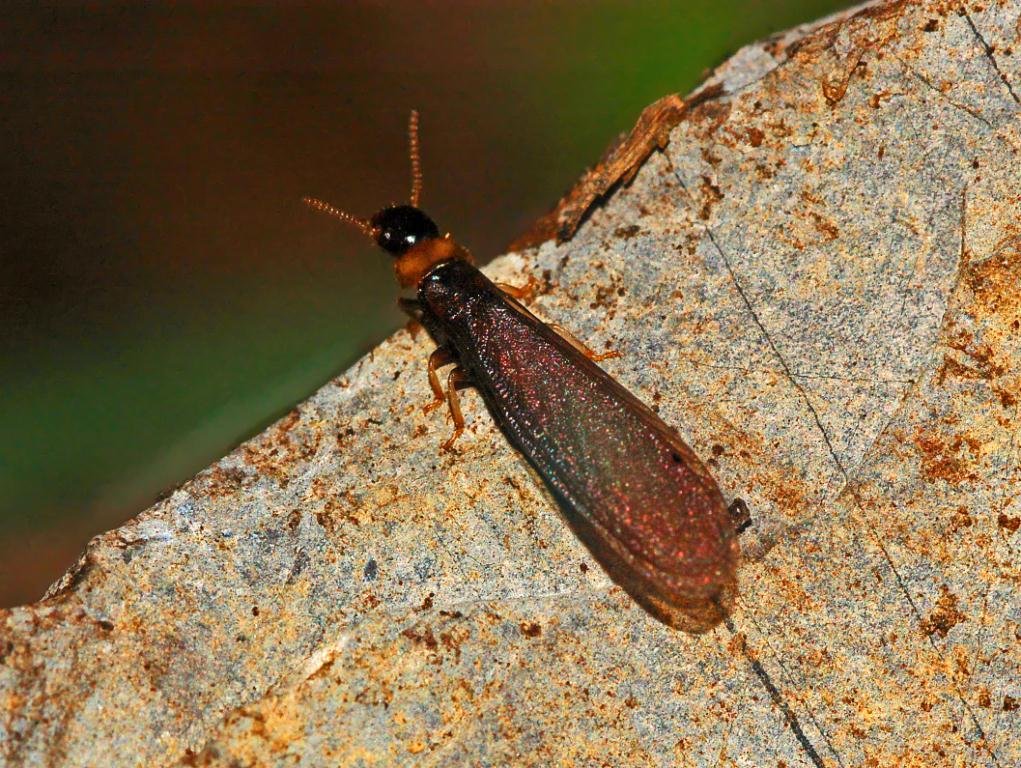
- Kalotermes flavicollis, winged adult

Scientific classification
- Kingdom: Animalia
- Phylum: Arthropoda
- Class: Insecta
- Order: Blattodea
- Infraorder: Isoptera
- Family: Kalotermitidae
- Genus: Kalotermes
- Species: K. flavicollis

Binomial name
- Kalotermes flavicollis (Fabricius, 1793)

Synonyms
- Calotermes flavicollis (Fabricius, 1793)

= Kalotermes flavicollis =

Species of termite

Kalotermes flavicollis, the yellownecked dry-wood termite, is a species of drywood termites belonging to the family Kalotermitidae, one of the most primitive families of termites.

== Distribution ==
This species is mainly present throughout the Mediterranean Basin in Southern Europe, North Africa and the Middle East. It has been introduced to the Azores.

== Description ==
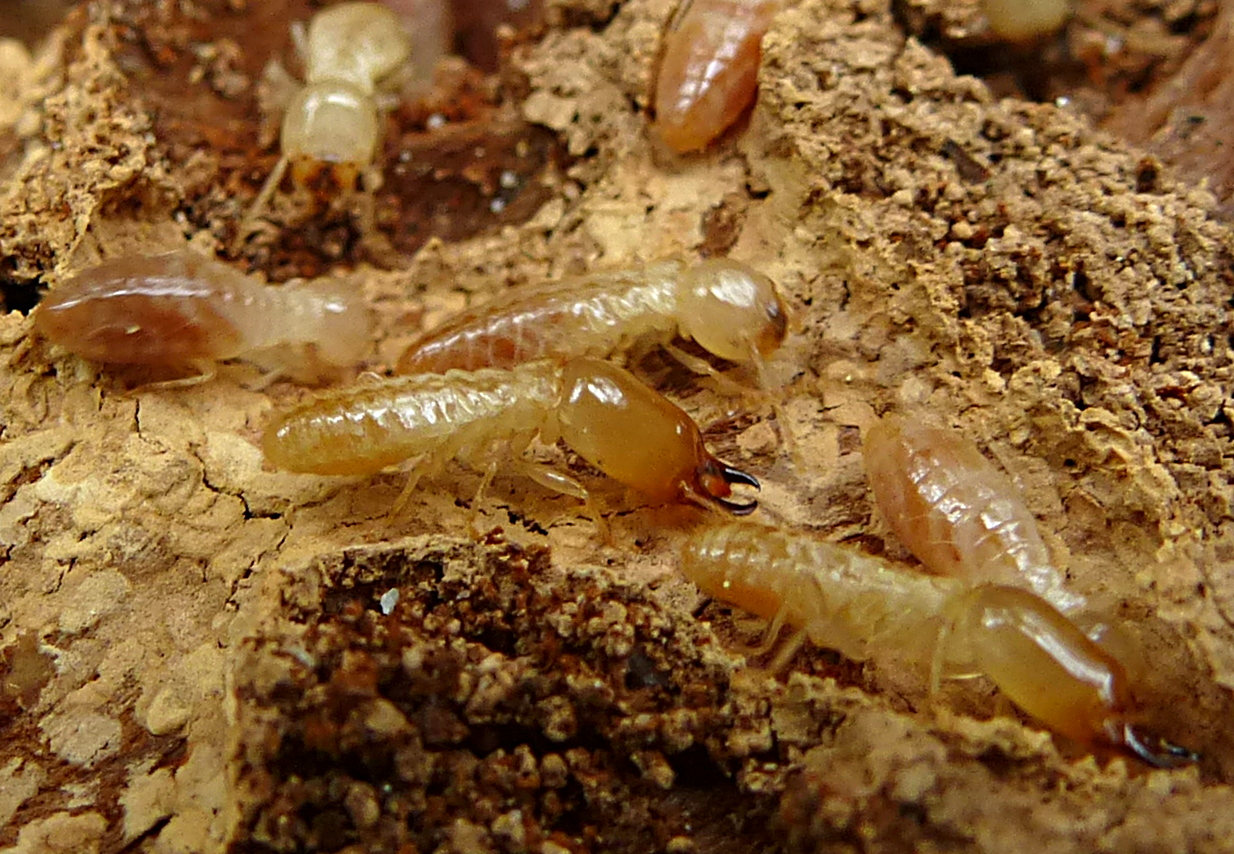
Soldiers and nymphs of a Kalotermes flavicollis colony

There are four castes of these termites, the nymphs (sizes varies from 4 to 6 mm, color is white or creamy), the larvae (translucent and smaller than the nymphs), the soldiers (whitish, with prominent brown heads and strong mandibles, length of about 8 mm) and the breeding adults. Kalotermes flavicollis has no special caste of adult workers since all the tasks in the colony are performed by nymphs.

The adults reach 8–10 millimetres (0.31–0.39 in) of length, with a wingspan of about 20 millimetres (0.79 in). The basic coloration of their body is pale yellow or dark brown. The pronotum is yellow-orange (hence the Latin name flavicollis, meaning 'yellow-necked'), while antennae and distal parts of legs are pale yellow. The male (the king) and the female (the queen) have a more chitinous body, as well two pairs of membranous wings, long, narrow and slightly smoky, essential in the nuptial flight. The wings are held horizontally, overlapping the abdomen when the insect is at rest, so that just one wing is visible. The females are on average a little larger than males.

== Life cycle ==
The nuptial flight of males and females, both fertile and winged, takes place preferably overnight from the middle of July until October, when they swarm to form new colonies. After mating they lose their wings and build a new colony composed of "the royal couple" (king and queen) and approximately 1,000 to 2,000 individuals.

== Habitat ==
This Mediterranean species is mainly encountered close to the sea coast, where temperature are higher. Because termites are xylophagous, their colonies usually are located in the roots or trunks of old trees. They dig tunnels and feed on wood, which can cause the death of infested trees. They also infest beams and roofs of houses, and books in libraries and archives, causing serious damage.
