= Kalotermes jepsoni =

Scientific classification
- Domain: Eukaryota
- Kingdom: Animalia
- Phylum: Arthropoda
- Class: Insecta
- Order: Blattodea
- Infraorder: Isoptera
- Family: Kalotermitidae
- Genus: Kalotermes
- Species: K. jepsoni

Binomial name
- Kalotermes jepsoni Kemner, 1932

Species of termite

Kalotermes jepsoni, is a species of damp wood termite of the genus Kalotermes. It is native to India and Sri Lanka. It usually prefers to live in dead and decaying wood, but sometimes can be seen in live wood. It is a major pest of tea in Sri Lanka.

== Host plants ==
- Cupressus lindleyi
- Shorea zeylanica
- Syzygium gardneri
