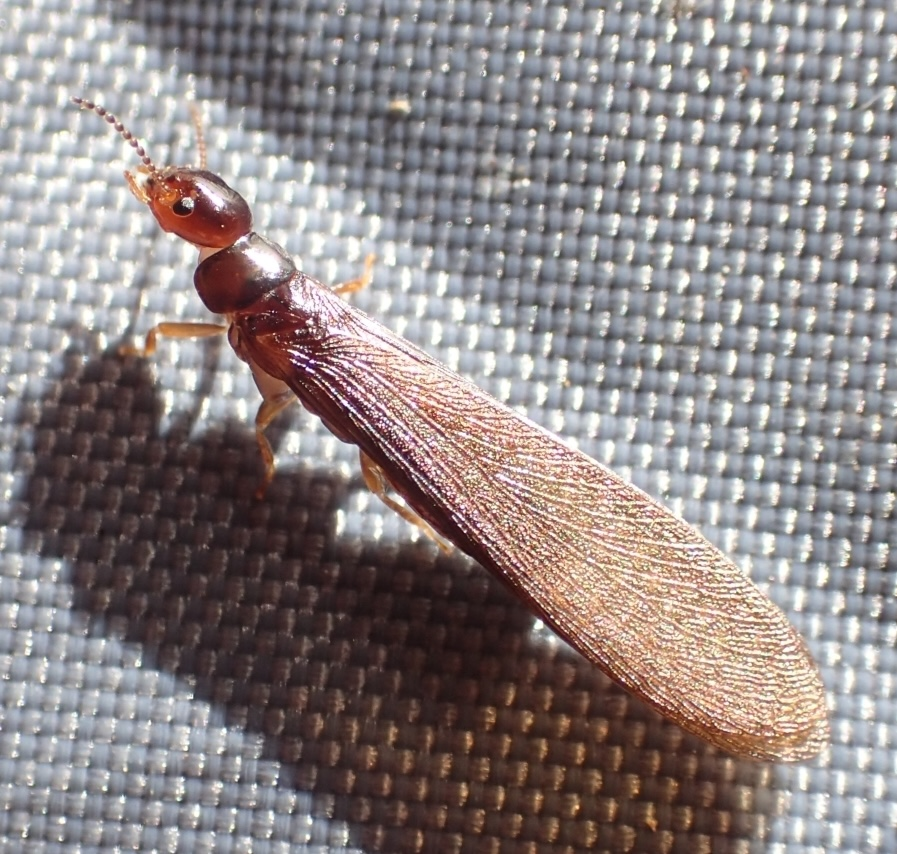

Scientific classification
- Domain: Eukaryota
- Kingdom: Animalia
- Phylum: Arthropoda
- Class: Insecta
- Order: Blattodea
- Infraorder: Isoptera
- Family: Kalotermitidae
- Genus: Kalotermes
- Species: K. brouni

Binomial name
- Kalotermes brouni Froggatt, 1897

Synonyms
- Calotermes brouni Froggatt, 1897

= Kalotermes brouni =

Species of insects

Kalotermes brouni is a species of drywood termite of the genus Kalotermes. It is native to New Zealand, and is the most abundant of New Zealand's three termite species. It is distinguished from introduced Australian termites by its hexagonal droppings.

== Taxonomy and etymology ==
Kalotermes brouni was described by Australian entomologist Walter Wilson Froggatt in 1897 (as Calotermes brouni) based on specimens collected by New Zealand entomologist Thomas Broun from Drury, New Zealand. The species epithet, brouni, honours the collector.

== Phylogeny ==
In a molecular phylogenetic analysis focusing on Australian drywood termites using the standard DNA sequencing markers cytochrome oxidase II (COII) and cytochrome b, K. brouni was found to be nested within the Australian Kalotermes clade.

== Distribution and habitat ==
Kalotermes brouni is endemic to New Zealand and is widespread throughout the country. The species can be found on a number of native and exotic hardwood and softwoods tree hosts. Infestation by K. brouni can damage timber houses, and in extreme cases the house may need to be demolished.

== Gallery ==
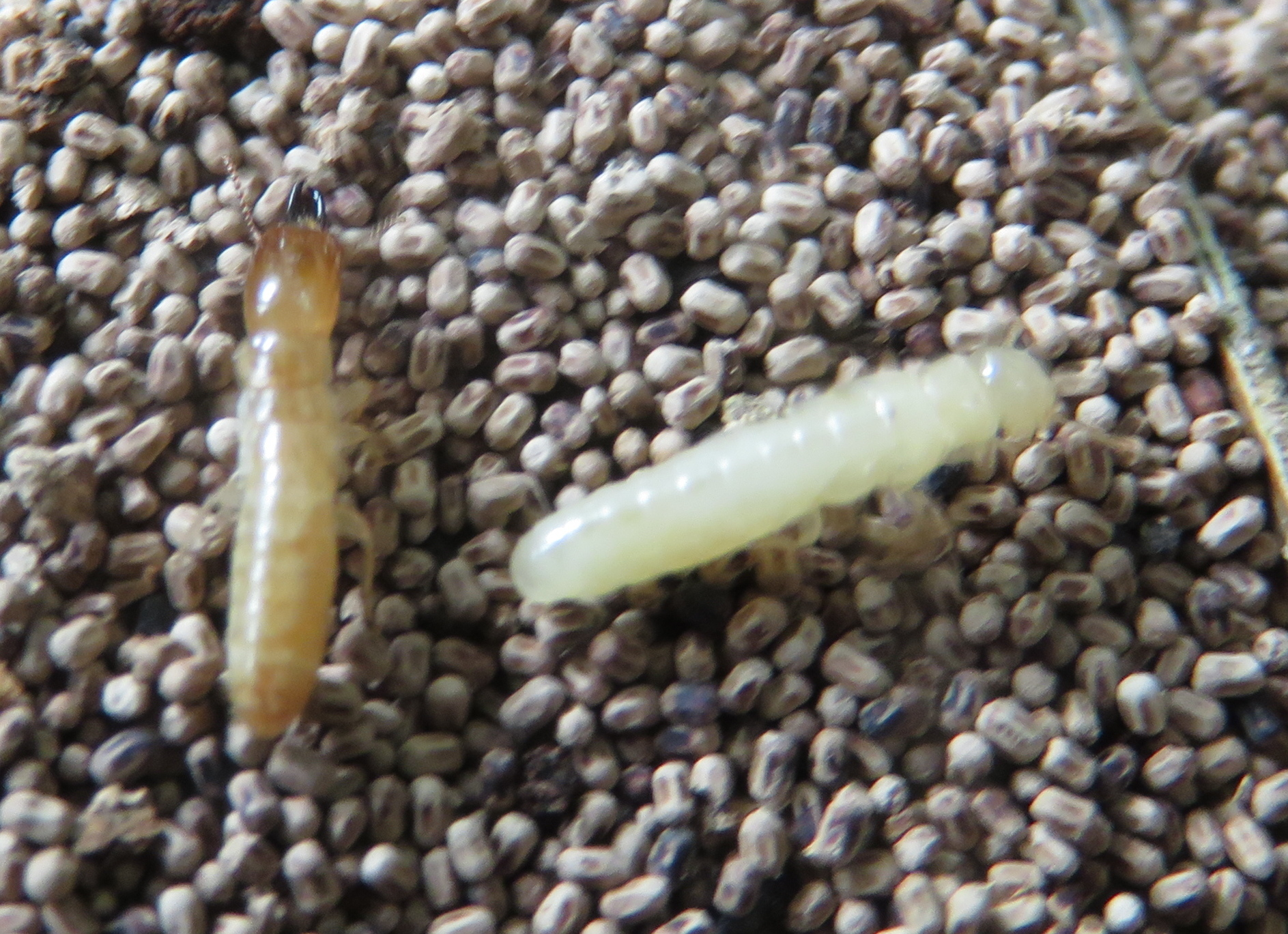
Nymphs

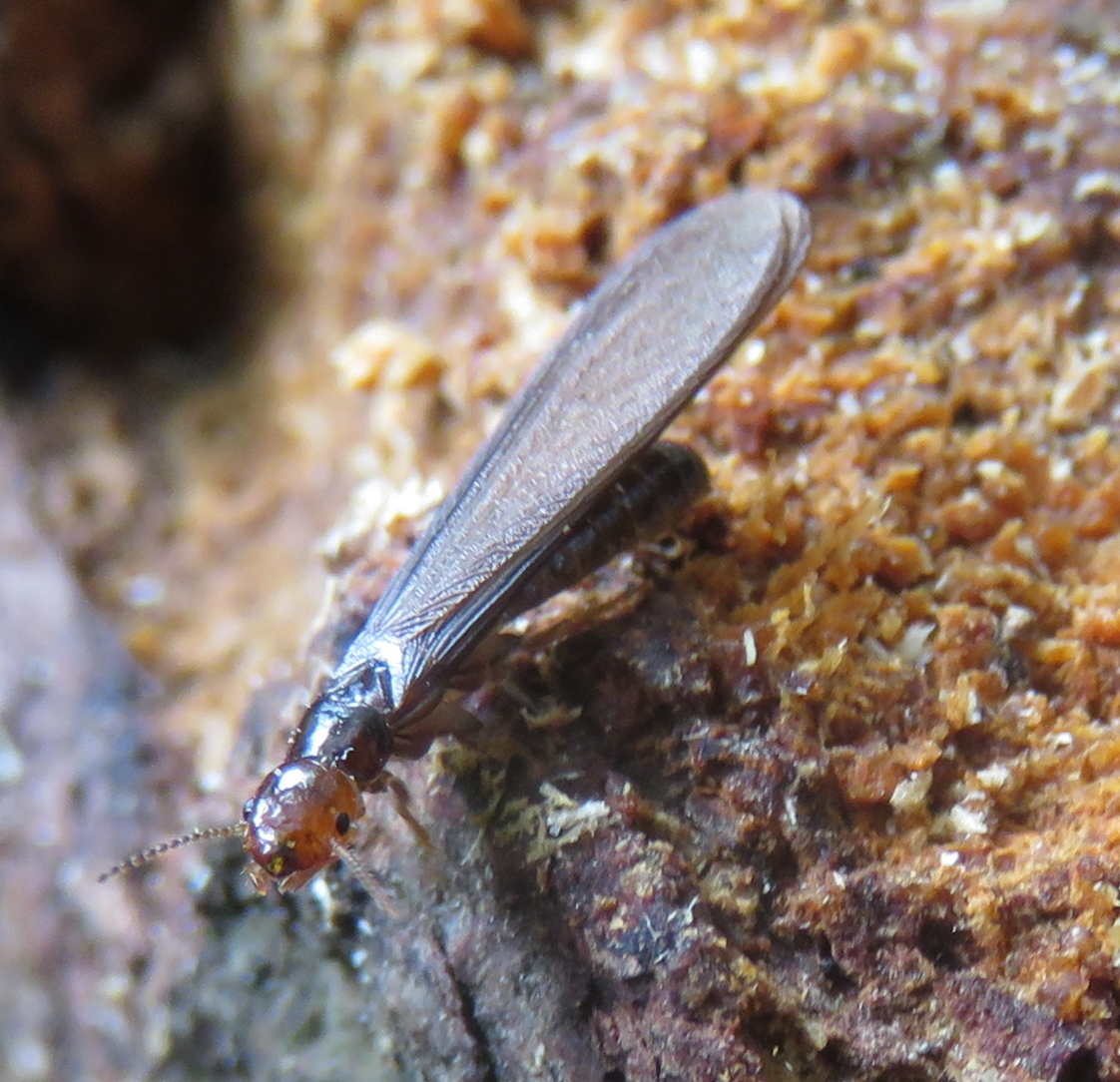
Winged adult
