= Marginitermes =

Scientific classification
- Domain: Eukaryota
- Kingdom: Animalia
- Phylum: Arthropoda
- Class: Insecta
- Order: Blattodea
- Infraorder: Isoptera
- Family: Kalotermitidae
- Genus: Marginitermes; Krishna, 1961

Genus of termites

Marginitermes is a genus of termites in the family Kalotermitidae. There are at least three described species in Marginitermes.

== Species ==
These three species belong to the genus Marginitermes:

- Marginitermes absitus Scheffrahn & Postle, 2013
- Marginitermes cactiphagus Myles, 1997
- Marginitermes hubbardi (Banks in Banks & Snyder, 1920) (light western drywood termite)
