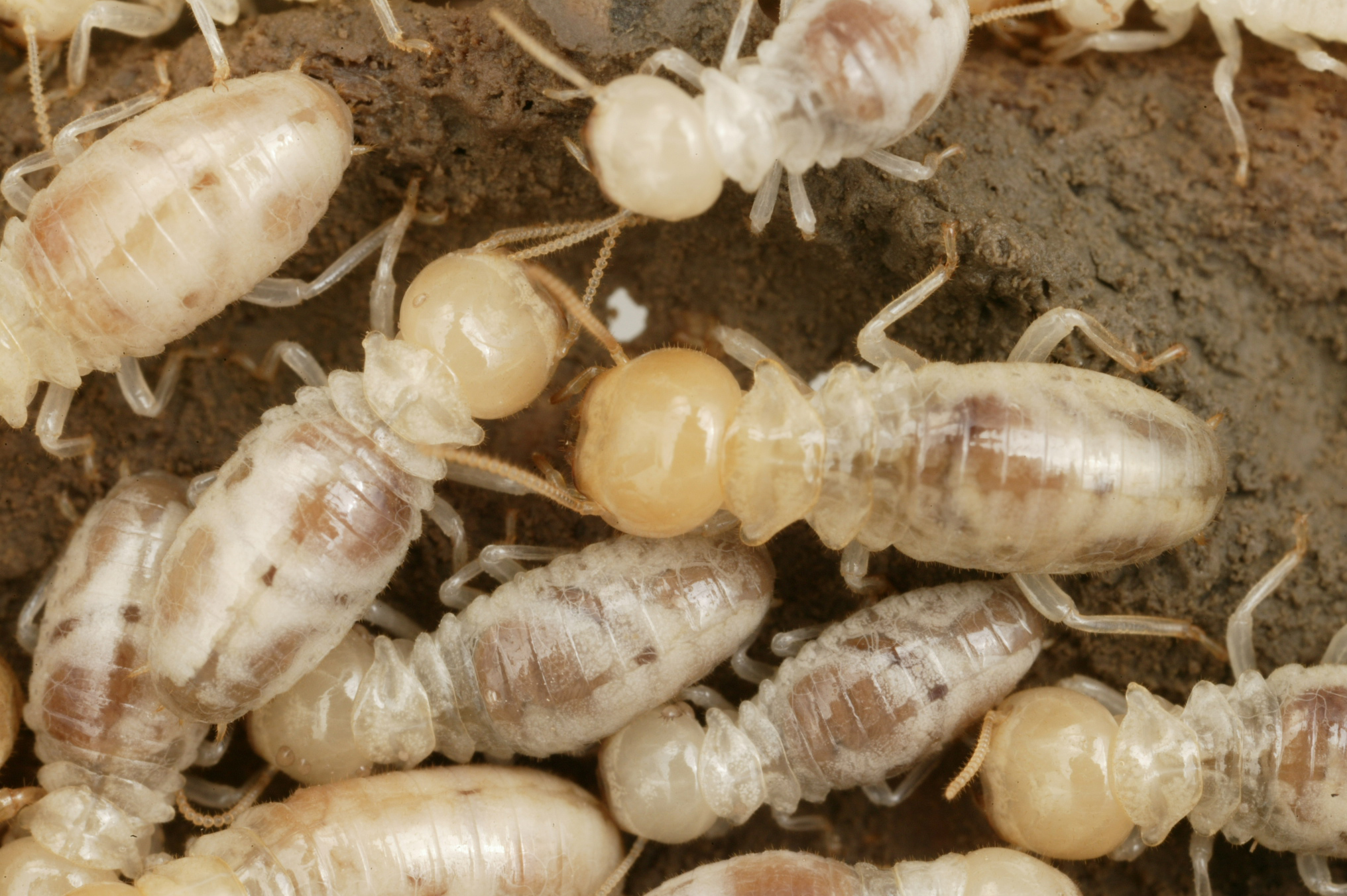
- Mastotermes darwiniensis

Scientific classification
- Kingdom: Animalia
- Phylum: Arthropoda
- Clade: Pancrustacea
- Class: Insecta
- Order: Blattodea
- Infraorder: Isoptera
- Family: Mastotermitidae; Desneux 1904

Genera
- See text

= Mastotermitidae =

Mastotermitidae Temporal range: Hauterivian–Holocene, 129.4–0 Ma

Family of termites

Mastotermitidae is a family of termites with one sole living species, Mastotermes darwiniensis which is found only in northern Australia. The remaining genera of this family are only known from the fossil record.

== Genera ==
Numerous fossil taxa have been described in the Mastotermitidae, as well as in the genus Mastotermes. The family seems to have had a worldwide distribution until just a few million years ago, when all but the ancestors of the giant northern termite became extinct for unknown reasons.

Genera included in the Mastotermitidae are:

1. †Anisotermes Zhao et al Burmese amber, Myanmar, Cenomanian
2. †Blattotermes Riek (Eocene-Oligocene of France, USA, and Australia)
3. †Garmitermes Engel, Grimaldi, & Krishna Baltic amber, Eocene
4. †Idanotermes Engel Baltic amber, Eocene
5. †Khanitermes Engel, Grimaldi, & Krishna Shar-Tolgoy Formation, Dzun-Bain Formation, Mongolia, Aptian
6. †Magnifitermes Jouault, Engel, & Nel Burmese amber, Myanmar, Cenomanian
7. Mastotermes Froggatt (Cretaceous-Recent of Europe, Central America and Australia)
8. †Miotermes Rosen (Miocene of Croatia, Germany, and France)
9. †Spargotermes Emerson (Miocene-Pliocene of Brazil)
10. †Valditermes Jarzembowski Weald Clay, United Kingdom, Hauterivian
