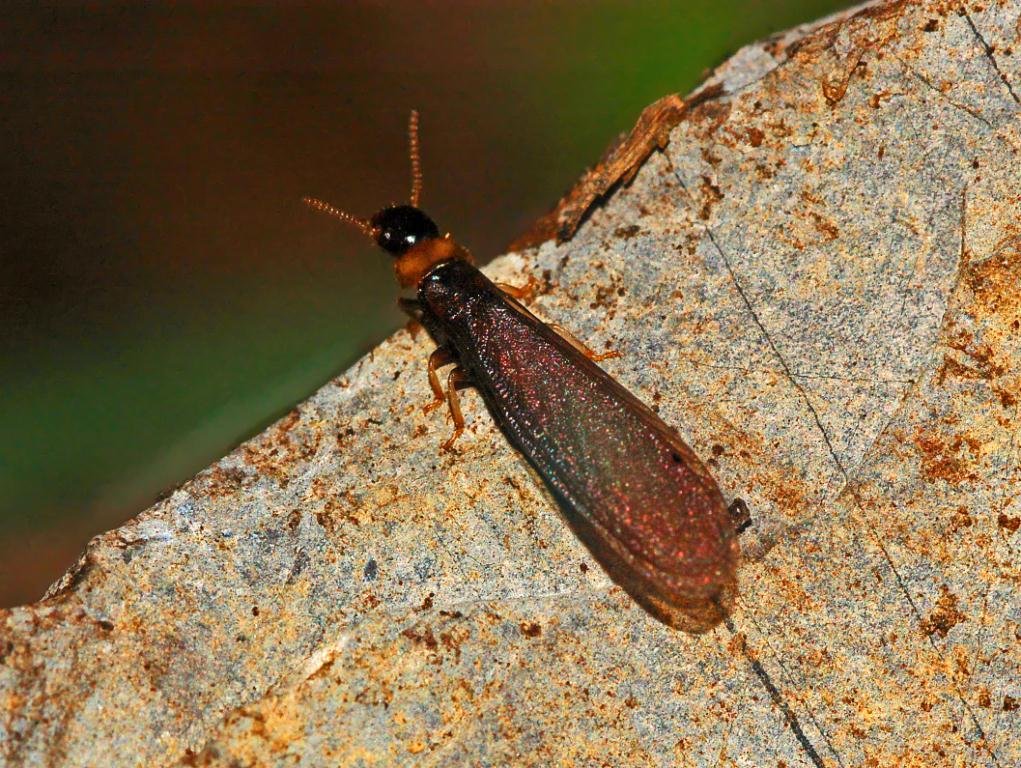
- Kalotermes flavicollis, winged adult

Scientific classification
- Domain: Eukaryota
- Kingdom: Animalia
- Phylum: Arthropoda
- Class: Insecta
- Order: Blattodea
- Infraorder: Isoptera
- Family: Kalotermitidae
- Genus: Kalotermes; Hagen, 1853

Synonyms
- Calotermers Holmgren, 1912; Calotermes Hagen, 1858; Calotermes Holmgren, 1909; Proglyptotermes Emerson

= Kalotermes =

Kalotermess

Genus of termites

Kalotermes is a genus of drywood termites belonging to the family Kalotermitidae, one of the most primitive families of termites.

== List of species ==
The following species are recognised in the genus Kalotermes:

- Kalotermes aemulus Sewell & Gay, 1978
- Kalotermes approximatus Snyder, 1920
- Kalotermes atratus Hill, 1933
- Kalotermes banksiae Hill, 1942
- Kalotermes brouni Froggatt, 1897
- Kalotermes capicola Coaton, 1949
- Kalotermes cognatus Gay, 1976
- Kalotermes convexus (Walker, 1853)
- Kalotermes dispar Grassé, 1938
- Kalotermes disruptus (Cockerell, 1917)
- Kalotermes flavicollis (Fabricius, 1793)
- Kalotermes fossus Zhang, Sun & Zhang, 1994
- Kalotermes gracilignathus Emerson, 1924
- Kalotermes hilli (Emerson, 1949)
- Kalotermes isaloensis (Cachan, 1949)
- Kalotermes jepsoni Kemner, 1932
- Kalotermes marianus Hagen, 1853
- Kalotermes monticola Sjöstedt, 1925
- Kalotermes nigellus Zhang, Sun & Zhang, 1994
- Kalotermes nisus Zhang, Sun & Zhang, 1994
- Kalotermes oeningensis Rosen, 1913
- Kalotermes pallidinotum Hill, 1942
- Kalotermes piacentinii (Piton & Théobald, 1937)
- Kalotermes rhenanus Hagen, 1863
- Kalotermes rufinotum Hill, 1925
- Kalotermes serrulatus Gay, 1977
- Kalotermes sinaicus Kemner, 1932
- Kalotermes umtatae (Coaton, 1949)
- BOLD:ACN5410 (Kalotermes sp.)
