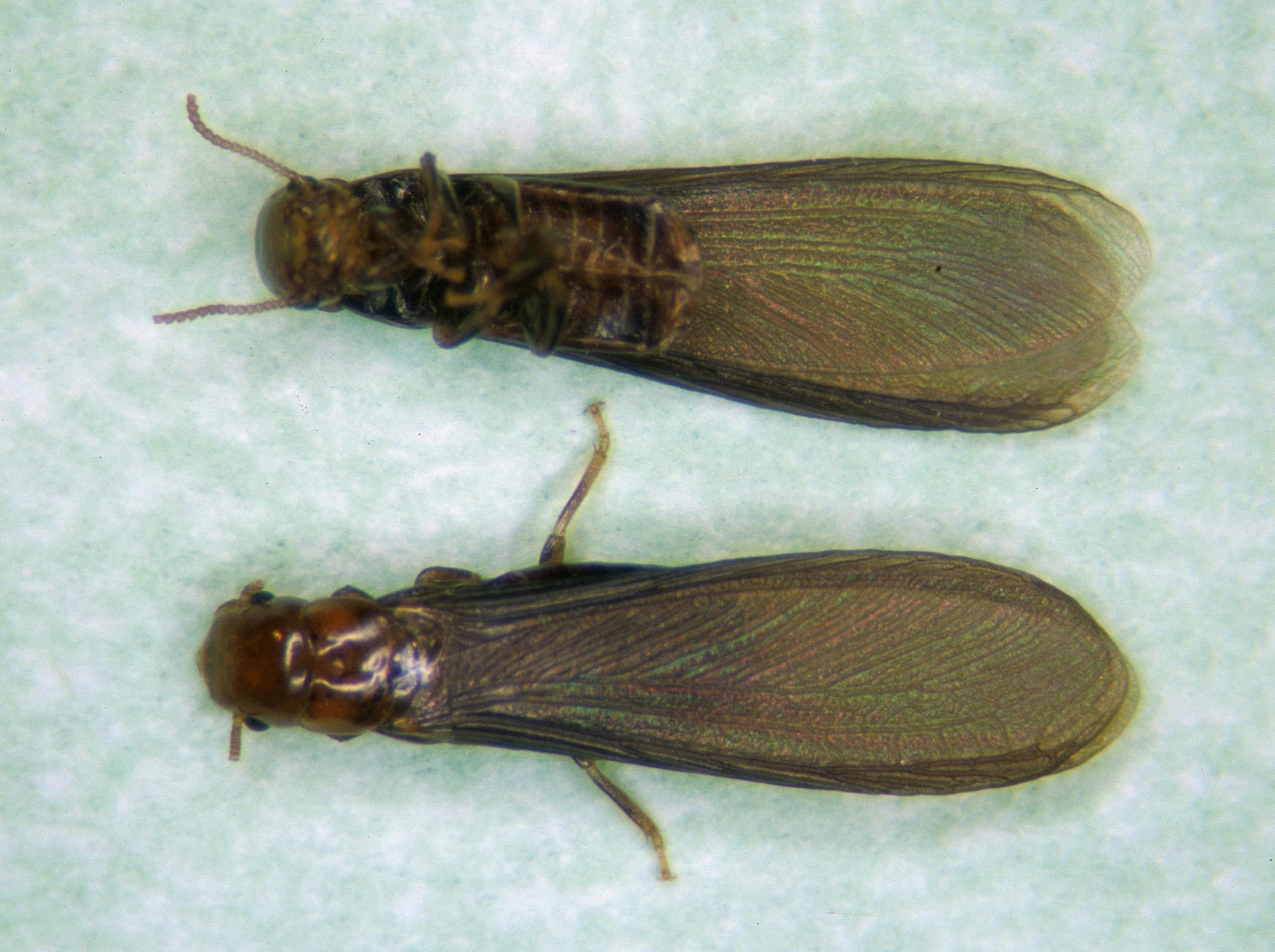
- Incisitermes minor

Scientific classification
- Domain: Eukaryota
- Kingdom: Animalia
- Phylum: Arthropoda
- Class: Insecta
- Order: Blattodea
- Infraorder: Isoptera
- Family: Kalotermitidae
- Genus: Incisitermes; Krishna

Species
- see text

= Incisitermes =

Genus of termites

Incisitermes is a genus of termites in the family Kalotermitidae.

Species include:

- Incisitermes arizonensis (Snyder, 1926)
- Incisitermes banksi (Snyder, 1920)
- Incisitermes barretti (Gay, 1976) - barretti drywood termite
- Incisitermes emersoni (Light, 1933)
- Incisitermes fruticavus (Rust, 1979)
- Incisitermes furvus (Scheffrahn, 1994)
- Incisitermes immigrans (Snyder, 1922) - lowland tree termite
- Incisitermes inamurae (Oshima, 1912)
- Incisitermes marginipennis (Latreille, 1811)
- Incisitermes milleri (Emerson, 1943)
- Incisitermes minor (Hagen, 1858) - western drywood termite
- Incisitermes nigritus (Snyder, 1946)
- Incisitermes perparvus (Light, 1933)
- Incisitermes platycephalus (Light, 1933)
- Incisitermes schwarzi (Banks in Banks and Snyder, 1920)
- Incisitermes seeversi (Snyder and Emerson, 1949)
- Incisitermes snyderi (Light, 1933) - light southeastern drywood termite
