= Pterotermes =

Scientific classification
- Kingdom: Animalia
- Phylum: Arthropoda
- Class: Insecta
- Order: Blattodea
- Infraorder: Isoptera
- Parvorder: Euisoptera
- Family: Kalotermitidae
- Genus: Pterotermes; Holmgren, 1911
- Species: P. occidentis

Binomial name
- Pterotermes occidentis (Walker, 1853)

Synonyms
- Termes occidentis Walker, 1853; Termopsis occidentis Hagen, 1858; Kalotermes occidentis Banks and Snyder, 1920

Genus of termites

Pterotermes is a monotypic genus of termites in the family Kalotermitidae. Pterotermes occidentis is the single species in the genus. This termite lives in the extremely dry conditions found in the Sonoran Desert in southwestern United States, Baja California and Mexico. It feeds on dry wood and lives entirely within a single piece of timber.

== Description ==
Pterotermes occidentis is the largest drywood termite found in the deserts of southwestern USA. It is a primitive species of termite and the castes are indistinct. The eggs hatch into nymphs which grow into "pseudergates", which act as workers before developing into either soldiers or winged reproductives. The winged reproductives have large black compound eyes with white eyespots immediately above. The thorax and abdomen are orange and the pronotum is relatively flat and does not curve downwards at the side. The soldiers have a rounded, flat-topped head, large wingbuds, and a massive pronotum with a V-shaped notch at the front which distinguishes them from other species found in the region. They are also unusual in having prominent eyespots.

== Ecology ==
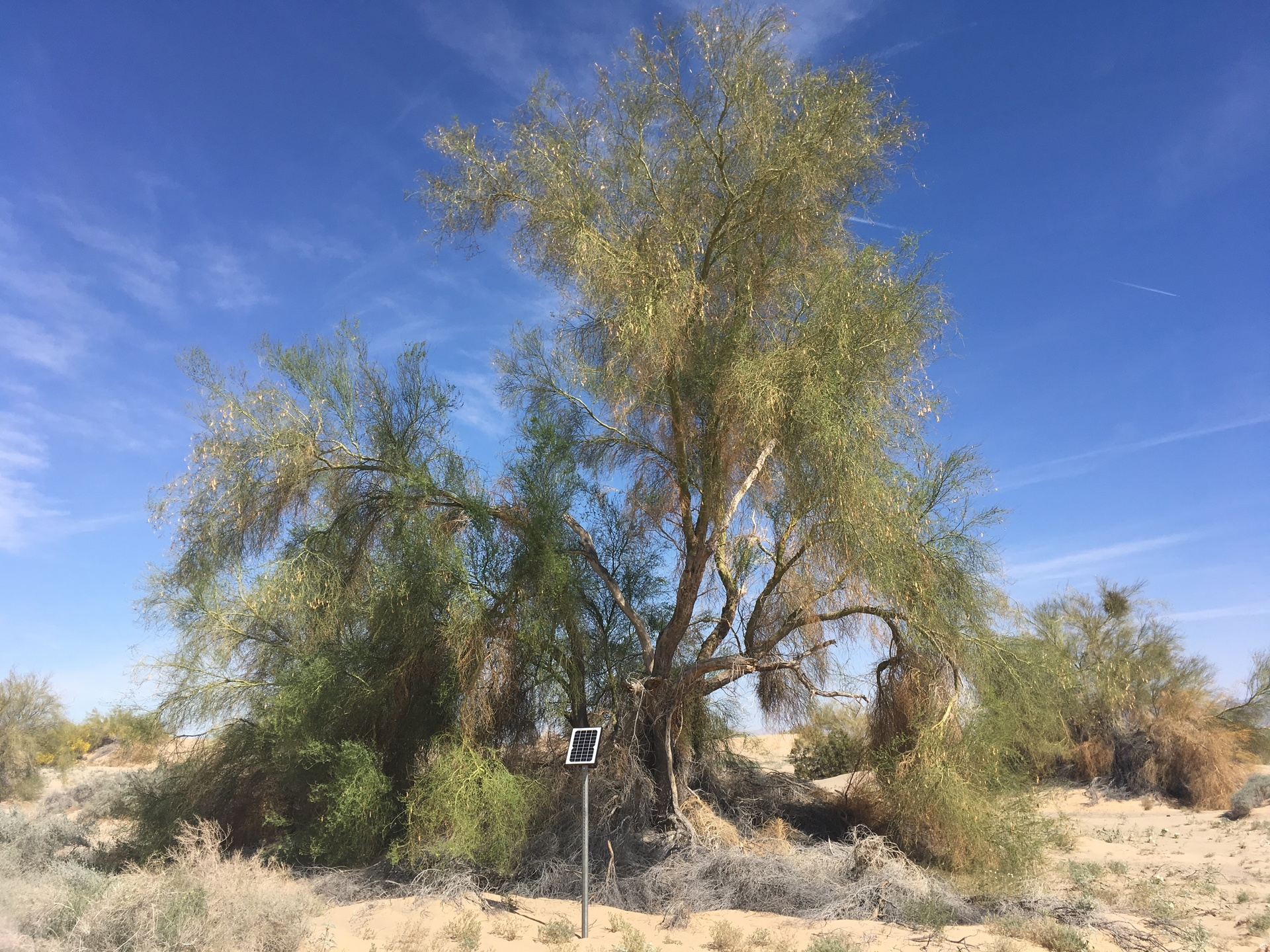
Blue palo verde with dead wood suitable for colonisation

After a mating flight, individual reproductives walk across the substrate, searching for a suitable hole or crevice in dry dead wood. They do not bore a hole, but may enlarge an existing one. They may be later joined in the hole by another individual, and one to three days later, seal the entrance with a faecal plug. colony founding is a very slow process; after the nest has been in existence for a year, their offspring may number somewhere between zero and twelve. The colony expands by the creation of a haphazard collection of galleries. These are generally kept clean, but "kick holes" are made to the exterior in places through which faecal pellets are pushed. The holes are then resealed, and abandoned chambers may be filled with faecal pellets and the desiccated corpses of any colony members that have died. These termites are intolerant of moisture, feed only on dry wood and derive the water they need from their diet. Flights of reproductives occur in July and August.

P. occidentis feeds mainly in dead branches of Parkinsonia florida, the blue palo verde, while Marginitermes hubbardi, another species of drywood termite present in the Sonoran Desert, mainly feeds on the skeletal remains of saguaro. Dry timber being a very difficult food from which to extract nourishment, the termites accumulate an array of about forty symbiotic microorganisms in their gut to help them digest it. All colonies of P. occidentis have this wide range of gut symbionts, suggesting that the diversity is necessary for colony survival.
