= Mithan Lal Roonwal =

Indian zoologist (1908–1990)

- Born: 18 September 1908
- Died: 22 July 1990
- Scientific career
- Fields: zoology
- Institutions: Zoological Survey of India

Mithan Lal Roonwal (18 September 1908 – 22 July 1990) was an Indian zoologist and director of the Zoological Survey of India. Roonwal studied a range of taxa from termites to mammals.

== Education and career ==
Roonwal was born in Jodhpur where he received his early education at Sir Pratap School, Sardar School and Darbar High Schools. He then studied at University of Lucknow where he obtained a Bachelors (1929) and a Master of Science in 1930. He began work at the Locust Research Institute in 1931 at Lyallpur and went to Cambridge where he worked on the embryology of Schistocerca gregaria under the guidance of Augustus Daniel Imms and obtained a Ph.D. in 1935. He was a demonstrator at Cambridge University for a term in 1934 and taught at the Government College Ajmer for a few months in 1935.

He joined the Zoological Survey of India where he worked at the birds and mammals section from 1939 to 1940. Roonwal joined the army during the Second World War and served as a Major in the 15th Punjab Regiment and received a Burma Star for his services. From 1946 he continued his studies on the desert locust and published ideas on predicting the formation of swarms. He joined the Forest Research Institute in 1949 as an entomologist and worked on cataloguing the insect collections held there. He continued working there until 1956 during which time he took an interest in the systematics of termites in which he collaborated with Alfred E. Emerson.

In 1956 he joined the Zoological Survey of India to succeed Sunder Lal Hora as the director. He retired from the ZSI in 1965 and joined Jodhpur University.

== Notable work and recognition ==
His landmark works were on the biology of termites and a monograph on the primates of South Asia. He was the first to note geographic patterns in the shape in which gray langurs (treated in his time as a single species) carried their tails. He described many new species during his career at the Zoological Survey of India.

He received a Sc.D. for his work on the morphology and systematics of termites in 1962 from Cambridge University.
