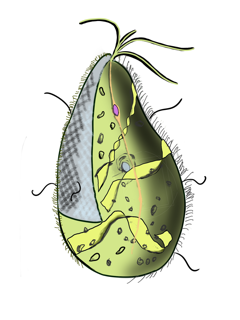

Scientific classification
- Domain: Eukaryota
- Phylum: Metamonada
- Class: Cristamonadea
- Order: Calonymphida
- Family: Mixotrichidae; Boscaro & Keeling 2024
- Genus: Mixotricha; Sutherland 1933
- Species: M. paradoxa

Binomial name
- Mixotricha paradoxa Sutherland 1933

= Mixotricha =

Species of protozoan

Mixotricha paradoxa is a species of protozoan that lives inside the gut of the Australian termite species Mastotermes darwiniensis.

It is composed of five different organisms: three bacterial ectosymbionts live on its surface for locomotion and at least one endosymbiont lives inside to help digest cellulose in wood to produce acetate for its host(s).

Mixotricha mitochondria degenerated into hydrogenosomes and mitosomes and lost the ability to produce energy aerobically by oxidative phosphorylation. The mitochondria-derived nuclear genes were however conserved.

== Discovery ==
The name was given by the Australian biologist J.L. Sutherland, who first described Mixotricha in 1933. The name means "the paradoxical being with mixed-up hairs" because this protist has both cilia and flagella, which was not thought to be possible for protists.

== Behavior ==
Mixotricha is a species of protozoan that lives inside the gut of the Australian termite species Mastotermes darwiniensis and has multiple bacterial symbionts.

Mixotricha is a large protozoan .5 millimetres (0.020 in) long and contains hundreds of thousands of bacteria. It is an endosymbiont and digests cellulose for the termite.

Trichomonads like Mixotricha reproduce by a special form of longitudinal fission, leading to large numbers of trophozoites in a relatively short time. Cysts never form, so transmission from one host to another is always based on direct contact between the sites they occupy.

== Anatomy ==
Species of the order Trichomonadida typically have four to six flagella at the cell's apical pole, one of which is recurrent - that is, it runs along a surface wave, giving the aspect of an undulating membrane. Mixotricha paradoxa have four weak flagella that serve as rudders. It has four large flagella at the front end, three pointing forwards and one backward.

The basal bodies are also bacteria, not spirochaetes but oval, pill-shaped bacteria. There is a one-to-one relationship between a bracket, a spirochaete, and a basal bacterium. Each bracket has one spirochaete running through it and one pill bacterium at its base as the basal body. It has not been shown definitely, but the basal bodies could also be making cellulases that digest wood.

== Endosymbionts for biochemical processes ==
At least one endosymbiont lives inside the protist to help digest cellulose and lignin, a major component of the wood the termites eat. The cellulose gets converted to glucose then to acetate, and the lignin is digested directly to acetate. The acetate probably crosses the termite gut membrane to be digested later.

Mixotricha forms a mutualistic relationship with bacteria living inside the termite. There are a total of four species of bacterial symbionts. It has spherical bacteria inside the cell, which function as mitochondria, which Mixotricha lacks. Mixotricha mitochondria degenerated and lost the ability to produce energy aerobically by oxidative phosphorylation. Mitochondrial relics include hydrogenosomes which produce hydrogen and small structures called mitosomes.

== Ectosymbionts for movement ==
Three surface colonising bacteria are anchored on the surface.

The flagella and cilia are actually two different single celled organisms. The ciliate belongs to an archaic group that used to be called archezoa but this term is no longer in fashion. It has four weak flagella, which serve as a rudder.

While Mixotricha has four anterior flagella, it does not use them for locomotion, but more for steering. For locomotion, about 250,000 hairlike Treponema spirochaetes, a species of helical bacteria, are attached to the cell surface and provide the cell with cilia-like movements.

The wavelength of the cilia is about .1 millimetres (0.0039 in) and suggests that the spirochaetes are somehow in touch with each other.

Mixotricha also has rod-shaped bacteria arranged in an ordered pattern on the surface of the cell.

Each spirochaete has its own little emplacement, called a 'bracket'. Spirochetes move continuously forwards or backwards but when they are attached they move in one direction.

Sperm tails might have their origin in spirochaetes. The evidence that cilia (undulipodia) are symbiotic bacteria is found unpersuasive.

== Genome ==
Mixotricha have five genomes, as they form very close symbiotic relationships with four types of bacteria. It is a good example organism for symbiogenesis and nestedness.

There are two spirochete and one-rod bacteria on its surface, one endosymbiotic bacteria inside to digest cellulose and the host nucleus.
