= Calcaritermes =

Scientific classification
- Domain: Eukaryota
- Kingdom: Animalia
- Phylum: Arthropoda
- Class: Insecta
- Order: Blattodea
- Infraorder: Isoptera
- Family: Kalotermitidae
- Genus: Calcaritermes

Species
- see text

Genus of termites

Calcaritermes is a genus of termites in the Kalotermitidae family.

== Species ==
- Calcaritermes colei Krishna, 1962
- Calcaritermes nearcticus (Snyder, 1933)
- Calcaritermes parvinotus (Light, 1933)
