= Kumar Krishna =

American entomologist

Kumar Krishna (21 June 1928-19 September 2014) was an American entomologist of Indian origin. He was an expert on the termites and published the definitive systematic treatment of the termites of the world in a seven volume Treatise on the Isoptera of the world in 2013 written with collaborators.

Kumar was born in Rangoon and grew up in Dehra Dun where his father lived as an army physician who had served as a major in World War I. Kumar studied at the Agra University, receiving a Bachelor of Science in 1950 followed by a Master's degree from the University of Lucknow in 1952. He worked as a research assistant at the Forest Research Institute to Mithan Lal Roonwal, a specialist on termites and became very interested in the group. He moved to the University of Minnesota in 1954 and then moved to the University of Chicago to pursue a Ph.D. under Alfred E. Emerson (1896–1976). His research was on the dry wood termites in the family Kalotermitidae. He then worked at the City College of the City University of New York from 1962 while also being a research associate at the American Museum of Natural History. He became an assistant professor in 1964 and a full professor in 1973.

Along with F.M. Weesner he published a two volume work on the Biology of Termites in 1970. After retiring from college in 1996 he began to work on the termites of the world which was published on April 25, 2013 in seven volumes consisting of 2704 pages. His collection of termites from around the world is the most comprehensive one and is now part of the AMNH. Nearly 14 insect taxa are named after him. He was invited to write the entry on termites in the 15th edition of Encyclopedia Britannica.

Kumar met Valerie Smith at the University of Chicago and the two got married. Valerie was a professor of English working alongside Kumar at the City College and helped him produce the Treatise. He took an interest in classical music. He died from multiple cancers at his home in Manhattan.
