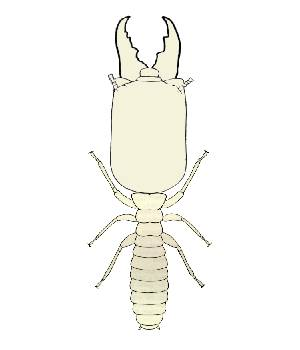
- Neotermes insularis

Scientific classification
- Kingdom: Animalia
- Phylum: Arthropoda
- Class: Insecta
- Order: Blattodea
- Infraorder: Isoptera
- Family: Kalotermitidae
- Genus: Neotermes; Holmgren, 1911

Type species
- Neotermes castaneus (Burmeister, 1839)

Species
- see text

= Neotermes =

Genus of termites

Neotermes is a genus of termites in the Kalotermitidae family. The genus was first described by Nils Holmgren in 1911 (as a subgenus), and the type species is Neotermes castaneus. All species are obligate nesters of wood.

== Species ==
GBIF lists the following species:

- Neotermes aburiensis Sjöstedt, 1926
- Neotermes acceptus Mathews, 1977
- Neotermes adampurensis Akhtar, 1975
- Neotermes agilis (Sjöstedt, 1902)
- Neotermes amplilabralis Han & Xu, 1985
- Neotermes andamanensis (Snyder, 1933)
- Neotermes angustigulus Han, 1984
- Neotermes araguaensis Snyder, 1959
- Neotermes aridus Wilkinson, 1959
- Neotermes arthurimuelleri (Rosen, 1912)
- Neotermes artocarpi (Haviland, 1898)
- Neotermes assamensis Saha & Maiti, 2000
- Neotermes assmuthi (Holmgren, 1913)
- Neotermes binovatus Han, 1984
- Neotermes blairi Chakraborty & Maiti, 1994
- Neotermes bosei (Snyder, 1933)
- Neotermes brachynotum Han & Xu, 1985
- Neotermes brevinotus (Snyder, 1932)
- Neotermes buxensis Sen-Sarma & Roonwal, 1960
- Neotermes camerunensis (Sjöstedt, 1900)
- Neotermes castaneus (Burmeister, 1839)
- Neotermes chilensis (Blanchard, 1851)
- Neotermes collarti Coaton, 1955
- Neotermes connexus Snyder, 1922
- Neotermes costaseca Scheffrahn, 2018
- Neotermes cryptops (Sjöstedt, 1900)
- Neotermes cubanus (Snyder, 1922)
- Neotermes dalbergiae (Kalshoven, 1930)
- Neotermes desneuxi (Sjöstedt, 1904)
- Neotermes dhirendrai Bose, 1984
- Neotermes dolichognathus Han & Xu, 1985
- Neotermes dubiocalcaratus Han, 1984
- Neotermes eleanorae Bose, 1984
- Neotermes erythraeus Silvestri, 1918
- Neotermes europae (Wasmann, 1910)
- Neotermes ferrugineus (Holmgren, 1911)
- Neotermes firmus (Sjöstedt, 1911)
- Neotermes fletcheri (Holmgren & Holmgren, 1917)
- Neotermes fovefrons Han & Xu, 1985
- Neotermes fujianensis Ping, 1983
- Neotermes fulvescens (Silvestri, 1901)
- Neotermes gestri Silvestri, 1912
- Neotermes glabriusculus Oliveira, 1979
- Neotermes gnathoferrum Grimaldi, Lal & Ware, 2010
- Neotermes gracilidens Sjöstedt, 1925
- Neotermes grandis Light, 1930
- Neotermes grassei Piton, 1940
- Neotermes greeni (Desneux, 1908)
- Neotermes hirtellus (Silvestri, 1901)
- Neotermes holmgreni Banks, 1918
- Neotermes humilis Han, 1984
- Neotermes insularis (Walker, 1853)
- Neotermes intracaulis Křeček & Scheffrahn, 2003
- Neotermes jouteli (Banks, 1919)
- Neotermes kalimpongensis Maiti, 1975
- Neotermes kanehirai (Oshima, 1917)
- Neotermes kartaboensis (Emerson, 1925)
- Neotermes kemneri Sen-Sarma & Roonwal, 1960
- Neotermes keralai Verma & Roonwal, 1972
- Neotermes ketelensis Kemner, 1932
- Neotermes koshunensis (Shiraki, 1909)
- Neotermes krishnai (Maiti & Chakraborty, 1981)
- Neotermes lagunensis (Oshima, 1920)
- Neotermes larseni (Light, 1935)
- Neotermes laticollis (Holmgren, 1910)
- Neotermes lepersonneae Coaton, 1955
- Neotermes longiceps (Cachan, 1949)
- Neotermes longipennis Kemner, 1930
- Neotermes luykxi Collins & Nickle, 1989
- Neotermes magnoculus (Snyder, 1926)
- Neotermes malatensis (Oshima, 1917)
- Neotermes mangiferae Sen-Sarma & Roonwal, 1960
- Neotermes medius Oshima, 1923
- Neotermes megaoculatus Sen-Sarma & Roonwal, 1960
- Neotermes meruensis (Sjöstedt, 1907)
- Neotermes microculatus Sen-Sarma & Roonwal, 1960
- Neotermes microphthalmus Light, 1930
- Neotermes minutus Kemner, 1932
- Neotermes miracapitalis Han & Xu, 1985
- Neotermes modestus (Silvestri, 1901)
- Neotermes mona (Banks, 1919)
- Neotermes nigeriensis (Sjöstedt, 1911)
- Neotermes nilamburensis Thakur, 1978
- Neotermes ovatus Kemner, 1931
- Neotermes pallidicollis (Sjöstedt, 1902)
- Neotermes papua (Desneux, 1905)
- Neotermes paraensis (Costa Lima, 1942)
- Neotermes paratensis Thakur & Sen-Sarma, 1975
- Neotermes parviscutatus Light, 1930
- Neotermes phragmosus Scheffrahn & Křeček, 2003
- Neotermes pingshanensis Peng & Tan, 2009
- Neotermes platyfrons Scheffrahn & Křeček, 2001
- Neotermes prosonneratiae Akhtar, 1975
- Neotermes rainbowi (Hill, 1926)
- Neotermes reunionensis Paulian, 1957
- Neotermes rhizophorae Chakraborty & Maiti, 1994
- Neotermes rouxi (Holmgren & Holmgren, 1915)
- Neotermes saleierensis Kemner, 1932
- Neotermes samoanus (Holmgren, 1912)
- Neotermes sanctaecrucis (Snyder, 1925)
- Neotermes sarasini (Holmgren & Holmgren, 1915)
- Neotermes schultzei (Holmgren, 1911)
- Neotermes sepulvillus (Emerson, 1928)
- Neotermes setifer Snyder, 1957
- Neotermes shimogensis Thakur, 1975
- Neotermes sinensis (Light, 1924)
- Neotermes sjostedti (Desneux, 1908)
- Neotermes sonneratiae Kemner, 1932
- Neotermes sphenocephalus Han & Xu, 1985
- Neotermes sugioi Yashiro, Takematsu, Ogawa & Matsuura, 2019
- Neotermes superans Silvestri, 1928
- Neotermes taishanensis Han & Xu, 1985
- Neotermes tectonae (Dammerman, 1916)
- Neotermes tuberogulus Han & Xu, 1985
- Neotermes undulatus Han & Xu, 1985
- Neotermes venkateshwara Bose, 1984
- Neotermes voeltzkowi (Wasmann, 1897)
- Neotermes wagneri (Desneux, 1904)
- Neotermes yunnanensis Han & Xu, 1985
- Neotermes zanclus Oliveira, 1979
- Neotermes zuluensis (Holmgren, 1913)
