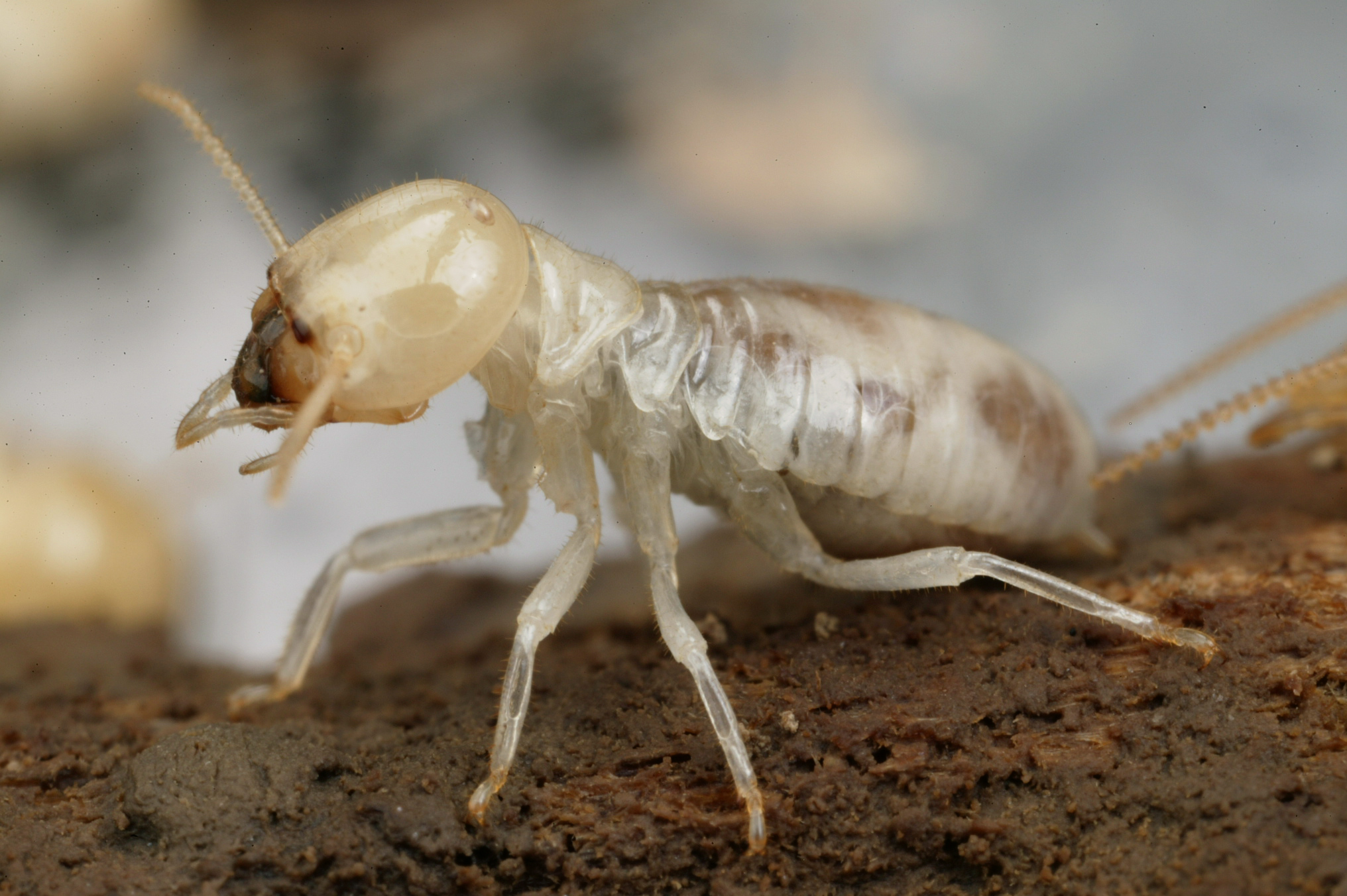

Scientific classification
- Kingdom: Animalia
- Phylum: Arthropoda
- Clade: Pancrustacea
- Class: Insecta
- Order: Blattodea
- Infraorder: Isoptera
- Family: Mastotermitidae
- Genus: Mastotermes
- Species: M. darwiniensis

Binomial name
- Mastotermes darwiniensis Froggatt, 1897

= Mastotermes darwiniensis =

Species of termite

Mastotermes darwiniensis, common names giant northern termite and Darwin termite, is a termite species found only in northern Australia. It is the most primitive extant termite species. Contrary to common belief, this species does not form mounds as the nests are subterranean and inconspicuous. Colonies will readily occupy and infest decomposing wood but primarily live in a complex subterranean network of tunnels and galleries which they use to travel to new food sites. Colonies may eventually split and form isolated satellite colonies.

== Evolutionary significance ==
This species shows uncanny similarities to certain cockroaches, the termites' closest relatives. These similarities include the anal lobe of the wing and the laying of eggs in bunches, rather than singly. It is the only living member of its genus Mastotermes and its family Mastotermitidae, though numerous fossil taxa are known. The termites were traditionally placed in the Exopterygota, but such an indiscriminate treatment makes that group a paraphyletic grade of basal neopterans. Thus, the cockroaches, termites, and their relatives are nowadays placed in a clade called the Dictyoptera. These singular termites appear at first glance like a cockroach's abdomen stuck to a termite's fore part. Their wings have the same form as those of the roaches, and its eggs are laid in a case as are roach eggs. It is thought to have evolved from the same ancestors as the wood roaches (Cryptocercus) in the Late Jurassic or Early Cretaceous.

== Biology ==
Unlike cockroaches, only the reproductives have wings (see Life cycle of termites); wings that are considerably longer than their abdomen. Alates are approximately 35 mm long with a 50 mm wingspan. Soldiers are 11–13 mm long and workers are 10–11.5 mm long. The soldiers have an alarm defense system which warns nest-mates within the colony of potential dangers. Two ways they communicate these dangers is through pheromones secreted in its labial glands, and by creating vibrations through movements.

Mastotermes darwiniensis is usually not very numerous, nor are the colonies large when left to natural conditions. However, when given abundant water (such as regular irrigation) and favourable food and soil conditions (such as stored timber or timber structures), populations can be enormous, numbering in the millions, quickly destroying their host. Its diet is varied, as it will eat introduced plants, damaged ivory and leather, and wood and debris, and in fact almost anything organic. It becomes a major agricultural pest, to the extent that vegetable farming has been virtually abandoned in Northern Australia wherever this termite is numerous, which it is outside of the rain forest or bauxite soils. It has developed the ability to bore up into a living tree and ring bark it such that it dies and becomes the center of a colony.

Mastotermes darwiniensis is the only known host of the symbiotic protozoan Mixotricha paradoxa, remarkable for its multiple bacterial symbionts.
