= Alfred E. Emerson =

American entomologist

- Born: December 31, 1896; Ithaca, New York
- Died: October 3, 1976 (aged 79)
- Education: Cornell University
- Scientific career
- Fields: Entomology
- Workplaces: University of Chicago
- Doctoral students: Robert Sokal; Margaret Collins

Alfred Edwards Emerson, Jr. (December 31, 1896 – October 3, 1976) was an American biologist, Professor of Zoology at the University of Chicago, a noted entomologist and leading authority on termites.

== Life and work ==
Emerson was born in Ithaca, New York. His father, Alfred Emerson, Sr. was an archaeologist and professor at Cornell University, and his mother Alice Edwards Emerson a concert pianist. His grandfather was a Presbyterian pastor. Of his three older siblings, his sister Edith Emerson became an artist and museum curator, and another sister Gertrude Emerson Sen became the editor of Asia magazine in India. He took an interest in music in early life and while at the Interlaken School in Rolling Prairie, Indiana from 1910 to 1914 he started the school poultry farm. He then went to Cornell University to study poultry science but majored in entomology where he was taught by the Comstocks. One of his classmates was Karl P. Schmidt, the herpetologist. It was Cornell that Emerson met Winifred Jelliffe, daughter of a well-known psychiatrist. They got engaged in 1918, just before Emerson was drafted for nine months in the army. On a suggestion from William Beebe, he visited the research station of the New York Zoological Society at Kartabo in British Guiana and began examining termites, an area that he studied throughout his life. He married and made more trips to Kartabo. In 1921, he joined the University of Pittsburgh as an instructor. He obtained a PhD from Cornell in 1925 with a Guggenheim Fellowship. From 1929 to 1962 he was Professor of Zoology at the University of Chicago. In 1935 he visited the Barro Colorado Island. From 1940 to 1976 was Research Associate of the American Museum of Natural History. In 1941 he served as president of the Ecological Society of America, and in 1958 as president of the Society of Systematic Zoology.

Emerson and Winifred had a daughter, Helena, who became a professor of sociology, and a son William Jelliffe who worked on anatomy at the University of California. Winifred died in 1949 after which he married Eleanor Fish, with whom he had written a children's book Termite City (1937).

Emerson's collection of termites was donated to the American Museum of Natural History and contained about a million specimens of about 1745 species of termites.

In a posthumous biography of Emerson, Wilson and Michener (1982) stated:

"Until his death he was the leading authority on termites, a restless technical expert who contributed massively to their classification, anatomy, and biogeography. He was also an important contributor to modern ecology, one of the synthesizers of 1940s and 1950's who brought the large quantities of new data on adaptation, physiology, behavior, and distribution into line with the emerging principles."

Through his sister who lived in India, Emerson became a friend of the Indian prime minister Indira Gandhi and also collaborated with termite specialists at the Zoological Survey of India in Calcutta.

== Honors ==
Emerson was elected in 1926 a fellow of the American Association for the Advancement of Science and in 1937 a fellow of the Entomological Society of America.

== Publications ==
- 1925. Termites of the Belgian Congo and the Cameroon
- 1938. Termite nests--a study of the phylogeny of behavior
- 1939. "Social Coordination and the Superorganism" in: American Midland Naturalist. Vol. 21, No. 1 (Jan., 1939), pp. 182–209
- 1949. Principles of animal ecology. With W.C. Alice, O. Park, T. Park, and K.P. Schmidt. Philadelphia : Saunders.
