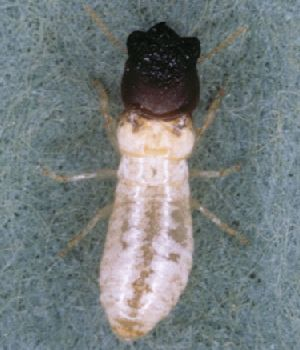
- Cryptotermes brevis

Scientific classification
- Kingdom: Animalia
- Phylum: Arthropoda
- Clade: Pancrustacea
- Class: Insecta
- Order: Blattodea
- Infraorder: Isoptera
- Parvorder: Euisoptera
- Family: Kalotermitidae; Froggatt, 1897

Genera
- See text

= Kalotermitidae =

Family of termites

Kalotermitidae (drywood termites), are a basal family with a roughly cosmopolitan circumtropical distribution. With 21 genera and 419 species, it is the second most diverse termite family after the Termitidae. The majority of members are functionally specialists of sound wood - though not necessarily dry wood. Hence, while not all Kalotermitidae taxa are commonly referred to as drywood termites, the name is commonly used to refer to the family itself. The family contains notable pest taxa such as Cryptotermes brevis and Incisitermes minor.

== Description ==
Kalotermitidae vary significantly in size (3mm - 20mm), however all castes possess pronotums as wide or wider than the head, often flatly arched; a morphology atypical to extant termites except for the alates of Mastotermes and thus characteristic of the family. Workers and soldiers are often compact or tubular in general appearance. The legs of Kalotermitidae possess a tarsal formula of 4-4-4, each leg possessing three tibial spurs. Similar to Mastotermitidae, the 1st and 2nd marginal teeth of the worker/imago mandibles are fused, leaving 3 distinct teeth including the apical. Typical to basal termites, individuals have a short flat clypeus. Due to a lack of overall morphological variation within the group, Kalotermitidae are very difficult to identify among each other even at the genus level, without access to the soldier caste or wing venation of the alates.

Alates of Kalotermitidae have two well developed lateral ocelli, except in the case of Roisinitermes, where they are absent. The forewing scale is significantly larger than the hindwing scale, and typical to lower termites, overlaps the latter. The wings of Kalotermitidae are usually short, with strongly sclerotized subcostal and radial veins (R1 and Rs), which run parallel with the subcostal. In some species the median vein is also strongly sclerotized. Many species possess pimple-like projections across the wing surface, which are often pigmented in addition to the wing itself.

Typically soldiers of Kalotermitidae have serrated robust mandibles. The head is usually large and truncated, with a short, unmodified labrum. In addition, the head capsule of many taxa display varying degrees of phragmosis, whereby the dorsal anterior portion of the head capsule is distended. This condition is most specialized in the genera of Cryptotermes and Eucryptotermes where the mandibles are more or less reduced, and the lateral distension projects forward or flares, producing a highly sclerotized roughly flat or concave surface. Soldiers of certain genera possess an enlarged clubbed shaped 3rd antennal segment, most pronounced in Marginitermes. In Roisinitermes, the mandibles are arranged in a symmetrical snapping configuration - the only documented case outside of the family Termitidae.

== Biology ==
Typical to most basal termites, Kalotermitidae possess a predominantly linear developmental system and lack a true worker; instead, immature individuals, termed pseudergates ("false workers") serve as workers before developing into either soldiers or reproductives. The appearance of immature workers in the Kalotermitidae is possible because of their hemimetabolous lifecycle; these immatures are "false" workers because, unlike in the holometabolous eusocial groups, no pupal stage clearly demarcates immaturity and adulthood, and their role as workers is temporary. Pseudergates can be differentiated from other categories of immatures by the absence of wing buds (which are already present in most hemimetabolous insects in their first instar) and are not necessarily the only constituent of the general work force in a kalotermitid colony.

Kalotermitidae are very typical of basal termites with a linear developmental system, and as such present the following characteristics: colonies are not adept at foraging or colonization of new food sources, remaining in a single piece of wood, and thus individuals stand to inherit the resources of the colony if they do not disperse by molting into alates. Kalotermitidae colonies are usually headed by only one pair of reproductives, regardless if these are primary or secondary reproductives (neotenics); reproductives suppress other individuals from molting into neotenics via pheromones. Polygyny appears to be uncommon in the group; genetically mixed colonies are likely the result of colony fusion of neighbouring colonies founded by monogamous primary reproductives. Likewise, intraspecific aggression is generally low, limited largely to or between individuals with reproductive potential, such as nymphs (pre-alates) or reproductives. Nest mates may bite or damage the developing wings of congeners, thereby preventing them from developing into alates, however it is unclear if these are siblings or unrelated individuals brought together via colony fusion. Sexual dimorphism is also low and colonies do not display a strong sex bias either in terms of population - however there seems to be some tendency for male neotenics, a notable example being some Neotermes species where the neotenic is almost exclusively male. Physogastry is rare in this group.

Parthogenesis (asexual reproduction) has been documented in various termite groups, including some Kalotermitidae, however most Kalotermitidae species are only facultatively parthenogenic, and parthenogenic eggs are a minority. Purely parthenogenetic reproduction has only been documented in certain populations of Glyptotermes nakajimai, which represents the only instance of a female only asexual termite species.

== Ecology ==
The Kalotermitidae are "primitive" in morphology, nesting behavior, and social organization. Unlike other termite species, they have no need to make contact with soil and live exclusively within excavations in wood, lacking elaborate nesting architecture.

Drywood termites have an adaptive mechanism for conserving water. Undigested matter in the alimentary canal passes through specialized rectal glands in the hindgut. These glands reabsorb water from the feces. They can tolerate dry conditions for long periods of time, receiving all of the moisture they need from the wood they live in and consume. Their mandibles are also fortified with zinc, as an adaptation to the mechanically difficult food source of dry wood.

Their diet of dry wood makes many of them economic and urban pests, causing damage to furniture, utility towers, stored wood, and buildings. Kalotermitids' global distribution may be partially attributable to rafting and timber movement. The species Cryptotermes brevis is particularly prevalent as a pest in the United States, and is found in Hawaii, Florida, and along the southeastern coast.

Alates fly during warm, sunny days, when temperatures range from 80 to 100 °F (27 to 38 °C). They emerge from exit holes in wood and take off in all directions. They exhibit phototropic behavior during dispersal flights, often aggregating at lights, with at least one species showing a preference for light with a wavelength between 460 and 550 nm. After landing, they break off their wings which they do by holding their wingtips against a substrate and turning until the wing breaks off at the base. Dealates find a mate and engage in courtship activity. King and Queen mate for life.

== Systematics ==
The Kalotermitidae belong to the "lower termites", a now-defunct paraphyletic assemblage which classifies termites based on the presence ("lower") or absence ("higher") of endosymbiotic gut flagellates in addition to bacteria. The "lower" termites include all termite families except the Termitidae, which alone constitute the "higher" termites. Recent phylogenetic studies have supported the Kalotermitidae as a monophyletic group.

The Kalotermitidae have no recognized classification above genera, the relationships between which are still largely unknown and poorly studied. Limited molecular evidence supports the genus Kalotermes as a basal lineage within the family, so is one of the most anciently diversifying, as well as having two major branches, in which Kalotermes is sister to Ceratokalotermes. However, this partially contradicts older morphological phylogenies, and is the result of a study limited to eight genera. The most extensive phylogenetic study of drywood termites revealed several instances of long-distance transoceanic dispersal during their extensive evolutionary history.

=== Genera ===
- Allotermes Wasmann, 1910
- Bicornitermes Krishna, 1961
- Bifiditermes Krishna, 1961
- Calcaritermes Snyder, 1925
- Ceratokalotermes Krishna, 1961
- Comatermes Krishna, 1961
- Cryptotermes Banks, 1906
- †Electrotermes Rosen, 1913
- †Eotermes Statz, 1939
- Epicalotermes Silvestri, 1918
- Eucryptotermes Holmgren, 1911
- Glyptotermes Froggatt, 1897
- †Huguenotermes Engel & Nel, 2015
- Incisitermes Krishna, 1961
- †Kachinitermes Engel, Grimaldi, & Krishna, 2007
- †Kachinitermopsis Engel & Delclòs, 2010
- Kalotermes Hagen, 1853
- Longicaputermes Ghesini, Marini, & Simon, 2014
- Marginitermes Krishna, 1961
- Neotermes Holmgren, 1911
- †Oligokalotermes Nel, 1987
- †Otagotermes Engel & Kaulfuss, 2017
- Paraneotermes Light, 1934
- Postelectrotermes Krishna, 1961
- Procryptotermes Holmgren, 1911
- †Proelectrotermes Rosen, 1913
- †Prokalotermes Emerson, 1933
- Proneotermes Holmgren, 1911
- Pterotermes Holmgren, 1911
- †Pterotermopsis Engel & Kaulfuss, 2017
- Roisinitermes Scheffrahn, 2018
- Rugitermes Holmgren, 1911
- †Taieritermes Engel & Kaulfuss, 2017
- Tauritermes Krishna, 1961
- †Valkyritermes Jouault, Engel, & Nel, 2022
- †Waipiatatermes Engel & Kaulfuss, 2017
