= Hymenaea allendis =

Hymenaea allendis Temporal range: Late Oligocene - early Miocene

Scientific classification
- Kingdom: Plantae
- Clade: Tracheophytes
- Clade: Angiosperms
- Clade: Eudicots
- Clade: Rosids
- Order: Fabales
- Family: Fabaceae
- Genus: Hymenaea
- Species: †H. allendis

Binomial name
- †Hymenaea allendis Calvillo-Canadell, Cevallos-Ferriz & Rico-Arce

Extinct species of legume

Hymenaea allendis is an extinct legume species in the family Fabaceae described from a single isolated fossil flower in amber. The species is known from a Late Oligocene to Early Miocene location in southern Mexico. Unlike the coeval extinct species Hymenaea mexicana and Hymenaea protera which are placed closer to the living species Hymenaea verrucosa of Africa, H. allendis is closer in relation to the neotropical species of Hymenaea.

== History and classification ==
Hymenaea allendis is known from a solitary fossil flower which is an inclusion in a transparent chunk of Mexican amber. The specimen is currently housed in the Eliseo Palacios Aguilera Paleontological Museum in Chiapas, Mexico. Mexican amber is recovered from fossil-bearing rocks in the Simojovel region of Chiapas, Mexico. The amber dates from between 22.5 million years old, for the youngest sediments of the Balumtun Sandstone, and 26 million years old for the oldest La Quinta Formation. This age range straddles the boundary between the Late Oligocene and Early Miocene and is complicated by both formations being secondary deposits for the amber; the age range is therefore only the youngest that it might be. The fossil was examined by paleobotanists Laura Calvillo-Canadell and Sergio Cevallos-Ferriz of the National Autonomous University of Mexico and Lourdes Rico-Arce of the Royal Botanic Gardens Kew, United Kingdom; Calvillo-Canadell, Cevallos-Ferriz and Rico-Arce's description of the species was published in a 2010 article in the Review of Palaeobotany and Palynology. The etymology of the chosen specific name allendis is in reference to the town Simojovel de Allende which is located within the amber mining area.

When described, H. allendis was the second Hymenaea species to be identified from fossils found in Mexican amber. The first species was Hymenaea mexicana, which was described by Poinar and Brown 2002, and which was to be the source for the resin which Mexican amber is derived from. Both H. protera, found in Dominican amber, and H. mexicana are placed closer to the single living old-world species, H. verrucosum, which is placed in the Hymenaea sect. Trachylobium. The smooth ovary with a small stipe and wide nectariferous disc are traits found only in the new world Hymenaea section Hymenaea.

== Description ==
The flower of H. allendis is small, with a hairy 11.3 millimetres (0.44 in) long and 3.8 millimetres (0.15 in) wide pedicel and as with H. mexicana the flower is bisexual. The preserved sepals are urn-shaped, showing a distinct row of hairs along the middle of the sepal underside and a smooth upper surface. The sepals form a calyx around the 1.4 millimetres (0.055 in) wide hypanthium. The sepals of the single flower described are detached which may be the result of an early caducous condition, which makes the total number of sepals born uncertain. Preserved stamens which were dislodged from the flower during entombment in the resin show two rows of bilocular anthers on their upper surfaces. The possibly elliptic-ovate petals distinguish the species from the living species Hymenaea courbaril.
