= Hymenaea mexicana =

Hymenaea mexicana Temporal range: Late Oligocene - early Miocene

Scientific classification
- Kingdom: Plantae
- Clade: Tracheophytes
- Clade: Angiosperms
- Clade: Eudicots
- Clade: Rosids
- Order: Fabales
- Family: Fabaceae
- Genus: Hymenaea
- Species: †H. mexicana

Binomial name
- †Hymenaea mexicana Poinar & Brown

Extinct species of legume

Hymenaea mexicana is an extinct legume species in the family Fabaceae described from a series of isolated fossil petals, leaflets, and amber. The species is known from a group of Late Oligocene to Early Miocene locations in southern Mexico. It is one of two extinct Hymenaea species placed close to the living species Hymenaea verrucosa and along with Hymenaea allendis, is one of the two extinct species which have been found in Mexican amber.

== History and classification ==
Hymenaea mexicana is known from a series of fossil flowers and leaves which are inclusions in transparent chunks of Mexican amber. The species where the amber was also found in was in Brazil which could indicate where the specie Hymenaea mexicana could have been located as well. The specimens were collected over the course of twenty five years with a total of thirty amber specimens being examined for the description of the species. Mexican amber is recovered from fossil-bearing rocks in the Simojovel region of Chiapas, Mexico. The amber dates from between 22.5 million years old, for the youngest sediments of the Balumtun Sandstone, and 26 million years old for the oldest La Quinta Formation. This age range straddles the boundary between the Late Oligocene and Early Miocene and is complicated by both formations being secondary deposits for the amber; the age range is therefore only the youngest that it might be. The fossils were examined by paleobotanists George Poinar Jr. of Oregon State University and Alex Brown of Berkeley, California; Poinar and Brown's description of the species was published in a 2002 article in the Botanical Journal of the Linnean Society. The etymology of the chosen specific name mexicana was indicated in the type description. Insect interaction with Hymenaea mexicana was indicated in a number of the fossils examined. Several of the petals showed insect feeding damage while one of the leaves showed distinct skeletonization, a feeding method often found in Lepidopterans like the family Gracillariidae moths. The possible pollinator for H. mexicana is suggested to be the stingless bee species Nogueirapis silacea based on an isolated stamen which is preserved in association with five N. silacea bees. When described, Poinar and Brown suggested Mexican amber was derived from H. mexicana resin. In 2011 another Hymenaea species, H. allendis, was described from fossils also found in the amber.

== Description ==
The leaflets of H. mexicana are an inequilateral falcate shape with the lamina at the base uneven and the outside leaf margin more rounded then the inside margin. The single full leaflet is 55 millimetres (2.2 in) long and 17 millimetres (0.67 in) in width, with a leaf petiole that is 2.7 millimetres (0.11 in) long on the inside margin of the base, and sessile on the outside margin. The flowers bisexual and small, being 2.5 millimetres (0.098 in) tall and 20 millimetres (0.79 in) from sepal to sepal. A distinct pubescence ranging from dark brown to tan covers the flower. The preserved petals show distinct resin pockets on their surface and a distinct row of hairs along the midvein.
