= Triasacarus =

Triasacarus Temporal range: Late Triassic Carnian

Scientific classification
- Domain: Eukaryota
- Kingdom: Animalia
- Phylum: Arthropoda
- Subphylum: Chelicerata
- Class: Arachnida
- Genus: †Triasacarus
- Species: †T. fedelei

Binomial name
- †Triasacarus fedelei Schmidt et al., 2012

Extinct genus of spiders

Triasacarus fedelei is an extinct species of gall mite described from the Carnian of northeastern Italy. It lived as a parasite of Cheirolepidiaceae trees. The only known specimen, preserved in amber, is 0.210 mm long. Along with Ampezzoa triassica and an unnamed dipteran, it is the oldest arthropod found enclosed in amber.

It is possible that Triasacarus induced the formation of galls on the host plant.
