= Ampezzoa =

Ampezzoa Temporal range: Late Triassic Carnian

Scientific classification
- Kingdom: Animalia
- Phylum: Arthropoda
- Subphylum: Chelicerata
- Class: Arachnida
- Genus: †Ampezzoa
- Species: †A. triassica

Binomial name
- †Ampezzoa triassica Schmidt et al., 2012

Extinct genus of mites

Ampezzoa triassica is an extinct species of gall mite described from the Carnian of northeastern Italy. It lived as a parasite of Cheirolepidiaceae trees. The only known specimen, preserved in amber, is 0.124 mm long. It resembles very much, in body shape and wax secretions, the contemporary gall mite Cymeda zealandica. Along with Triasacarus fedelei and an unnamed dipteran, it is the oldest arthropod found enclosed in amber.

Ampezzoa had a vagrant lifestyle on the surface of its host. It secreted waxy filaments, as a defense against predation and desiccation.
