= Amber =

Fossilized tree resin

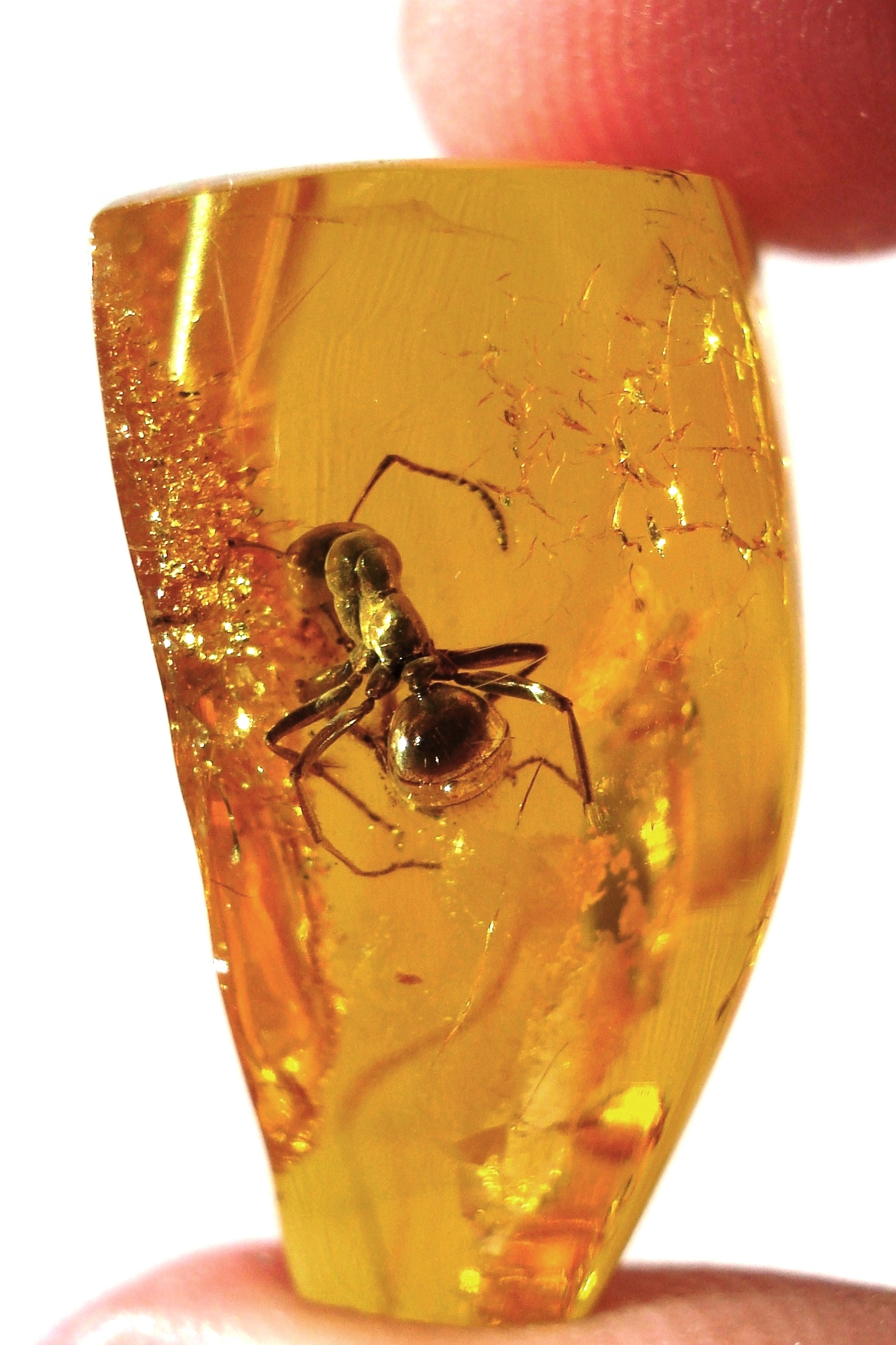
An ant inside Baltic amber

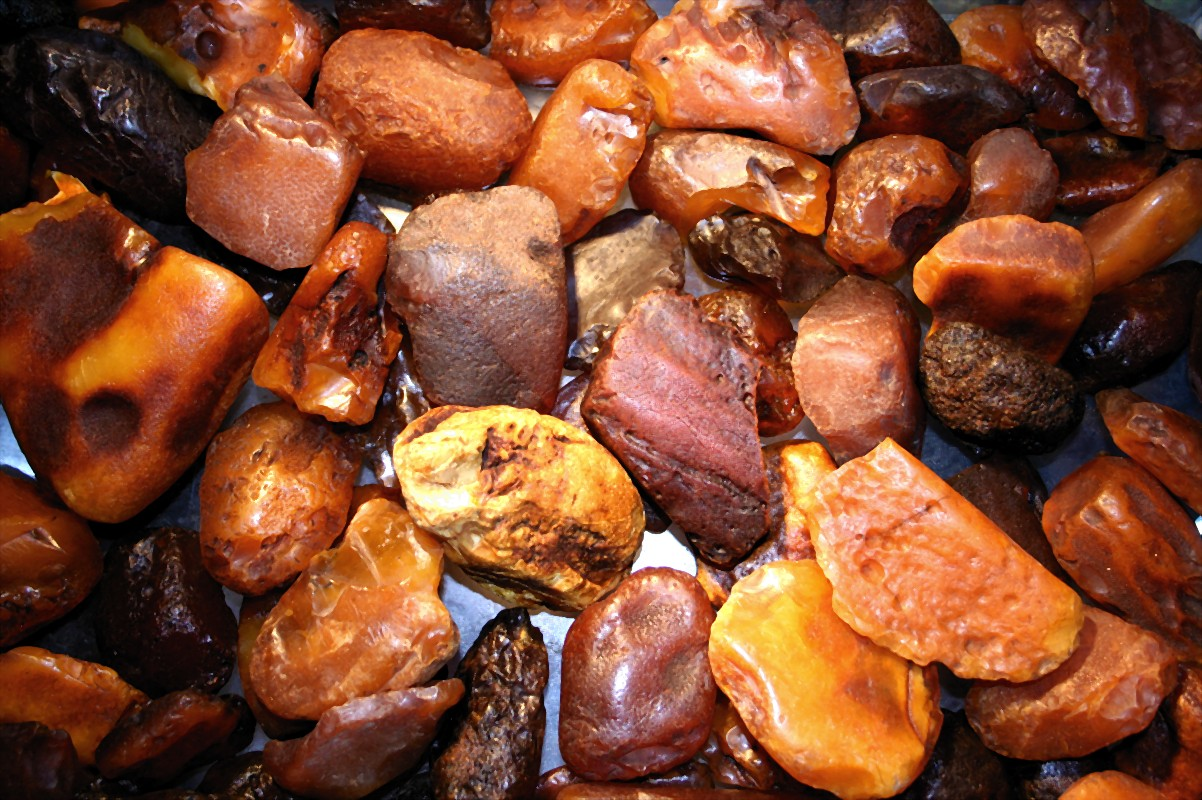
Unpolished amber stones

Amber is fossilized tree resin. It has been appreciated for its color (orange, brown and, sometimes, red) and natural beauty since Neolithic times, and worked as a gemstone since classical antiquity. Amber is used in jewelry and as a healing agent in folk medicine.

There are over 150 types of amber and there are five classes of amber, defined on the basis of their chemical constituents. Because it originates as a soft, sticky tree resin, amber sometimes contains animal and plant material as inclusions. Amber occurring in coal seams is also called resinite, and the term ambrite is applied to that found specifically within New Zealand coal seams.

== Etymology ==
The English word amber derives from Arabic ʿanbar عنبر from Middle Persian 𐭠𐭭𐭡𐭫 (ʾnbl /ambar/, "ambergris") via Middle Latin ambar and Middle French ambre. The word referred to what is now known as ambergris (ambre gris or "gray amber"), a solid waxy substance derived from the sperm whale. The word, in its sense of "ambergris", was adopted in Middle English in the 14th century.

In the Romance languages, the sense of the word was extended to Baltic amber (fossil resin) from as early as the late 13th century. At first called white or yellow amber (ambre jaune), this meaning was adopted in English by the early 15th century. As the use of ambergris waned, this became the main sense of the word.

The two substances ("yellow amber" and "gray amber") conceivably became associated or confused because they both were found washed up on beaches. Ambergris is less dense than water and floats, whereas amber is denser and floats only in concentrated saline, or strong salty seawater though less dense than stone.

The classical names for amber, Ancient Greek ἤλεκτρον (ēlektron) and one of its Latin names, electrum, (Note: In Latin the name succinum was unambiguously used for amber while electrum was also used for an alloy of gold and silver.) are connected to a term ἠλέκτωρ (ēlektōr) meaning "beaming Sun". According to myth, when Phaëton, son of Helios (the Sun), was killed his mourning sisters became poplar trees, and their tears became elektron, amber. The word elektron gave rise to the words electric, electricity, and their relatives because of amber's ability to bear a charge of static electricity. This property is due to its effectiveness as an electrical insulator, which does not allow electron motion from the surface through the substance.

=== Varietal names ===
A number of regional and varietal names have been applied to ambers over the centuries, including allingite, beckerite, gedanite, kochenite, krantzite, and stantienite.

== History ==
Theophrastus discussed amber in the 4th century BCE, as did Pytheas (c. 330 BCE), whose work "On the Ocean" is lost, but was referenced by Pliny, according to whose Natural History:

Pytheas says that the Gutones, a people of Germany, inhabit the shores of an estuary of the Ocean called Mentonomon, their territory extending a distance of six thousand stadia; that, at one day's sail from this territory, is the Isle of Abalus, upon the shores of which, amber is thrown up by the waves in spring, it being an excretion of the sea in a concrete form; as, also, that the inhabitants use this amber by way of fuel, and sell it to their neighbors, the Teutones.

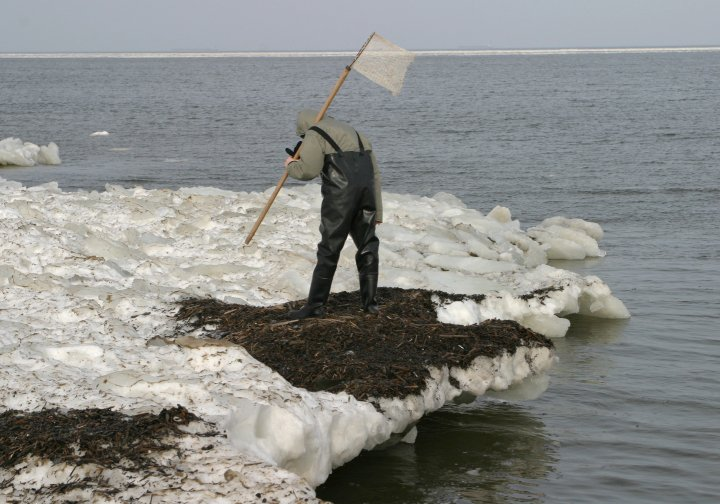
Fishing for amber on the coast of Baltic Sea, near Gdańsk, Poland. Winter storms throw out amber nuggets.

Earlier Pliny says that Pytheas refers to a large island—three days' sail from the Scythian coast and called Balcia by Xenophon of Lampsacus (author of a fanciful travel book in Greek)—as Basilia—a name generally equated with Abalus. Given the presence of amber, the island could have been Heligoland, Zealand, the shores of Gdańsk Bay, the Sambia Peninsula or the Curonian Lagoon, which were historically the richest sources of amber in northern Europe. There were well-established trade routes for amber connecting the Baltic with the Mediterranean (known as the "Amber Road"). Pliny states explicitly that the Germans exported amber to Pannonia, from where the Veneti distributed it onwards.

The ancient Italic peoples of southern Italy used to work amber; the National Archaeological Museum of Siritide (Museo Archeologico Nazionale della Siritide) at Policoro in the province of Matera (Basilicata) displays important surviving examples. It has been suggested that amber used in antiquity, as at Mycenae and in the prehistory of the Mediterranean, came from deposits in Sicily.

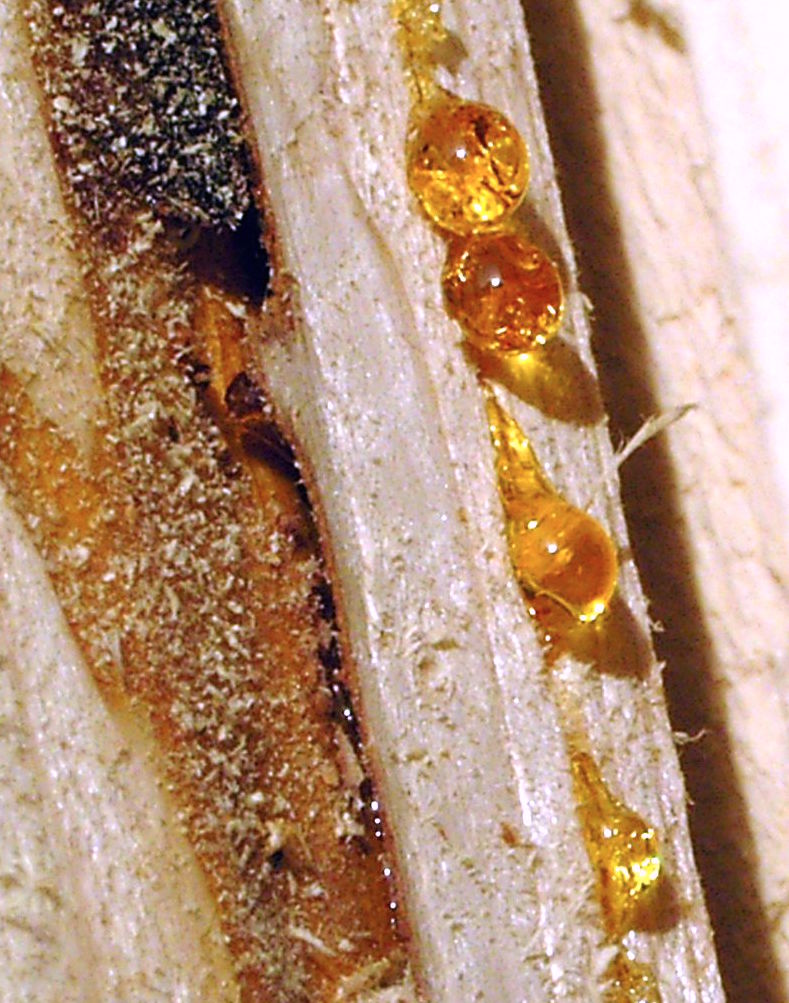
Wood resin, the source of amber

Pliny also cites the opinion of Nicias (c. 470–413 BCE), according to whom amber

is a liquid produced by the rays of the sun; and that these rays, at the moment of the sun's setting, striking with the greatest force upon the surface of the soil, leave upon it an unctuous sweat, which is carried off by the tides of the Ocean, and thrown up upon the shores of Germany.

Besides the fanciful explanations according to which amber is "produced by the Sun", Pliny cites opinions that are well aware of its origin in tree resin, citing the native Latin name of succinum (sūcinum, from sucus "juice"). In Book 37, section XI of Natural History, Pliny wrote:

Amber is produced from a marrow discharged by trees belonging to the pine genus, like gum from the cherry, and resin from the ordinary pine. It is a liquid at first, which issues forth in considerable quantities, and is gradually hardened [...] Our forefathers, too, were of opinion that it is the juice of a tree, and for this reason gave it the name of "succinum" and one great proof that it is the produce of a tree of the pine genus, is the fact that it emits a pine-like smell when rubbed, and that it burns, when ignited, with the odour and appearance of torch-pine wood.

He also states that amber is also found in Egypt and India, and he even refers to the electrostatic properties of amber, by saying that "in Syria the women make the whorls of their spindles of this substance, and give it the name of harpax [from ἁρπάζω, "to drag"] from the circumstance that it attracts leaves towards it, chaff, and the light fringe of tissues".

The Romans traded for amber from the shores of the southern Baltic at least as far back as the time of Nero.

Amber has a long history of use in China, with the first written record from 200 BCE. Early in the 19th century, the first reports of amber found in North America came from discoveries in New Jersey along Crosswicks Creek near Trenton, at Camden, and near Woodbury.

== Composition ==
Amber is heterogeneous in composition, consisting of several resinous substances that are more or less soluble in alcohol, ether, and chloroform, along with an insoluble bituminous fraction. It is a macromolecule formed by free radical polymerization of terpenoid precursors—diterpenes in gymnosperms, particularly labdane-type compounds such as communic acid, communol, and biformene. In angiosperms, the terpenoids are dominated by triterpenes, although amber from the family Fabaceae also contains labdane-based diterpenes. These compounds provide alkene groups that enable polymerization. Over time, amber matures through further polymerization, isomerization, crosslinking, and cyclization, resulting in its characteristic stable, fossilized structure.

Most amber has a hardness between 2.0 and 2.5 on the Mohs scale, a refractive index of 1.5–1.6, a specific gravity between 1.06 and 1.10, and a melting point of 250–300 °C. Heated above 200 °C (392 °F), amber decomposes, yielding an oil of amber, and leaves a black residue which is known as "amber colophony", or "amber pitch"; when dissolved in oil of turpentine or in linseed oil this forms "amber varnish" or "amber lac".

Impurities are quite often present, especially when the resin has dropped onto the ground, so the material may be useless except for varnish-making. Such impure amber is called firniss. Such inclusion of other substances can cause the amber to have an unexpected color. Pyrites may give a bluish color. Bony amber owes its cloudy opacity to numerous tiny bubbles inside the resin. However, so-called black amber is really a kind of jet. In darkly clouded and even opaque amber, inclusions can be imaged using high-energy, high-contrast, high-resolution X-rays.

== Formation ==
Molecular polymerization, resulting from high pressures and temperatures produced by overlying sediment, transforms the resin first into copal. Sustained heat and pressure drives off terpenes and results in the formation of amber. For this to happen, the resin must be resistant to decay. Many trees produce resin, but in the majority of cases this deposit is broken down by physical and biological processes. Exposure to sunlight, rain, microorganisms, and extreme temperatures tends to disintegrate the resin. For the resin to survive long enough to become amber, it must be resistant to such forces or be produced under conditions that exclude them. Fossil resins from Europe fall into two categories, the Baltic ambers and another that resembles the Agathis group. Fossil resins from the Americas and Africa are closely related to the modern genus Hymenaea, while Baltic ambers are thought to be fossil resins from plants of the family Sciadopityaceae that once lived in north Europe.

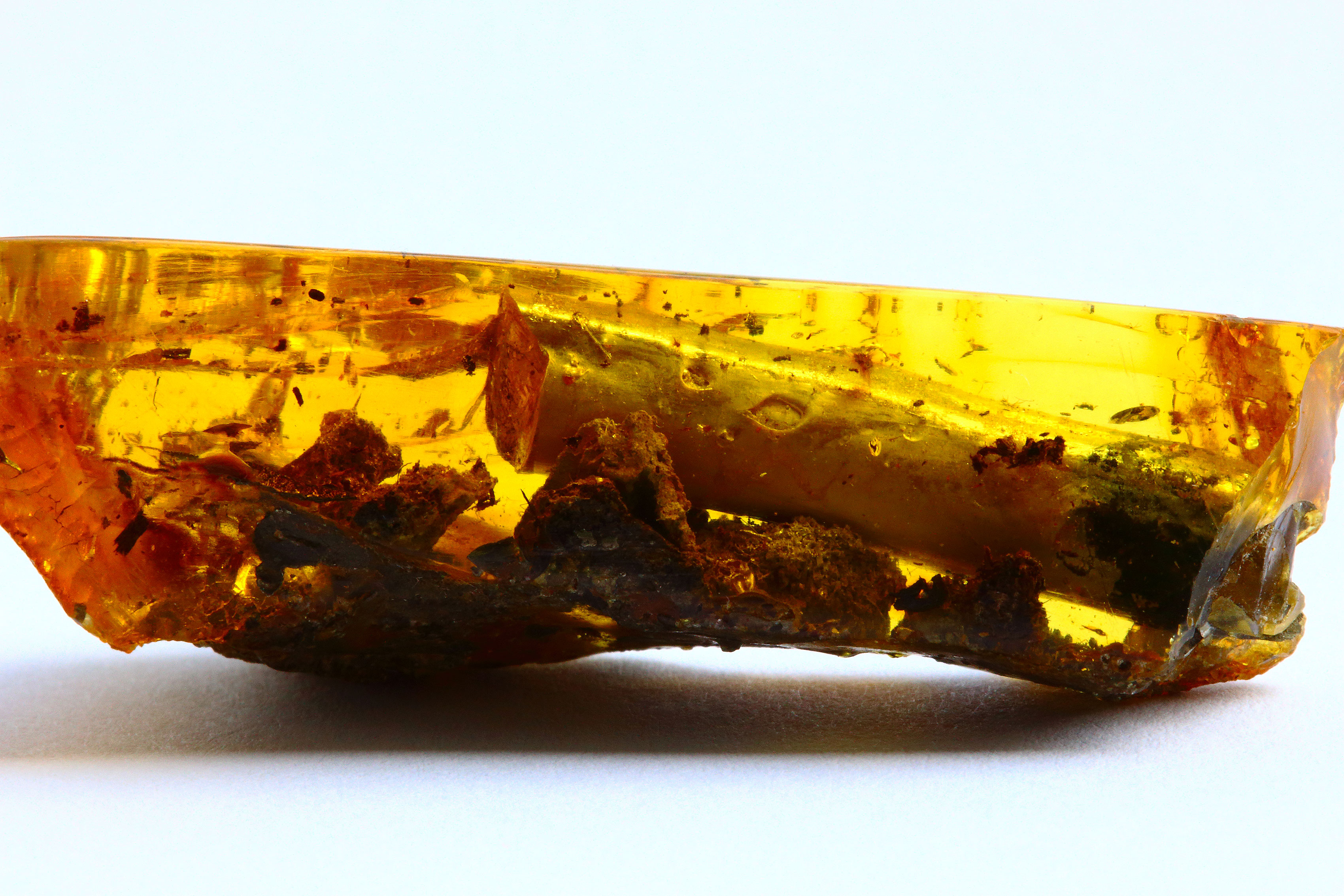
Baltic amber with inclusions

The abnormal development of resin in living trees (succinosis) can result in the formation of amber.

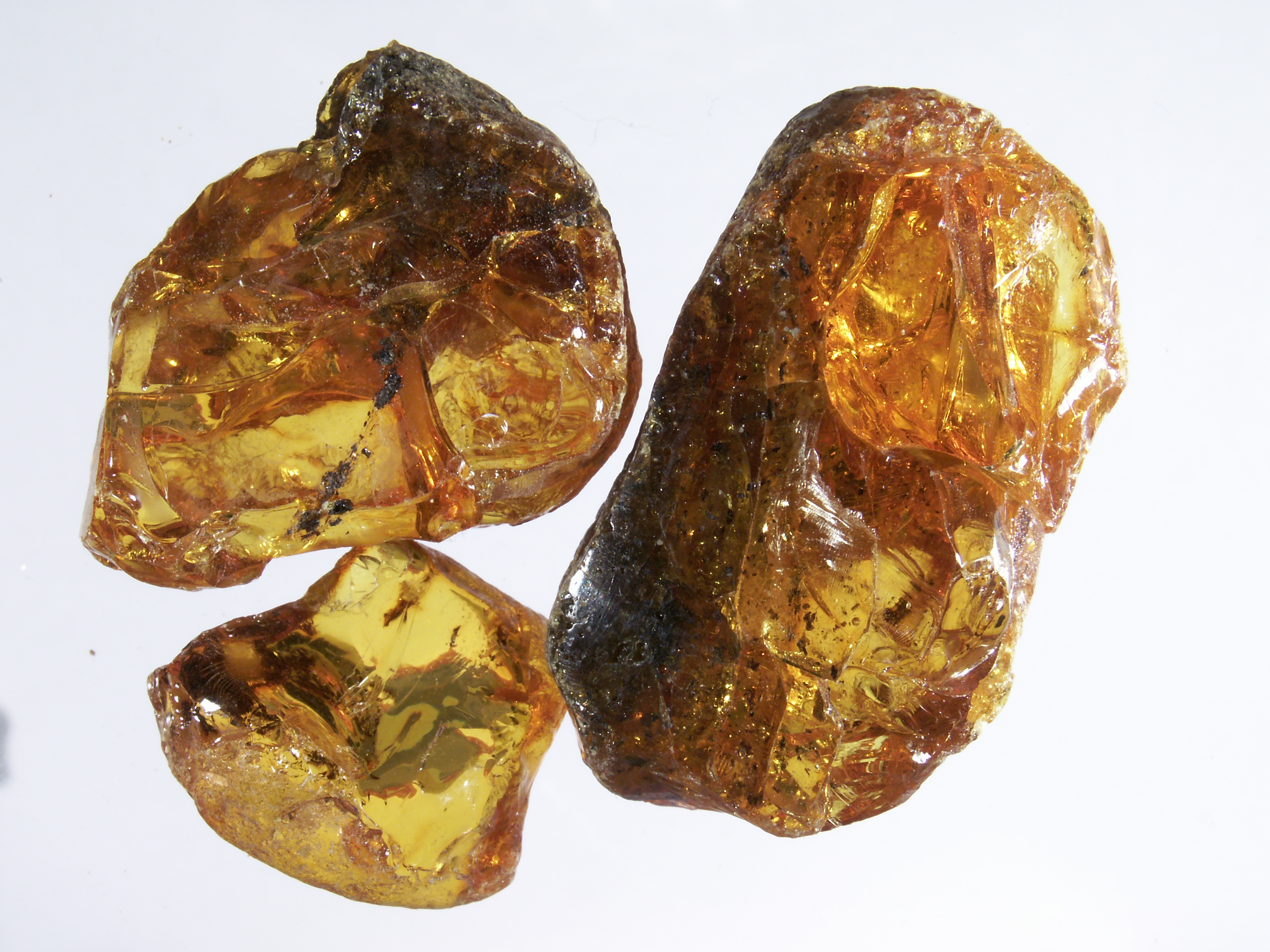
Amber from Bitterfeld

== Extraction and processing ==
=== Distribution and mining ===
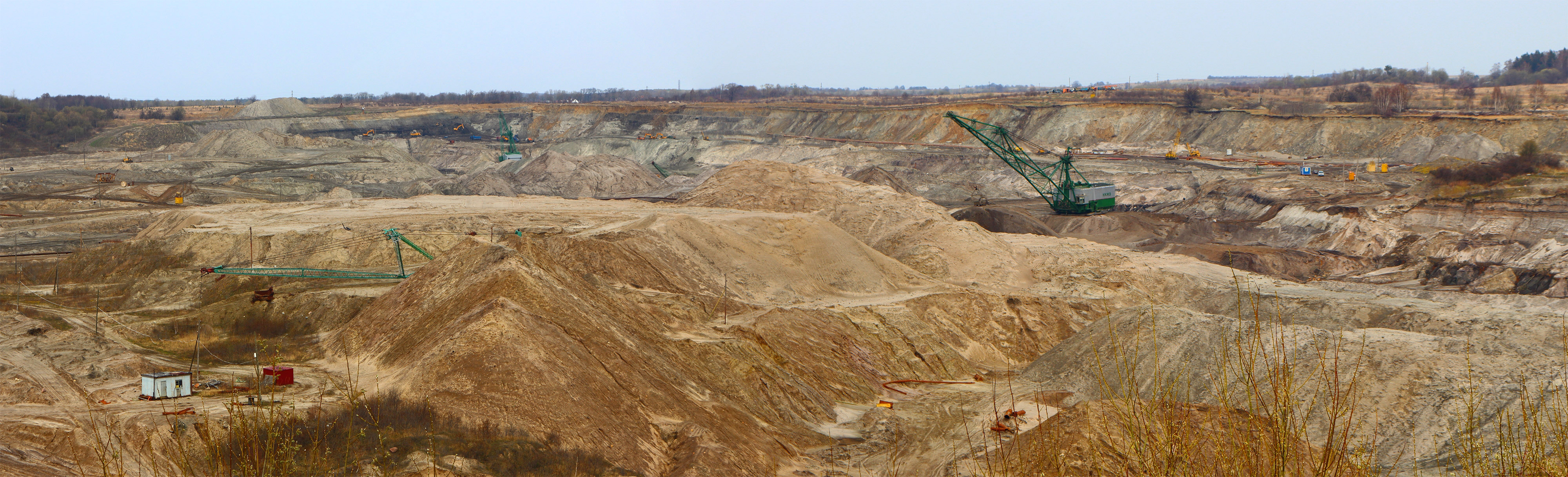
Open cast amber mine "Primorskoje" in Jantarny, Kaliningrad Oblast, Russia

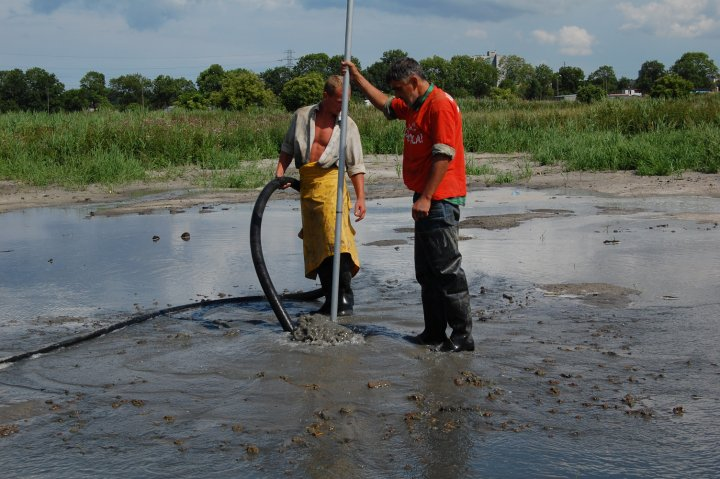
Extracting Baltic amber from Holocene deposits, Gdańsk, Poland

Amber is globally distributed in or around all continents, mainly in rocks of Cretaceous age or younger. Historically, the coast west of Königsberg in Prussia was the world's leading source of amber. The first mentions of amber deposits there date back to the 12th century. Juodkrantė in Lithuania was established in the mid-19th century as a mining town of amber. About 90% of the world's extractable amber is still located in that area, which was transferred to the Russian Soviet Federative Socialist Republic of the USSR in 1946, becoming the Kaliningrad Oblast.

Pieces of amber torn from the seafloor are cast up by the waves and collected by hand, dredging, or diving. Elsewhere, amber is mined, both in open works and underground galleries. Then nodules of blue earth have to be removed and an opaque crust must be cleaned off, which can be done in revolving barrels containing sand and water. Erosion removes this crust from sea-worn amber. Dominican amber is mined through bell pitting, which is dangerous because of the risk of tunnel collapse.

An important source of amber is Kachin State in northern Myanmar, which has been a major source of amber in China for at least 1,800 years. Contemporary mining of this deposit has attracted attention for unsafe working conditions and its role in funding internal conflict in the country. Amber from the Rivne Oblast of Ukraine, referred to as Rivne amber, is mined illegally by organised crime groups, who deforest the surrounding areas and pump water into the sediments to extract the amber, causing severe environmental deterioration.

=== Treatment ===
The Vienna amber factories, which use pale amber to manufacture pipes and other smoking tools, turn it on a lathe and polish it with whitening and water or with rotten stone and oil. The final luster is given by polishing with flannel.

When gradually heated in an oil bath, amber "becomes soft and flexible. Two pieces of amber may be united by smearing the surfaces with linseed oil, heating them, and then pressing them together while hot. Cloudy amber may be clarified in an oil bath, as the oil fills the numerous pores that cause the turbidity. Small fragments, formerly thrown away or used only for varnish are now used on a large scale in the formation of "ambroid" or "pressed amber". The pieces are carefully heated with exclusion of air and then compressed into a uniform mass by intense hydraulic pressure, the softened amber being forced through holes in a metal plate. The product is extensively used for the production of cheap jewelry and articles for smoking. This pressed amber yields brilliant interference colors in polarized light."

Amber has often been imitated by other resins like copal and kauri gum, as well as by celluloid and even glass. Baltic amber is sometimes colored artificially but also called "true amber".

== Appearance ==
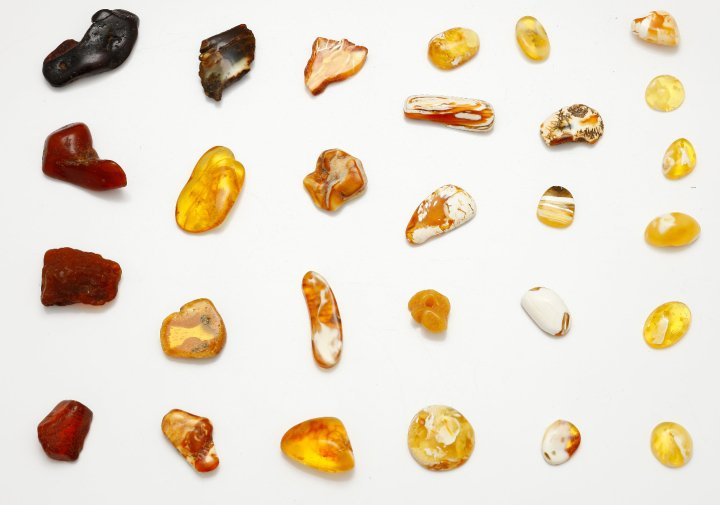
Unique colors of Baltic amber. Polished stones.

Amber occurs in a range of different colors. As well as the usual yellow-orange-brown that is associated with the color "amber", amber can range from a whitish color through a pale lemon yellow, to brown and almost black. Other uncommon colors include red amber (sometimes known as "cherry amber"), green amber, and even blue amber, which is rare and highly sought after.

Yellow amber is a hard fossil resin from evergreen trees, and despite the name it can be translucent, yellow, orange, or brown colored. Known to the Iranians by the Pahlavi compound word kah-ruba (from kah "straw" plus rubay "attract, snatch", referring to its electrical properties), which entered Arabic as kahraba' or kahraba (which later became the Arabic word for electricity, كهرباء kahrabā'), it too was called amber in Europe (Old French and Middle English ambre). Found along the southern shore of the Baltic Sea, yellow amber reached the Middle East and western Europe via trade. Its coastal acquisition may have been one reason yellow amber came to be designated by the same term as ambergris. Moreover, like ambergris, the resin could be burned as an incense. The resin's most popular use was, however, for ornamentation—easily cut and polished, it could be transformed into beautiful jewelry. Much of the most highly prized amber is transparent, in contrast to the very common cloudy amber and opaque amber. Opaque amber contains numerous minute bubbles. This kind of amber is known as "bony amber".

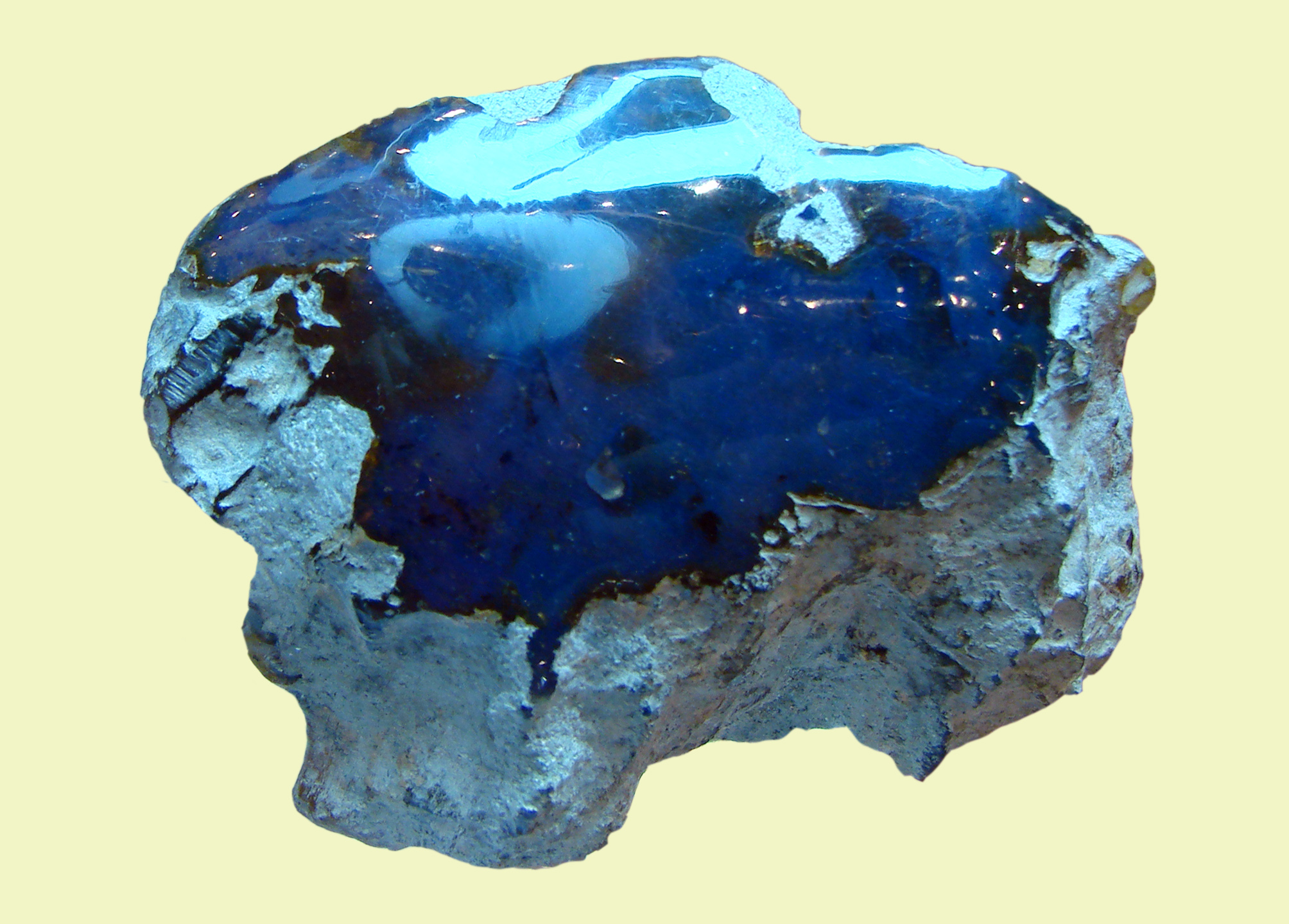
Blue amber from Dominican Republic

Although all Dominican amber is fluorescent, the rarest Dominican amber is blue amber. It turns blue in natural sunlight and any other partially or wholly ultraviolet light source. In long-wave UV light it has a very strong reflection, almost white. Only about 100 kg (220 lb) is found per year, which makes it valuable and expensive.

Sometimes amber retains the form of drops and stalactites, just as it exuded from the ducts and receptacles of the injured trees. It is thought that, in addition to exuding onto the surface of the tree, amber resin also originally flowed into hollow cavities or cracks within trees, thereby leading to the development of large lumps of amber of irregular form.

== Classification ==
Amber can be classified into several forms. Most fundamentally, there are two types of plant resin with the potential for fossilization. Terpenoids, produced by conifers and angiosperms, consist of ring structures formed of isoprene (C_{5}H_{8}) units. Phenolic resins are today only produced by angiosperms, and tend to serve functional uses. The extinct medullosans produced a third type of resin, which is often found as amber within their veins. The composition of resins is highly variable; each species produces a unique blend of chemicals which can be identified by the use of pyrolysis–gas chromatography–mass spectrometry. The overall chemical and structural composition is used to divide ambers into five classes. There is also a separate classification of amber gemstones, according to the way of production set by the IAA (International Amber Association).

=== Class I ===
This class is by far the most abundant. It comprises labdatriene carboxylic acids such as communic or ozic acids. It is further split into three sub-classes. Classes Ia and Ib utilize regular labdanoid diterpenes (e.g. communic acid, communol, biformenes), while Ic uses enantio labdanoids (ozic acid, ozol, enantio biformenes).

Class Ia includes succinite (= 'normal' Baltic amber) and glessite. They have a communic acid base, and they also include much succinic acid. Baltic amber yields on dry distillation succinic acid, the proportion varying from about 3% to 8%, and being greatest in the pale opaque or bony varieties. The aromatic and irritating fumes emitted by burning amber are mainly from this acid. Baltic amber is distinguished by its yield of succinic acid, hence the name succinite. Succinite has a hardness between 2 and 3, which is greater than many other fossil resins. Its specific gravity varies from 1.05 to 1.10. It can be distinguished from other ambers via infrared spectroscopy through a specific carbonyl absorption peak. Infrared spectroscopy can detect the relative age of an amber sample. Succinic acid may not be an original component of amber but rather a degradation product of abietic acid.

Class Ib ambers are based on communic acid; however, they lack succinic acid.

Class Ic is mainly based on enantio-labdatrienonic acids, such as ozic and zanzibaric acids. Its most familiar representative is Dominican amber,. which is mostly transparent and often contains a higher number of fossil inclusions. This has enabled the detailed reconstruction of the ecosystem of a long-vanished tropical forest. Resin from the extinct species Hymenaea protera is the source of Dominican amber and probably of most amber found in the tropics. It is not "succinite" but "retinite".

=== Class II ===
These ambers are formed from resins with a sesquiterpenoid base, such as cadinene.

=== Class III ===
These ambers are polystyrenes.

=== Class IV ===
Class IV is something of a catch-all: its ambers are not polymerized, but mainly consist of cedrene-based sesquiterpenoids.

=== Class V ===
Class V resins are considered to be produced by a pine or pine relative. They comprise a mixture of diterpinoid resins and n-alkyl compounds. Their main variety is Highgate copalite.

== Geological record ==
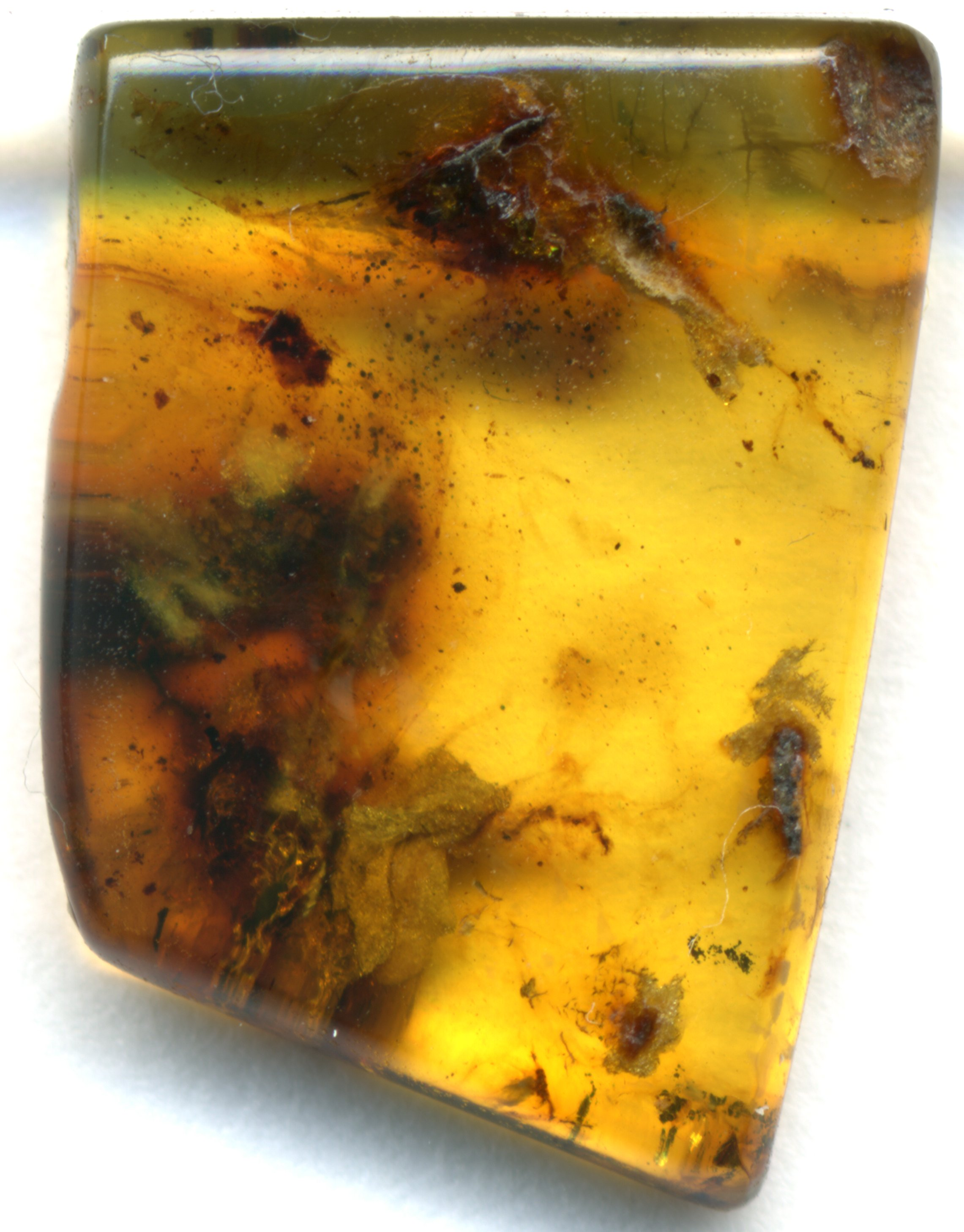
Typical amber specimen with a number of indistinct inclusions

The oldest amber recovered dates to the Middle Devonian (385 million years ago). Its chemical composition makes it difficult to match the amber to its producers – it is most similar to the resins produced by flowering plants; however, the first flowering plants appeared in the Early Cretaceous, more than 240 million years after the oldest amber known to date, and they were not common until the Late Cretaceous. Amber becomes abundant long after the Carboniferous, in the Early Cretaceous, when it is found in association with insects. The oldest amber with arthropod inclusions comes from the Late Triassic (late Carnian c. 230 Ma) of Italy, where four microscopic (0.2–0.1 mm) mites, Triasacarus, Ampezzoa, Minyacarus and Cheirolepidoptus, and a poorly preserved nematoceran fly were found in millimetre-sized droplets of amber. The oldest amber with significant numbers of arthropod inclusions comes from Lebanon. This amber, referred to as Lebanese amber, is roughly 125–135 million years old, is considered of high scientific value, providing evidence of some of the oldest sampled ecosystems.

In Lebanon, more than 450 outcrops of Lower Cretaceous amber were discovered by Dany Azar, a Lebanese paleontologist and entomologist. Among these outcrops, 20 have yielded biological inclusions comprising the oldest representatives of several recent families of terrestrial arthropods. Even older Jurassic amber has been found recently in Lebanon as well. Many remarkable insects and spiders were recently discovered in the amber of Jordan including the oldest zorapterans, clerid beetles, umenocoleid roaches, and achiliid planthoppers.

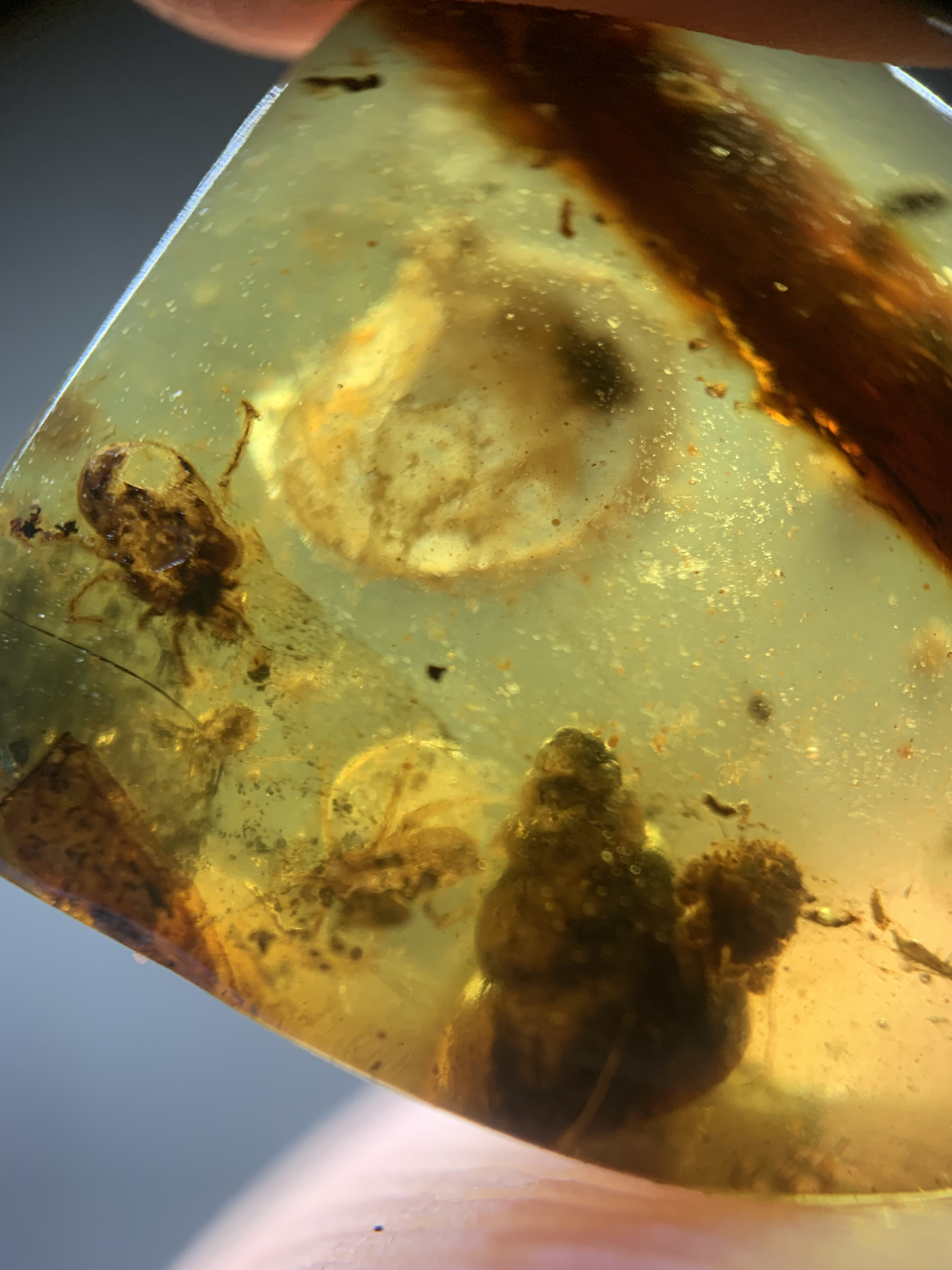
A snail and a few insects trapped within Burmese amber

Burmese Amber (burmite) from the Hukawng Valley in northern Myanmar is the only commercially exploited Cretaceous amber. Uranium–lead dating of zircon crystals associated with the deposit have given an estimated depositional age of approximately 99 million years ago. Approximately 3,218 species have been described from Burmese Amber, with over 300 in 2019 alone.

Baltic amber is found as irregular nodules in marine glauconitic sand, known as blue earth, occurring in Upper Eocene strata of Sambia in Prussia. It appears to have been partly derived from older Eocene deposits and it occurs also as a derivative phase in later formations, such as glacial drift. Relics of an abundant flora occur as inclusions trapped within the amber while the resin was yet fresh, suggesting relations with the flora of eastern Asia and the southern part of North America. Heinrich Göppert named the common amber-yielding pine of the Baltic forests Pinites succiniter, but as the wood does not seem to differ from that of the existing genus it has been also called Pinus succinifera. It is improbable that the production of amber was limited to a single species; and indeed a large number of conifers belonging to different genera are represented in the amber-flora.

=== Paleontological significance ===
Amber is a unique preservational mode, preserving otherwise unfossilizable parts of organisms; as such it is helpful in the reconstruction of ecosystems as well as organisms; the chemical composition of the resin, however, is of limited utility in reconstructing the phylogenetic affinity of the resin producer. Amber sometimes contains animals or plant matter that became caught in the resin as it was secreted. Insects, spiders and even their webs, annelids, frogs, crustaceans, bacteria and amoebae, marine microfossils, wood, flowers and fruit, hair, feathers and other small organisms have been recovered in Cretaceous ambers (deposited c. 130 million years ago). An ammonite Puzosia (Bhimaites) and marine gastropods have been found in Burmese amber.

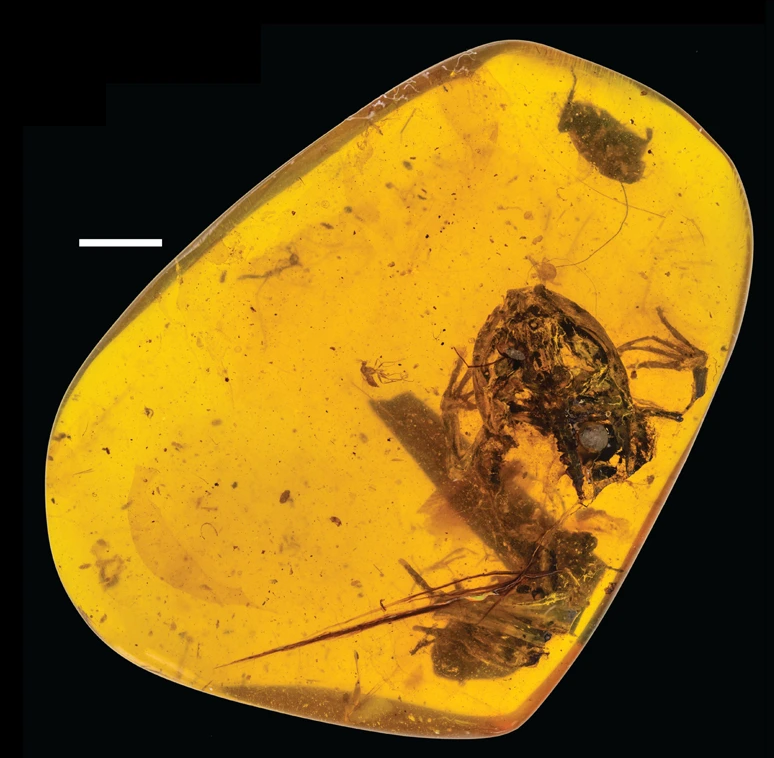
Skeleton of the frog Electrorana preserved in mid-Cretaceous Burmese amber.

The preservation of prehistoric organisms in amber forms a key plot point in Michael Crichton's 1990 novel Jurassic Park and the 1993 movie adaptation by Steven Spielberg. In the story, scientists are able to extract the preserved blood of dinosaurs from prehistoric mosquitoes trapped in amber, from which they genetically clone living dinosaurs. Scientifically this is as yet impossible, since no amber with fossilized mosquitoes has ever yielded preserved blood. Amber is, however, conducive to preserving DNA, since it dehydrates and thus stabilizes organisms trapped inside. One projection in 1999 estimated that DNA trapped in amber could last up to 100 million years, far beyond most estimates of around 1 million years in the most ideal conditions, although a later 2013 study was unable to extract DNA from insects trapped in much more recent Holocene copal. In 1938, 12-year-old David Attenborough was given a piece of amber containing prehistoric creatures from his adoptive sister; it would be the focus of his 2004 BBC documentary The Amber Time Machine.

== Use ==
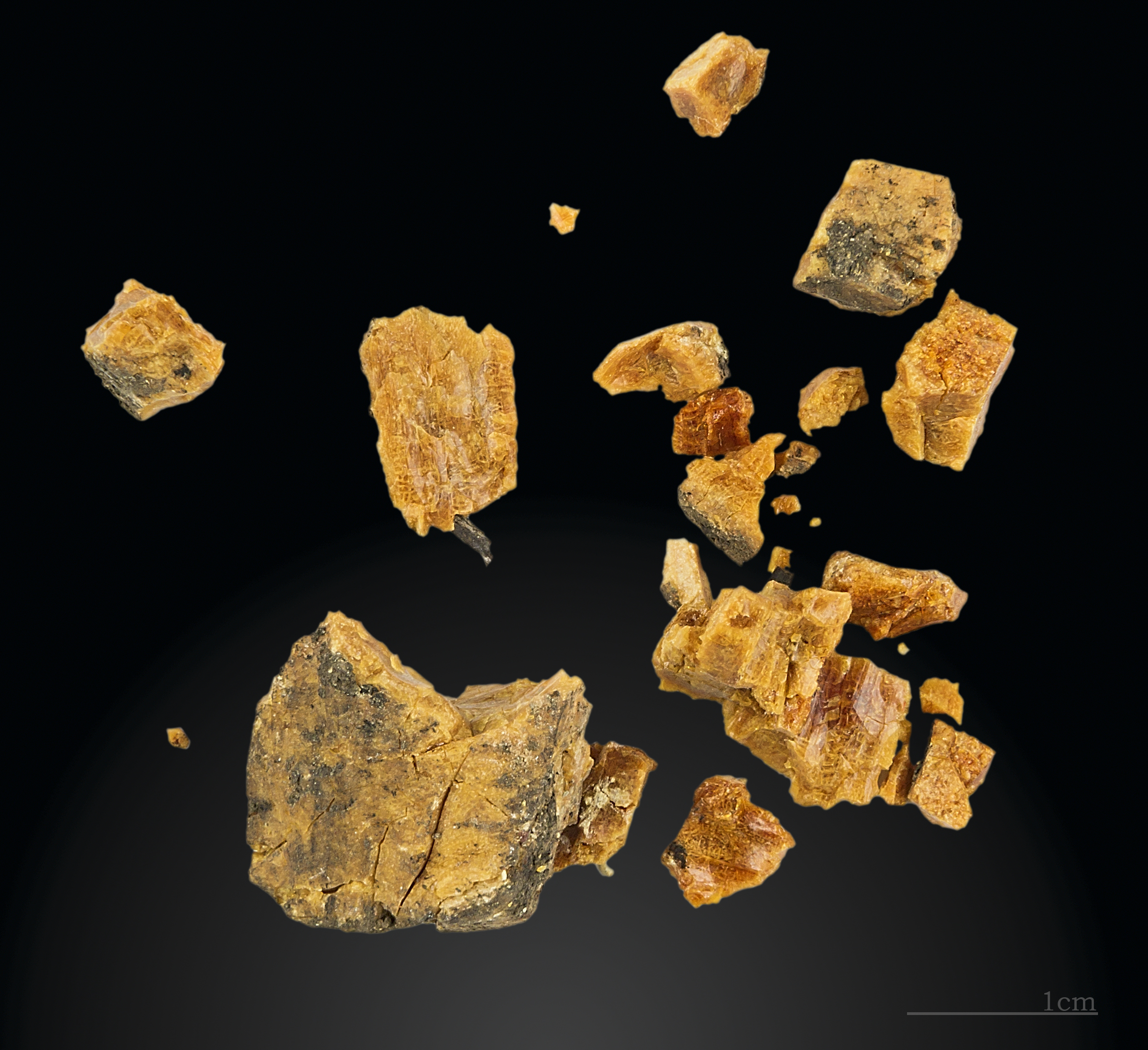
Solutrean amber from Altamira in the Muséum de Toulouse

Amber has been used since prehistory (Solutrean) in the manufacture of jewelry and ornaments, and also in folk medicine.

=== Jewelry ===
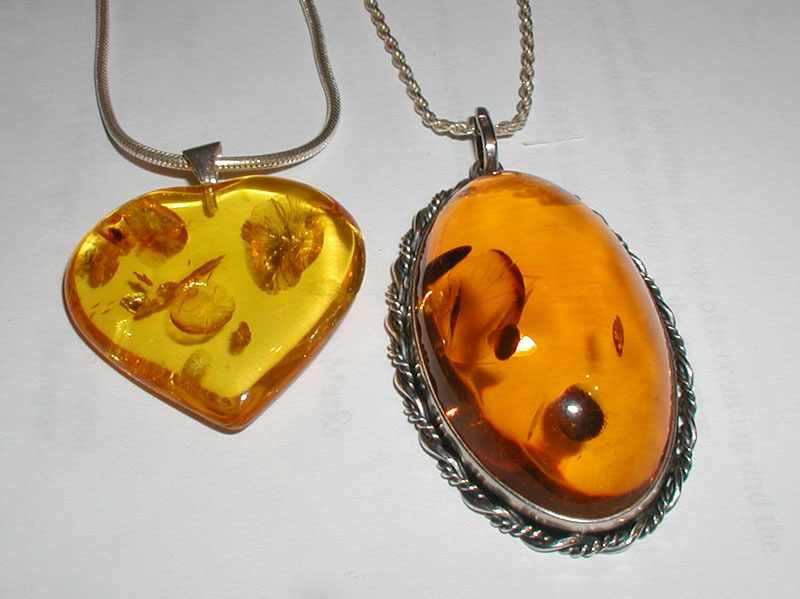
Pendants made of amber. The oval pendant is 52 by 32 mm (2 by 1 1/4 in).

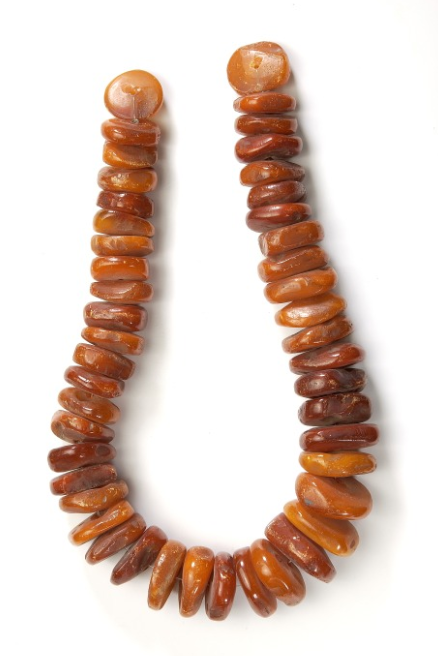
Amber necklace from 2000 to 1000 BCE

Amber has been used as jewelry since the Stone Age, from 13,000 years ago. Amber ornaments have been found in Mycenaean tombs and elsewhere across Europe. To this day it is used in the manufacture of smoking and glassblowing mouthpieces. Amber's place in culture and tradition lends it a tourism value; Palanga Amber Museum is dedicated to the fossilized resin.

=== Folk medicine ===
Amber necklaces are a European folk remedy for colic or teething pain, although there is no evidence they are effective and they cause considerable safety concerns. The American Academy of Pediatrics and the FDA have warned strongly against their use, as they present both a choking and a strangulation hazard.

=== Scent of amber and amber perfumery ===
In ancient China, it was customary to burn amber during large festivities. If amber is heated under the right conditions, oil of amber is produced, and in past times this was combined carefully with nitric acid to create "artificial musk" – a resin with a peculiar musky odor. Although when burned, amber does give off a characteristic "pinewood" fragrance, modern products, such as perfume, do not normally use actual amber because fossilized amber produces very little scent. In perfumery, scents referred to as "amber" are often created and patented to emulate the opulent golden warmth of the fossil.

The scent of amber was originally derived from emulating the scent of ambergris and/or the plant resin labdanum, but since sperm whales are endangered, the scent of amber is now largely derived from labdanum. The term "amber" is loosely used to describe a scent that is warm, musky, rich and honey-like, and also somewhat earthy. Benzoin is usually part of the recipe. Vanilla and cloves are sometimes used to enhance the aroma. "Amber" perfumes may be created using combinations of labdanum, benzoin resin, copal (a type of tree resin used in incense manufacture), vanilla, Dammara resin and/or synthetic materials.

In Arab Muslim tradition, popular scents include amber, jasmine, musk and oud (agarwood).

=== Refractory media ===
Goethe is documented as a rare user of amber, from which he cut lenses to visualize certain optical phenomena. Motivated by a manuscript sent to him by T. J. Seebeck in 1813 "on the reflection and refraction of light", he also conducted experiments on entoptic phenomena. Goethe attempted to replicate such phenomena on pieces of amber that he pierced himself. New evidence in 2026 showed that he held a small collection of 42 amber pieces. Of these, 40 were the subject of a detailed examination for bioinclusions in 2026, during which two nematoceran flies and an ant were found.

== Imitation substances ==
Young resins used as imitations:

- The copals (subfossil resins). The African and American (Colombia) copals from Leguminosae trees family (genus Hymenaea). Amber of the Dominican or Mexican type (Class I of fossil resins). Copals from Manilia (Indonesia) and from New Zealand from trees of the genus Agathis (family Araucariaceae)
- Other natural resins – cellulose or chitin, etc.

Plastics used as imitations:

- Stained glass (inorganic material) and other ceramic materials
- Celluloid
- Cellulose nitrate (first obtained in 1833) — a product of treatment of cellulose with nitration mixture.
- Acetylcellulose (no longer used)
- Galalith or "artificial horn" (condensation product of casein and formaldehyde), other trade names: Alladinite, Erinoid, Lactoid.
- Casein – a conjugated protein forming from the casein precursor – caseinogen.
- Resolane (phenolic resins or phenoplasts, not in the use at present)
- Bakelite resine (resol, phenolic resins), product from Africa are known under the misleading name "African amber".
- Carbamide resins – melamine, formaldehyde and urea-formaldehyde resins.
- Epoxy novolac (phenolic resins), unofficial name "antique amber", not in the use at present
- Polyesters (Polish amber imitation) with styrene. For example, unsaturated polyester resins (polymals) are produced by Chemical Industrial Works "Organika" in Sarzyna, Poland; estomal are produced by Laminopol firm. Polybern or sticked amber is artificial resins the curled chips are obtained, whereas in the case of amber – small scraps. "African amber" (polyester, synacryl is then probably other name of the same resine) are produced by Reichhold firm; Styresol trade mark or alkid resin (used in Russia, Reichhold, Inc. patent, 1948.
- Polyethylene
- Epoxy resins
- Polystyrene and polystyrene-like polymers (vinyl polymers).
- The resins of acrylic type (vinyl polymers), especially polymethyl methacrylate PMMA (trade mark Plexiglass, metaplex).

== See also ==
- Ammolite
- Illyrian amber jewellery
- List of types of amber
- Petrified wood
- Pearl
- Poly(methyl methacrylate)
- Precious coral

== Sources ==
- This article incorporates text from a publication now in the public domain: Rudler, Frederick William (1911). "Amber". In Chisholm, Hugh (ed.). Encyclopædia Britannica. Vol. 1 (11th ed.). Cambridge University Press. pp. 792–794.
- Kostyashova, Z. V., ed. (27 June 2013). Amber and its imitations. Kaliningrad: Ministry of Culture of the Kaliningrad Region, Kaliningrad Regional Amber Museum. ISBN 978-5-903920-26-6. Proceedings of the international scientific and practical conference, June 27, 2013
  - Bogdasarov, A. A.; Bogdasarov, M. A. "Forgery and simulations from amber". In Kostyashova (2013), pp. 35–37.
  - Matushevskaya, A. "Natural and artificial resins – chosen aspects of structure and properties". In Kostyashova (2013).
  - Wagner-Wysiecka, E. "Amber imitations through the eyes of a chemist". In Kostyashova (2013), pp. 29–34.
