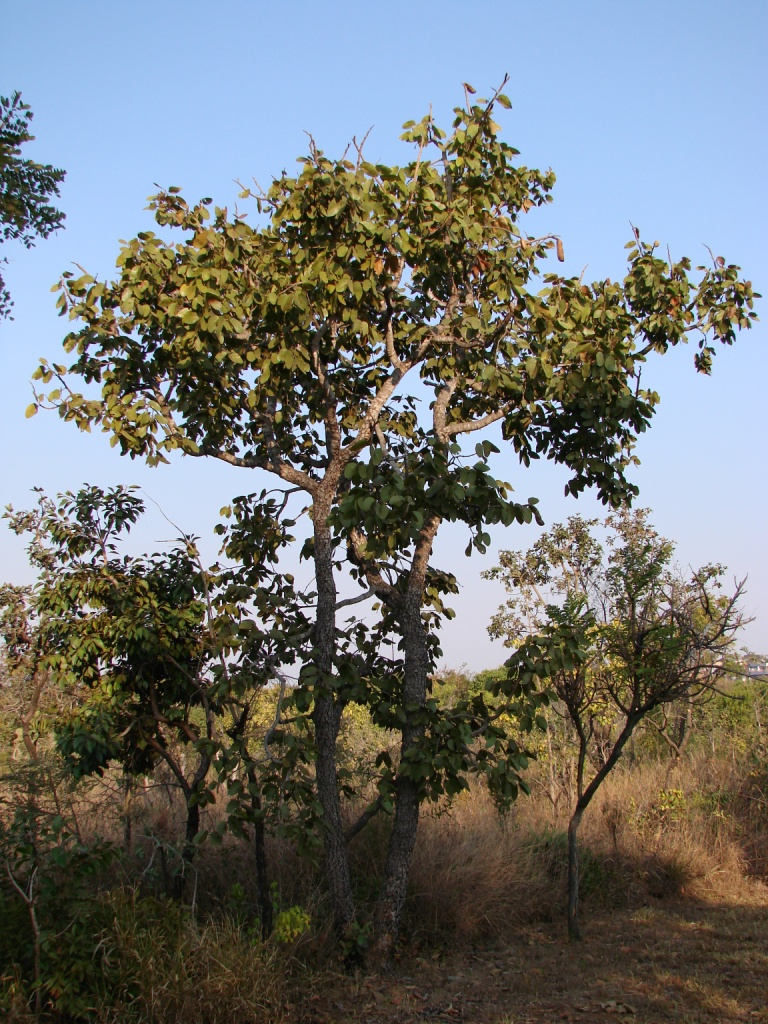
- Hymenaea stigonocarpa

Scientific classification
- Kingdom: Plantae
- Clade: Tracheophytes
- Clade: Angiosperms
- Clade: Eudicots
- Clade: Rosids
- Order: Fabales
- Family: Fabaceae
- Subfamily: Detarioideae
- Tribe: Detarieae
- Genus: Hymenaea; L.

Type species
- Hymenaea courbaril L. (1753)

Species
- See text

Synonyms
- Courbaril Mill. (1754); Tanroujou Juss. (1789); Trachylobium Hayne (1827); Valcarcelia Lag. (1828)

= Hymenaea =

Hymenaea Temporal range: Eocene–Holocene

Genus of legumes

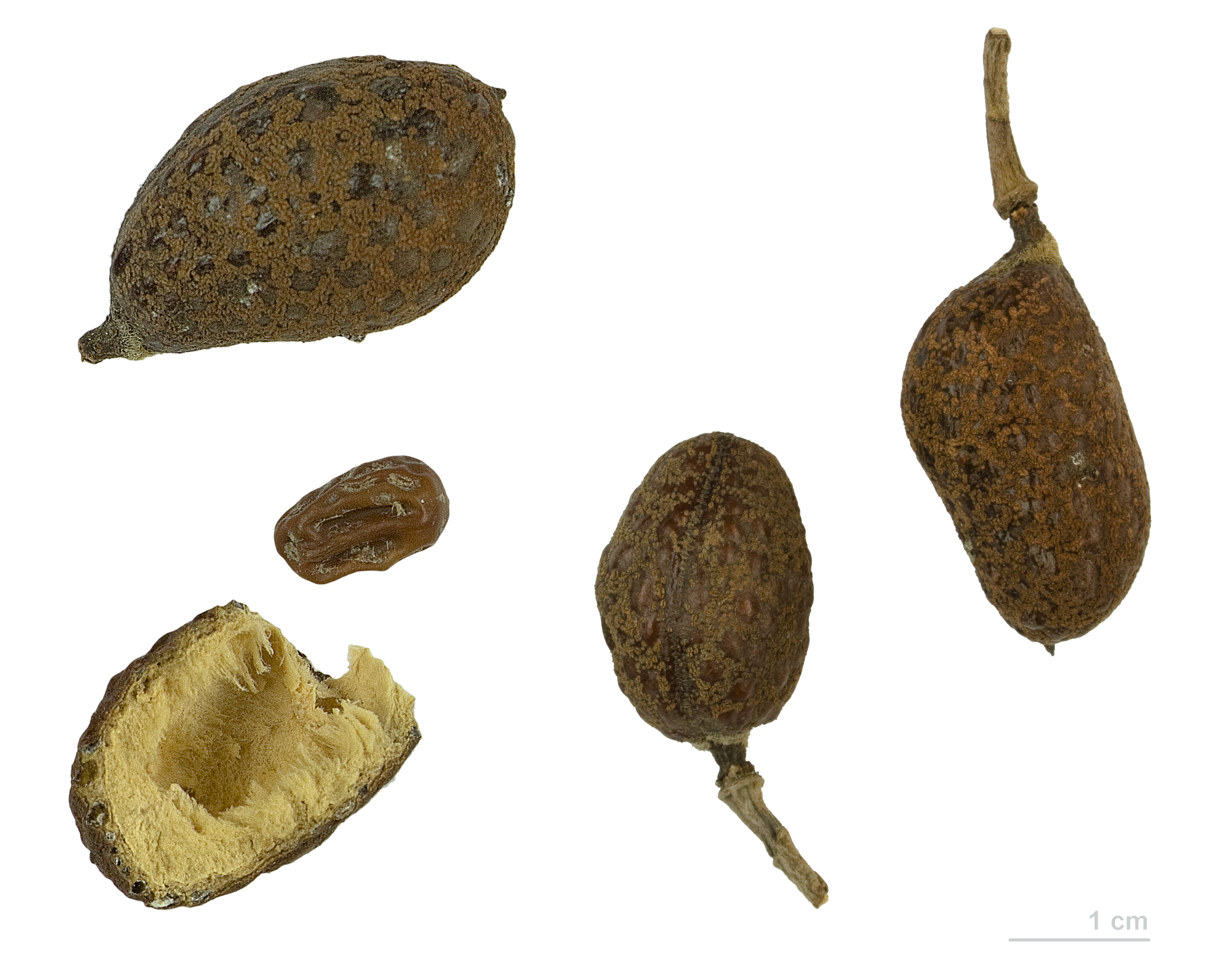
Fruits and seeds of Hymenaea verrucosa- MHNT

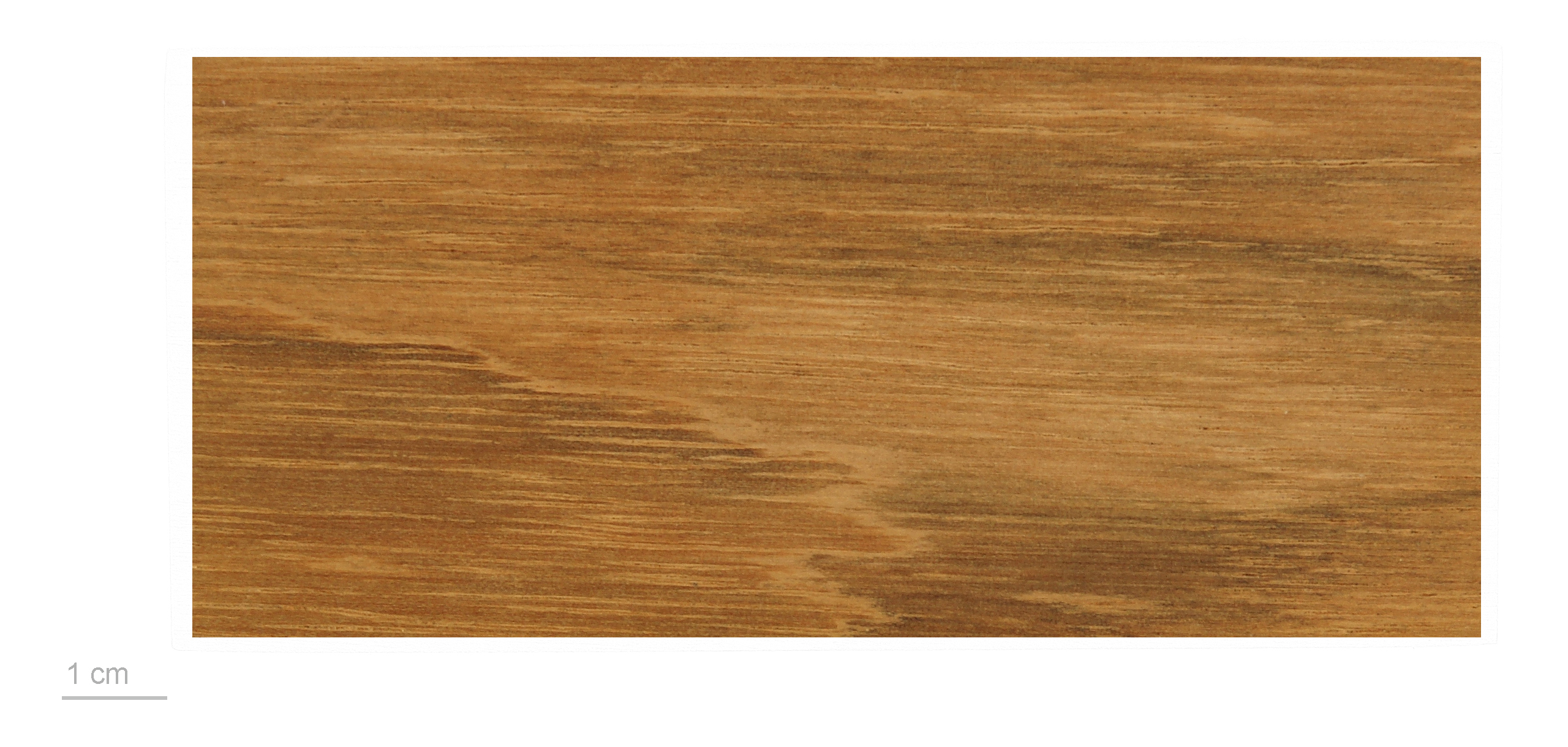
Hymenaea courbaril

Hymenaea is a genus of plants in the legume family Fabaceae. Of the fourteen living species in the genus, all but one are native to the tropics of the Americas, with one additional species (Hymenaea verrucosa) on the east coast of Africa. Some authors place the African species in a separate monotypic genus, Trachylobium. In the Neotropics, Hymenaea is distributed through the Caribbean islands, and from southern Mexico to Brazil. Linnaeus named the genus in 1753 in Species Plantarum for Hymenaios, the Greek god of marriage ceremonies. The name is a reference to the paired leaflets.

Most species of Hymenaea are large trees and they are primarily evergreen. They may grow to a height of 25 m (82 ft) and emerge above the forest canopy. Some species will grow both as tall forest trees and as smaller shrubby trees depending on their surrounding habitat. The leaves are pinnately bifoliolate, meaning that they have two leaflets attached to the sides of the petiole. The flowers grow in a panicle or corymb type of inflorescence.

== Uses and properties ==
The pulpy center of the fruits is edible and contains starch. The fruit is sold in local markets in the Americas. The leaves may be used to make a tea. The trees produce a dense wood used for timber in making ships and furniture. The thick bark of some species is used by indigenous peoples of the Amazon to make canoes. Seeds contain large amounts (40% of dry weight) of a highly viscous polysaccharide (xyloglucan) which can be used in several industrial sectors such as food, paper, cosmetic and pharmaceutical.

The trees also make hard resins that are used to manufacture varnish, especially the resin from Hymenaea courbaril (jatobá) in Brazil. The resin that is produced in Brazil is known as South American copal, and Hymenaea verrucosa is the source of the valuable Zanzibar copal. Resin may be collected from living trees, or from the soil near the place where a tree once stood. Throughout its American range, indigenous peoples use the resin for incense and as a cement. Resin from the extinct species Hymenaea protera is the source of Dominican amber, while the extinct Hymenaea mexicana produced the resin which is the source of Mexican amber.

Hymenaea courbaril has been used as a model organism to study the effect of increased CO_{2} concentration on the rate of photosynthesis in neotropical regions.

When the concentration of CO_{2} was increased from an ambient reference level of 360ppm to 720ppm, the photosynthetic CO_{2} assimilation in the seedlings doubled. This suggests the species could play an important role in greenhouse gas sequestration, as atmospheric CO_{2} is expected to reach ca. 700 ppm by the year 2075 if current levels of fossil fuel consumption are maintained.

Hymenaea courbaril is a very important species in programmes of recuperation of degraded rain forests in the Neotropics. It appears late in the natural regeneration process being classified as a 'late successional' or climax species.

== Species ==
22 species are accepted:

- †Hymenaea allendis
- Hymenaea altissima Ducke
- Hymenaea aurea Y.T.Lee & Langenh.
- Hymenaea cangaceira R.B.Pinto, Mansano & A.M.G.Azevedo
- Hymenaea courbaril L.
- Hymenaea eriogyne Benth.
- Hymenaea erythrocarpa R.B.Pinto, Mansano & A.M.G.Azevedo
- Hymenaea fariana R.D.Ribeiro, D.B.O.S.Cardoso & H.C.Lima
- Hymenaea intermedia Ducke
- Hymenaea jeaniana R.B.Pinto, Mansano & A.M.G.Azevedo
- Hymenaea longifolia (Benth.) I.M.Souza, Funch & L.P.Queiroz
- Hymenaea maranhensis Y.T.Lee & Langenh.
- Hymenaea martiana (Hayne) Hayne
- †Hymenaea mexicana
- Hymenaea oblongifolia Huber
- Hymenaea osanigraseminae Aguilar, Poveda & D.Santam.
- Hymenaea parvifolia Huber
- †Hymenaea protera
- Hymenaea reticulata Ducke
- Hymenaea rubriflora Ducke
- Hymenaea stigonocarpa Mart. ex Hayne
- Hymenaea torrei León
- Hymenaea travassosii Kuhlm. ex Paes
- Hymenaea velutina Ducke
- Hymenaea verrucosa Gaertn.

†Extinct

== See also ==
- Animé, an oleo-resin from Hymenaea species.
