= Retinite =

Retinite is resin, particularly from beds of brown coal which are near amber in appearance, but contain little or no succinic acid. It may conveniently serve as a generic name, since no two independent occurrences prove to be alike, and the indefinite multiplication of names, no one of them properly specific, is not to be desired.

Retinite resins contain no succinic acid and oxygen from 6% to 15%.

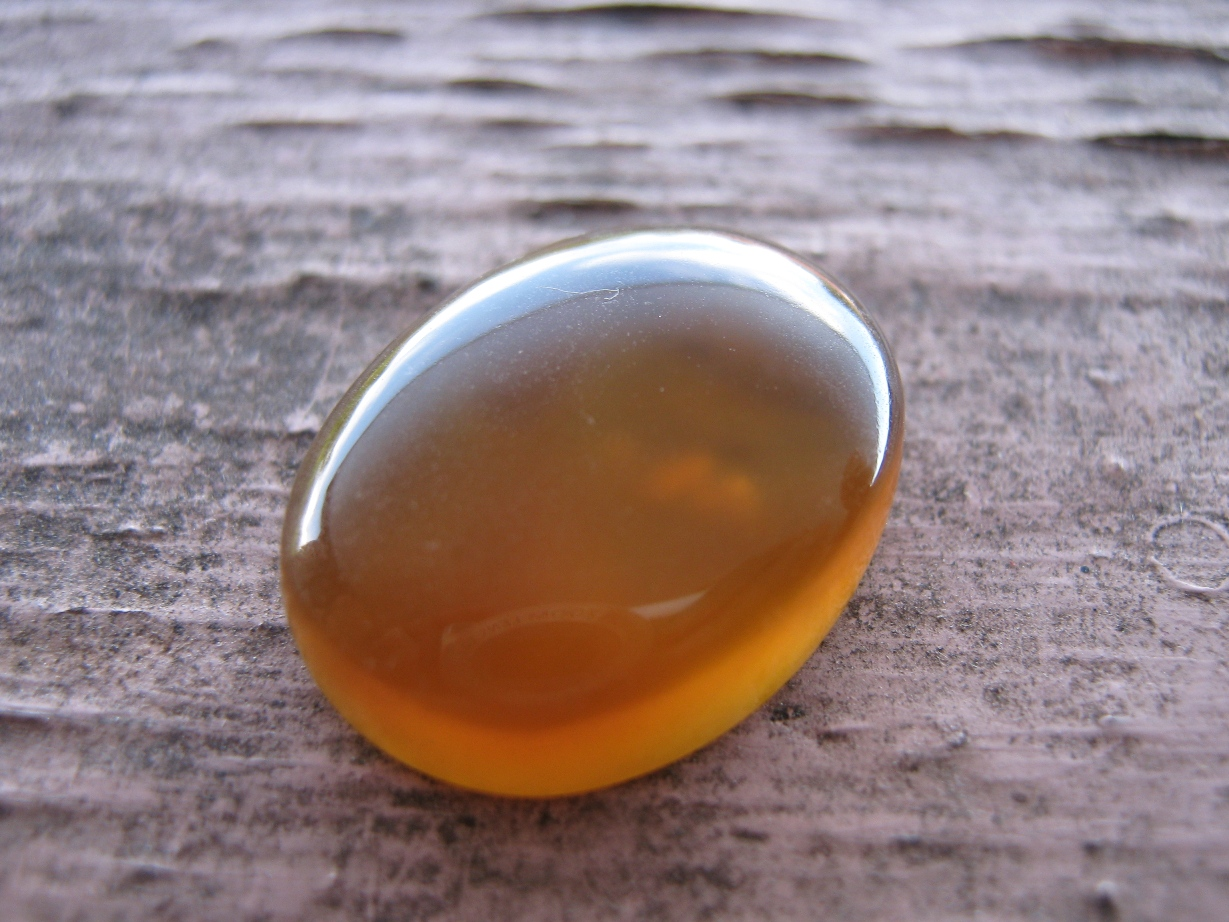
Polished Borneo retinite from Beradai Coal Mine, Merit-Pila, Sarawak, Malaysia
