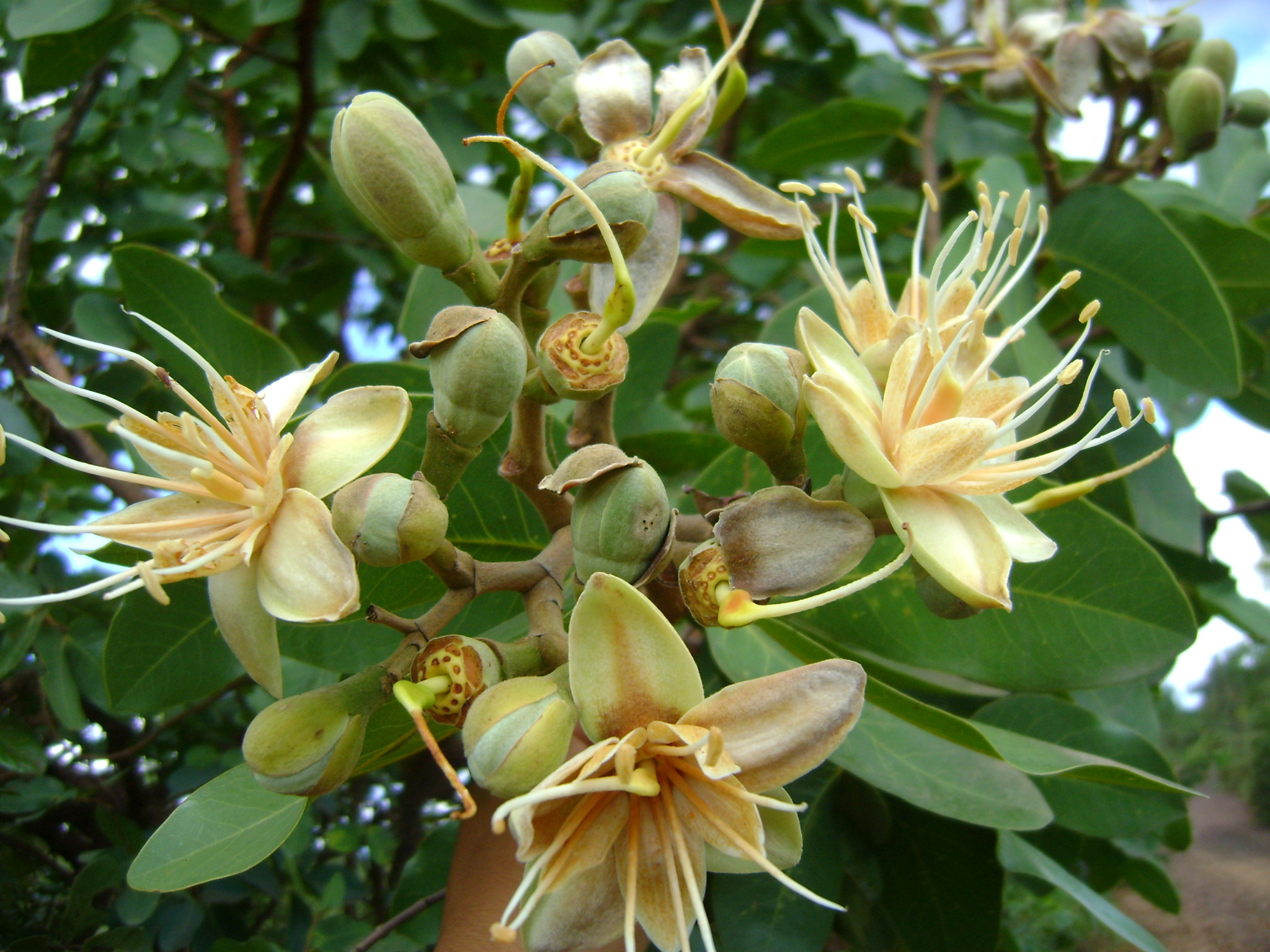

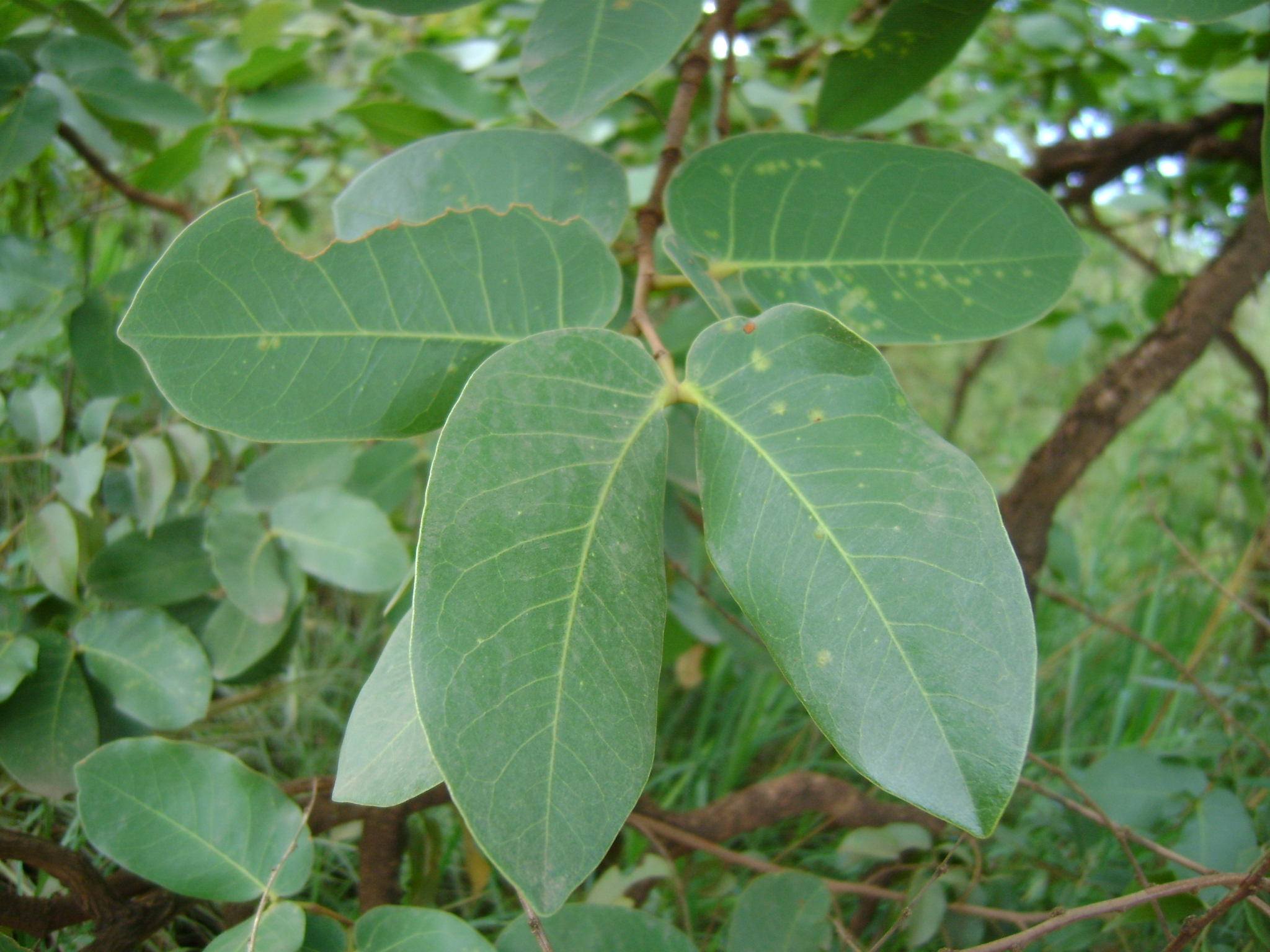

Scientific classification
- Kingdom: Plantae
- Clade: Tracheophytes
- Clade: Angiosperms
- Clade: Eudicots
- Clade: Rosids
- Order: Fabales
- Family: Fabaceae
- Genus: Hymenaea
- Species: H. stigonocarpa

Binomial name
- Hymenaea stigonocarpa Mart. ex Hayne, 1830

Subspecies
- Hymenaea stigocarpa subsp. stigocarpa; Hymenaea stigocarpa subsp. pubescens

Synonyms
- Hymenaea chapadensis; Hymenaea correana

= Hymenaea stigonocarpa =

Species of legume

Hymenaea stiginocarpa is an irregularly shaped, mostly 6–9 m (20–30 ft) high tree that has been assigned to the pea family. It has a twisted spindle-shaped trunk, a very rough grey bark, and reddish-brown twigs. The deciduous leaves consist of two large asymmetrical leaflets with an entire margin. The flowers occur in clusters of up to thirty at the end of the branches. It produces edible, highly appreciated fruits, which are often collected from the wild and used by local people. The vernacular name of this species in Brazil is jatobá do cerrado.

== Taxonomy ==
Friedrich Gottlob Hayne, a German botanist, first scientifically described this species in 1830 as Hymenaea stigonocarpa, a name that had been used before by Carl Friedrich Philipp von Martius, and was based on a specimen collected from a seasonally dry forest type, locally known as Caatinga, in the state of Piauí, north-eastern Brazil, during his 1817-1820 expedition. In 1870 however, George Bentham applied the name to specimens collected in the Cerrado of Central Brazil, and the name has since been used in association with specimens from the Cerrado. In addition he created the subspecies pubescens. João Barbosa Rodrigues, one of the most famous Brazilian botanists, in 1898 distinguished H. chapadensis, as well as H. correana, both of which were later considered synonyms of H. stigononcarpa subsp. pubescens. In 1925, Adolpho Ducke assigned the name Hymenaea velutina to specimens collected in north-eastern Brazil, which also became widely used for specimens from Caatinga. Recently, it has been established that the original material used to describe H. stigonocarpa belongs to the same species as the type of H. velutina. It has now been proposed to conserve the name H. velutina over H. stigonocarpa Hayne, and to continue applying H. stigonocarpa to the species from the Cerrado as used by Bentham.

== Description ==
Hymenaea stigonocarpa has twenty four chromosomes (2n=24). It is a low to medium height deciduous tree of 5–20 m (16–66 ft) and a diameter of up to 50 cm (20 in) at breast height. It has a twisted trunk covered by a thick rough grey bark and reddish-brown twigs. Its leaves are alternately set, and consist of two leathery, kidney-shaped to ovate leaflets of 6–24 cm (2.4–9.4 in) long and 3.5–7 cm (1.4–2.8 in) wide, with quickly falling bracts (so-called stipules) at their base. The flowers of this species are the largest in the genus, and the petals are somewhat larger than the sepals. The five sepals are thick and are deflected when the flowers have opened. The five white petals are approximately 22 mm (0.87 in) long and 12 mm (0.47 in) wide and are set on the edge of a broad hypanthium. Ten free, white, 40 mm (1.6 in) long filaments are tipped by 9 mm (0.35 in) long anthers. In the middle of the hypanthium is a single, fleshy carpel on a short, 6–8 mm (0.24–0.31 in) long stalk, which is tipped by a long curved white style implanted at an angle, with a bud-shaped wet grainy stigma at the tip. Up to thirty flowers are set in inflorescences at the tip of the branches, subtended by bracts. The species depends on cross-pollination and is pollinated mainly by bats. Self-fertilised flowers are aborted after a week. The ripe fruit is light to dark brown with small and regularly spaced light glands, dry, indehiscent, leathery legume of 9–20 cm (3.5–7.9 in) long, 2–6.5 cm (0.79–2.56 in) wide and 2–4.3 cm (0.79–1.69 in) thick, with a rounded base, a slightly pointed tip, and a straight or wavy margin. The mesocarp and endocarp have been transformed into yellowish, soft, fibrous, slightly sweet flour-rich pulp with a characteristic smell. A prominent suture line surrounds the entire legume. Fruits are ripe between April and July in the Federal District, July to November in Mato Grosso do Sul and August in Minas Gerais. It contains one to six seeds. These seeds are redish-brown, oval, side-ways compressed, 18–28 mm (0.71–1.10 in) long and 9–20 mm (0.35–0.79 in) thick, with rounded tip and base, an irregular surface and some depressions. Overly ripe fruits emit an unpleasant smell.

== Ecology ==
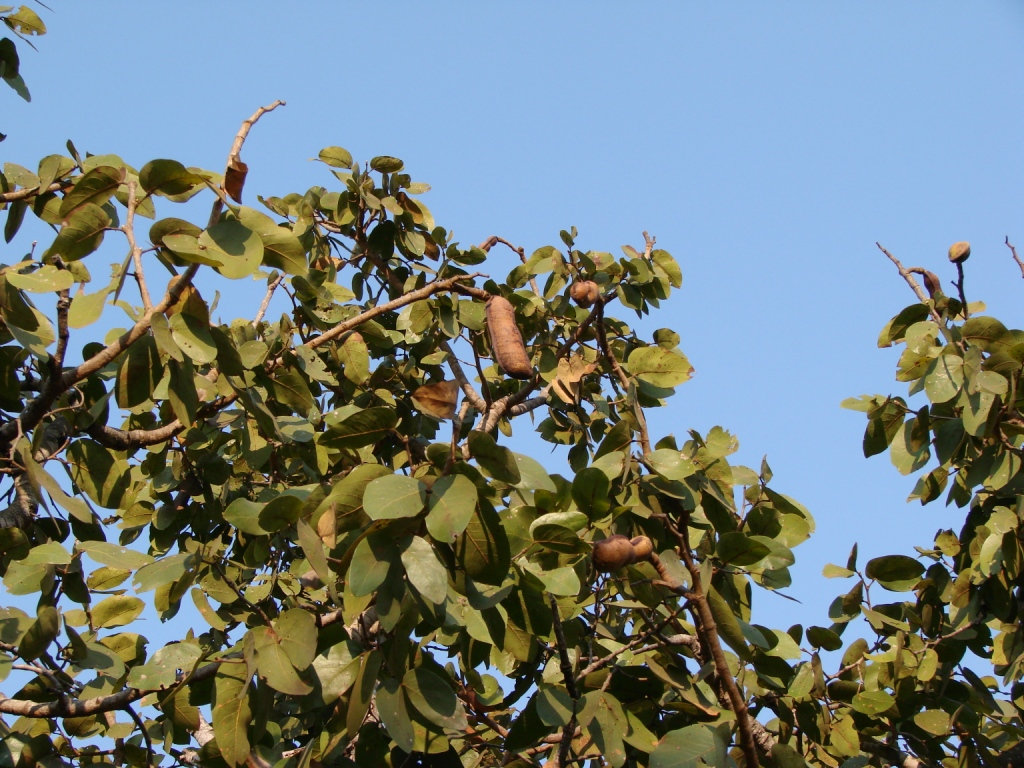
Tree with ripe fruits

The nectar-rich flowers of Hymenaea stiginocarpa open at night and are pollinated by several bat species, among which are the mostly fruit-eating Platyrhinus lineatus and Carollia perspicilata and the nectar specialist Glossophaga soricina. Hawkmoths also frequent the flowers, but seem ineffective in pollinating them. Self-pollinated seeds do not fully mature. Although the flower’s own pollen grains grow tubes and fertilise ovules as successfully as pollen from a different specimen, after seven or eight days the self-pollinated fruits fall from the tree. The mechanism to abort self-pollinated fruits is not known, but cross-fertilised ovules grow faster from the start.

By producing annually large amounts of fruits that are consumed by terrestrial fauna, the species also plays an important ecological role. It has been suggested that the agouti is responsible for most of the seed dispersal of H. stigonocarpa.

Unlike many other species of the family Fabaceae, Hymenaea stiginocarpa is said to lack symbiontic soil bacteria, and therefore is unable to directly use the nitrate made by the bacteria from atmospheric nitrogen.

== Distribution ==
Hymenaea stiginocarpa occurs in northern, central, and eastern Brazil and in Paraguay.

== Uses ==
Jatobá do cerrado is an important tree for the people of the Brazilian Cerrado, and it represents a substantial economic value with its high quality wood, resin and edible fruits. These fruits can be used to produce flour and in the preparation of different types of food. With the increasing demand for the products of this plant, there is a need for commercial cultivation and for growing high quality seedlings.

Jatobá fruit pulp contains about 5½% protein, and almost 50% high-fibre flour consisting of 40% non-soluble fibre and about 9% soluble fibre.

Basic nutritional components, vitamins and minerals of Jatobá do cerrado fruit pulp

Major Components	Percentage	Vitamins	Content per 100 g	Minerals	Content per 100 g
oil	3% – 5%	β-carotene (vitamin A)	0.3 – 0.5 mg	potassium	1120 mg
proteins	5% – 6%	folic acid (vitamin B9)	49 – 58 μg	magnesium	125 mg
carbohydrates	31% – 37%	ascorbic acid (vitamin C)	7 – 11 mg	calcium	134 mg
crude fiber	42% – 47%	α-tocopherol (vitamin E)	399 – 480 μg	phosphorus	96 mg
ash	3½%			zinc	1.4 mg
moisture	8% – 10%	energy	193.0 kcal	sodium	7 mg

The flour made from jatobá is appreciated by the local people in the Cerrado and used to prepare jelly, liqueur, cakes, breads and porridge. The resin from the stems of jatobá do cerrado is used to polish canoes, and to produce varnishes.

Scholars showed a large variation in genetics between and within subpopulations that corresponds to variability in the weight of the fruit, and this provides perspective for breeding varieties with more favourable traits for human use. Seedlings can be grown in plastic bags with 50% shading, and do best in a mineral soil without organic compost and in a greenhouse. H. stigonocarpa grows best in a sunny spot and prefers well-drained soil. When established, the trees are somewhat resistant to drought. In general, it grows slowly. Jatobá do cerrado is sometimes planted as an ornamental.

One study showed that extracts of H. stigonocarpa suppressed cell division in onions, and this may imply that it contains some cytotoxic substance.
