= Hymenaea torrei =

Conservation status
- Endangered (IUCN 3.1)

Scientific classification
- Kingdom: Plantae
- Clade: Embryophytes
- Clade: Tracheophytes
- Clade: Spermatophytes
- Clade: Angiosperms
- Clade: Eudicots
- Clade: Rosids
- Order: Fabales
- Family: Fabaceae
- Genus: Hymenaea
- Species: H. torrei

Binomial name
- Hymenaea torrei León

Species of legume

Hymenaea torrei is a species of flowering in the legume family, Fabaceae. It is found only in Cuba. It is threatened by habitat loss.
