= Copal =

Tree resin

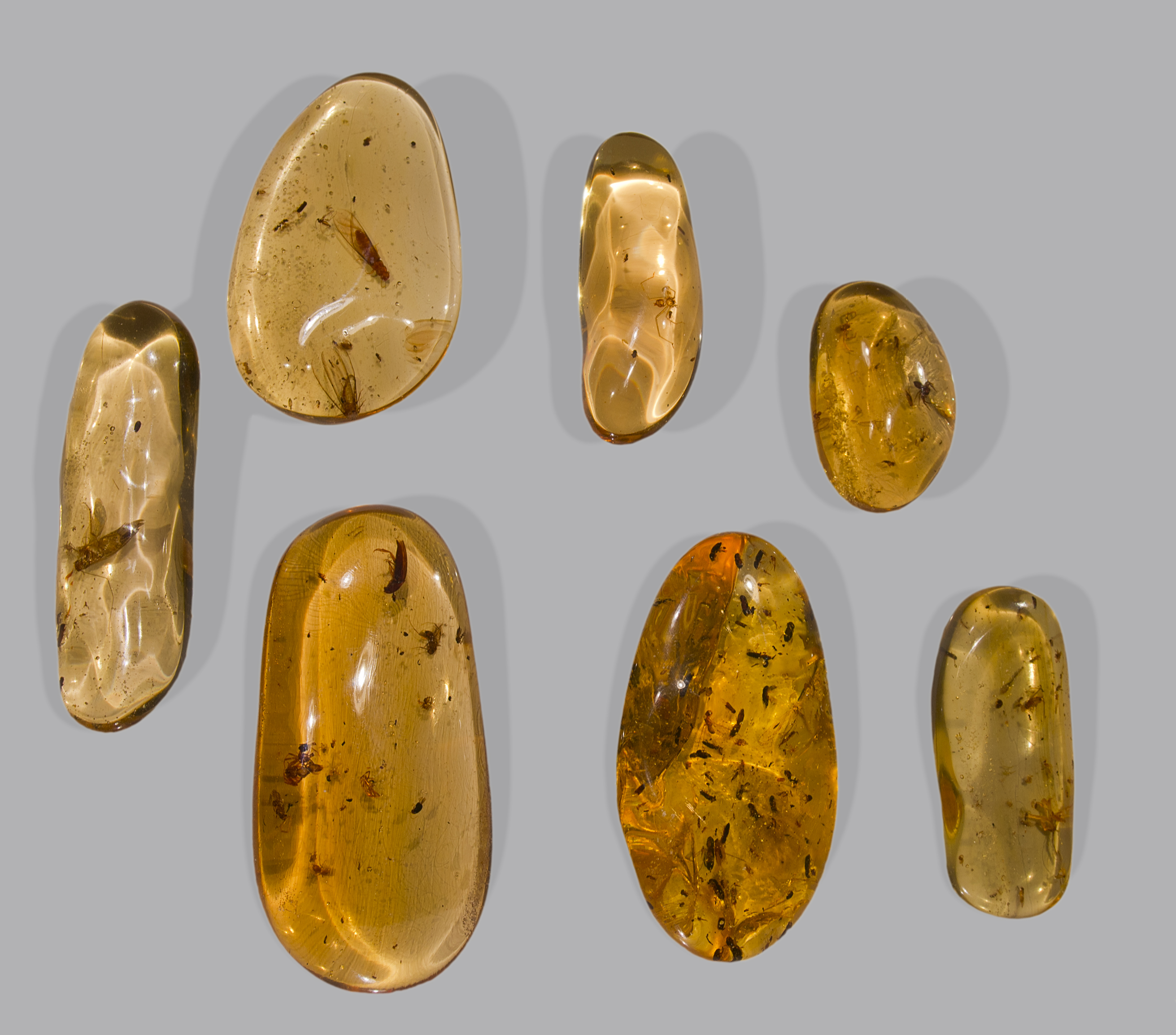
Copal from Madagascar with spiders, termites, ants, elateridae, hymenoptera, cockroach and a flower

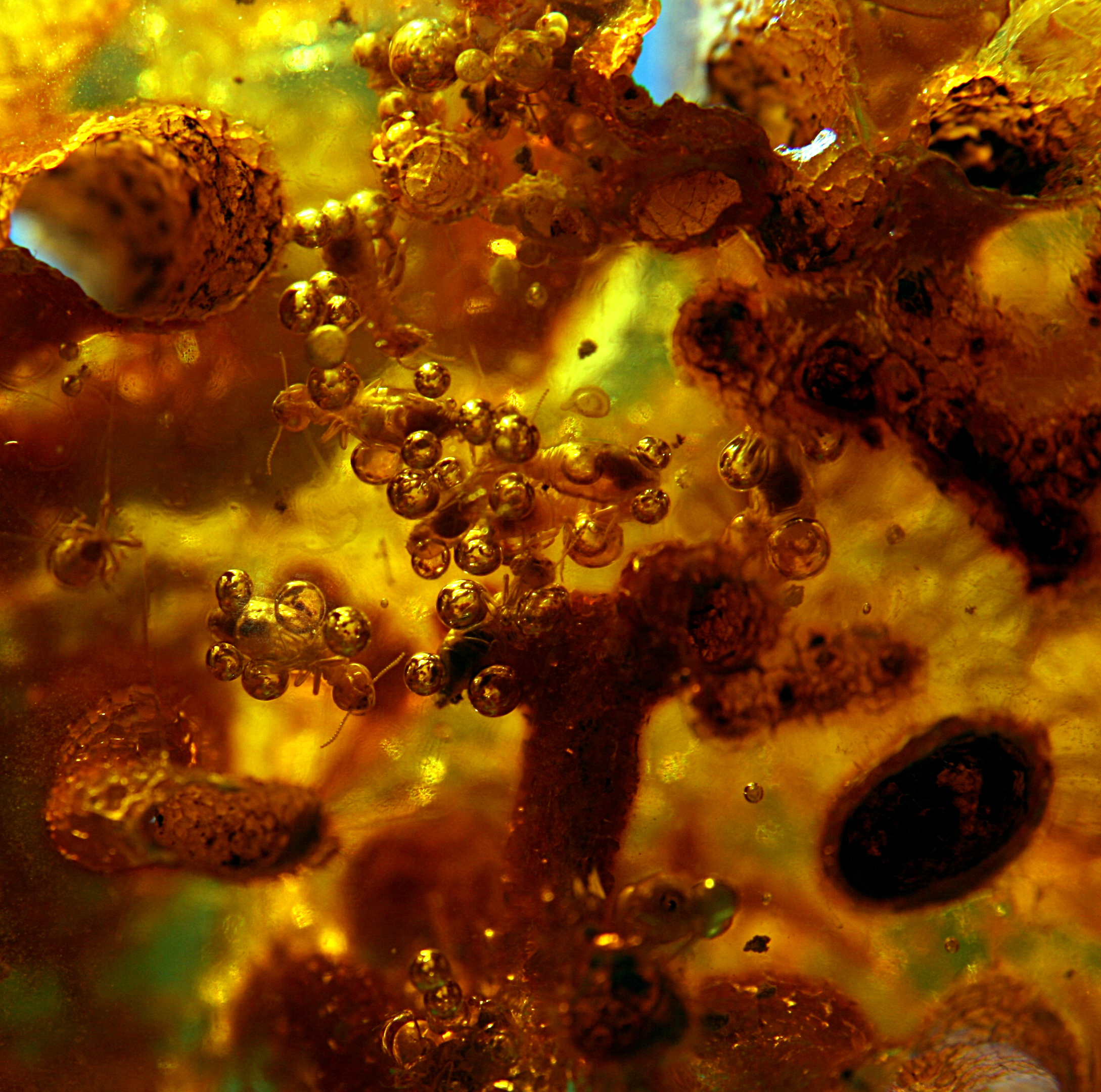
A sample of copal containing a few termites

Copal is a tree resin, particularly the aromatic resins from the copal tree Protium copal (Burseraceae) used by the cultures of pre-Columbian Mesoamerica as ceremonially burned incense and for other purposes. More generally, copal includes resinous substances in an intermediate stage of polymerization and hardening between "gummier" resins and amber. Copal that is partly mineralized is known as copaline.

It is available in different forms; the hard, amber-like yellow copal is a less expensive version, while the milky-white copal is more expensive.

== Etymology ==
The word "copal" is derived from the Nahuatl language word copalli, meaning "incense".

== History and uses ==
Subfossil copal is well known from New Zealand (kauri gum from Agathis australis (Araucariaceae)), Japan, the Dominican Republic, Colombia, and Madagascar. It often has inclusions and is sometimes sold as "young amber". When it is treated or enhanced in an autoclave (as is sometimes done to industrialized Baltic amber) it is used for jewelry. In its natural condition copal can be easily distinguished from old amber by its lighter citrine colour and its surface getting tacky with a drop of acetone or chloroform. Copal resin from Hymenaea verrucosa (Fabaceae) is found in East Africa and is used in incense. East Africa apparently had a higher amount of subfossil copal, which is found one or two meters below living copal trees, from roots of trees that may have lived thousands of years earlier. This subfossil copal produces a harder varnish.

By the 18th century, Europeans found it to be a valuable ingredient in making a good wood varnish. It became widely used in the manufacture of furniture and carriages. It was also sometimes used as a picture varnish. By the late 19th and early 20th century, varnish manufacturers in England and America were using it on train carriages, greatly swelling its demand. In 1859, Americans consumed 68% of the East African trade, which was controlled through the Sultan of Zanzibar, with Germany receiving 24%. The American Civil War and the creation of the Suez Canal led to Germany, India, and Hong Kong taking the majority by the end of that century.

Copal is still used by a number of indigenous peoples of Mexico and Central America as an incense, during sweat lodge ceremonies and sacred mushroom ceremonies.
