= Copaline =

Partly mineralized tree resin

Copaline (or copalite), also termed fossil resin or Highgate resin, is a naturally occurring organic substance found as irregular pieces of a pale yellow colour, for example in the London Clay at Highgate Hill. It has a resinous aromatic odour when freshly broken, volatilizes at a moderate temperature, and burns readily with a yellow, smoky flame, leaving scarcely any ash.

Copaline is copal that has been partly mineralised.
