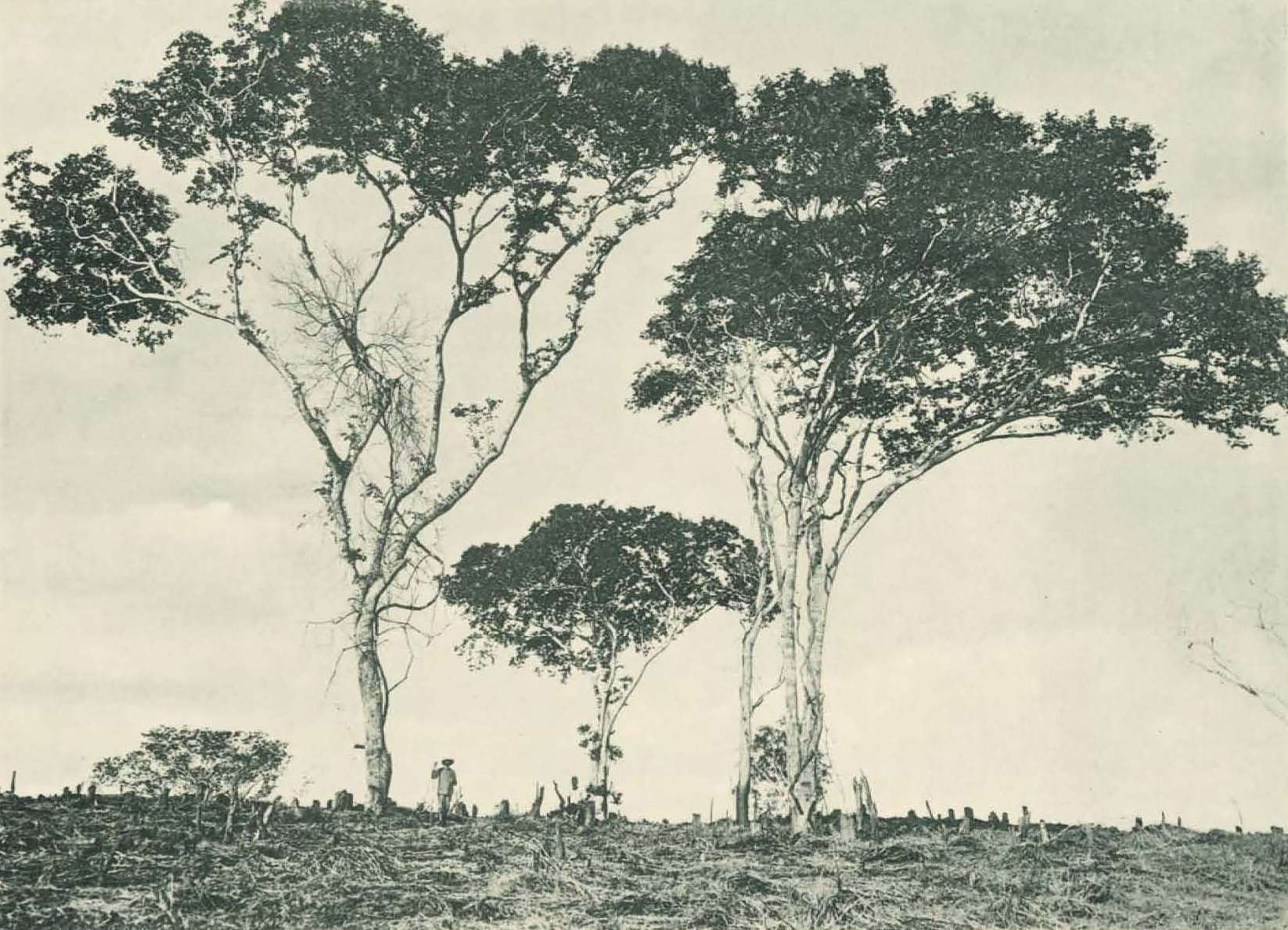

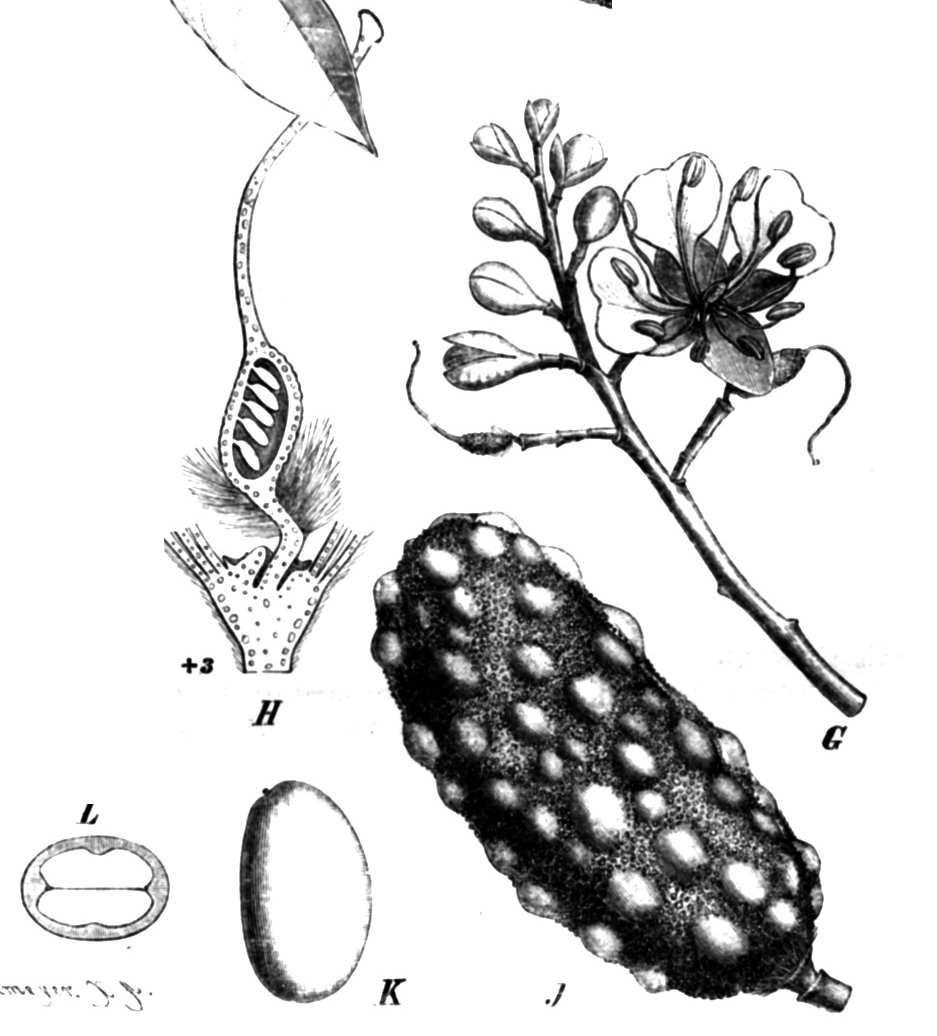

Scientific classification
- Kingdom: Plantae
- Clade: Tracheophytes
- Clade: Angiosperms
- Clade: Eudicots
- Clade: Rosids
- Order: Fabales
- Family: Fabaceae
- Genus: Hymenaea
- Species: H. verrucosa

Binomial name
- Hymenaea verrucosa Gaertn.

Synonyms
- Trachylobium gaertnerianum Hayne; Trachylobium hornemannianum Hayne; Trachylobium lamarckeanum Hayne; Trachylobium mossambicense Klotzsch; Trachylobium verrucosum (Gaertn.) Oliv.

= Hymenaea verrucosa =

Species of legume

Hymenaea verrucosa (commonly known as Zanzibar copal, East African copal, or amber tree) is a species of flowering plant in the legume family, Fabaceae. It belongs to the paraphyletic subfamily Caesalpinioideae. It is a large tree native to the tropical regions of East Africa and is cultivated in many tropical parts of the world. The species is currently treated as a species of Hymenaea, though a few authors isolate it into a separate monospecific genus Trachylobium as Trachylobium verrucosum. It has formerly also been called Trachylobium hornemannianum.

Copal resin from Hymenaea verrucosa is used in incense. By the 18th century, Europeans found it to be a valuable ingredient in making a good wood varnish, and it became widely used in the manufacture of furniture and carriages. It was also sometimes used as a picture varnish. By the late 19th and early 20th century, varnish manufacturers in England and America were using it on train carriages, greatly swelling its demand. In 1859, Americans consumed 68 percent of the East African trade, which was controlled through the Sultan of Zanzibar, with Germany receiving 24 percent. The American Civil War and the creation of the Suez Canal led to Germany, India and Hong Kong taking the majority by the end of that century.
