= Chondria elegans =

Scientific classification
- Kingdom: Animalia
- Phylum: Arthropoda
- Clade: Pancrustacea
- Class: Insecta
- Order: Coleoptera
- Suborder: Polyphaga
- Infraorder: Cucujiformia
- Family: Endomychidae
- Genus: Chondria
- Species: C. elegans

Binomial name
- Chondria elegans Strohecker, 1979

Species of beetle

Chondria elegans is a species of beetle in the genus Chondria, which is found in Malaysia.
