= Saula =

Saula can mean:

- Saula (fictional planet) in "An Attempt to Escape" ("Попытка к бегству") by Boris and Arkady Strugatsky
- Saula, Bangladesh, town in Bangladesh
- Saula, County Mayo, village in Ireland
- Saula, Estonia, village in Kose Parish, Harju County, Estonia
- Şaula, a village in Izvoru Crişului Commune, Cluj County, Romania
- Saula (beetle), a genus of beetles
