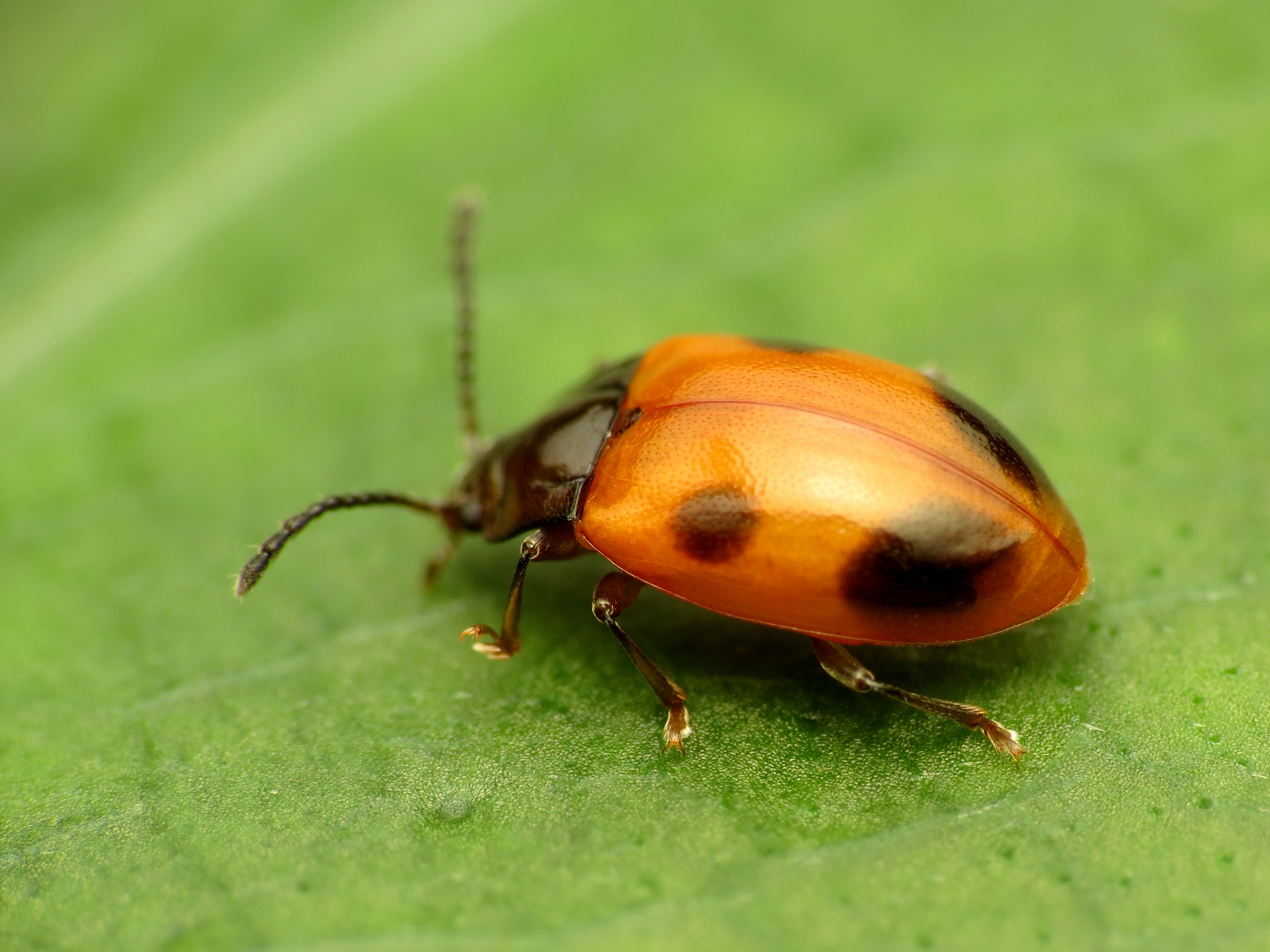
- Endomychus biguttatus

Scientific classification
- Kingdom: Animalia
- Phylum: Arthropoda
- Class: Insecta
- Order: Coleoptera
- Suborder: Polyphaga
- Infraorder: Cucujiformia
- Family: Endomychidae
- Subfamily: Endomychinae; Leach, 1815

Synonyms
- Stenotarsinae Chapuis, 1876

= Endomychinae =

Subfamily of beetles

Endomychinae is a subfamily of handsome fungus beetles in the family Endomychidae. There are at least 4 genera and about 19 described species in Endomychinae.

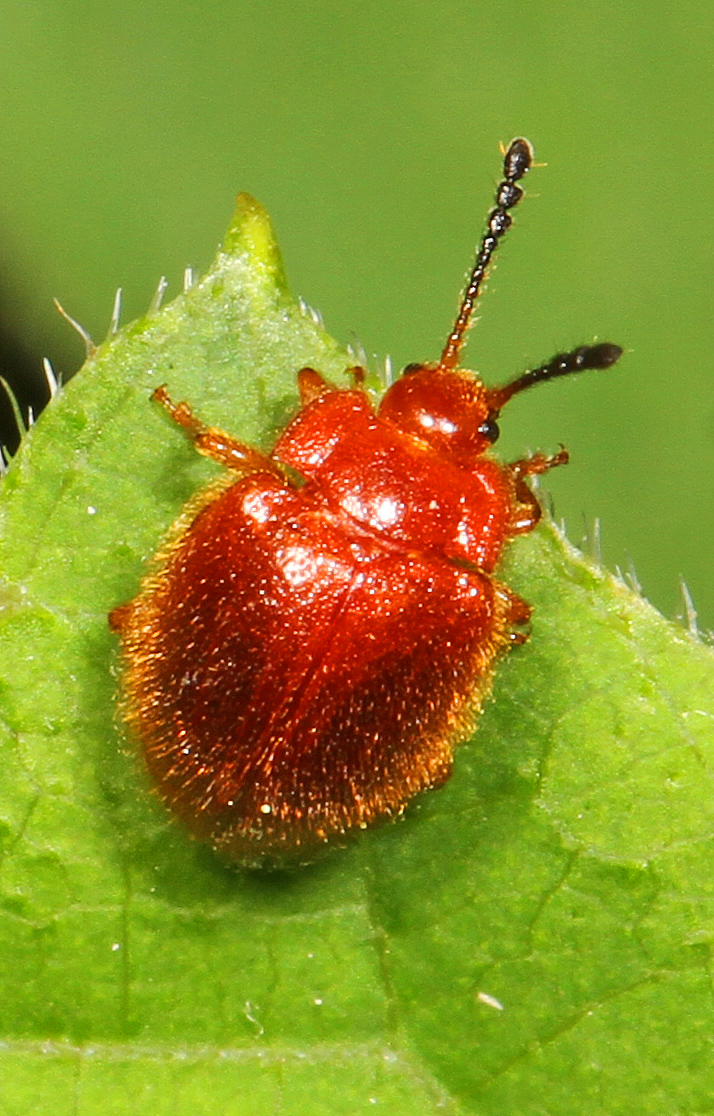
Stenotarsus blatchleyi

== Genera ==
- Danae Reiche, 1847
- Endomychus Panzer, 1795
- Saula Gerstaecker, 1858
- Stenotarsus Perty, 1832
