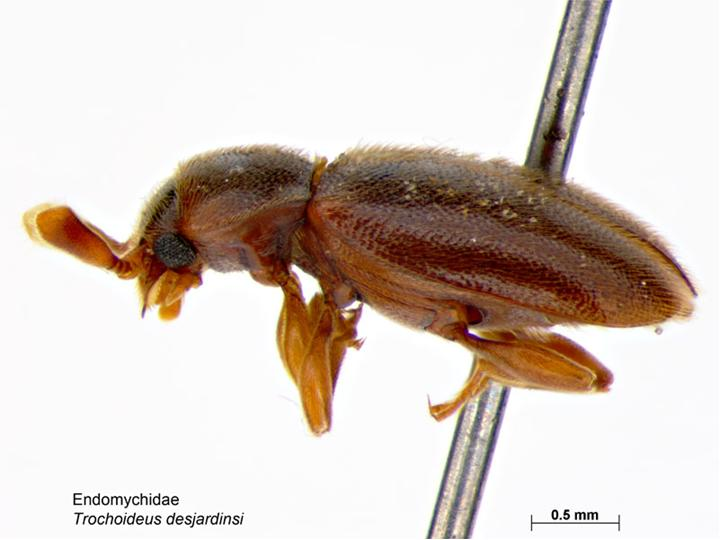

Scientific classification
- Kingdom: Animalia
- Phylum: Arthropoda
- Clade: Pancrustacea
- Class: Insecta
- Order: Coleoptera
- Suborder: Polyphaga
- Infraorder: Cucujiformia
- Family: Endomychidae
- Genus: Trochoideus
- Species: T. desjardinsi

Binomial name
- Trochoideus desjardinsi Guérin-Méneville, 1857

= Trochoideus desjardinsi =

Species of beetle

Trochoideus desjardinsi is a species of handsome fungus beetle in the family Endomychidae. It is found in Africa, North America, and Southern Asia.

== Distribution ==
The species is widely distributed in many Pacific and Indian islands and mainlands such as Andaman Islands, Borneo, Fiji, India, Java, Madagascar, Malay Peninsula, the Mascarene Islands, Myanmar, New Guinea, the Philippines, Samoa, Seychelles, Sri Lanka, Thailand. It is also introduced to Florida in the United States.

== Biology ==
They commonly inhabited in the dead leaves, in dead wood, and under bark. They are known to live in the nests of the ants Paratrechina longicornis and Anoplolepis longipes and termite species such as Macrotermes gilvus and Eurytermes ceylonicus. Adults are often collected from many economically important plants such as banana, in rotten papaya, in dead rachis of Angiopteris and rotting coconut husks. Adults are easily attracted to many light traps such as ethanol/turpentine traps, mercury vapor lights, black lights, and fluorescent light traps.
