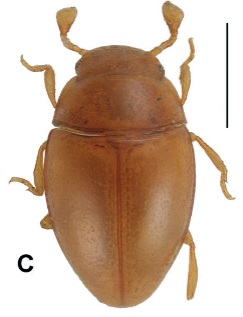

Scientific classification
- Kingdom: Animalia
- Phylum: Arthropoda
- Class: Insecta
- Order: Coleoptera
- Suborder: Polyphaga
- Infraorder: Cucujiformia
- Family: Endomychidae
- Genus: Displotera
- Species: D. beloni

Binomial name
- Displotera beloni (Wasmann, 1899)

Synonyms
- Coluocera beloni Wasmann, 1899; Cholovocera brevicornis Johnson, 1977

= Displotera beloni =

Species of beetle

Displotera beloni is a species of beetle of the family Endomychidae. It is found in India.

== Description ==
Adults reach a length of about 1.2–1.25 mm and have a reddish-yellow colour.

== Biology ==
This species is associated with Pheidole sulcaticeps.
