= Epipocus gorhami =

Scientific classification
- Kingdom: Animalia
- Phylum: Arthropoda
- Class: Insecta
- Order: Coleoptera
- Suborder: Polyphaga
- Infraorder: Cucujiformia
- Family: Endomychidae
- Genus: Epipocus
- Species: E. gorhami

Binomial name
- Epipocus gorhami Strohecker, 1977

Species of beetle

Epipocus gorhami is a species of handsome fungus beetle in the family Endomychidae. It is found in Central America and North America.
