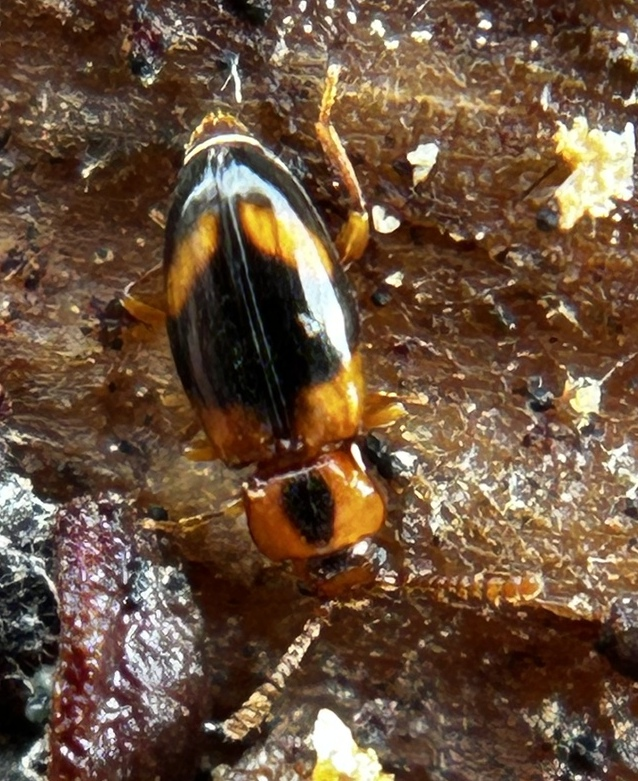

Scientific classification
- Domain: Eukaryota
- Kingdom: Animalia
- Phylum: Arthropoda
- Class: Insecta
- Order: Coleoptera
- Suborder: Polyphaga
- Infraorder: Cucujiformia
- Family: Endomychidae
- Genus: Phymaphora
- Species: P. californica

Binomial name
- Phymaphora californica Horn, 1880

= Phymaphora californica =

Species of beetle

Phymaphora californica is a species of handsome fungus beetle in the family Endomychidae. It is found in North America.
