= Chondria =

Chondria may refer to:

- Chondria (alga), a red alga genus in the family Rhodomelaceae
- Chondria (beetle), an insect genus in the family Endomychidae
