= Indalmus lachrymosus =

Scientific classification
- Kingdom: Animalia
- Phylum: Arthropoda
- Clade: Pancrustacea
- Class: Insecta
- Order: Coleoptera
- Suborder: Polyphaga
- Infraorder: Cucujiformia
- Family: Endomychidae
- Genus: Indalmus
- Species: I. lachrymosus

Binomial name
- Indalmus lachrymosus Arrow, 1925

Species of beetle

Indalmus lachrymosus is a species of handsome fungus beetle found in Sri Lanka.
