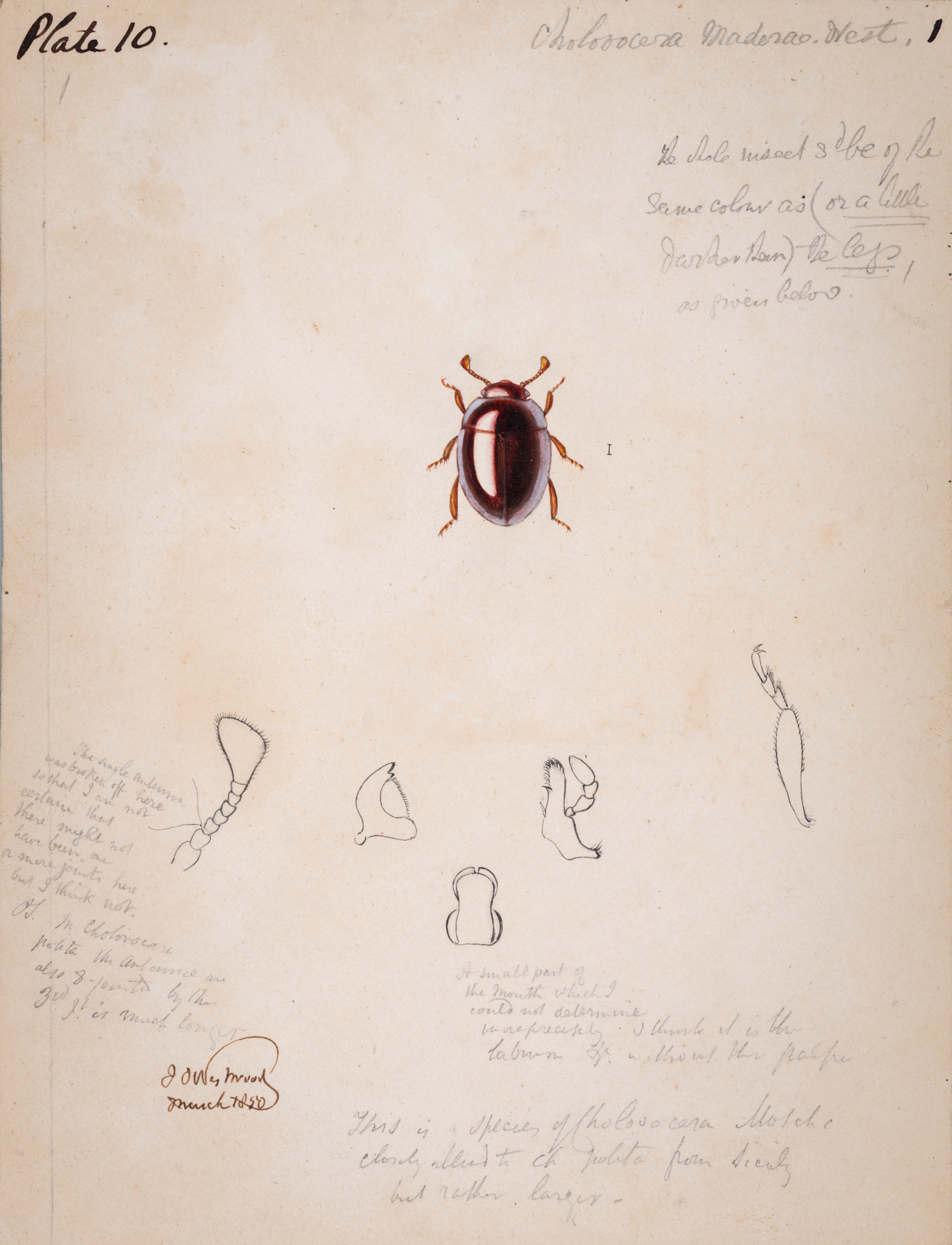

Scientific classification
- Kingdom: Animalia
- Phylum: Arthropoda
- Class: Insecta
- Order: Coleoptera
- Suborder: Polyphaga
- Infraorder: Cucujiformia
- Family: Endomychidae
- Genus: Displotera
- Species: D. maderae

Binomial name
- Displotera maderae (Wollaston, 1854)

Synonyms
- Cholovocera maderae Wollaston, 1854; Colovocerida maderae

= Displotera maderae =

Species of beetle

Displotera maderae is a species of beetle of the family Endomychidae. The species was described from a single specimen, collected on Madeira, but despite being first found on Madeira, the geographic origin of the species is unknown.

Since its description, the species has been recorded from several localities around the world, always associated with the longhorn crazy ant (Paratrechina longicornis), a pantropical invasive species, which appears to be responsible for the wide distribution of the beetle. Records for maderae include Trinidad, Pará in northern Brazil, India, Myanmar, Taiwan, Haiti, the Galápagos Islands and Hawaii.

Scientists believe that both the host-ant and the beetle have been dispersed by human activity.
