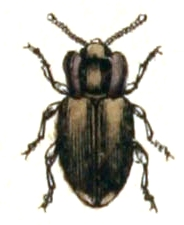

Scientific classification
- Kingdom: Animalia
- Phylum: Arthropoda
- Class: Insecta
- Order: Coleoptera
- Suborder: Polyphaga
- Infraorder: Cucujiformia
- Family: Endomychidae
- Genus: Lycoperdina
- Species: L. bovistae

Binomial name
- Lycoperdina bovistae Fabricius, 1792

= Lycoperdina bovistae =

Species of beetle

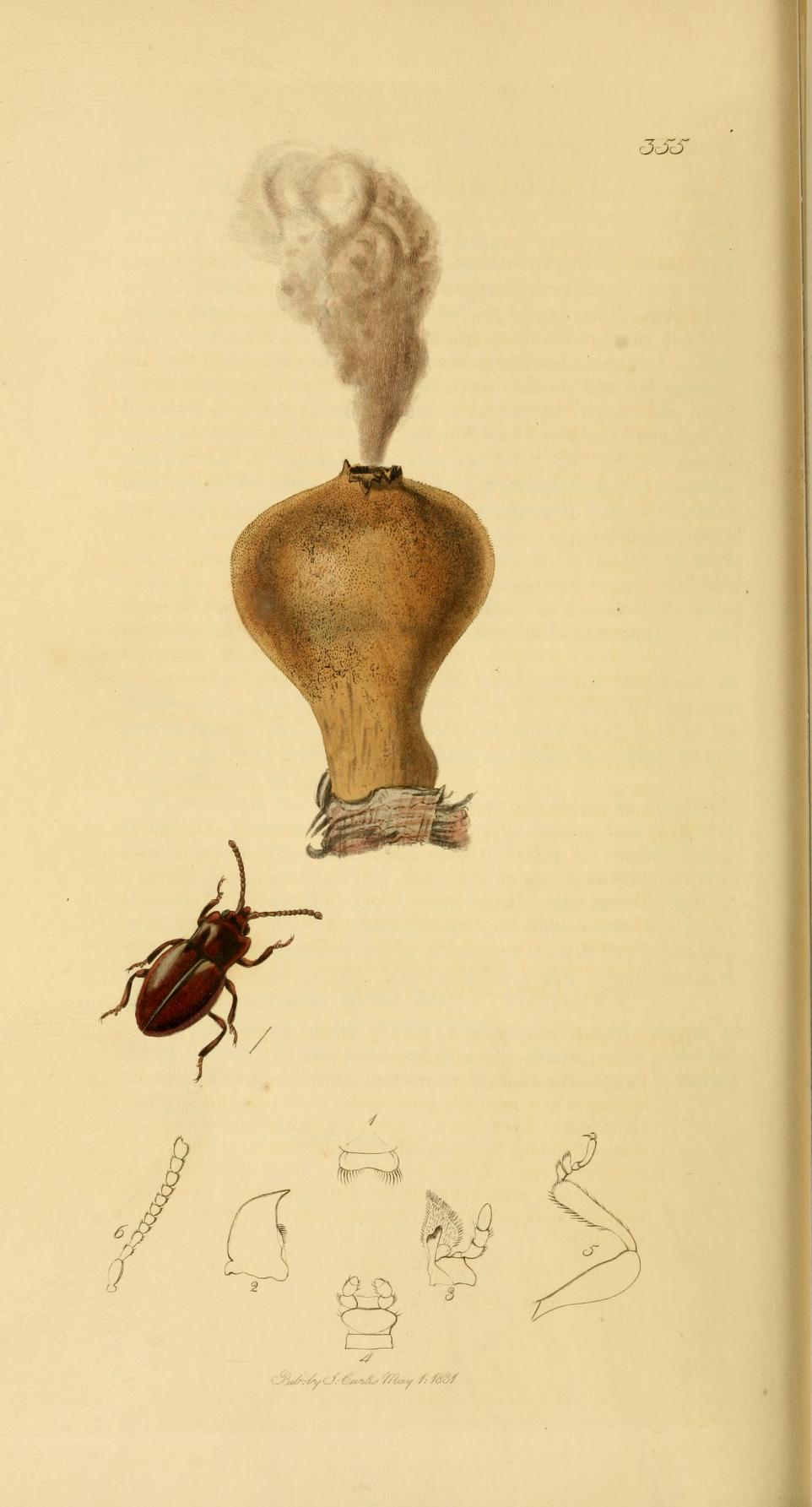
Lycoperdina and associated puffball mushroom

Lycoperdina bovistae is a rare species beetle found in Great Britain.

The species takes its name from the puffball genus of mushrooms Lycoperdon, inside of which these beetles have been found living and breeding. They can be found in other species of fungi as well. The species has been known since the late 1800s.

== See also ==
- List of beetle species of Great Britain
