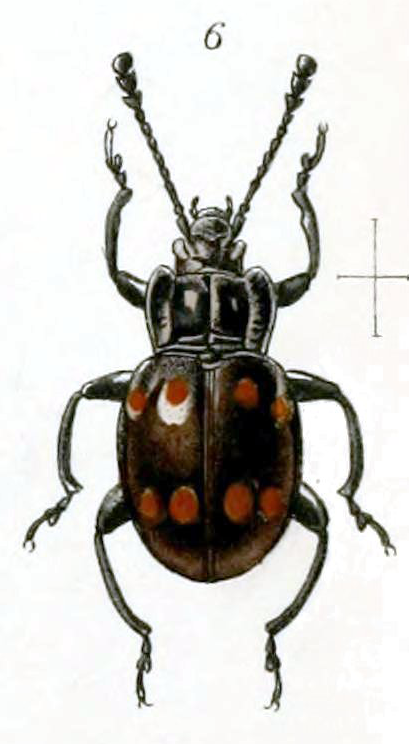

Scientific classification
- Kingdom: Animalia
- Phylum: Arthropoda
- Class: Insecta
- Order: Coleoptera
- Suborder: Polyphaga
- Infraorder: Cucujiformia
- Family: Endomychidae
- Genus: Stictomela
- Species: S. chrysomeloides

Binomial name
- Stictomela chrysomeloides Gorham, 1886

= Stictomela chrysomeloides =

Species of beetle

Stictomela chrysomeloides is a species of handsome fungus beetle found in Sri Lanka.

== Description ==
Typical length is about 9 mm. Head brassy black, with less shine. Antennae shiny and black with rather lax club and the apical joint obliquely compressed at the tips. Epistoma thickly and strongly punctured. Thorax with the surface shining but uneven. A central channel visible with a punctiform pit on each side in the middle. There is a basal transverse line, and the ordinary basal sulci. Humeral callus is raised into a blunt carina. There are two basal, orange, round spots. Femora clavate and distinctly punctured. Tibiae strongly bent in male. Tarsi and clams are pitchy, clothed with golden pile beneath.
