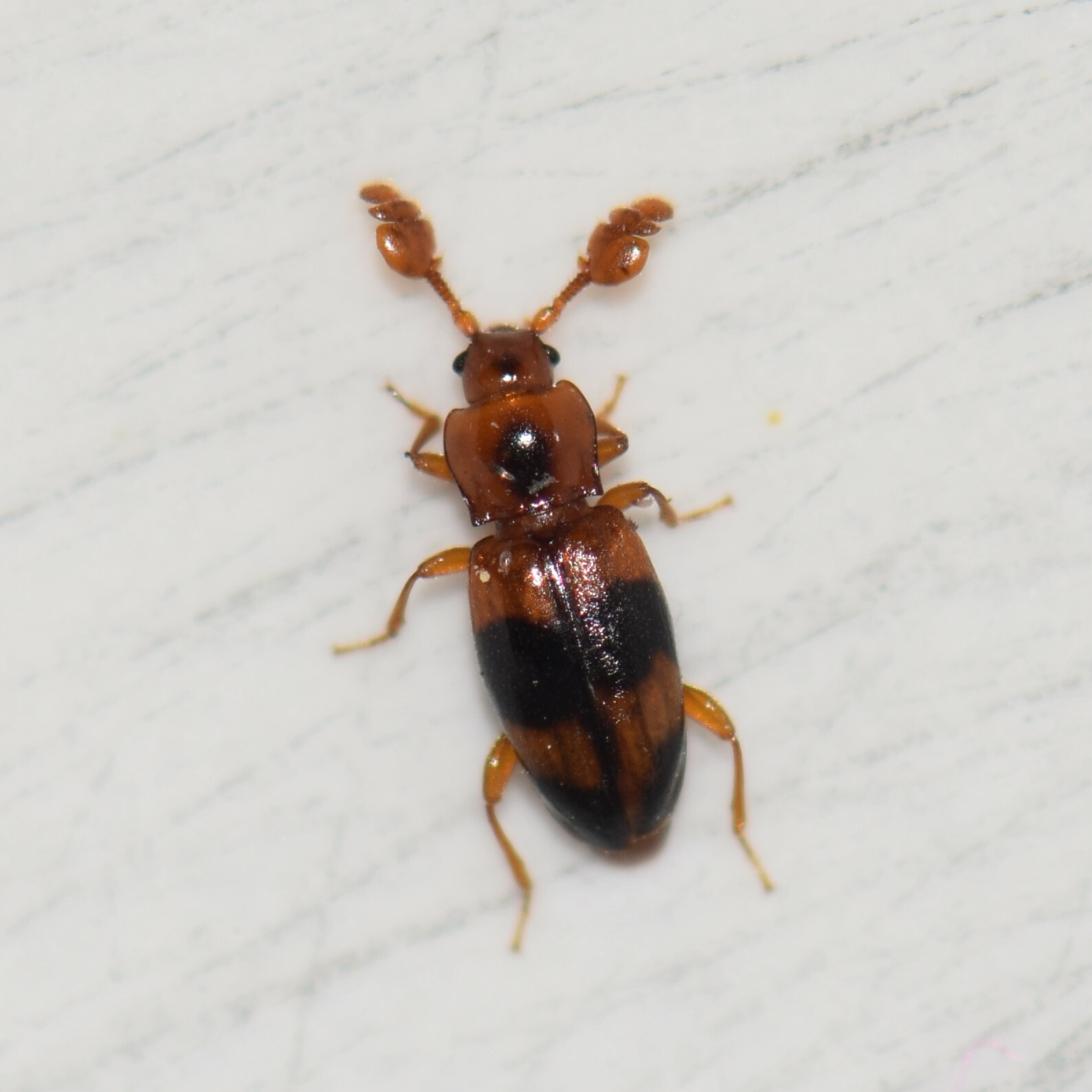

Scientific classification
- Kingdom: Animalia
- Phylum: Arthropoda
- Clade: Pancrustacea
- Class: Insecta
- Order: Coleoptera
- Suborder: Polyphaga
- Infraorder: Cucujiformia
- Family: Endomychidae
- Genus: Phymaphora
- Species: P. pulchella

Binomial name
- Phymaphora pulchella Newman, 1838

= Phymaphora pulchella =

Species of beetle

Phymaphora pulchella is a species of handsome fungus beetle in the family Endomychidae. It is found in North America.
