= Stictomela opulenta =

Scientific classification
- Kingdom: Animalia
- Phylum: Arthropoda
- Class: Insecta
- Order: Coleoptera
- Suborder: Polyphaga
- Infraorder: Cucujiformia
- Family: Endomychidae
- Genus: Stictomela
- Species: S. opulenta

Binomial name
- Stictomela opulenta Gorham, 1886

Species of beetle

Stictomela opulenta is a species of handsome fungus beetle found in Sri Lanka.

== Description ==
Typical length of male is about 10 mm. Head strongly and deeply punctured. Epistoma with fewer and more scattered punctures. Thorax uneven but shiny. There is a marginal line round the entire edge uniting with the central channel in front. Elytra thickly and distinctly punctured. Elytral shoulders with a well raised callus ending in a deep red spot. There is another spot near the scutellum, and another spot between shoulder and scutellum. There are two small oblong spots posteriorly near the suture about one third from the apex. Another spot is visible between these and the margin. Legs and ventrum black and shiny. Femora punctate, and fine.
