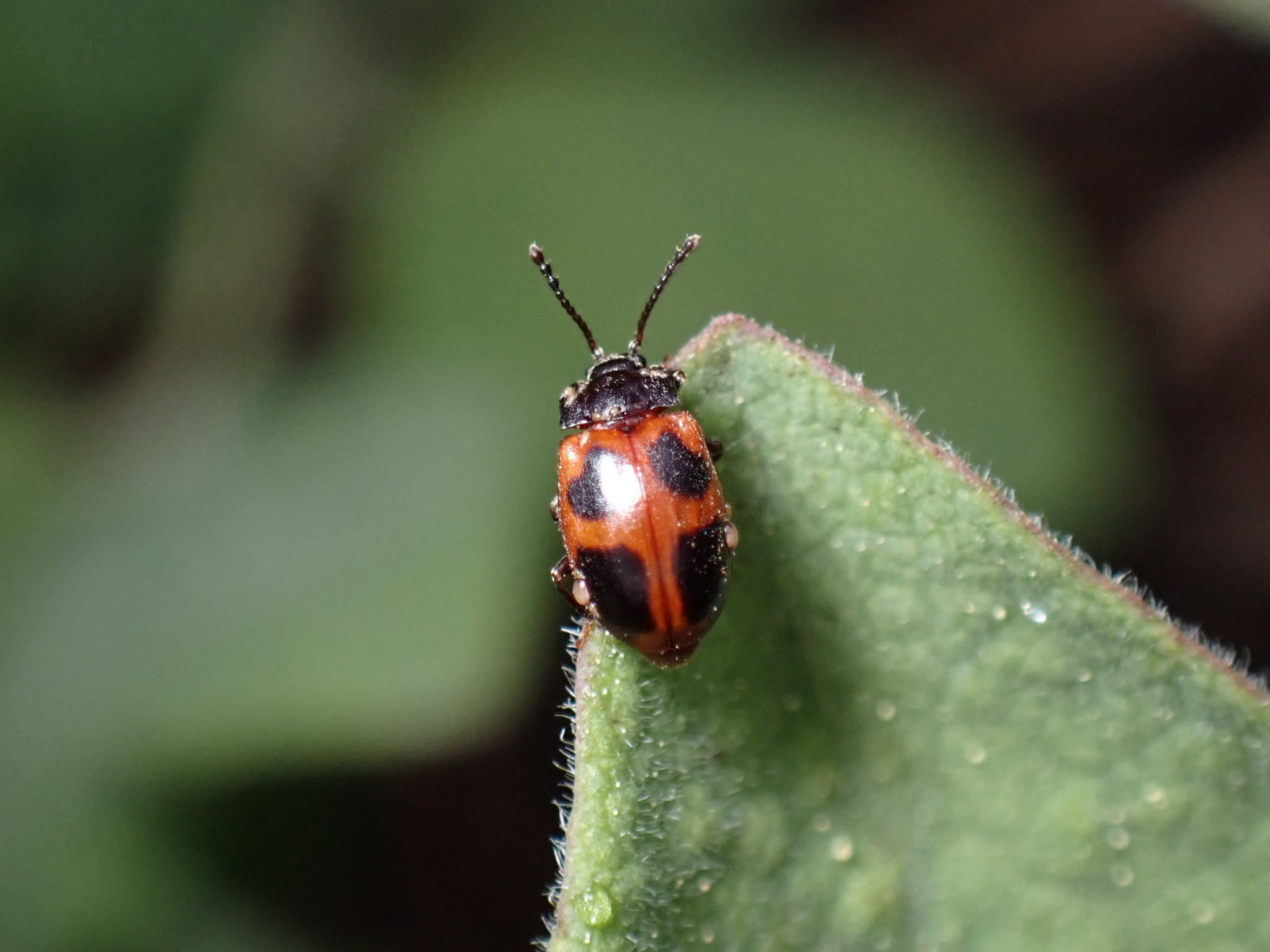

Scientific classification
- Kingdom: Animalia
- Phylum: Arthropoda
- Class: Insecta
- Order: Coleoptera
- Suborder: Polyphaga
- Infraorder: Cucujiformia
- Family: Endomychidae
- Genus: Endomychus
- Species: E. limbatus

Binomial name
- Endomychus limbatus (Horn, 1870)

= Endomychus limbatus =

Species of beetle

Endomychus limbatus is a species of handsome fungus beetle in the family Endomychidae, and is found in North America.
