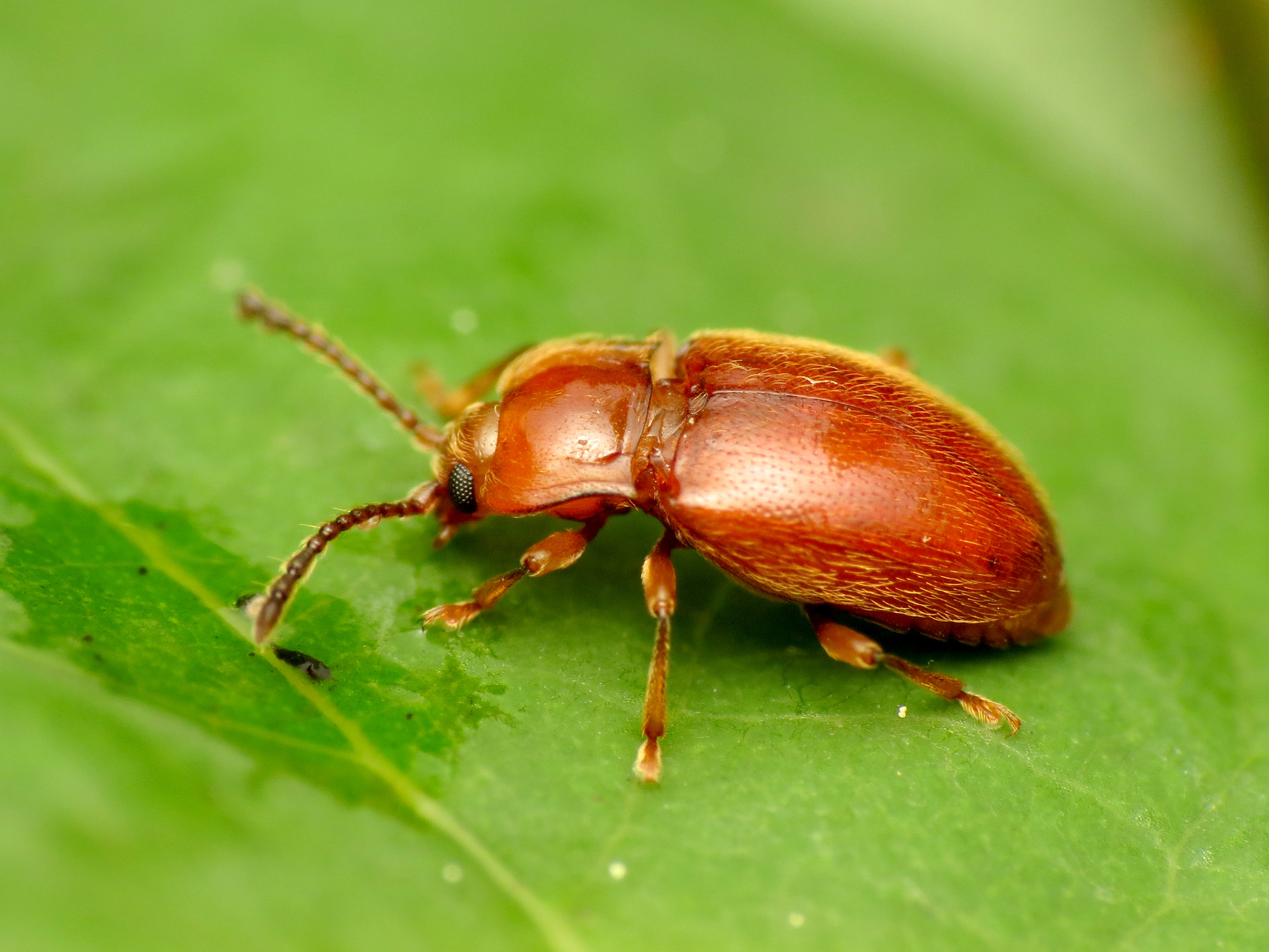
- Danae testacea

Scientific classification
- Kingdom: Animalia
- Phylum: Arthropoda
- Clade: Pancrustacea
- Class: Insecta
- Order: Coleoptera
- Suborder: Polyphaga
- Infraorder: Cucujiformia
- Family: Endomychidae
- Genus: Danae
- Species: D. testacea

Binomial name
- Danae testacea (Ziegler, 1845)

= Danae testacea =

Species of beetle

Danae testacea is a species of handsome fungus beetle in the family Endomychidae. It is found in North America.
