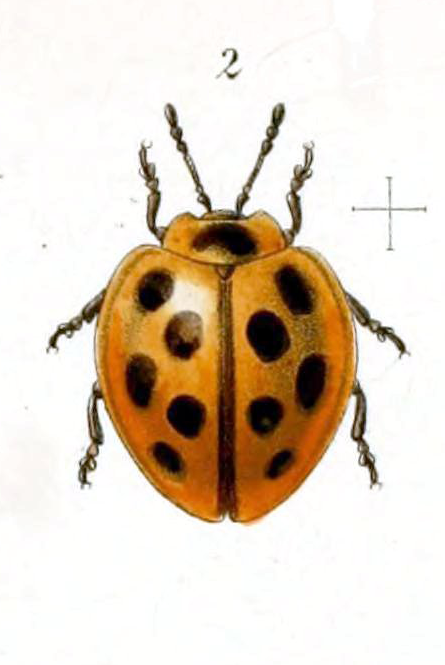

Scientific classification
- Kingdom: Animalia
- Phylum: Arthropoda
- Clade: Pancrustacea
- Class: Insecta
- Order: Coleoptera
- Suborder: Polyphaga
- Infraorder: Cucujiformia
- Family: Endomychidae
- Genus: Cyclotoma
- Species: C. cingalensis

Binomial name
- Cyclotoma cingalensis (Gorham, 1886)

Synonyms
- Panomaea cingalensis Gorham, 1886

= Cyclotoma cingalensis =

Species of beetle

Cyclotoma cingalensis is a species of handsome fungus beetle found in Sri Lanka.

== Description ==
This species has a length of about 3.9 to 5.4 mm.
