= Holoparamecus pacificus =

Scientific classification
- Kingdom: Animalia
- Phylum: Arthropoda
- Class: Insecta
- Order: Coleoptera
- Suborder: Polyphaga
- Infraorder: Cucujiformia
- Family: Endomychidae
- Genus: Holoparamecus
- Species: H. pacificus

Binomial name
- Holoparamecus pacificus LeConte, 1863

Species of beetle

Holoparamecus pacificus is a species of handsome fungus beetle in the family Endomychidae. It is found in North America.
