= Ancylopus ceylonicus =

Scientific classification
- Kingdom: Animalia
- Phylum: Arthropoda
- Clade: Pancrustacea
- Class: Insecta
- Order: Coleoptera
- Suborder: Polyphaga
- Infraorder: Cucujiformia
- Family: Endomychidae
- Genus: Ancylopus
- Species: A. ceylonicus

Binomial name
- Ancylopus ceylonicus Strohecker, 1974

Species of beetle

Ancylopus ceylonicus is a species of handsome fungus beetle found in India, and Sri Lanka.
