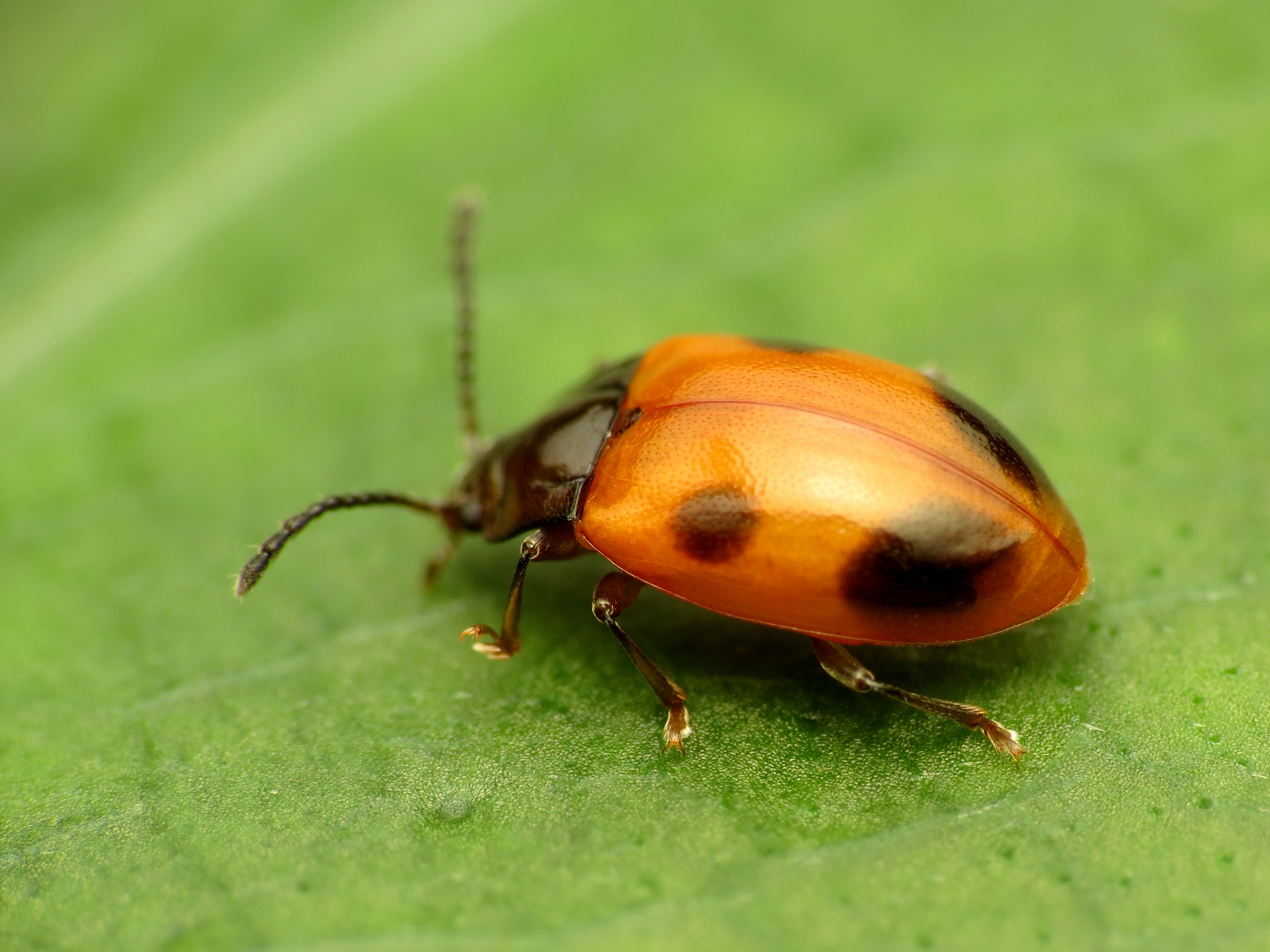

Scientific classification
- Kingdom: Animalia
- Phylum: Arthropoda
- Clade: Pancrustacea
- Class: Insecta
- Order: Coleoptera
- Suborder: Polyphaga
- Infraorder: Cucujiformia
- Family: Endomychidae
- Genus: Endomychus
- Species: E. biguttatus

Binomial name
- Endomychus biguttatus Say, 1824

= Endomychus biguttatus =

Species of beetle

Endomychus biguttatus is a species of handsome fungus beetle in the family Endomychidae. It is found in North America.

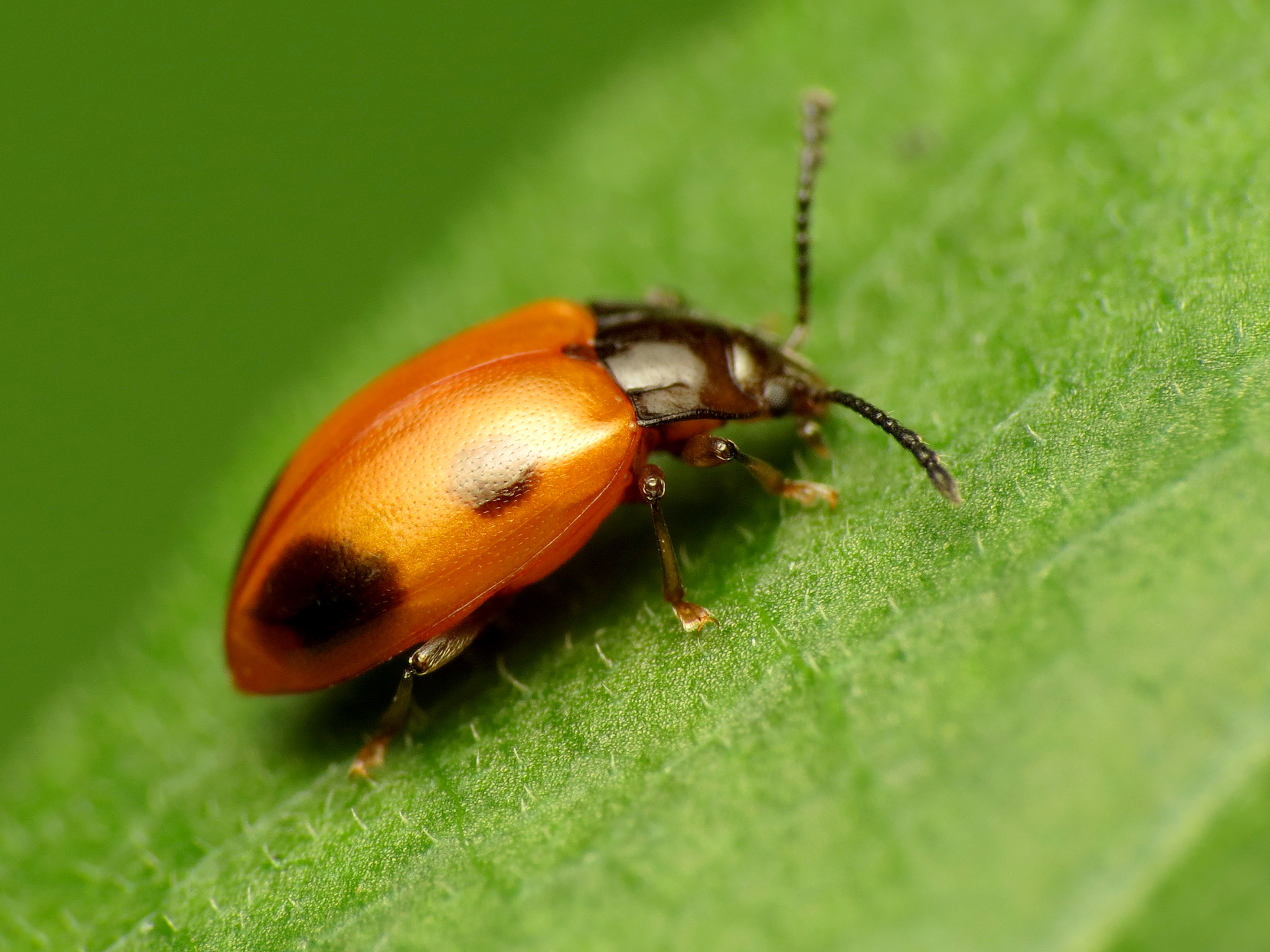
Handsome fungus beetle, Endomychus biguttatus

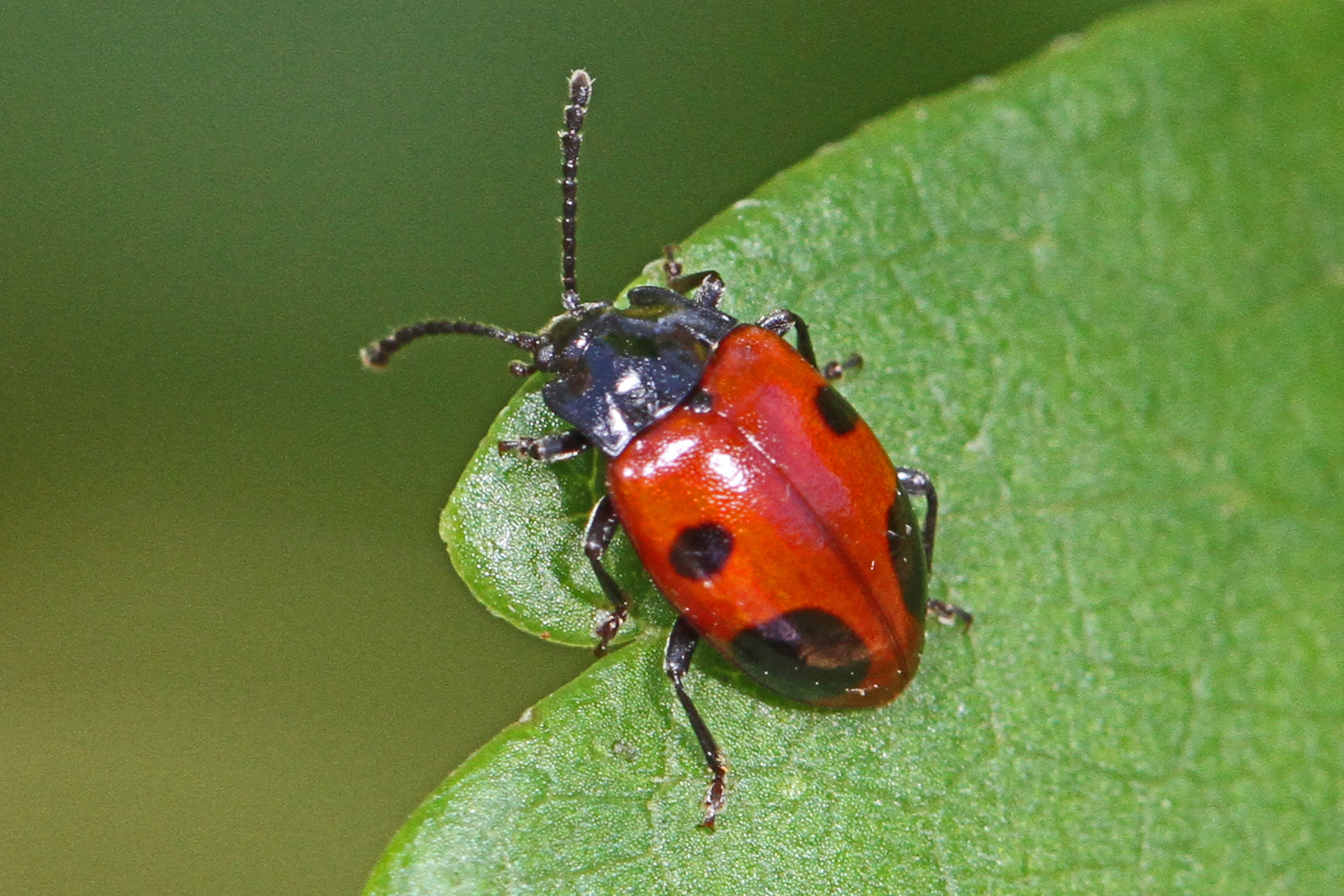
Handsome fungus beetle, Endomychus biguttatus
