= Meilichius =

Scientific classification
- Kingdom: Animalia
- Phylum: Arthropoda
- Clade: Pancrustacea
- Class: Insecta
- Order: Coleoptera
- Suborder: Polyphaga
- Infraorder: Cucujiformia
- Family: Endomychidae
- Genus: Meilichius; Gerstaecker, 1857

Type species
- Meilichius nigricollis Gerstaecker, 1857

Synonyms
- Gibbiger; Milichius (lapsus); Thelgetrum

Genus of beetles

Melichius is a genus of coccinelliod beetles that belongs to the family Endomychidae (handsome fungus beetles).

== Taxonomy ==
Melichius is a beetle that belongs to the family Endomychidae meaning that it is part of the superfamily Coccinelloidea. The genus was established in 1857 by Gerstaecker with Meilichius nigricollis as the type species. In 1920, Thelgetrum was made a synonym of this genus by Arrow. Soon the genus Gibbiger became a synonym of this genus due to the lack of stable diagnostic characters could distinguish it from Meilichius.

=== Species ===
This genus currently contains around ten described species. A list of species can be found below:

- Meilichius aeneoniger Strohecker, 1944
- Meilichius chebalingensis Chang & Li, 2026
- Meilichius erotyloides Strohecker, 1951
- Meilichius klapperichi Mader, 1941
- Meilichius multimaculatus Sasaji, 1970
- Meilichius nigricollis Gerstaecker, 1857
- Meilichius ornatus Arrow, 1920
- Meilichius speciosus Chang & Bi, 2026
- Meilichius tomaszewskae Chang & Bi, 2026
- Meilichius wukong Wang and Tomaszewska, 2025
