= Trycherus kinduensis =

Scientific classification
- Kingdom: Animalia
- Phylum: Arthropoda
- Clade: Pancrustacea
- Class: Insecta
- Order: Coleoptera
- Suborder: Polyphaga
- Infraorder: Cucujiformia
- Family: Endomychidae
- Genus: Trycherus
- Species: T. kinduensis

Binomial name
- Trycherus kinduensis Villiers, 1953

Species of beetle

Trycherus kinduensis is a species of beetle from the Endomychidae family. The scientific name of this species was first published in 1953 by Villiers.
