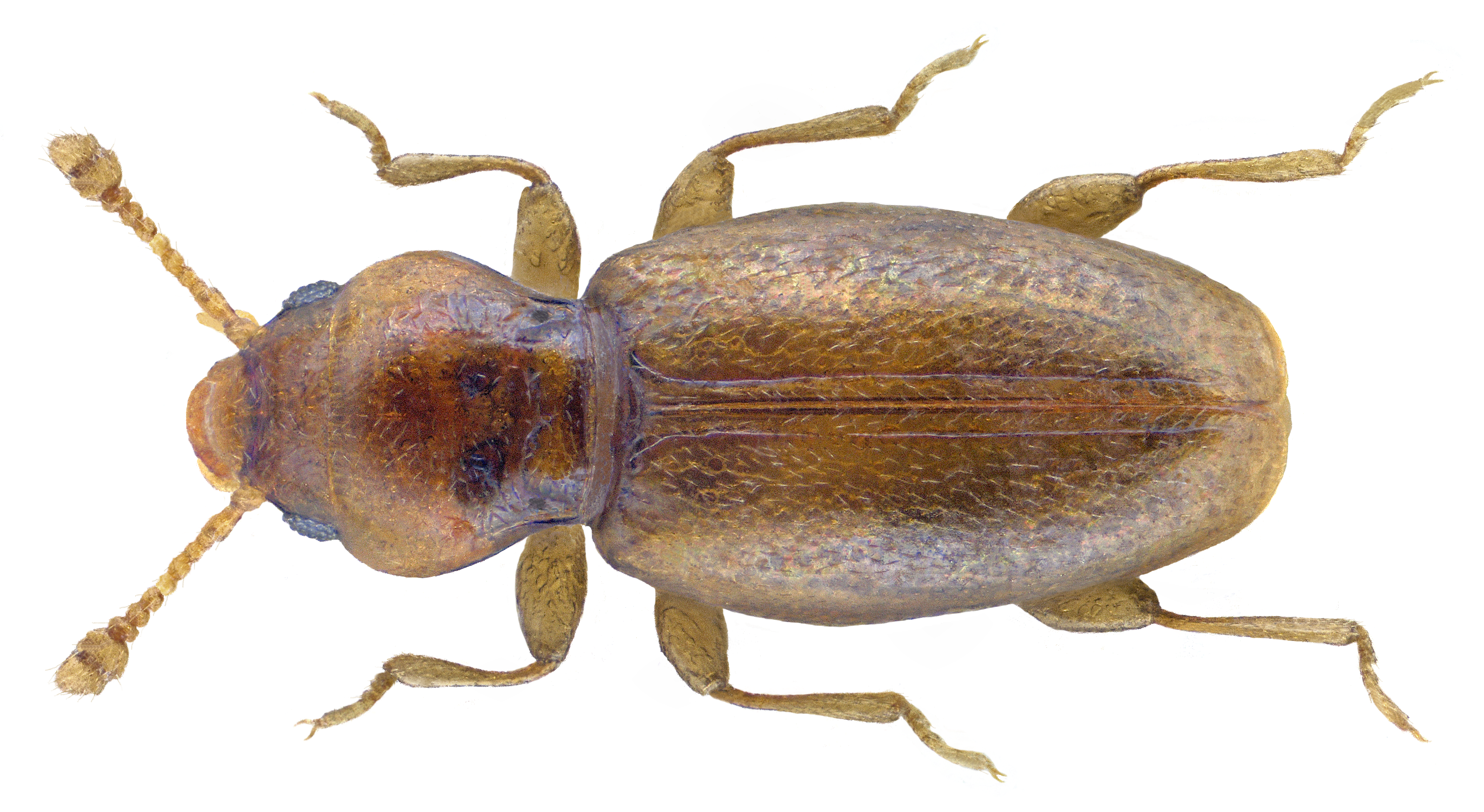

Scientific classification
- Domain: Eukaryota
- Kingdom: Animalia
- Phylum: Arthropoda
- Class: Insecta
- Order: Coleoptera
- Suborder: Polyphaga
- Infraorder: Cucujiformia
- Family: Endomychidae
- Genus: Holoparamecus
- Species: H. caularum

Binomial name
- Holoparamecus caularum Aubé, 1843

= Holoparamecus caularum =

Species of beetle

Holoparamecus caularum is a species of handsome fungus beetle in the family Endomychidae. It is found in Europe and Northern Asia (excluding China) and North America.
