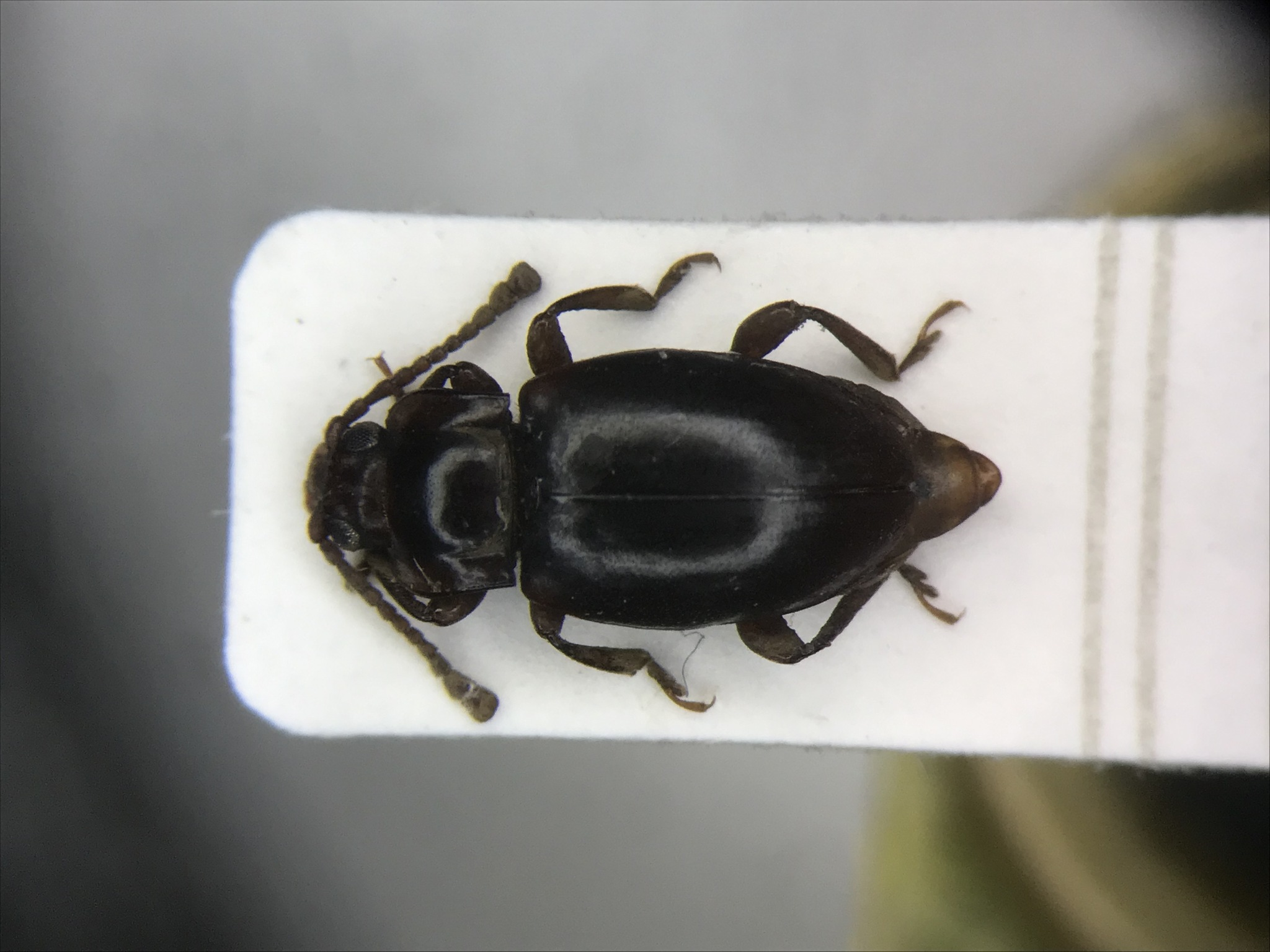

Scientific classification
- Kingdom: Animalia
- Phylum: Arthropoda
- Clade: Pancrustacea
- Class: Insecta
- Order: Coleoptera
- Suborder: Polyphaga
- Infraorder: Cucujiformia
- Family: Endomychidae
- Genus: Lycoperdina
- Species: L. ferruginea

Binomial name
- Lycoperdina ferruginea LeConte, 1824

= Lycoperdina ferruginea =

Species of beetle

Lycoperdina ferruginea is a species of handsome fungus beetle in the family Endomychidae. It is found in North America.
