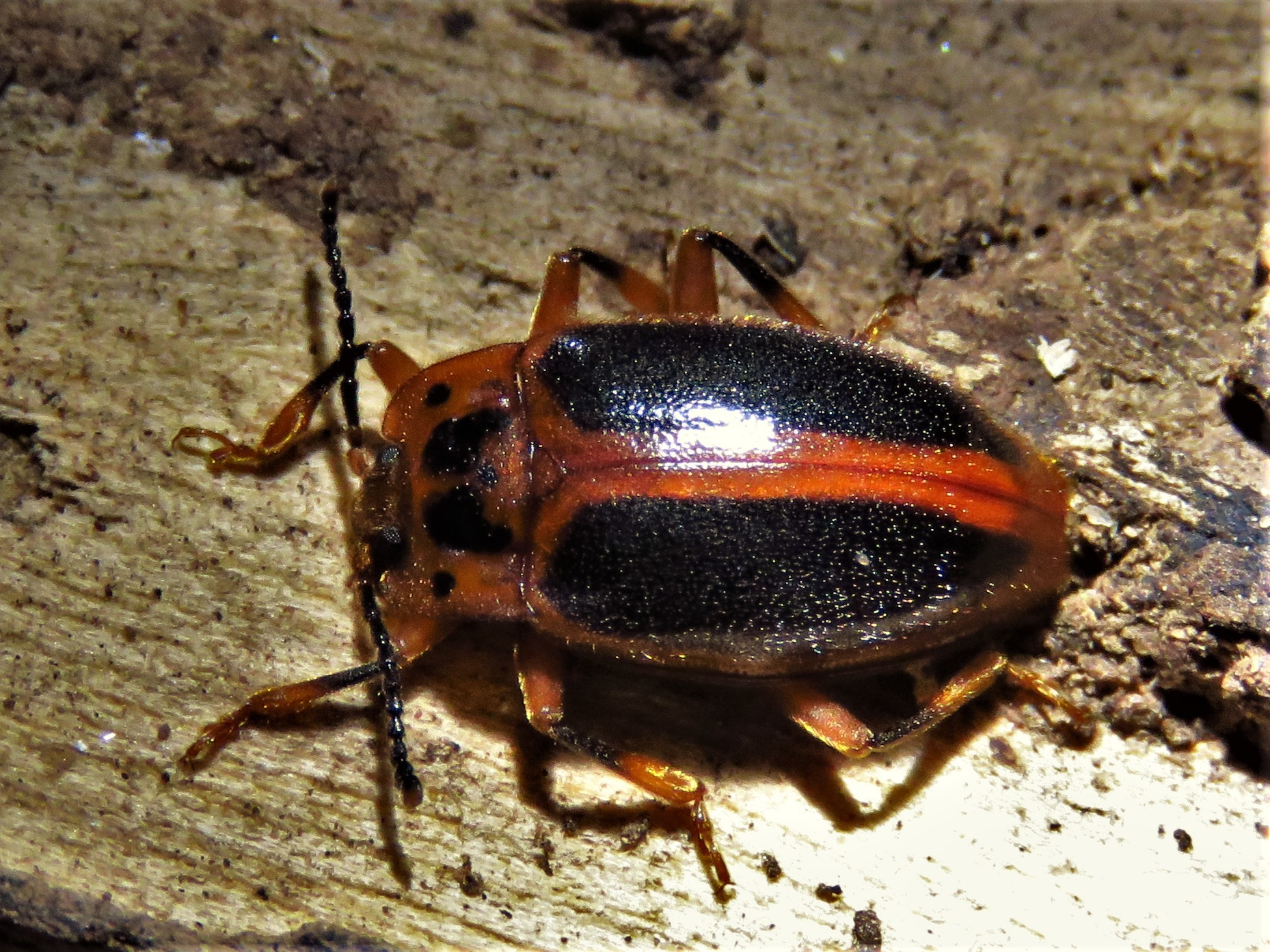

Scientific classification
- Kingdom: Animalia
- Phylum: Arthropoda
- Class: Insecta
- Order: Coleoptera
- Suborder: Polyphaga
- Infraorder: Cucujiformia
- Family: Endomychidae
- Genus: Epipocus
- Species: E. cinctus

Binomial name
- Epipocus cinctus Germar, 1843

= Epipocus cinctus =

Species of beetle

Epipocus cinctus is a species of handsome fungus beetle in the family Endomychidae. It is found in Central America and North America.
