= Xenomycetes morrisoni =

Scientific classification
- Kingdom: Animalia
- Phylum: Arthropoda
- Clade: Pancrustacea
- Class: Insecta
- Order: Coleoptera
- Suborder: Polyphaga
- Infraorder: Cucujiformia
- Family: Endomychidae
- Genus: Xenomycetes
- Species: X. morrisoni

Binomial name
- Xenomycetes morrisoni Horn, 1880

Species of beetle

Xenomycetes morrisoni is a species of handsome fungus beetle in the family Endomychidae. It is endemic to the Western United States. The larvae are mycophagous and measure about 8 mm (0.31 in).
