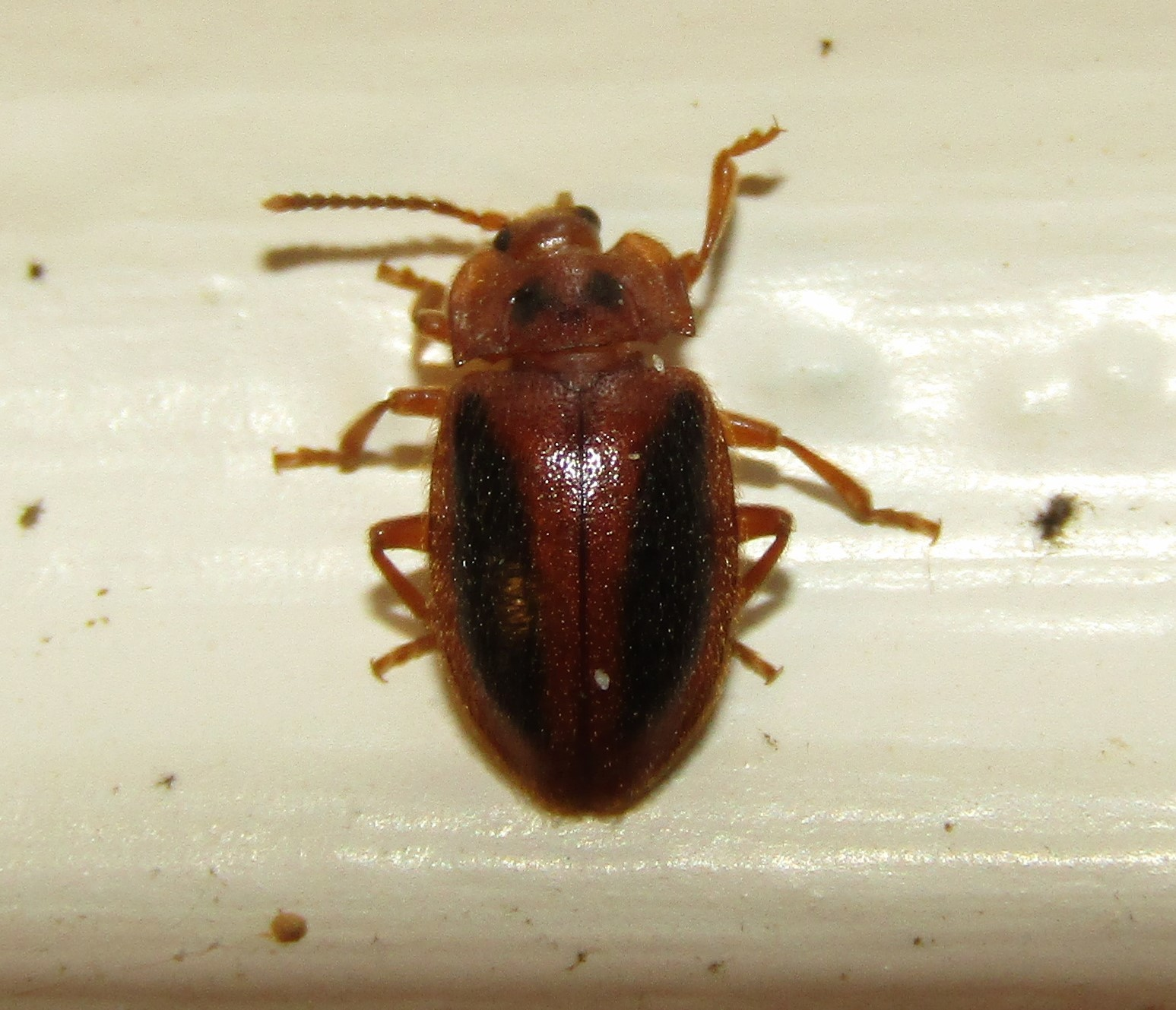

Scientific classification
- Domain: Eukaryota
- Kingdom: Animalia
- Phylum: Arthropoda
- Class: Insecta
- Order: Coleoptera
- Suborder: Polyphaga
- Infraorder: Cucujiformia
- Family: Endomychidae
- Genus: Epipocus
- Species: E. punctatus

Binomial name
- Epipocus punctatus LeConte, 1854

= Epipocus punctatus =

Species of beetle

Epipocus punctatus is a species of handsome fungus beetle in the family Endomychidae. It is found in Central America and North America.
