= Xenomycetes =

Scientific classification
- Kingdom: Animalia
- Phylum: Arthropoda
- Clade: Pancrustacea
- Class: Insecta
- Order: Coleoptera
- Suborder: Polyphaga
- Infraorder: Cucujiformia
- Family: Endomychidae
- Subfamily: Xenomycetinae; Strohecker, 1962
- Genus: Xenomycetes; Horn, 1880

Genus of beetles

Xenomycetes is a genus of handsome fungus beetles in the family Endomychidae. It is the only genus in the subfamily Xenomycetinae. There are two recognized species in Xenomycetes, both endemic to northwestern North America.

== Species ==
These two species belong to the genus Xenomycetes:

- Xenomycetes laversi Hatch, 1962^{i c g}
- Xenomycetes morrisoni Horn, 1880^{i c g b}

Data sources: i = ITIS, c = Catalogue of Life, g = GBIF, b = Bugguide.net

== Ecology ==
The larvae are mycophagous, with Xenomycetes laversi feeding solely on Paxillus atrotomentosus.
