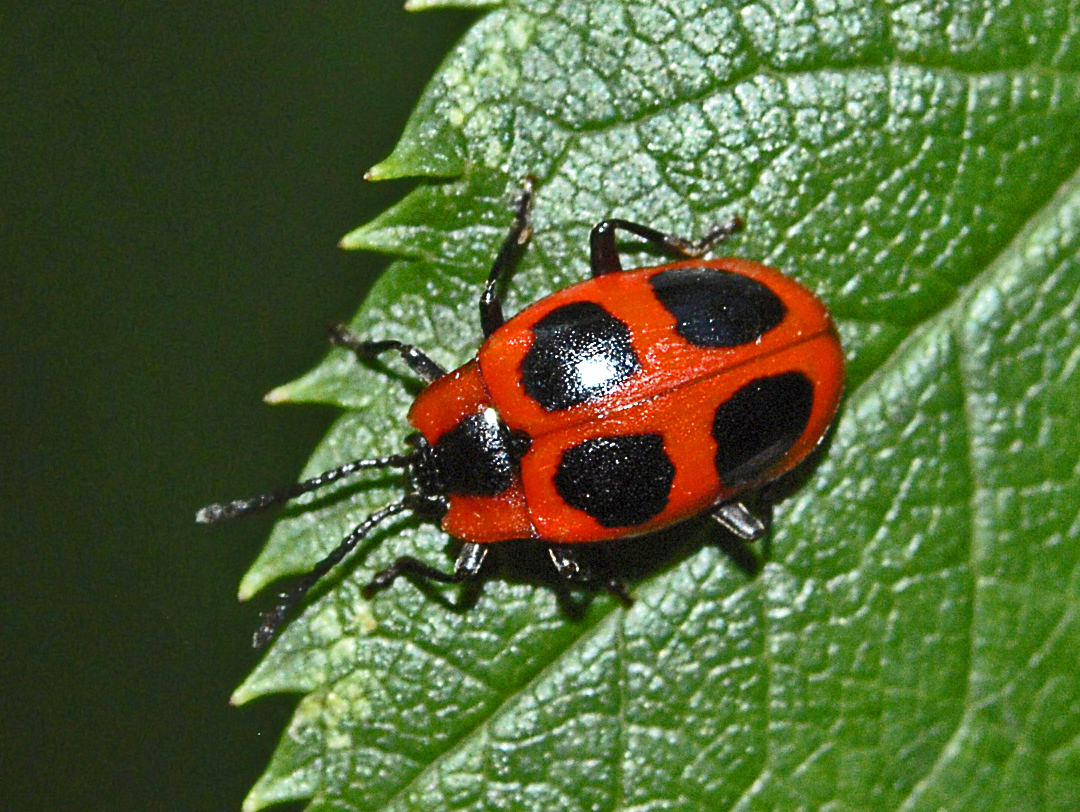

Scientific classification
- Kingdom: Animalia
- Phylum: Arthropoda
- Clade: Pancrustacea
- Class: Insecta
- Order: Coleoptera
- Suborder: Polyphaga
- Infraorder: Cucujiformia
- Family: Endomychidae
- Genus: Endomychus
- Species: E. coccineus

Binomial name
- Endomychus coccineus (Linnaeus, 1758)

Synonyms
- Chrysomela coccinea Linnaeus, 1758; Chrysomela coccineus Linnaeus, 1758; Endomychus biehli Reitter, 1888; Endomychus krynickii Ganglbauer, 1899; Chrysomela quadrimaculata de Geer, 1775; Endomychus quadripunctatus Gorham, 1873

= Endomychus coccineus =

Species of beetle

Endomychus coccineus, the scarlet endomychus or false ladybird, is a species of beetles in the family Endomychidae.

== Description ==
Endomychus coccineus can reach a length of about 4–6 millimetres (0.16–0.24 in). The body is oval, convex and the sides of pronotum are almost straight. Head and legs are black. Pronotum is glossy red, with a black longitudinal area. Elytra are glossy red, each elytron shows two large oval black spots. In rare cases, the pronotum is completely red, the black spots on the elytra may be totally or partially missing. The flight time is from April to June.

The larvae are dark brown with yellow to orange spots symmetrically located in the lateral region of the segmented body, in each case at the head shield, and on the third, fourth, eighth and tenth segment.

== Distribution and habitat ==
This species is present in most of Europe, especially in the deciduous forests.

== Biology ==
Larvae of Endomychus coccineus feed on wood mushrooms, especially on old birch and beech stumps and on deciduous trees affected by the silver leaf fungus Chondrostereum purpureum.
