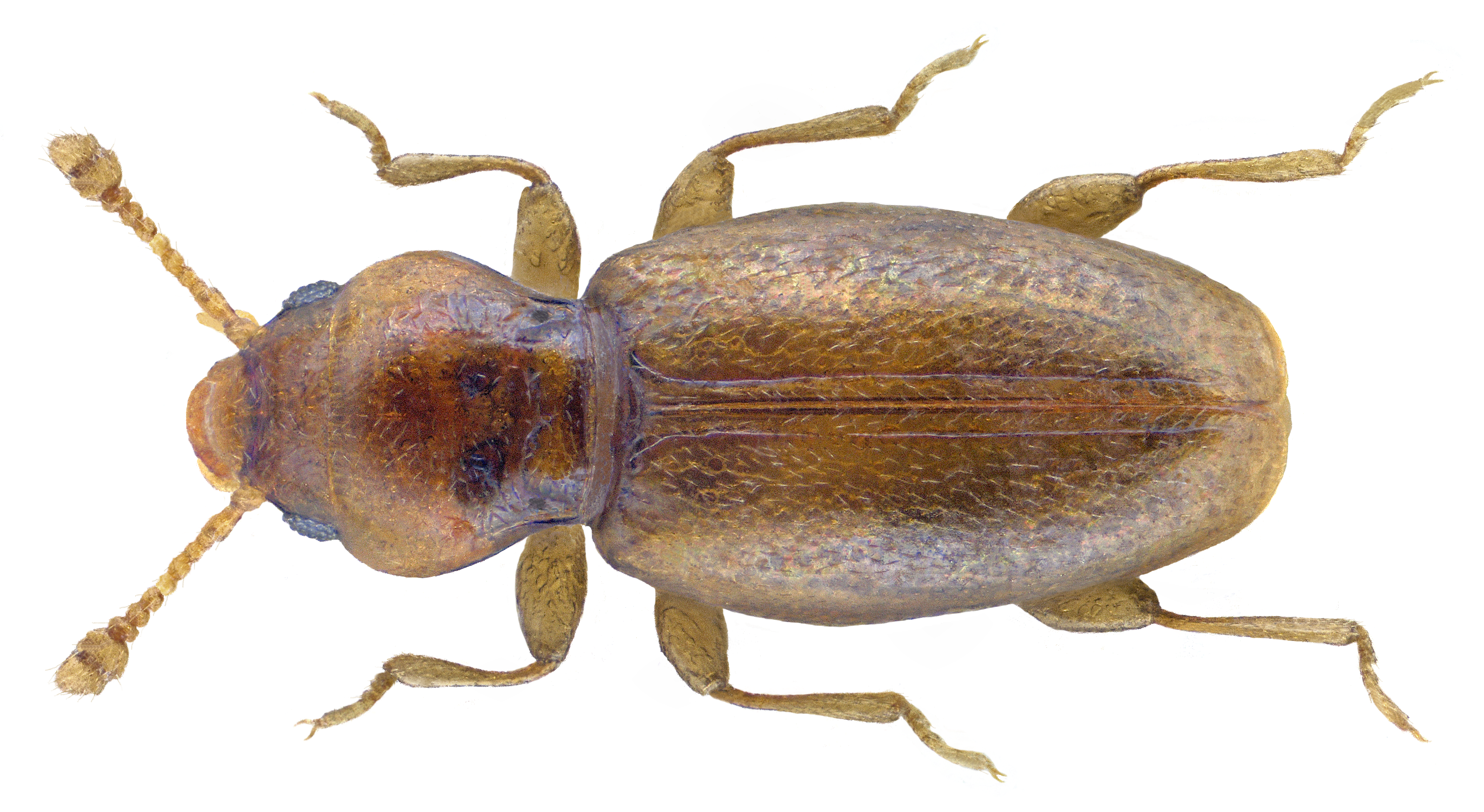
- Holoparamecus caularum

Scientific classification
- Kingdom: Animalia
- Phylum: Arthropoda
- Class: Insecta
- Order: Coleoptera
- Suborder: Polyphaga
- Infraorder: Cucujiformia
- Family: Endomychidae
- Subfamily: Merophysiinae
- Genus: Holoparamecus; Curtis, 1833

= Holoparamecus =

Genus of beetles

Holoparamecus is a genus of handsome fungus beetles in the family Endomychidae. There are about 17 described species in Holoparamecus.

== Species ==
These 17 species belong to the genus Holoparamecus:

- Holoparamecus amabilis Sasaji, 1991
- Holoparamecus atomus Ragusa, 1888
- Holoparamecus beloni Reitter, 1884
- Holoparamecus bertouti Aubé, 1861
- Holoparamecus caularum Aubé, 1843
- Holoparamecus constrictus Sharp, 1902
- Holoparamecus depressus Curtis, 1833
- Holoparamecus floridanus Fall, 1899
- Holoparamecus gabrielae Rücker, 2003
- Holoparamecus insularis Dajoz, 1972
- Holoparamecus kunzei Aubé, 1843
- Holoparamecus niger (Aubé, 1843)
- Holoparamecus pacificus LeConte, 1863
- Holoparamecus pumilus Sharp, 1902
- Holoparamecus punctatulus Reitter, 1908
- Holoparamecus ragusae Reitter, 1875
- Holoparamecus singularis Beck, 1917
