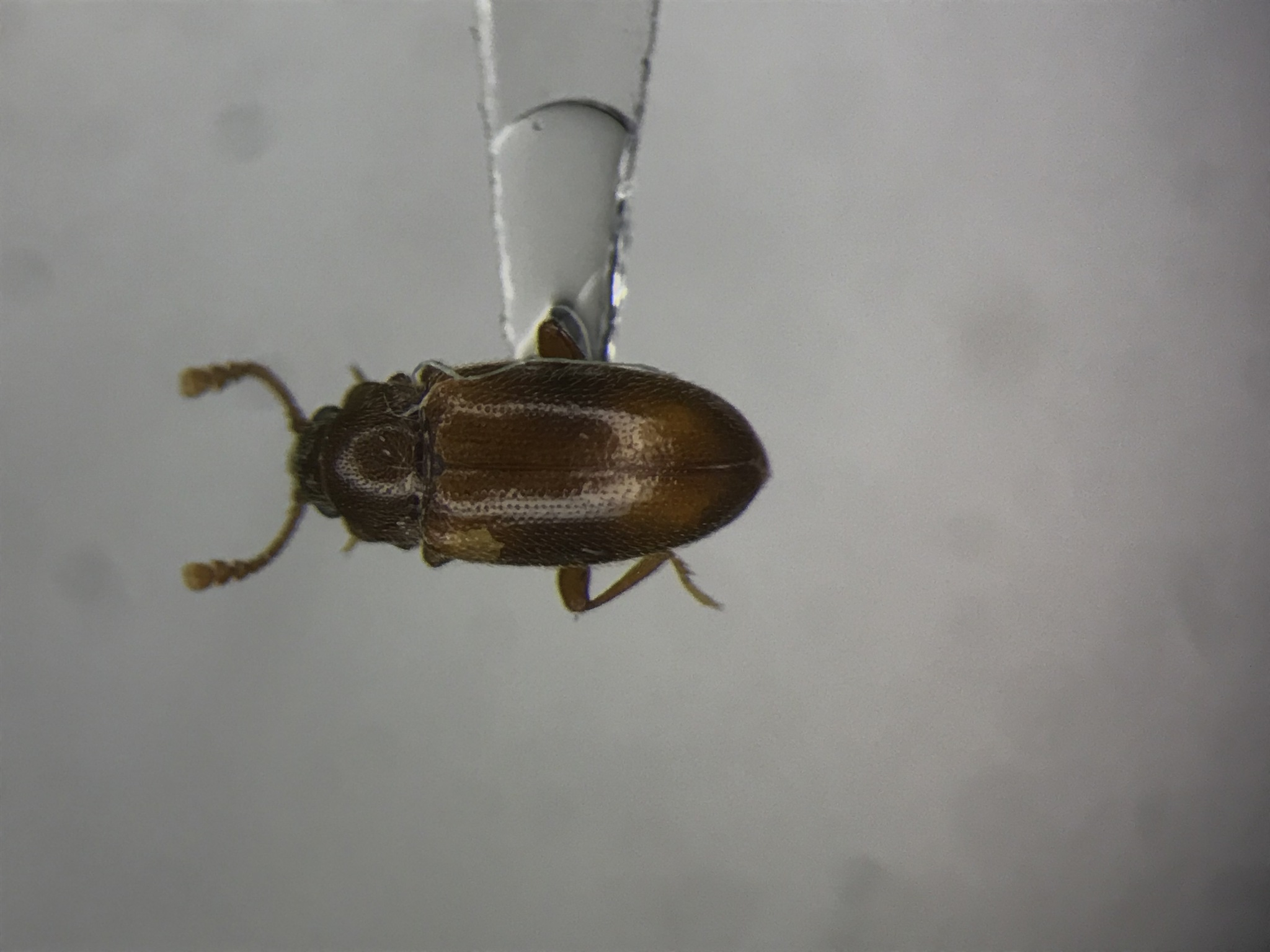
- Hadromychus chandleri

Scientific classification
- Kingdom: Animalia
- Phylum: Arthropoda
- Clade: Pancrustacea
- Class: Insecta
- Order: Coleoptera
- Suborder: Polyphaga
- Infraorder: Cucujiformia
- Family: Endomychidae
- Genus: Hadromychus; Bousquet & Leschen, 2002
- Species: H. chandleri

Binomial name
- Hadromychus chandleri Bousquet & Leschen, 2002

= Hadromychus =

Genus of beetles

Hadromychus is a genus of handsome fungus beetles in the family Endomychidae. The genus contains one described species, Hadromychus chandleri.
