= Leiestes =

Scientific classification
- Domain: Eukaryota
- Kingdom: Animalia
- Phylum: Arthropoda
- Class: Insecta
- Order: Coleoptera
- Suborder: Polyphaga
- Infraorder: Cucujiformia
- Family: Endomychidae
- Genus: Leiestes; Chevrolat, 1836

Genus of beetles

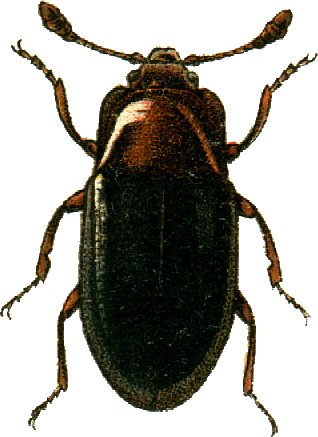
An example of an Leisthes specimen (Liesthes seminigra)

Leiestes is a genus of beetles belonging to the family Endomychidae.

Species:

- Leiestes seminiger
