= Ephebus (beetle) =

Scientific classification
- Kingdom: Animalia
- Phylum: Arthropoda
- Class: Insecta
- Order: Coleoptera
- Suborder: Polyphaga
- Infraorder: Cucujiformia
- Family: Endomychidae
- Subfamily: Epipocinae
- Genus: Ephebus; Gerstaecker 1858.

Genus of beetles

Ephebus is a genus of handsome fungus beetles in the family Endomychidae. There are several described species in Ephebus.

== Species ==
These 9 species belong to the genus Ephebus:

- Ephebus cardinalis Gerstaecker, 1858 – Colombia
- Ephebus chontalesianus Gorham, 1887/99 – Costa Rica, Guatemala, Guyana, Honduras, Nicaragua, Panama.
- Ephebus convexiusculus Gerstaecker, 1858 – Colombia, Venezuela
- Ephebus exclusus Strohecker, 1975 – Guatemala
- Ephebus hirtulus Gerstaecker, 1858 – Bolivia, Brazil
- Ephebus longulus Stroheckjer, 1975 – Guatemala
- Ephebus piceus Gorham, 1887/99 – Colombia, Guatemala, Nicaragua.
- Ephebus pumilus Gerstaecker, 1858 – Colombia
- Ephebus sulcatus Strohecker, 1975 – Colombia, El Salvador, Mexico.
- Ephebus terminatus Gerstaecker, 1858 – Colombia, Venezuela
