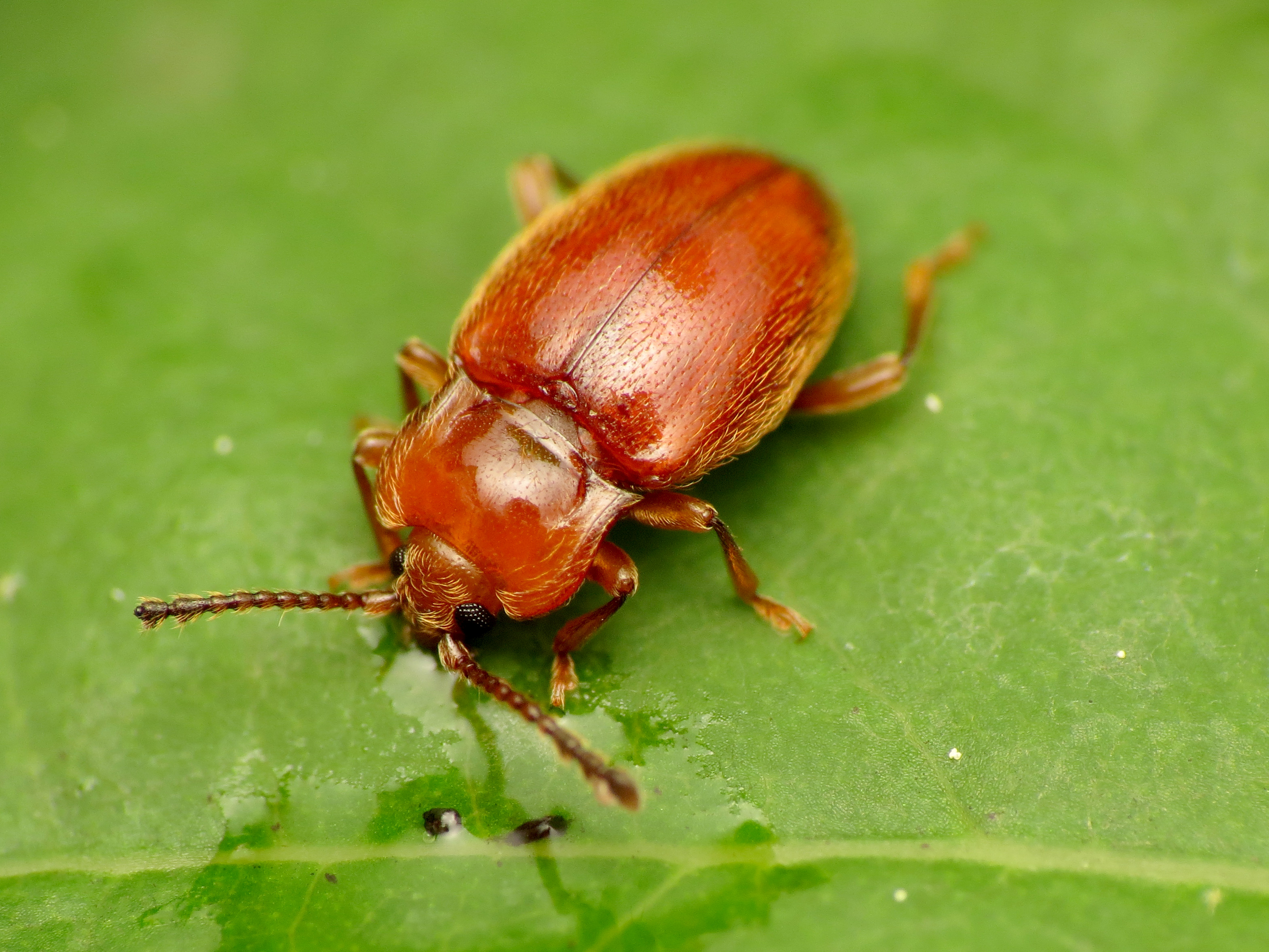
- Danae testacea adult (Rock Creek Park, USA)

Scientific classification
- Kingdom: Animalia
- Phylum: Arthropoda
- Clade: Pancrustacea
- Class: Insecta
- Order: Coleoptera
- Suborder: Polyphaga
- Infraorder: Cucujiformia
- Family: Endomychidae
- Subfamily: Endomychinae
- Genus: Danae; Reiche, 1847

= Danae (beetle) =

Genus of beetles

Danae is a beetle genus in the handsome fungus beetle family (Endomychidae). There are almost 100 species in Danae, 1 found in North America, about 10 in Asia, and the remainder in Africa.

== Species ==
These 97 species belong to the genus Danae:

- Danae abdominalis Weise, 1903 - Kenya, Tanzania, Uganda
- Danae aetha Strohecker, 1962 - Congo, DR Congo, Ghana
- Danae algoensis (Gorham, 1905 - South Africa
- Danae androgyna Strohecker, 1974 - DR Congo, Mozambique, South Africa, Tanzania, Zambia
- Danae antennata Strohecker, 1962 - DR Congo
- Danae armata Arrow, 1920 - Congo, DR Congo, Ghana, Malawi, Nigeria
- Danae arrowi Strohecker, 1952 - DR Congo
- Danae ascipes Strohecker, 1957 - Congo
- Danae atrimembris Pic, 1946 - Kenya
- Danae atronotata Pic, 1922 - Cambodia
- Danae attenuatus Strohecker, 1962 - DR Congo
- Danae augusticlava Strohecker, 1953 - Congo
- Danae babaulti Pic, 1922 - Kenya, Tanzania, Uganda
- Danae borneensis Strohecker, 1979 - Borneo
- Danae brevicollis Strohecker, 1959 - DR Congo, Tanzania
- Danae bulbifera Weise, 1903 - Rwanda, Tanzania
- Danae calcarata Arrow, 1936 - South Africa
- Danae capnicera Strohecker, 1953 - Congo, DR Congo
- Danae caprella Strohecker, 1949 - DR Congo
- Danae castanea Sasaji, 1978 - Japan
- Danae cavicollis Arrow, 1920 - DR Congo, South Africa, Zimbabwe
- Danae chappuisi Pic, 1946 - Kenya
- Danae chinensis Strohecker, 1951
- Danae ciliatipes Arrow, 1920 - Myanmar
- Danae clauda Arrow, 1925 - India
- Danae compressa Strohecker, 1960 - DR Congo, Ghana, Uganda
- Danae compsa Strohecker, 1962 - DR Congo
- Danae cordicornis Strohecker, 1959 - DR Congo, Tanzania
- Danae curvicrus Strohecker, 1953 - Congo, DR Congo
- Danae curvipes Arrow, 1920 - Congo, DR Congo, Malawi
- Danae cylindrica Strohecker, 1952 - DR Congo
- Danae damnifica Strohecker, 1952 - DR Congo
- Danae denticornis (Gorham, 1873) - Japan
- Danae dentipes Arrow, 1920 - Zimbabwe
- Danae difficilis Strohecker, 1952 - DR Congo
- Danae diversicornis Pic, 1945 - Kenya, Tanzania, Uganda
- Danae elgonensis Pic, 1946 - Kenya
- Danae elliptica Strohecker, 1957 - Ethiopia
- Danae exhauriens Strohecker, 1955 - Rwanda
- Danae femoralis Arrow, 1920 - Malawi
- Danae foveata Strohecker, 1953 - Congo
- Danae foveicornis Strohecker, 1957 - Kenya, Tanzania, Uganda
- Danae gazella Strohecker, 1973 - Congo, DR Congo
- Danae gestroi Strohecker, 1967 - Congo
- Danae globifera Strohecker, 1953 - Congo
- Danae goffarti Pic, 1945 - Burundi, DR Congo, Rwanda
- Danae gracilis Strohecker, 1952 - DR Congo
- Danae gracillima Strohecker, 1968 - Côte d'Ivoire
- Danae heliobleta Strohecker, 1953 - Congo
- Danae hirsutipes Strohecker, 1979 - Borneo
- Danae incerta Strohecker, 1962 - DR Congo, Ghana
- Danae incisa Strohecker, 1962 - DR Congo
- Danae indefinita Strohecker, 1957 - Congo
- Danae jeanneli Pic, 1946 - Kenya
- Danae jucunda Arrow, 1936 - Ethiopia
- Danae latipes Strohecker, 1954 - DR Congo
- Danae leona Strohecker, 1962 - DR Congo
- Danae longa Strohecker, 1957 - Kenya
- Danae longicornis Arrow, 1920 - South Africa
- Danae longipennis Strohecker, 1953 - Congo
- Danae macra Strohecker, 1952 - DR Congo
- Danae masculina Strohecker, 1957 - DR Congo, Uganda
- Danae microdera Arrow, 1936 - Sudan
- Danae natalensis (Gerstaecker, 1858) - South Africa, Zimbabwe
- Danae nigrosignata Strohecker, 1944 - Java
- Danae nimbensis Villiers, 1954 - DR Congo
- Danae orientalis (Gorham, 1873) - Japan
- Danae ornata Arrow, 1925 - India
- Danae ovata Arrow, 1948 - DR Congo, Ghana, Zimbabwe
- Danae parallela Strohecker, 1959 - DR Congo, Kenya, Tanzania
- Danae parvicornis Strohecker, 1952 - DR Congo
- Danae parvidens Strohecker, 1953 - Congo, Rwanda
- Danae pulchella Gestro, 1895 - Kenya, Tanzania, Uganda
- Danae pusilla Strohecker, 1957 - Kenya
- Danae pygmaea Strohecker, 1957 - Congo
- Danae recta Strohecker, 1973 - Congo, DR Congo
- Danae ruficornis Pic, 1945 - Congo, Kenya, Zimbabwe
- Danae rufipes Pic, 1946 - Kenya
- Danae rufula Reiche, 1847 - Ethiopia
- Danae seminicornis Strohecker, 1952 - DR Congo
- Danae senegalensis (Gerstaecker, 1858) - Benin, DR Congo, Malawi, Senegal
- Danae sericea Arrow, 1925 - India
- Danae shibatai Nakane, 1958 - Japan
- Danae sibutensis Pic, 1921 - Central African Republic
- Danae similis Weise 1903 - South Africa
- Danae simplex Strohecker, 1962 - DR Congo
- Danae subcurvipes Pic, 1946 - Kenya
- Danae taiwana Chûjô, 1938 - Taiwan
- Danae testacea (Ziegler, 1845) - Canada, United States
- Danae tibialis Arrow, 1920 - Kenya, Malawi
- Danae tournieri Villiers, 1954 - DR Congo
- Danae trigona Strohecker, 1962 - DR Congo
- Danae turneri Arrow, 1948 - South Africa
- Danae uelensis Strohecker, 1974 - DR Congo
- Danae valga Strohecker, 1952 - DR Congo
- Danae venustula Gestro, 1895 - Tanzania
- Danae weisei Strohecker, 1954 - DR Congo
