= Leiestinae =

Scientific classification
- Kingdom: Animalia
- Phylum: Arthropoda
- Class: Insecta
- Order: Coleoptera
- Suborder: Polyphaga
- Infraorder: Cucujiformia
- Family: Endomychidae
- Subfamily: Leiestinae; C. G. Thomson, 1863

Subfamily of beetles

Leiestinae is a subfamily of handsome fungus beetles in the family Endomychidae. There are at least three genera and about five described species in Leiestinae.

== Genera ==
These genera belong to the subfamily Leiestinae:

- Phymaphora Newman, 1838
- Rhanidea Strohecker, 1953
- Sinopanamomus Esser, 2019
- Stethorhanis Blaisdell, 1931
