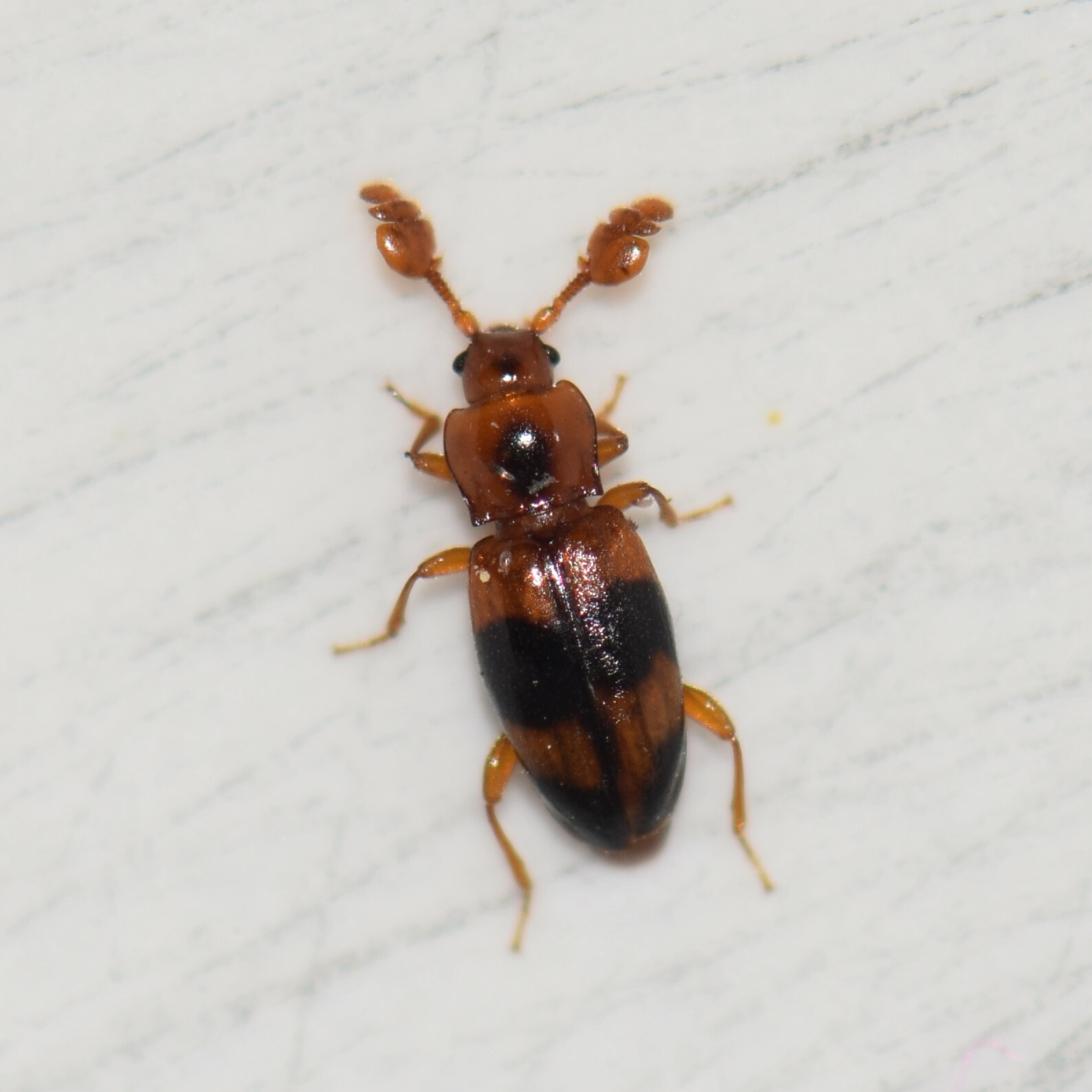
- Phymaphora pulchella

Scientific classification
- Kingdom: Animalia
- Phylum: Arthropoda
- Class: Insecta
- Order: Coleoptera
- Suborder: Polyphaga
- Infraorder: Cucujiformia
- Family: Endomychidae
- Subfamily: Leiestinae
- Genus: Phymaphora; Newman, 1838

= Phymaphora =

Genus of beetles

Phymaphora is a genus of handsome fungus beetles in the family Endomychidae. There are at least two described species in Phymaphora.

== Species ==
These two species belong to the genus Phymaphora:

- Phymaphora californica Horn, 1880
- Phymaphora pulchella Newman, 1838
