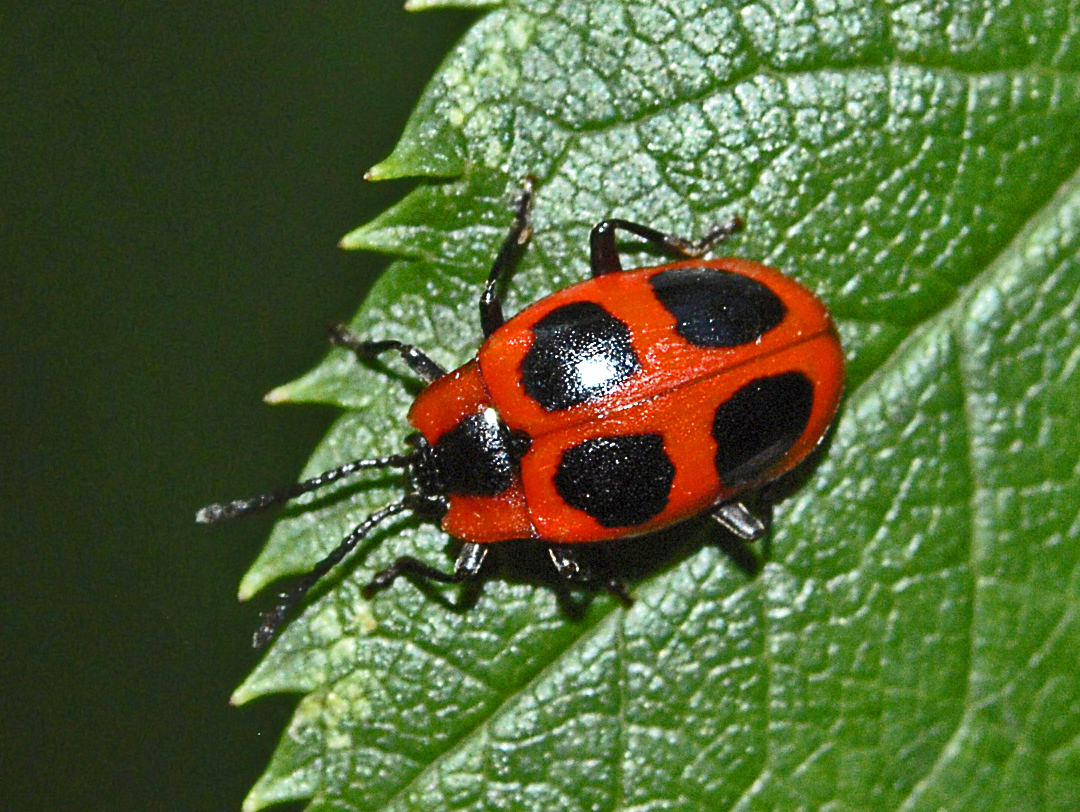
- Endomychus coccineus

Scientific classification
- Kingdom: Animalia
- Phylum: Arthropoda
- Clade: Pancrustacea
- Class: Insecta
- Order: Coleoptera
- Suborder: Polyphaga
- Infraorder: Cucujiformia
- Family: Endomychidae
- Subfamily: Endomychinae
- Genus: Endomychus; Panzer, 1795

Synonyms
- Caenomychus Lewis, 1893; Cyanauges Lewis, 1874 nec Rondani, 1863

= Endomychus =

Genus of beetles

Endomychus is a genus of Palearctic, Nearctic and Oriental realm beetles in the family Endomychidae.

== Species ==
The following species are assigned to this genus:

- Endomychus agatae Tomaszewska, 1997
- Endomychus armeniacus Motschulsky, 1835
- Endomychus atriceps Pic, 1932
- Endomychus atricornis Tomaszewska, 1998
- Endomychus atrimembris Pic, 1922
- Endomychus atripes Pic, 1921
- Endomychus bicolor Gorham, 1875
- Endomychus biguttatus Say, 1824
- Endomychus chinensis Csiki, 1937
- Endomychus coccineus (Linnaeus, 1758)
- Endomychus divisus Arrow, 1920
- Endomychus flavus Strohecker, 1943
- Endomychus foveolatus Tomaszewska, 2002
- Endomychus gorhami (Lewis, 1874)
- Endomychus hiranoi Sasaji, 1978
- Endomychus humeralis (Pic, 1922)
- Endomychus jureceki Mader, 1936
- Endomychus limbatus (Horn, 1874)
- Endomychus micrus Tomaszewska, 1997
- Endomychus mroczkowskii Tomaszewska, 1997
- Endomychus mulleri (Mader, 1955)
- Endomychus nigricapitatus Tomaszewska, 2002
- Endomychus nigriceps Chűjô, 1938
- Endomychus nigricornis Chűjô, 1938
- Endomychus nigripes Mader, 1955
- Endomychus nigropiceus (Gorham, 1887)
- Endomychus pakistanicus Tomaszewska, 1997
- Endomychus plagiatus (Gorham, 1887)
- Endomychus punctatus Arrow, 1928
- Endomychus quadra (Gorham, 1887)
- Endomychus rogeri Tomaszewska, 1997
- Endomychus rufipes Pic, 1946
- Endomychus sasajii Tomaszewska, 1998
- Endomychus sauteri Chűjô, 1938
- Endomychus slipinskii Tomaszewska, 1997
- Endomychus thoracicus Charpentier, 1825
- Endomychus tomishimai Nakane, 1994
- Endomychus violaceipennis (Mader, 1943)
- Endomychus yunnani Tomaszewska, 1997
