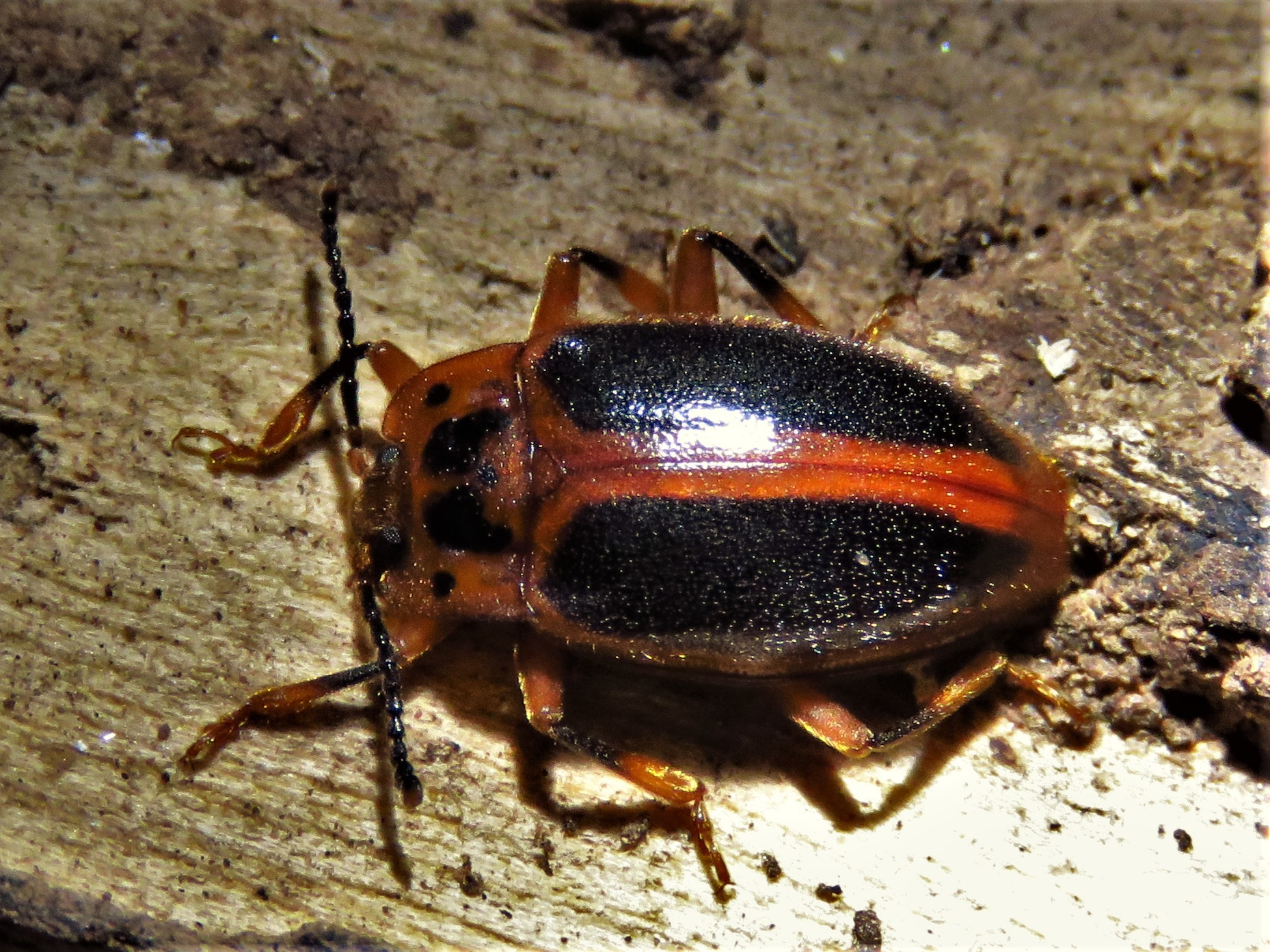
- Epipocus cinctus

Scientific classification
- Kingdom: Animalia
- Phylum: Arthropoda
- Class: Insecta
- Order: Coleoptera
- Suborder: Polyphaga
- Infraorder: Cucujiformia
- Family: Endomychidae
- Subfamily: Epipocinae; Gorham, 1873

= Epipocinae =

Subfamily of beetles

Epipocinae is a subfamily of handsome fungus beetles in the family Endomychidae. There are at least 4 genera and more than 40 described species in Epipocinae.

== Genera ==
These four genera belong to the subfamily Epipocinae:

- Anidrytus Gerstaecker, 1858
- Ephebus Gerstaecker, 1858 [See note]
- Epipocus Germar, 1843
- Epopterus Chevrolat in Dejean, 1836

[Note: Attribution of "Ephebus" to Chevrolat in Dejean, 1836 in some sources is rejected by Bousquet & Bouchard & 2013: 140 who indicate no available species names in prior usage]
