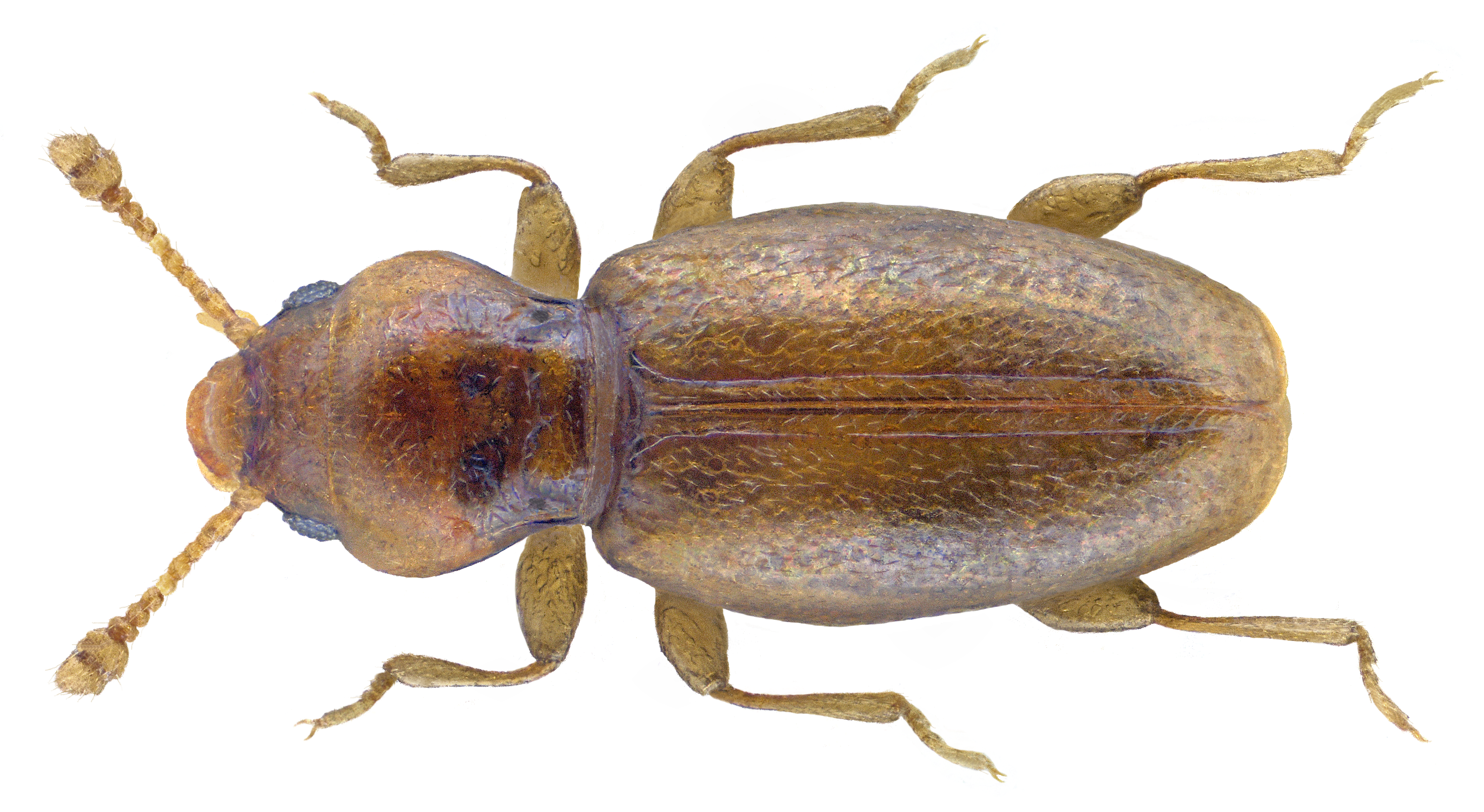
- Holoparamecus

Scientific classification
- Kingdom: Animalia
- Phylum: Arthropoda
- Class: Insecta
- Order: Coleoptera
- Suborder: Polyphaga
- Infraorder: Cucujiformia
- Family: Endomychidae
- Subfamily: Merophysiinae; Seidlitz, 1872

Synonyms
- Holoparamecinae Seidlitz, 1888

= Merophysiinae =

Subfamily of beetles

Merophysiinae is a subfamily of handsome fungus beetles in the family Endomychidae.

== Genera ==
These 15 genera belong to the subfamily Merophysiinae:

- Cholovocera Motschulsky, 1838^{r}
- Displotera Reitter, 1877^{r}
- Evolocera Sharp, 1902^{i c g r}
- Fallia Sharp, 1902^{i c g r}
- Gomya Dajoz, 1973^{r}
- Hexasternum Rücker, 1983^{r}
- Holoparamecus Curtis, 1833^{i c g b r}
- Lathrapion Rücker, 1983^{r}
- Lycoperdinella Champion, 1913^{r}
- Merophysia Lucas, 1852^{r}
- Pseudevolocera Champion, 1913^{r}
- Pseudoparamecus Brethes, 1922^{r}
- Pythlarhinus Dajoz, 1970^{r}
- Reitteria Leder, 1872^{c g r}
- Rueckeria Arriaga-Varela, 2018

Data sources: i = ITIS, c = Catalogue of Life, g = GBIF, b = Bugguide.net, r = Rücker,
