= Displotera =

Scientific classification
- Kingdom: Animalia
- Phylum: Arthropoda
- Class: Insecta
- Order: Coleoptera
- Suborder: Polyphaga
- Infraorder: Cucujiformia
- Family: Endomychidae
- Subfamily: Merophysiinae
- Genus: Displotera; Reitter, 1877

Synonyms
- Eleutheroda Brunner von Wattenwyl, 1865

Genus of beetles

Displotera is a genus of handsome fungus beetles in the family Endomychidae.

== Selected species ==
- Displotera beloni (Wasmann, 1899)
- Displotera grandis Dajoz, 1975
- Displotera maderae (Wollaston, 1854)
- Displotera simoni Reitter, 1887
