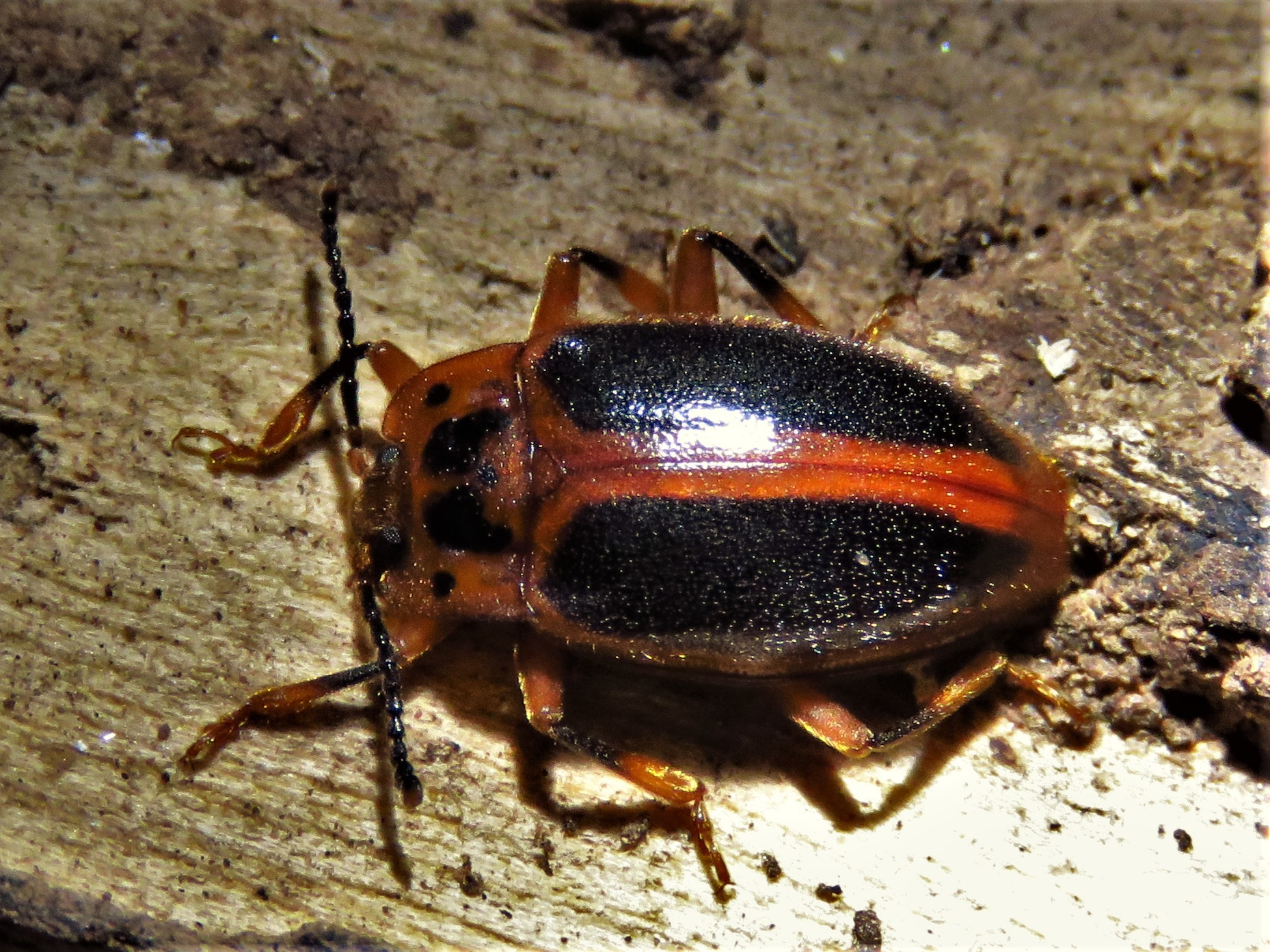
- Epipocus cinctus

Scientific classification
- Kingdom: Animalia
- Phylum: Arthropoda
- Class: Insecta
- Order: Coleoptera
- Suborder: Polyphaga
- Infraorder: Cucujiformia
- Family: Endomychidae
- Subfamily: Epipocinae
- Genus: Epipocus; Germar, 1843

= Epipocus =

Genus of beetles

Epipocus is a genus of handsome fungus beetles in the family Endomychidae. There are at least 20 described species in Epipocus.

== Species ==
These 21 species belong to the genus Epipocus:

- Epipocus aztecus Strohecker, 1977
- Epipocus balli Strohecker, 1977
- Epipocus brunneus Gorham, 1889
- Epipocus cinctus Germar, 1843
- Epipocus cryptus Strohecker, 1977
- Epipocus figuratus Gerstaecker, 1858
- Epipocus flavipes Strohecker, 1977
- Epipocus gorhami Strohecker, 1977
- Epipocus guatemoc Strohecker, 1977
- Epipocus longicornis Gerstaecker, 1858
- Epipocus mixtecus Strohecker, 1977
- Epipocus nanus Strohecker, 1977
- Epipocus opacus Strohecker, 1977
- Epipocus punctatus LeConte, 1854
- Epipocus rufitarsis (Chevrolat, 1835)
- Epipocus sallaei Gorham, 1889
- Epipocus subcostatus Gorham, 1889
- Epipocus tibialis (Chevrolat, 1834)
- Epipocus toltecus Strohecker, 1977
- Epipocus tristinoctis Strohecker, 1977
- Epipocus unicolor Horn, 1870
