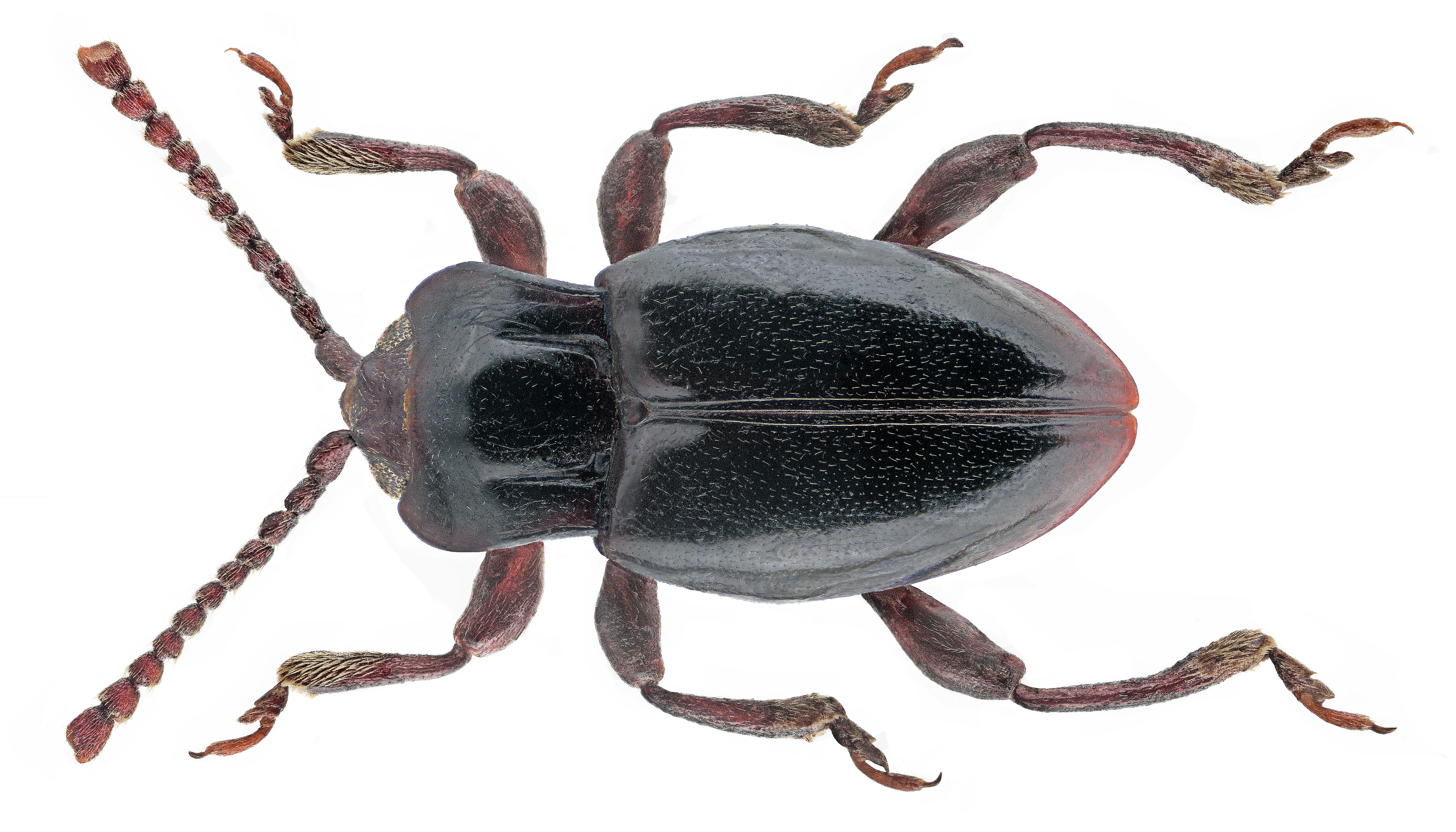
- Lycoperdina bovistae

Scientific classification
- Kingdom: Animalia
- Phylum: Arthropoda
- Class: Insecta
- Order: Coleoptera
- Suborder: Polyphaga
- Infraorder: Cucujiformia
- Family: Endomychidae
- Subfamily: Lycoperdininae
- Genus: Lycoperdina; Latreille, 1807

= Lycoperdina =

Genus of beetles

Lycoperdina is a genus of handsome fungus beetles in the family Endomychidae. There are about 16 described species in Lycoperdina.

== Species ==
These 16 species belong to the genus Lycoperdina:

- Lycoperdina banatica Ganglbauer, 1899
- Lycoperdina bovistae (Fabricius, 1792)
- Lycoperdina canariensis Gillerfors, 1991
- Lycoperdina crassicornis Reitter, 1880
- Lycoperdina ferruginea LeConte, 1824
- Lycoperdina gomerae Franz, 1979
- Lycoperdina hiranoi Sogoh & Yoshitomi, 2017
- Lycoperdina humeralis Wollaston, 1864
- Lycoperdina immaculata Latreille, 1807
- Lycoperdina maritima Reitter, 1884
- Lycoperdina penicillata Marseul, 1868
- Lycoperdina pulvinata Reitter, 1884
- Lycoperdina sanchezi Oromi & Garcia, 1987
- Lycoperdina smirnoviorum Gusakov, 2017
- Lycoperdina succincta (Linnaeus, 1767)
- Lycoperdina validicornis Gerstäcker, 1858
