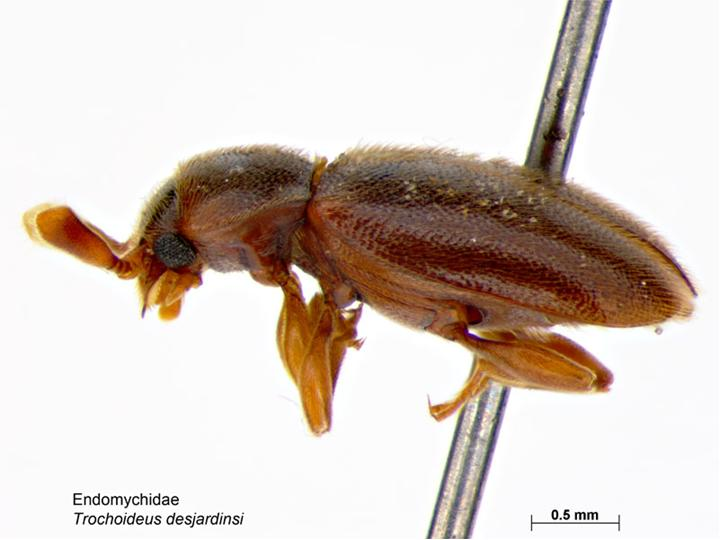
- Trochoideus desjardinsi

Scientific classification
- Kingdom: Animalia
- Phylum: Arthropoda
- Class: Insecta
- Order: Coleoptera
- Suborder: Polyphaga
- Infraorder: Cucujiformia
- Family: Endomychidae
- Subfamily: Pleganophorinae
- Genus: Trochoideus; Westwood, 1833

= Trochoideus =

Genus of beetles

Trochoideus is a genus of handsome fungus beetles in the family Endomychidae. There are about 10 described species in Trochoideus.

== Species ==
These 10 species belong to the genus Trochoideus:

- Trochoideus americanus Buquet, 1840^{i c g}
- Trochoideus boliviensis Strohecker, 1978^{i c g}
- Trochoideus coeloantennatus Strohecker, 1943^{i c g}
- Trochoideus desjardinsi Guérin-Méneville, 1857^{i c g b}
- Trochoideus globulicornis Joly and Bordon, 1996^{i c g}
- Trochoideus goudoti Guérin-Méneville, 1857^{i c g}
- Trochoideus masoni Strohecker, 1978^{i c g}
- Trochoideus mexicanus Strohecker, 1978^{i c g}
- Trochoideus peruvianus Kirsch, 1876^{i c g}
- Trochoideus venezuelensis Joly and Bordon, 1996^{i c g}

Data sources: i = ITIS, c = Catalogue of Life, g = GBIF, b = Bugguide.net
