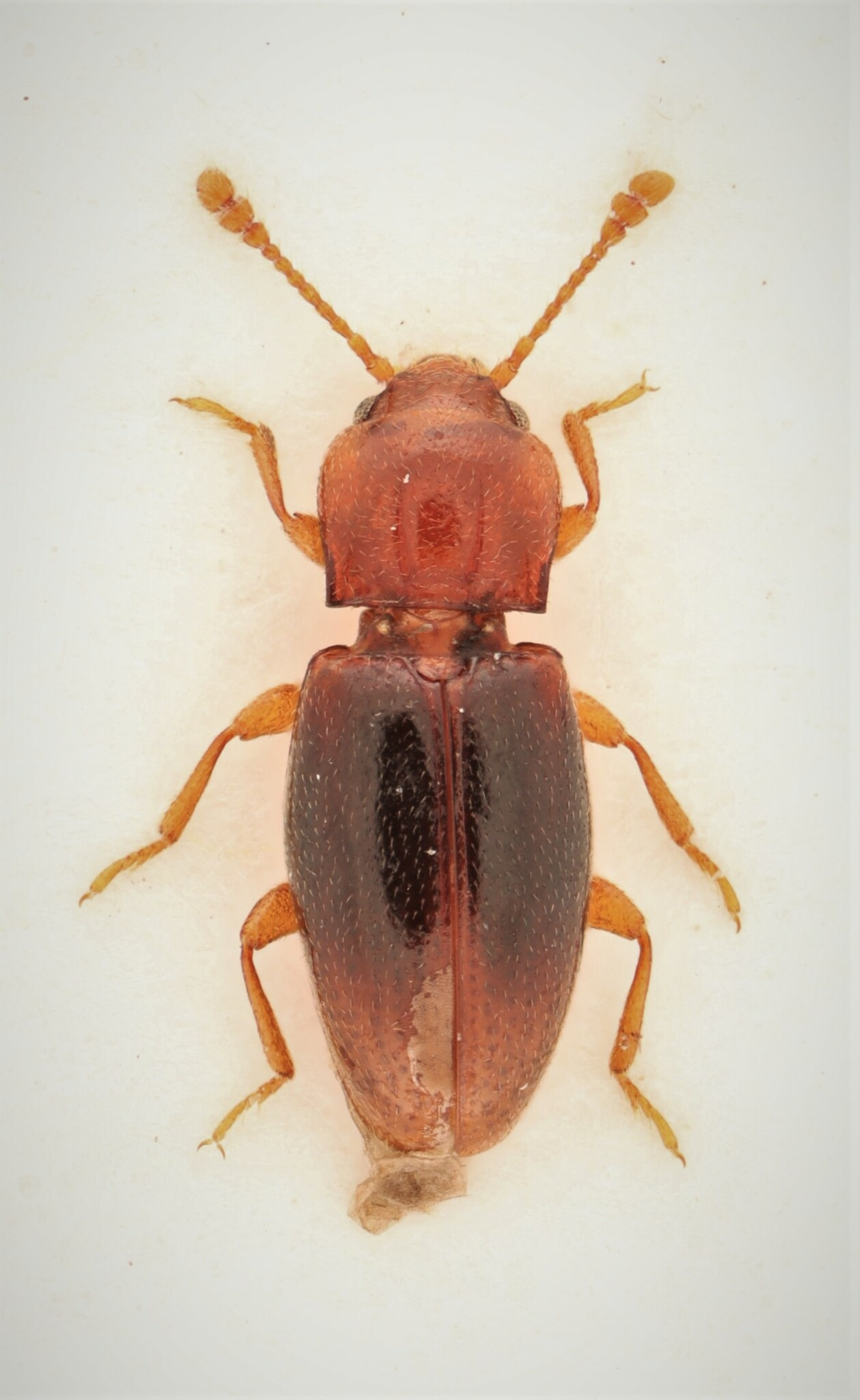

Scientific classification
- Kingdom: Animalia
- Phylum: Arthropoda
- Clade: Pancrustacea
- Class: Insecta
- Order: Coleoptera
- Suborder: Polyphaga
- Infraorder: Cucujiformia
- Family: Endomychidae
- Subfamily: Leiestinae
- Genus: Rhanidea; Strohecker, 1953

= Rhanidea =

Genus of beetles

Rhanidea is a genus of handsome fungus beetles in the family Endomychidae. There is one described species in Rhanidea, R. unicolor.
