= Chondria (beetle) =

Scientific classification
- Kingdom: Animalia
- Phylum: Arthropoda
- Class: Insecta
- Order: Coleoptera
- Suborder: Polyphaga
- Infraorder: Cucujiformia
- Family: Endomychidae
- Genus: Chondria; Strohecker, 1979

Species
- See text

Genus of beetles

Chondria is a genus of beetle in the family Endomychidae.

== Species ==
- Chondria affinis Arrow, 1943
- Chondria agilis Arrow, 1943
- Chondria apicalis Arrow, 1923
- Chondria araneola Arrow, 1925
- Chondria armipes Strohecker, 1978
- Chondria auritarsis Strohecker, 1978
- Chondria brevior Strohecker, 1978
- Chondria buruana Arrow, 1926
- Chondria cardiaca Strohecker, 1955
- Chondria elegans Strohecker, 1979
