= Mimolithophilus =

Scientific classification
- Kingdom: Animalia
- Phylum: Arthropoda
- Class: Insecta
- Order: Coleoptera
- Suborder: Polyphaga
- Infraorder: Cucujiformia
- Family: Coccinellidae
- Genus: Mimolithophilus; Arrow, 1920

Genus of beetles

Mimolithophilus is a genus of beetles belonging to the family Coccinellidae.

The species of this genus are found in Southern Africa.

It is one of the two genera of the tribe Monocorynini.

== Species ==
Species:

- Mimolithophilus alobatus
- Mimolithophilus brevicornis
- Mimolithophilus capensis
- Mimolithophilus carinatus
- Mimolithophilus costatus
- Mimolithophilus deplanatus
- Mimolithophilus glabratus
- Mimolithophilus saeptus
- Mimolithophilus sericeus
- Mimolithophilus whiteheadi
