= Saula (beetle) =

Scientific classification
- Domain: Eukaryota
- Kingdom: Animalia
- Phylum: Arthropoda
- Class: Insecta
- Order: Coleoptera
- Suborder: Polyphaga
- Infraorder: Cucujiformia
- Family: Endomychidae
- Genus: Saula; Gerstaecker, 1858

Genus of insects

Saula is a genus of beetles belonging to the family Endomychidae.

The species of this genus are found in Southeastern Asia and Japan.

Species:

- Saula chujoi Sasaji, 1970
- Saula japonica Gorham, 1874
- Saula nigripes Gerstaecker, 1858
- Saula taiwana Chujo, 1938
