= Henry Frederick Strohecker =

American entomologist

Henry Frederick Strohecker (October 15, 1905, Macon, Georgia - November 14, 1988, Coral Gables, Florida) was an American entomologist who specialised in Coleoptera especially Endomychidae.
