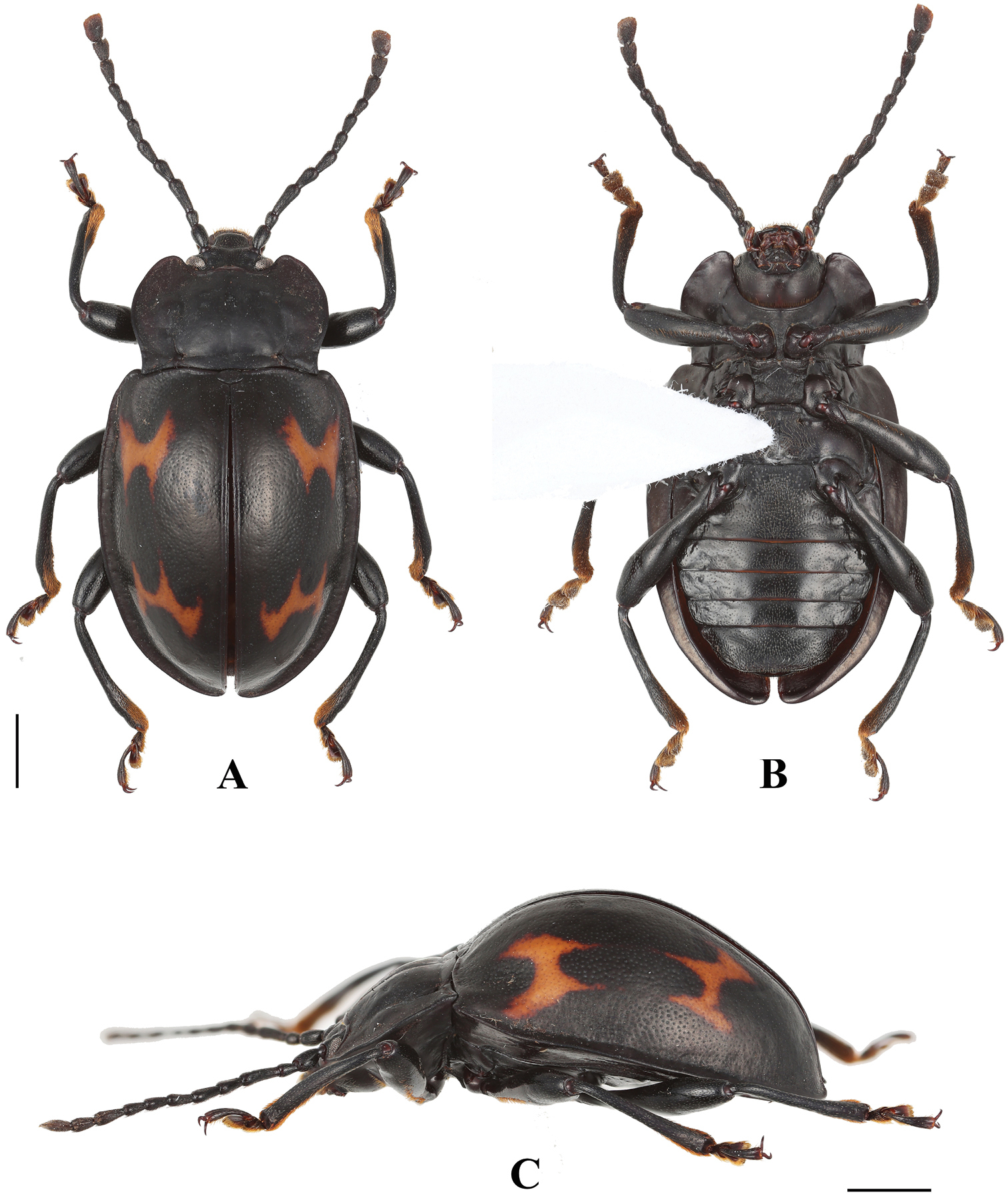
- Brachytrycherus humeralis

Scientific classification
- Kingdom: Animalia
- Phylum: Arthropoda
- Clade: Pancrustacea
- Class: Insecta
- Order: Coleoptera
- Suborder: Polyphaga
- Infraorder: Cucujiformia
- Superfamily: Coccinelloidea
- Family: Endomychidae; Leach, 1815

Type genus
- Endomychus

Synonyms
- Merophysiidae Seidlitz, 1872

= Endomychidae =

Endomychidae Temporal range: Cenomanian–Recent

Family of beetles

Endomychidae, also commonly known as handsome fungus beetles, is a family of coccinelloid beetles with representatives found in all biogeographic realms. As the common name suggests, members of this family feed on fungi.

== Description ==
They have a tarsal formal of 4-4-4 or 3-3-3 and the wings lack a closed radial cell. The second antennal segment has a sensory appendage that is as long as the third antennal segment.

== Taxonomy ==
The family was established based on the type genus Endomychus, a genus erected in 1795 by Panzer which was applied to a species that Linnaeus called Chrysomela coccinea.

Crowson, in his influential treatment of the beetles, placed the family within the Cucujoidea. The family has also been grouped with the Coccinellidae in a group called the Trimera for having pseudotrimerous tarsi. A 2015 molecular phylogeny study found that the Cucujoidea were found to be non-monophyletic and the Endomychidae was refined with the removal of the Anamorphinae from within the family and elevated to the status of a full family, Anamorphidae. Mycetaeinae and Eupsilobiinae were also found not to belong within the clades of the core Endomychidae, and likewise reclassified into the families Mycetaeidae and Eupsilobiidae.

This family contains around 120 genera and 1300 species. A list of subfamilies can be seen below:

The subfamilies that are included:

- Danascelinae
- Endomychinae (including Stenotarsinae)
- Epipocinae
- Leiestinae
- Lycoperdininae
- Merophysiinae
- Pleganophorinae
- Xenomycetinae

=== Genera ===
Genera traditionally placed in family Endomychidae as defined in the past (due to revisions, this may not be entirely accurate):

- Acinaces Gerstaecker, 1858^{g}
- Agaricophilus Motschulsky, 1838^{g}
- Amphisternus Germar, 1843^{g}
- Amphistethus Strohecker, 1964^{g}
- Ancylopus Costa, 1854^{g}
- Anidrytus Gerstaecker, 1858^{i c g}
- Aphorista Gorham, 1873^{i c g b}
- Archipines Strohecker, 1953^{i c g}
- Atopomychus Tomaszewska & Szawaryn, 2013^{g}
- Atrichonota Arrow, 1925^{g}
- Avencymon Strohecker, 1971^{g}
- Beccariola Arrow, 1943^{g}
- Bolbomorphus Gorham, 1888^{g}
- Brachytrycherus Arrow, 1920^{g}
- Cholovocera Motschulsky, 1838^{g}
- Chondria Gorham, 1888^{g}
- Corynomalus Chevrolat in Dejean, 1836^{i c g}
- Cyclotoma Mulsant, 1851^{i g}
- Danae Reiche, 1847^{i c g b}
- Danascelis Tomaszewska, 1999^{i c g}
- Dapsa Latreille, 1829^{g}
- Dialexia Gorham, 1891^{g}
- Discolomopsis Shockley, 2006^{g}
- Displotera Reitter, 1877^{g}
- Ectomychus Gorham, 1888^{g}
- Eidorus^{g}
- Endomychus Panzer, 1795^{i c g b}
- Ephebus Chevrolat in Dejean, 1836^{i c g}
- Epipocus Germar, 1843^{i c g b}
- Epopterus Chevrolat in Dejean, 1836^{i c g}
- Eucteanus Gerstaecker, 1857^{g}
- Eucymon^{g}
- Eumorphus Weber, 1801^{g}
- Glesirhanis Shockley & Alekseev, 2014^{g}
- Hadromychus Bousquet & Leschen, 2002^{i c g b}
- Holoparamecus Curtis, 1833^{i c g b}
- Hylaia Guerin, 1857^{g}
- Hylaperdina Tomaszewska, 2012^{g}
- Indalmus Gerstaecker, 1858^{g}
- Leiestes Chevrolat, 1836^{g}
- Lycoperdina Latreille, 1807^{i c g b}
- Meilichius Gerstaecker, 1857^{g}
- Merophysia Lucas, 1852^{g}
- Microxenus Wallaston, 1861^{g}
- Mycetina Mulsant, 1846^{i c g b}
- Natalinus Tomaszewska, 2011^{g}
- Ohtaius Chûjô, 1938^{g}
- Palaeoestes Kirejtshuk & Nel, 2009^{g}
- Paniegena Heller, 1916^{g}
- Phymaphora Newman, 1838^{i c g b}
- Phymaphoroides Motschoulsky, 1857^{g}
- Pleganophorus Hampe, 1855^{g}
- Polymus Mulsant, 1846^{g}
- Pseudindalmus Arrow, 1920^{g}
- Rhanidea Strohecker, 1953^{i c g b}
- Saula Gerstaecker, 1858^{i c g}
- Sinocymbachus Strohecker & Chujo, 1970^{g}
- Sinopanamomus Esser, 2019
- Stenotarsus Perty, 1832^{i c g b}
- Stethorhanis Blaisdell, 1931^{i c g}
- Trochoideus Westwood, 1833^{i c g b}
- Trycherus Gerstaecker, 1857^{g}
- Xenomycetes Horn, 1880^{i c g b}

Data sources: i = ITIS, c = Catalogue of Life, g = GBIF, b = Bugguide.net

Mimolithophilus and Monocoryna are now placed in Coccinellidae.

=== Fossil genera ===
- Burmalestes Tomaszewska and Ślipiński, 2018 Burmese amber, Myanmar, Late Cretaceous (Cenomanian)
- Cretolestes Tomaszewska, Ślipiński and Ren, 2018 Burmese amber, Myanmar, Cenomanian
- Cretaparamecus Tomaszewska, Ślipiński, Bai and Zhang, 2018 Burmese amber, Myanmar, Cenomanian
- Palaeomycetes Tomaszewska, Ślipiński and Ren, 2018 Burmese amber, Myanmar, Cenomanian
- Zemyna Tomaszewska, 2018 (replaced name Laima Alekseev and Tomaszewska, 2018): Baltic amber, Eocene
