= List of taxa that use parthenogenesis =

Parthenogenesis is a form of asexual reproduction in which the embryo develops directly from an egg without need for fertilization. It occurs in many eukaryote taxa.

== Taxa ==
=== Oomycetes ===
Apomixis appears to occur in Phytophthora, an oomycete. Oospores from an experimental cross were germinated, and some of the progeny were genetically identical to one or other parent, implying that meiosis did not occur and the oospores developed by parthenogenesis.

=== Plants ===
Asexual or vegetative reproduction is common among plants.

=== Velvet worms ===
No males of Epiperipatus imthurni have been found, and specimens from Trinidad were shown to reproduce parthenogenetically, making it the only velvet worm known to use parthenogenesis.

=== Rotifers ===
In bdelloid rotifers, females reproduce exclusively by parthenogenesis (obligate parthenogenesis), while in monogonont rotifers, females can alternate between sexual and asexual reproduction (cyclical parthenogenesis). At least in one normally cyclical parthenogenetic species obligate parthenogenesis can be inherited: a recessive allele leads to loss of sexual reproduction in homozygous offspring.

=== Flatworms ===
At least two species of flatworms in the genus Dugesia, include polyploid individuals that reproduce by parthenogenesis. This type of parthenogenesis requires mating, but the sperm does not contribute to the genetics of the offspring (the parthenogenesis is pseudogamous, alternatively referred to as gynogenetic). A complex cycle of matings between diploid sexual and polyploid parthenogenetic individuals produces new parthenogenetic lines.

=== Snails ===
Several species of parthenogenetic gastropods have been studied, especially with respect to their status as invasive species. These include the New Zealand mud snail (Potamopyrgus antipodarum), the red-rimmed melania (Melanoides tuberculata), and the Quilted melania (Tarebia granifera).

=== Insects ===
Parthenogenesis in insects can cover a wide range of mechanisms. The offspring produced by parthenogenesis may be of both sexes, only female (thelytoky, e.g., aphids and some hymenopterans) or only male (arrhenotoky, e.g., most hymenopterans). Both true parthenogenesis and pseudogamy (gynogenesis or sperm-dependent parthenogenesis) are known to occur. The egg cells, depending on the species may be produced without meiosis (apomictically) or by one of the several automictic mechanisms.

A related phenomenon, polyembryony is a process that produces multiple clonal offspring from a single egg cell. This is known in some hymenopteran parasitoids and in Strepsiptera. In automictic species the offspring can be haploid or diploid. Diploids are produced by doubling or fusion of gametes after meiosis. Fusion is seen in the Phasmatodea, Hemiptera (Aleurodids and Coccidae), Diptera, and some Hymenoptera. In addition to these forms is hermaphroditism, where both the eggs and sperm are produced by the same individual, but is not a type of parthenogenesis. This is seen in three species of Icerya scale insects. Parasitic bacteria like Wolbachia induce automictic thelytoky in many insect species with haplodiploid systems. They cause gamete duplication in unfertilized eggs causing them to develop into female offspring.

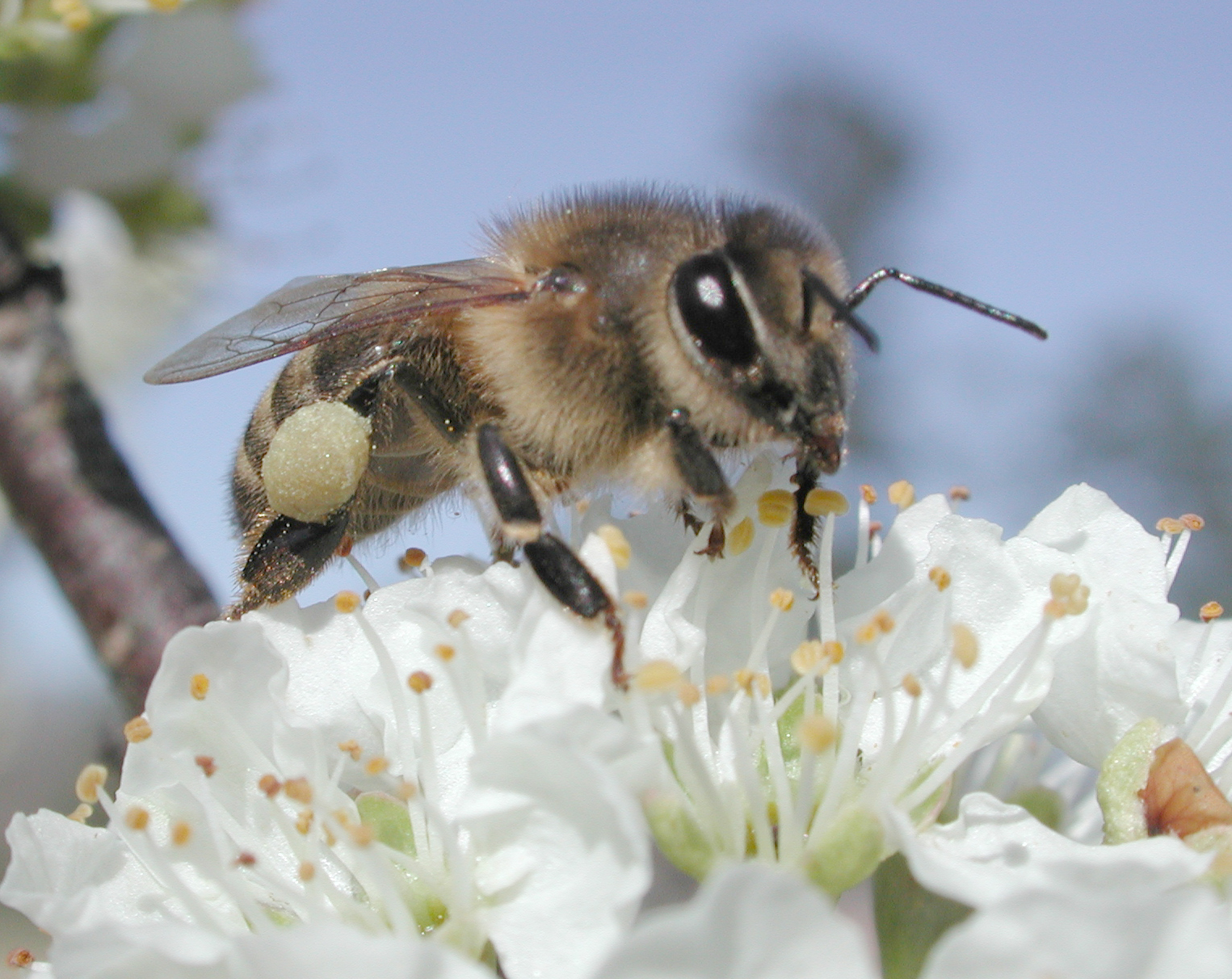
Honey bee on a plum blossom

Among species with the haplo-diploid sex-determination system, such as hymenopterans (ants, bees, and wasps) and thysanopterans (thrips), haploid males are produced from unfertilized eggs. Usually, eggs are laid only by the queen, but the unmated workers may also lay haploid, male eggs either regularly (e.g. stingless bees) or under special circumstances. An example of non-viable parthenogenesis is common among domesticated honey bees. The queen bee is the only fertile female in the hive; if she dies without the possibility of a viable replacement queen, it is not uncommon for the worker bees to lay eggs. This is a result of the lack of the queen's pheromones and the pheromones secreted by uncapped brood, which normally suppress ovarian development in workers. Worker bees are unable to mate, and the unfertilized eggs produce only drones (males), which can mate only with a queen. Thus, in a relatively short period, all the worker bees die off, and the new drones follow if they have not been able to mate before the collapse of the colony. This behavior is believed to have evolved to allow a doomed colony to produce drones which may mate with a virgin queen and thus preserve the colony's genetic progeny.

A few ants and bees are capable of producing diploid female offspring parthenogenetically. These include a honey bee subspecies from South Africa, Apis mellifera capensis, where workers are capable of producing diploid eggs parthenogenetically, and replacing the queen if she dies; other examples include some species of small carpenter bee, (genus Ceratina). Many parasitic wasps are known to be parthenogenetic, sometimes due to infections by Wolbachia.

The workers in five ant species and the queens in some ants are known to reproduce by parthenogenesis. In Cataglyphis cursor, a European formicine ant, the queens and workers can produce new queens by parthenogenesis. The workers are produced sexually.

In Central and South American electric ants, Wasmannia auropunctata, queens produce more queens through automictic parthenogenesis with central fusion. Sterile workers usually are produced from eggs fertilized by males. In some of the eggs fertilized by males, however, the fertilization can cause the female genetic material to be ablated from the zygote. In this way, males pass on only their genes to become fertile male offspring. This is the first recognized example of an animal species where both females and males can reproduce clonally resulting in a complete separation of male and female gene pools. As a consequence, the males only have fathers and the queens only mothers, while the sterile workers are the only ones with both parents of both sexes. These ants get the benefits of both asexual and sexual reproduction—the daughters who can reproduce (the queens) have all of the mother's genes, while the sterile workers whose physical strength and disease resistance are important are produced sexually.

Other examples of insect parthenogenesis can be found in gall-forming aphids (e.g., Pemphigus betae), where females reproduce parthenogenetically during the gall-forming phase of their life cycle and in grass thrips. In the grass thrips genus Aptinothrips there have been, despite the very limited number of species in the genus, several transitions to asexuality.

=== Crustaceans ===
Crustacean reproduction varies both across and within species. The water flea Daphnia pulex alternates between sexual and parthenogenetic reproduction. Among the better-known large decapod crustaceans, some crayfish reproduce by parthenogenesis. "Marmorkrebs" are parthenogenetic crayfish that were discovered in the pet trade in the 1990s. Offspring are genetically identical to the parent, indicating it reproduces by apomixis, i.e. parthenogenesis in which the eggs did not undergo meiosis. Spinycheek crayfish (Orconectes limosus) can reproduce both sexually and by parthenogenesis. The Louisiana red swamp crayfish (Procambarus clarkii), which normally reproduces sexually, has also been suggested to reproduce by parthenogenesis, although no individuals of this species have been reared this way in the lab. Artemia parthenogenetica is a species or series of populations of parthenogenetic brine shrimps.

=== Spiders ===
At least two species of spiders in the family Oonopidae (goblin spiders), Heteroonops spinimanus and Triaeris stenaspis, are thought to be parthenogenetic, as no males have ever been collected. Parthenogenetic reproduction has been demonstrated in the laboratory for T. stenaspis.

=== Sharks ===
Parthenogenesis in sharks has been confirmed in at least three species, the bonnethead, the blacktip shark, and the zebra shark.

A bonnethead, a type of small hammerhead shark, was found to have produced a pup, born live in 2001 at Henry Doorly Zoo in Nebraska, in a tank containing three female hammerheads, but no males. The pup was thought to have been conceived through parthenogenesis. It was concluded after DNA testing that the reproduction was parthenogenetic, as the female pup's DNA matched only one female who lived in the tank, and no male DNA was present in the pup. The pup was not a twin or clone of her mother, but rather, contained only half of her mother's DNA ("automictic parthenogenesis"). This type of reproduction had been seen before in bony fish, but not in cartilaginous fish such as sharks.

In the same year, a female Atlantic blacktip shark in Virginia reproduced via parthenogenesis. On 10 October 2008, scientists confirmed the second case of a "virgin birth" in a shark. The Journal of Fish Biology reported a study in which scientists said DNA testing proved that a pup carried by a female Atlantic blacktip shark in the Virginia Aquarium & Marine Science Center contained no genetic material from a male.

In 2002, two white-spotted bamboo sharks were born at the Belle Isle Aquarium in Detroit. They hatched 15 weeks after being laid in an aquarium containing only two female sharks.

In 2011, recurring shark parthenogenesis over several years was demonstrated in a captive zebra shark, a type of carpet shark. DNA genotyping demonstrated that individual zebra sharks can switch from sexual to parthenogenetic reproduction.

=== Rays ===
A female round stingray (Urobatis halleri) held in captivity from all males for eight years was reported pregnant in 2024. In June 2024, the aquarium where the ray resided reported that she was not pregnant, and instead had a rare reproductive disease.

=== Crocodiles ===
In June 2023, discovery was made at a zoo in Costa Rica, where researchers identified the first documented case of a self-pregnant crocodile. This female American crocodile, housed at Parque Reptilania, produced a genetically identical foetus, with a 99.9% similarity to herself. The scientists speculate that this unique ability might be inherited from an evolutionary ancestor, suggesting that even dinosaurs could have possessed the capability for self-reproduction. The 18-year-old crocodile laid the egg in January 2018, the fully formed foetus did not hatch and was stillborn. Notably, this crocodile had been kept separated from other crocodiles throughout her entire life since being acquired at the age of two.

=== Lizards and snakes ===
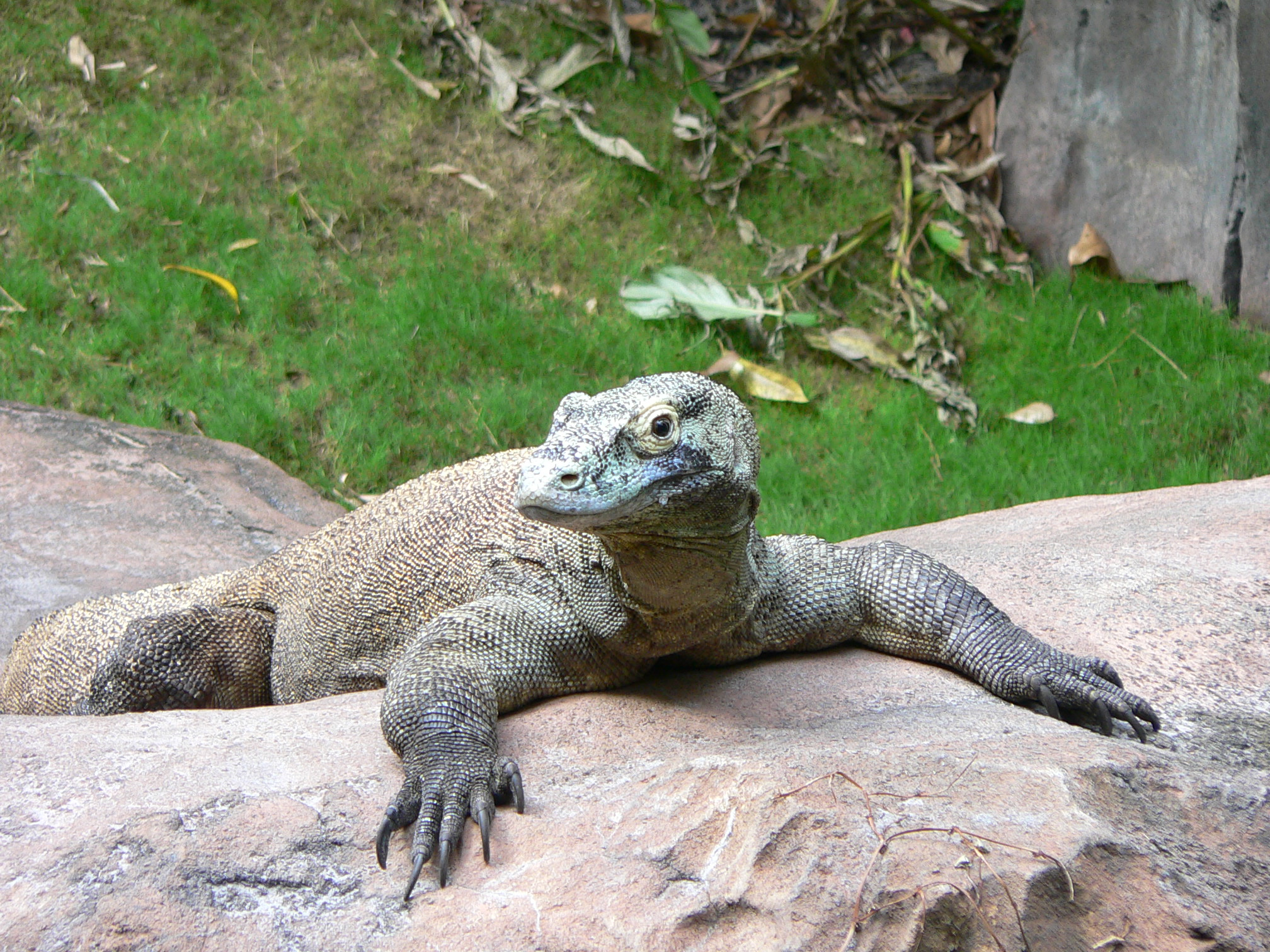
Komodo dragon, Varanus komodoensis, rarely reproduces via parthenogenesis.

Most reptiles of the squamata (lizards and snakes) reproduce sexually, but parthenogenesis occurs naturally in certain whiptails, some geckos, rock lizards, Komodo dragons, and snakes. Some of these, like the mourning gecko Lepidodactylus lugubris, Indo-Pacific house gecko Hemidactylus garnotii, the hybrid whiptails Cnemidophorus, Caucasian rock lizards Darevskia, and the brahminy blindsnake, Indotyphlops braminus are unisexual and obligately parthenogenetic. Other reptiles, such as the Komodo dragon, other monitor lizards, and some species of boas, pythons, filesnakes, gartersnakes, and rattlesnakes were previously considered as cases of facultative parthenogenesis, but may be cases of accidental parthenogenesis.

In 2012, facultative parthenogenesis was reported in wild vertebrates for the first time by US researchers amongst captured pregnant copperhead and cottonmouth female pit-vipers. The Komodo dragon, which normally reproduces sexually, has also been found able to reproduce asexually by parthenogenesis. A case has been documented of a Komodo dragon reproducing via sexual reproduction after a known parthenogenetic event, highlighting that these cases of parthenogenesis are reproductive accidents, rather than adaptive, facultative parthenogenesis.

Some reptile species use a ZW chromosome system, which produces either males (ZZ) or females (ZW). Until 2010, it was thought that the ZW chromosome system used by reptiles was incapable of producing viable WW offspring, but a (ZW) female boa constrictor was discovered to have produced viable female offspring with WW chromosomes.

Parthenogenesis has been studied extensively in the New Mexico whiptail in the genus Aspidoscelis of which 15 species reproduce exclusively by parthenogenesis. These lizards live in the dry and sometimes harsh climate of the southwestern United States and northern Mexico. All these asexual species appear to have arisen through the hybridization of two or three of the sexual species in the genus leading to polyploid individuals. The mechanism by which the mixing of chromosomes from two or three species can lead to parthenogenetic reproduction is unknown. Recently, a hybrid parthenogenetic whiptail lizard was bred in the laboratory from a cross between an asexual and a sexual whiptail. Because multiple hybridization events can occur, individual parthenogenetic whiptail species can consist of multiple independent asexual lineages. Within lineages, there is very little genetic diversity, but different lineages may have quite different genotypes.

An interesting aspect to reproduction in these asexual lizards is that mating behaviors are still seen, although the populations are all female. One female plays the role played by the male in closely related species, and mounts the female that is about to lay eggs. This behaviour is due to the hormonal cycles of the females, which cause them to behave like males shortly after laying eggs, when levels of progesterone are high, and to take the female role in mating before laying eggs, when estrogen dominates. Lizards who act out the courtship ritual have greater fecundity than those kept in isolation, due to the increase in hormones that accompanies the mounting. So, although the populations lack males, they still require sexual behavioral stimuli for maximum reproductive success.

Some lizard parthenogens show a pattern of geographic parthenogenesis, occupying high mountain areas where their ancestral forms have an inferior competition ability. In Caucasian rock lizards of genus Darevskia, which have six parthenogenetic forms of hybrid origin hybrid parthenogenetic form D. "dahli" has a broader niche than either of its bisexual ancestors and its expansion throughout the Central Lesser Caucasus caused decline of the ranges of both its maternal and paternal species.

=== Birds ===
Parthenogenesis in birds is known mainly from studies of domesticated turkeys and chickens, although it has also been noted in the domestic pigeon. In most cases the egg fails to develop normally or completely to hatching. The first description of parthenogenetic development in a passerine was demonstrated in captive zebra finches, although the dividing cells exhibited irregular nuclei and the eggs did not hatch.

Parthenogenesis in turkeys appears to result from a conversion of haploid cells to diploid; most embryos produced in this way die early in development. Rarely, viable birds result from this process, and the rate at which this occurs in turkeys can be increased by selective breeding, but male turkeys produced from parthenogenesis have smaller testes and reduced fertility.

In 2021, the San Diego Zoo reported that they had two unfertilized eggs from their California condor breeding program hatch. This is the first known example of parthenogenesis in this species, as well as one of the only known examples of parthenogenesis happening where males are still present.

=== Mammals ===
There are no known cases of naturally occurring mammalian parthenogenesis in the wild. Parthenogenetic progeny of mammals would have two X chromosomes, and would therefore be genetically female. In 1936, Gregory Goodwin Pincus induced parthenogenesis in a rabbit. In 2004, scientists at Tokyo University of Agriculture used parthenogenesis to create a fatherless mouse. Using gene targeting, they were able to manipulate two imprinted loci H19/IGF2 and DLK1/MEG3 to produce bi-maternal mice at high frequency and subsequently show that fatherless mice have enhanced longevity.
