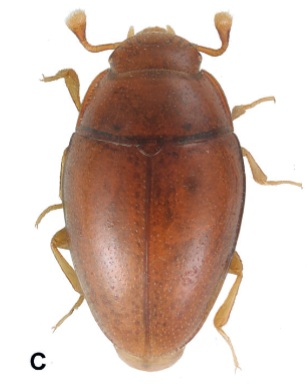

Scientific classification
- Kingdom: Animalia
- Phylum: Arthropoda
- Class: Insecta
- Order: Coleoptera
- Suborder: Polyphaga
- Infraorder: Cucujiformia
- Family: Endomychidae
- Genus: Cholovocera
- Species: C. balcanica

Binomial name
- Cholovocera balcanica (Karaman, 1936)

Synonyms
- Reitteria balcanica Karaman, 1936

= Cholovocera balcanica =

Species of beetle

Cholovocera balcanica is a species of beetle of the family Endomychidae. The range of this species extends from the Balkan Peninsula in the west to eastern Turkey and from the northern Black Sea coast and the Crimean Peninsula in the north to Crete and other Greek islands in the south.

== Description ==
Adults reach a length of about 1.30–1.50 mm and have an elliptical body.

== Biology ==
This species is associated with species of the Messor genus in Albania and Greece, with Messor structor in Bulgaria, and possibly with Camponotus ligniperda.
