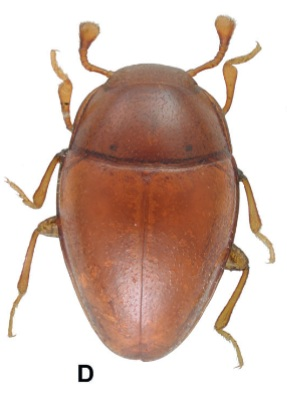

Scientific classification
- Kingdom: Animalia
- Phylum: Arthropoda
- Class: Insecta
- Order: Coleoptera
- Suborder: Polyphaga
- Infraorder: Cucujiformia
- Family: Endomychidae
- Genus: Cholovocera
- Species: C. gallica

Binomial name
- Cholovocera gallica (Schaufuss, 1876)

Synonyms
- Coluocera gallica Schaufuss, 1876; Coluocera fleischeri Reitter, 1902

= Cholovocera gallica =

Species of beetle

Cholovocera gallica is a species of beetle of the family Endomychidae. The range of this species extends from the Balkans in the east to Catalonia in the west, and from northern Italy to Algeria and Tunisia in the south.

== Description ==
Adults reach a length of about 1.30–1.50 mm and have an oval body.

== Biology ==
This species is associated with species of the Messor genus in southern France, Andalusia, Sardinia and Sicily, with Messor barbarus in Spain, with an unidentified species of Camponotus in Sardinia and with an unidentified species of Tetramorium in Croatia.
