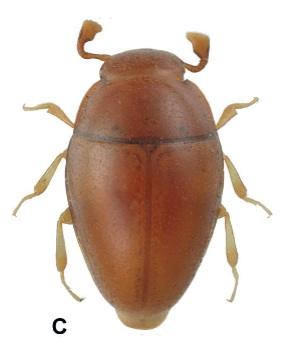

Scientific classification
- Kingdom: Animalia
- Phylum: Arthropoda
- Class: Insecta
- Order: Coleoptera
- Suborder: Polyphaga
- Infraorder: Cucujiformia
- Family: Endomychidae
- Genus: Cholovocera
- Species: C. occulta

Binomial name
- Cholovocera occulta Delgado & Palma, 2023

= Cholovocera occulta =

Species of beetle

Cholovocera occulta is a species of beetle of the family Endomychidae. The range of this species extends from the Mediterranean coast of France in the north, to the Mediterranean coast of Algeria in the south.

== Description ==
Adults reach a length of about 1.30–1.40 mm and have an oval body.

== Biology ==
This species is associated with an unidentified Messor species, probably Messor barbarus.

== Etymology ==
The species name is derived from Latin occulta (meaning hidden) and refers to the fact that this species has remained undescribed and unnamed, despite being available for study in several well-known European museums during many years. The name also alludes to the lifestyle of these beetles, hidden inside ant nests.
