= Androgenesis =

Form of reproduction

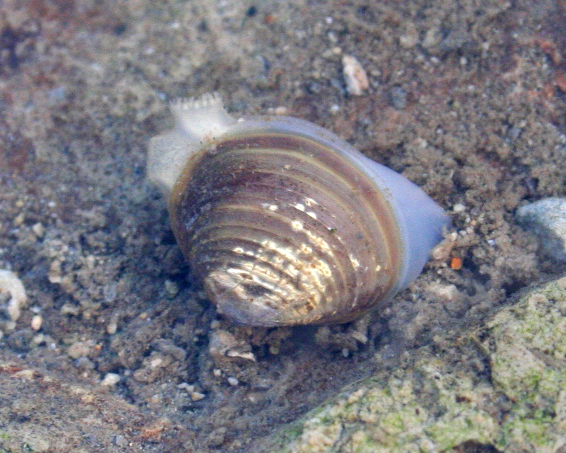
Corbicula leana is one of the species of its genus known to be capable of reproducing androgenetically without females.

Androgenesis is a system of asexual reproduction that requires the presence of eggs and occurs when a zygote is produced with only paternal nuclear genes. During standard sexual reproduction, one female parent and one male parent each produce haploid gametes (such as a sperm or egg cell, each containing only a single set of chromosomes), which recombine to create offspring with genetic material from both parents. However, in androgenesis, there is no recombination of maternal and paternal chromosomes, and only the paternal chromosomes are passed down to the offspring. (The inverse of this is the more common gynogenesis, where only the maternal chromosomes are inherited). The offspring produced in androgenesis still have maternally inherited mitochondria, as is the case with most sexually reproducing species.

One of two things can occur to produce offspring with exclusively paternal genetic material: the maternal nuclear genome can be eliminated from the zygote, or the female can produce an egg with no nucleus, resulting in an embryo developing with only the genome of the male gamete. Although androgenesis requires both male and females gametes, it is not strictly considered a form of sexual reproduction because the offspring have uniparental nuclear DNA that has not undergone recombination, and the proliferation of androgenesis can lead to exclusively asexually reproducing species.

Androgenesis occurs in nature in many organisms such as plants (including trees, flowers, barley, algae or corn), invertebrates (including clams, stick insects, some ants, bees, flies and parasitic wasps) and vertebrates (mainly amphibians and fish). Androgenesis has also been observed in genetically modified laboratory mice.

== Elimination of the maternal nuclear genome ==
When androgenesis occurs via elimination of the maternal nuclear genome, the elimination takes place after fertilization. The nuclei of the two gametes fuse as normal, but immediately afterwards the male nuclear genome then eliminates the female nuclear genome, leaving a fertilized ovum with only the nuclear genome of the male parent. If viable, the resulting offspring is a clone or sub-clone of the sperm- or pollen-producing parent.

Elimination of the maternal nuclear genome is evolutionarily advantageous for the male parent, because all offspring produced have entirely paternally-inherited alleles: in contrast, a male parent that reproduces sexually without androgenesis only passes down half of its genetic material to each of its offspring. A male allele promoting the elimination of the female gametic nucleus therefore has a high fitness advantage and can spread through a population and even reach fixation. However, this may be part of the reason androgenesis is very rarely observed in nature: despite being advantageous to the individual producing offspring, it is deleterious to the population as a whole: if an androgenesis-inducing allele reaches high frequencies, egg-producing individuals become rare. Because both egg- and sperm-producers are necessary for androgenesis, if the sex ratio becomes highly unbalanced and there are too few egg-producers, the population is driven to extinction.

== Female production of non-nuclear eggs ==
Androgenesis can occur through female production of an egg without a nucleus. Upon fertilization with pollen or sperm, there is no maternal nucleus to expel, and a zygote is produced that derives its nuclear genome entirely from its paternal parent. It is unclear why production of non-nucleate eggs would have evolved, because there is no fitness advantage to the egg parent: none of its nuclear genes are being passed onto its offspring. Therefore, any female allele causing non-nucleate egg production would be highly disadvantageous. This form of androgenesis could spread through genetic drift, or there may be some unknown benefit to the egg-producing parent. Species in which non-nucleate egg production occurs are less likely to go extinct than species where the maternal nuclear genome is eliminated. This is because females producing non-nucleate eggs are disfavored by natural selection, so their proportion in a population remains low.

== Male apomixis ==
Another type of androgenesis is male apomixis, which is a reproductive process in which a plant develops from a sperm cell (male gamete) without the participation of a female cell (ovum). In this process, the zygote is formed solely with genetic material from the father, resulting in offspring genetically identical to the male organism. This has been noted in many plants such as Nicotiana, Capsicum frutescens, Cicer arietinum, Poa arachnifera, Cupressus sempervirens, Solanum verrucosum, Phaeophyceae, Elodea canadensis, Barleys,Tripsacum dactyloides, and Zea mays, and occurs as the regular reproductive method in Cupressus dupreziana. This contrasts with the more common apomixis, where development occurs without fertilization, but with genetic material only from the mother.

There are clonal species that reproduce through vegetative reproduction such as Lomatia tasmanica, Lagarostrobos franklinii, and Pando, where the genetic material is exclusively male.

== Obligate androgenesis ==
Obligate androgenesis is the process by which males are only able to produce offspring exclusively through male genetic material, where mating with females of related species is not necessary to produce offspring. This leads to these species being able to survive in the absence of females. They are also capable of interbreeding with sexual and other androgenetic lineages in a phenomenon sometimes referred to as egg parasitism or androgenetic parasitism. This method of reproduction is relatively rare and has been found in several species of clams of the genus Corbicula, some plants like Elodea canadensis, Cupressus dupreziana, Lomatia tasmanica, Lagarostrobos franklinii, and Pando, algae of the genus Phaeophyceae, and recently in the all-male fish species Squalius alburnoides.

== Ploidy ==
Individuals produced through androgenesis can be either haploid or diploid (having one or two sets of chromosomes, respectively), depending on the species. Diploidy occurs through either the fusion of two haploid sperm cells or the duplication of chromosomes from one haploid sperm cell. In both cases, the offspring experience a loss of genetic variation: individuals with the genome of 2 fused sperm cells will suffer from inbreeding depression, and individuals with the genome of a duplicated sperm cell will be fully homozygous. In species with male heterogamety (males have XY or XO chromosomes and females have XX, like in most mammals), the doubling of male chromosomes will cause all offspring to be female: if the sperm carries an X chromosome, the embryo must be XX, and if it carries a Y or O, the embryo will be YY or OO, and nonviable. With sperm fusion, a quarter of fertilized eggs will be female (XX), half will be male (XO or XY), and a quarter will be nonviable (YY or OO).

Androgenesis is more common in haplodiploid species, (where sex is determined by ploidy such that males generally develop from an unfertilized egg and females from a fertilized egg), than in diploid species (where all sexes are diploid). This is because with haplodiploids, there is no requirement of the doubling of chromosomes from a haploid gamete, so no embryos are lost due to YY or OO chromosomes.

== Xenoparous reproduction ==
Xenoparity in Messor ibericus

The harvester ant Messor ibericus lays eggs of two species. The females require sperm of a different species, M. structor, to create workers, obtaining the males by obligate inter-species cloning. A female M. ibericus therefore produces males of two species, differing both genomically and morphologically. The mother's genome is purely M. ibericus. A 2025 study in Nature states that this implies male clonality, i.e. androgenesis. Sperm of both species were recovered from a queen's spermatheca. Mitochondria were all of the maternal type; the mismatch with the maternal nuclear genome is not found in M. structor colonies. The study suggests that this xenoparous system evolved some 5 million years ago, starting as sexual parasitism. The evolutionary scenario proposed is that initially, M. ibericus queens mated with and used the sperm from M. structor males. Later, M. ibericus queens acquired the ability to produce a clone of M. structor males inside M. ibericus colonies.

== In non-gonochoristic species ==
Androgenesis is more likely to persist in hermaphrodites than in species with two distinct sexes (gonochorists) because all individuals have the ability to produce ova, so the spread of androgenesis-promoting alleles causing egg-producers to become scarce is not an issue. Androgenesis is also seen more frequently in species that already have uncommon modes of reproduction such as hybridogenesis and parthenogenesis, and is sometimes seen in interspecies hybridization.

== Induced androgenesis ==
Humans sometimes induce androgenesis to create clonal lines in plants (specifically crops), fish, and silkworms. A common method of inducing androgenesis is through irradiation. Egg cells can have their nuclei inactivated by gamma ray, UV, or X-ray radiation before being fertilized with sperm or pollen. A 2015 study was successful in producing zebrafish androgenones by cold-shocking just-fertilized eggs, which prevents the first cleavage event that doubles the chromosome number after parthenogenesis, and then heat-shocking them to double their chromosome number.

== See also ==
- Parthenogenesis
- Parthenocarpy
