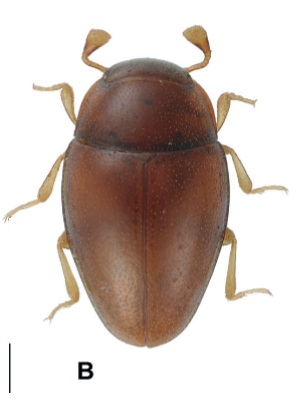

Scientific classification
- Kingdom: Animalia
- Phylum: Arthropoda
- Class: Insecta
- Order: Coleoptera
- Suborder: Polyphaga
- Infraorder: Cucujiformia
- Family: Endomychidae
- Genus: Cholovocera
- Species: C. attae

Binomial name
- Cholovocera attae (Kraatz, 1858)

Synonyms
- Choluocera attae Kraatz, 1858

= Cholovocera attae =

Species of beetle

Cholovocera attae is a species of beetle of the family Endomychidae. This species is found in Greece (Peloponnese, Crete) and western Turkey.

== Description ==
Adults reach a length of about 1.20–1.40 mm and have an oval body.

== Biology ==
This species is associated with an unidentified species of the Messor genus.
