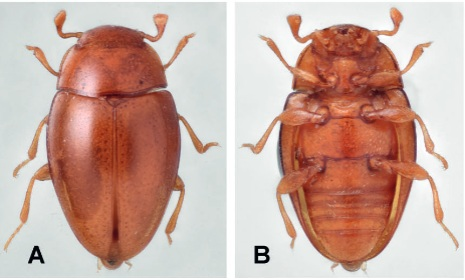

Scientific classification
- Kingdom: Animalia
- Phylum: Arthropoda
- Clade: Pancrustacea
- Class: Insecta
- Order: Coleoptera
- Suborder: Polyphaga
- Infraorder: Cucujiformia
- Family: Endomychidae
- Genus: Cholovocera
- Species: C. formicaria

Binomial name
- Cholovocera formicaria Victor, 1838

Synonyms
- Cholovocera subterranea Motchoulsky, 1845; Coluocera formicaria v. major Reitter 1887

= Cholovocera formicaria =

Species of beetle

Cholovocera formicaria is a species of beetle belonging to the family Endomychidae. The range of this species extends from the Caucasus Mountains and the Caspian Sea coast and from eastern Anatolia to north-eastern Iran.

== Description ==
Adults reach a length of about 1.43 mm and have an elliptical body.

== Biology ==
This species is associated with ants of the Tetramorium genus and Messor structor.
