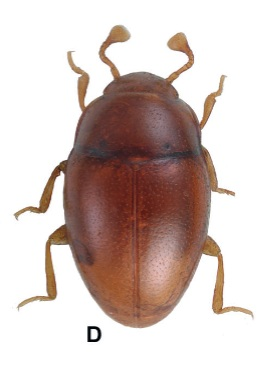

Scientific classification
- Kingdom: Animalia
- Phylum: Arthropoda
- Class: Insecta
- Order: Coleoptera
- Suborder: Polyphaga
- Infraorder: Cucujiformia
- Family: Endomychidae
- Genus: Cholovocera
- Species: C. punctata

Binomial name
- Cholovocera punctata Märkel, 1845

Synonyms
- Coluocera punctata sardoa Reitter, 1911

= Cholovocera punctata =

Species of beetle

Cholovocera punctata is a species of beetle of the family Endomychidae. The range of this species extends from southern France in the northwest, to Corsica, Sardinia, the west coast of continental Italy and Sicily in the east, and Algeria and Tunisia in the south.

== Description ==
Adults reach a length of about 1.30–1.50 mm and have an subelliptical body.

== Biology ==
This species is associated with ants. Besides its association with Messor barbarus, there are also records for associations with species of the following ant genera: Pheidole (Corsica and Sardinia), Camponotus (southern France and Sardinia), Cataglyphis (Sardinia and Algeria), Lasius (Corsica) and Aphaenogaster (Sardinia) and Tetramorium (Algeria).
