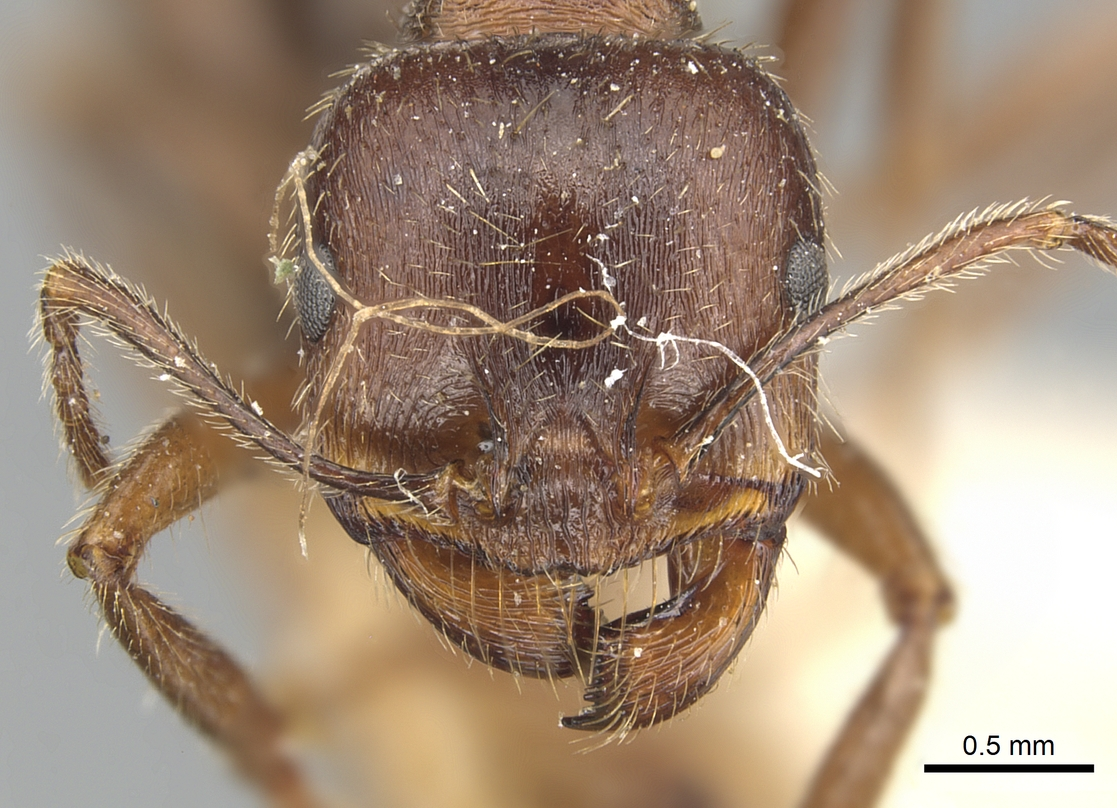
- Close up of the head of M. ibericus

Scientific classification
- Kingdom: Animalia
- Phylum: Arthropoda
- Clade: Pancrustacea
- Class: Insecta
- Order: Hymenoptera
- Family: Formicidae
- Subfamily: Myrmicinae
- Genus: Messor
- Species: M. ibericus

Binomial name
- Messor ibericus Santschi, 1931

= Messor ibericus =

Species of harvester ant

Messor ibericus, commonly known as the Iberian harvester ant, is a species of harvester ant in the subfamily Myrmicinae found throughout Europe, although they are found mostly in the Iberian Peninsula. They prefer open dry areas, such as scrub or grasslands, and feed on a variety of seeds.

== Description ==
M. ibericus are reddish brown in colour, workers and queens being 4–9 millimetres (0.16–0.35 in) and 9–10 millimetres (0.35–0.39 in) in length respectively. It has relatively small eyes. Males of this species can be distinguished from males of M. structor by the presence of hair (M. structor males are hairless).

== Xenoparity ==
Queens of M. ibericus can produce male offspring of the species Messor structor, which is not a sister species, by laying eggs that only contain DNA from M. structor in its nucleus. The nuclear DNA from the egg is removed, only keeping the nuclear DNA of the sperm, resulting in clonal reproduction for the males. This is required because the queen can only produce (female) worker ants using sperm from M. structor, making all workers hybrid. The queen can still create male offspring of her own species, but their sperm cannot produce workers, only queens. The term xenoparity was created to describe this ant, denoting production of offspring of a different species in order to support their life cycle.

Xenoparity has evolved from a form of sperm parasitism or sperm mutualism, in which one species depend on another's sperm for worker production. This relationship is usually disadvantageous for the species having the dependence as it forces them to live in places where the other species is present, but xenoparity appears to be one solution to the problem. (Some populations of M. ibericus have not yet evolved xenoparity and still require the acquisition of a M. structor male from outside the nest.) Among Messor harvester ants, there are many other cases of sperm parasitism. Some have evolved another solution to this problem: reciprocal sperm parasitism, where two species require the sperm from the other species in order to produce workers.
