= Asexual reproduction =

Reproduction without a sexual process

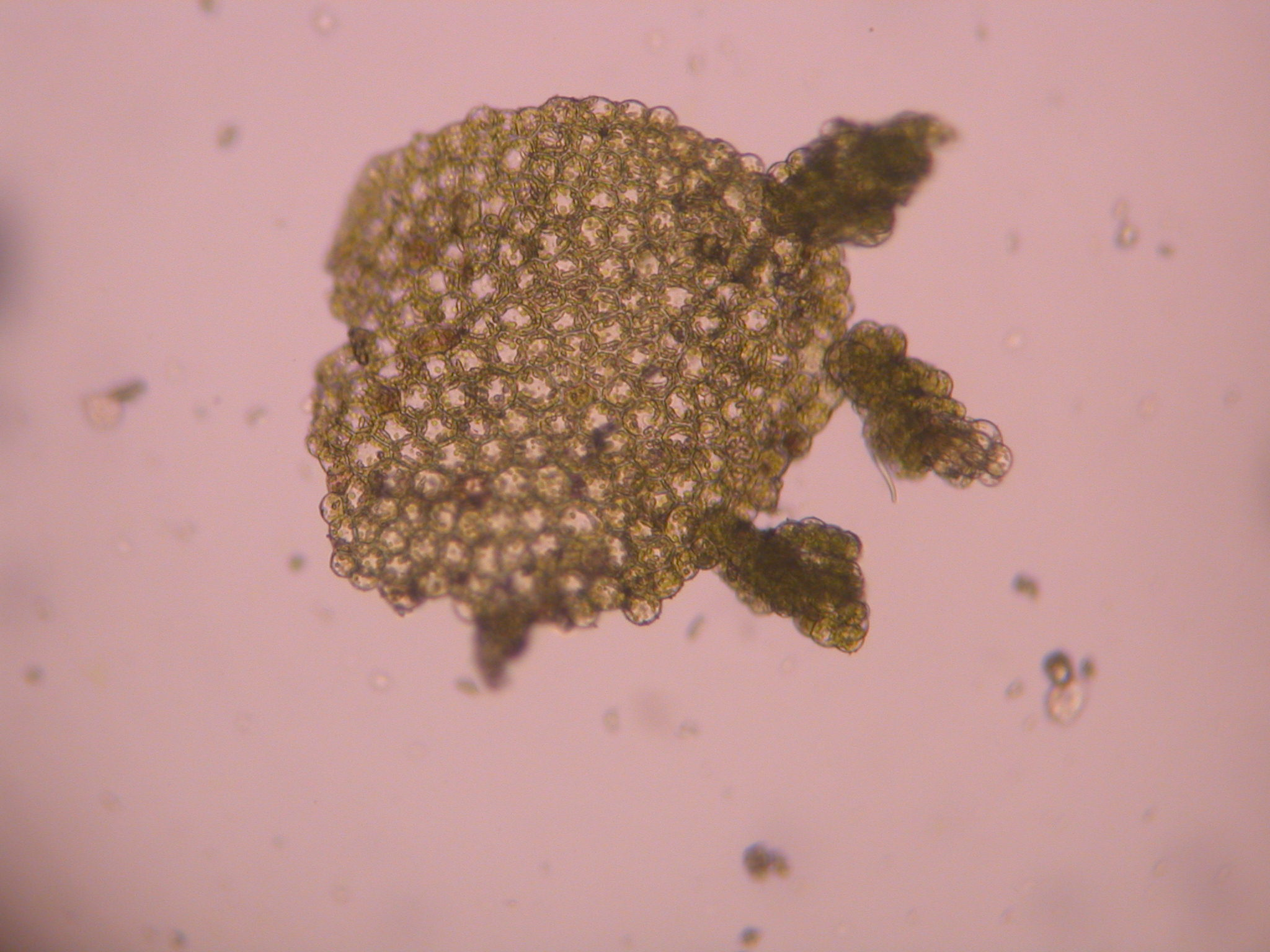
Asexual reproduction in liverworts: a caducous phylloid germinating

Asexual reproduction is a type of reproduction that does not involve the fusion of gametes or change in the number of chromosomes. The offspring that arise by asexual reproduction from either unicellular or multicellular organisms inherit the full set of genes of their single parent and thus the newly created individual is genetically and physically similar to the parent or an exact clone of the parent. Asexual reproduction is the primary form of reproduction for single-celled organisms such as archaea and bacteria. Many eukaryotic organisms including plants, animals, and fungi can also reproduce asexually. In vertebrates, the most common form of asexual reproduction is parthenogenesis, which is typically used as an alternative to sexual reproduction in times when reproductive opportunities are limited. Some monitor lizards, including Komodo dragons, can reproduce asexually.

While all prokaryotes reproduce without the formation and fusion of gametes, mechanisms for lateral gene transfer such as conjugation, transformation and transduction can be likened to sexual reproduction in the sense of genetic recombination in meiosis.

== Types of asexual reproduction ==
=== Fission ===
Prokaryotes (Archaea and Bacteria) reproduce asexually through binary fission, in which the parent organism divides in two to produce two genetically identical daughter organisms. Eukaryotes (such as protists and unicellular fungi) may reproduce in a functionally similar manner by mitosis; most of these are also capable of sexual reproduction.

Multiple fission at the cellular level occurs in many protists, e.g. sporozoans and algae. The nucleus of the parent cell divides several times by mitosis, producing several nuclei. The cytoplasm then separates, creating multiple daughter cells.

In apicomplexans, multiple fission, or schizogony appears either as merogony, sporogony or gametogony. Merogony results in merozoites, which are multiple daughter cells, that originate within the same cell membrane, sporogony results in sporozoites, and gametogony results in microgametes.

=== Budding ===
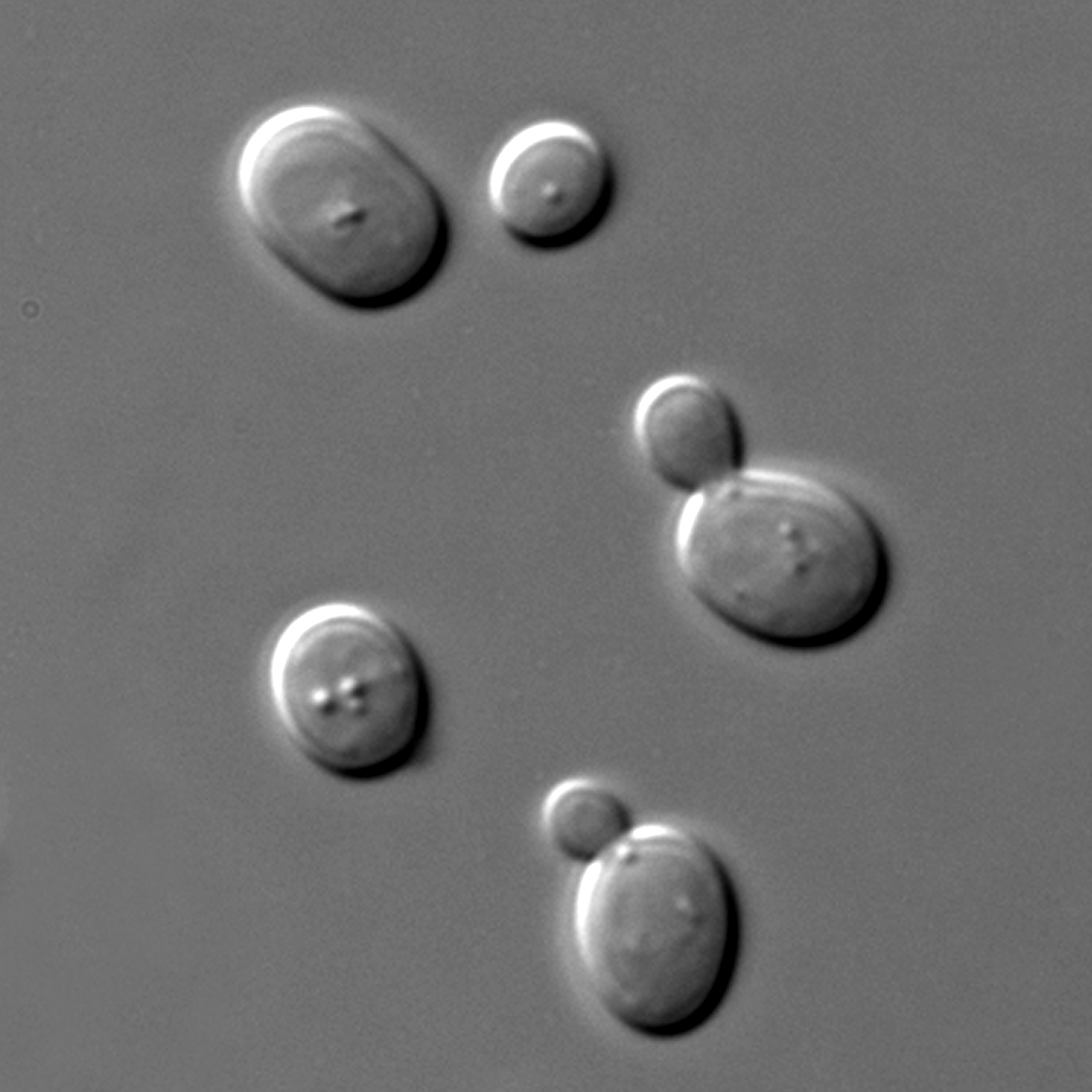
The yeast Saccharomyces cerevisiae reproducing by budding

Some cells divide by budding (for example baker's yeast), resulting in a "mother" and a "daughter" cell that is initially smaller than the parent. Budding is also known on a multicellular level; an animal example is the hydra, which reproduces by budding. The buds grow into fully matured individuals which eventually break away from the parent organism.

Internal budding is a process of asexual reproduction, favoured by parasites such as Toxoplasma gondii. It involves an unusual process in which two (endodyogeny) or more (endopolygeny) daughter cells are produced inside a mother cell, which is then consumed by the offspring prior to their separation.

Also, budding (external or internal) occurs in some worms like Taenia or Echinococcus; these worms produce cysts and then produce (invaginated or evaginated) protoscolex with budding.

=== Vegetative propagation ===
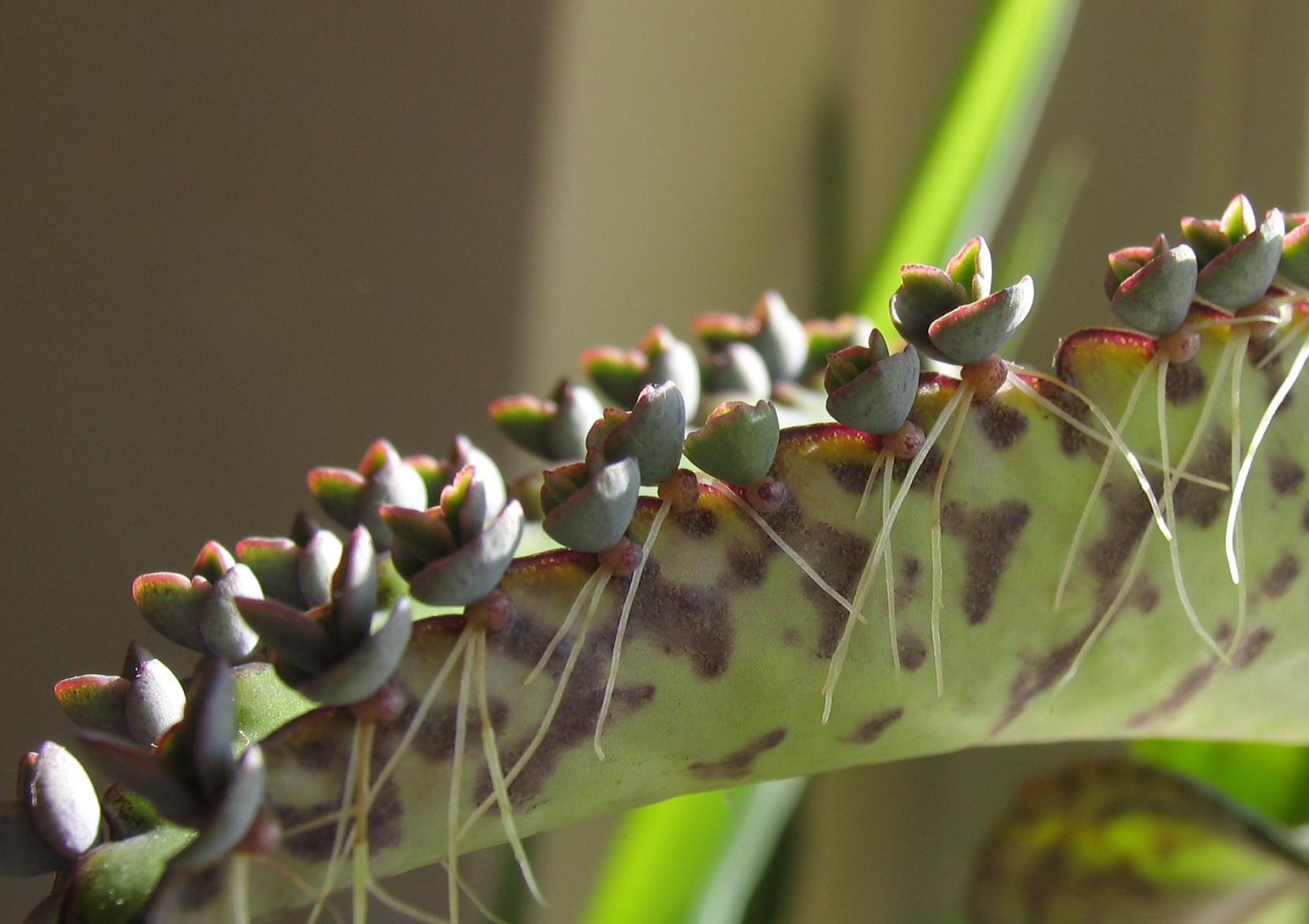
Vegetative plantlets of mother-of-thousands, Bryophyllum daigremontianum (Kalanchoe daigremontiana)

Vegetative propagation is a type of asexual reproduction found in plants where new individuals are formed without the production of seeds or spores and thus without syngamy or meiosis. Examples of vegetative reproduction include the formation of miniaturized plants called plantlets on specialized leaves, for example in kalanchoe (Bryophyllum daigremontianum) and many produce new plants from rhizomes or stolon (for example in strawberry). Some plants reproduce by forming bulbs or tubers, for example tulip bulbs and Dahlia tubers. In these examples, all the individuals are clones, and the clonal population may cover a large area.

=== Spore formation ===
Many multicellular organisms produce spores during their biological life cycle in a process called sporogenesis. Exceptions are animals and some protists, which undergo meiosis immediately followed by fertilization. Plants and many algae on the other hand undergo sporic meiosis where meiosis leads to the formation of haploid spores rather than gametes. These spores grow into multicellular individuals called gametophytes, without a fertilization event. These haploid individuals produce gametes through mitosis. Meiosis and gamete formation therefore occur in separate multicellular generations or "phases" of the life cycle, referred to as alternation of generations. Since sexual reproduction is often more narrowly defined as the fusion of gametes (fertilization), spore formation in plant sporophytes and algae might be considered a form of asexual reproduction (agamogenesis) despite being the result of meiosis and undergoing a reduction in ploidy. However, both events (spore formation and fertilization) are necessary to complete sexual reproduction in the plant life cycle.

Fungi and some algae can also utilize true asexual spore formation, which involves mitosis giving rise to reproductive cells called mitospores that develop into a new organism after dispersal. This method of reproduction is found for example in conidial fungi and the red algae Polysiphonia, and involves sporogenesis without meiosis. Thus the chromosome number of the spore cell is the same as that of the parent producing the spores. However, mitotic sporogenesis is an exception and most spores, such as those of plants and many algae, are produced by meiosis.

=== Fragmentation ===
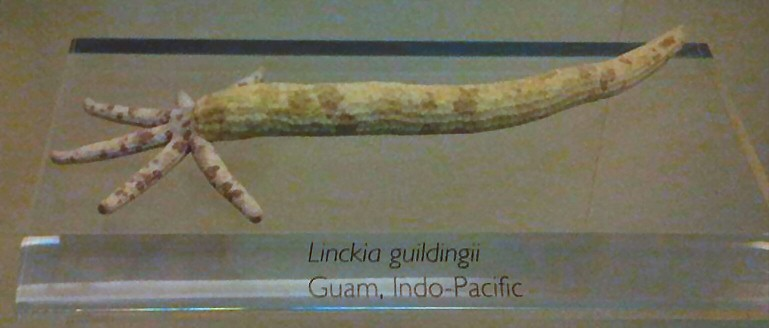
Linckia guildingi "comet", a starfish regrowing from a single arm

Fragmentation is a form of asexual reproduction where a new organism grows from a fragment of the parent. Each fragment develops into a mature, fully grown individual. Fragmentation is seen in many organisms. Animals that reproduce asexually include planarians, many annelid worms including polychaetes and some oligochaetes, turbellarians and sea stars. Many fungi and plants reproduce asexually. Some plants have specialized structures for reproduction via fragmentation, such as gemmae in mosses and liverworts. Most lichens, which are a symbiotic union of a fungus and photosynthetic algae or cyanobacteria, reproduce through fragmentation to ensure that new individuals contain both symbionts. These fragments can take the form of soredia, dust-like particles consisting of fungal hyphae wrapped around photobiont cells.

Clonal Fragmentation in multicellular or colonial organisms is a form of asexual reproduction or cloning where an organism is split into fragments. Each of these fragments develop into mature, fully grown individuals that are clones of the original organism. In echinoderms, this method of reproduction is usually known as fissiparity. Due to many environmental and epigenetic differences, clones originating from the same ancestor might actually be genetically and epigenetically different.

=== Agamogenesis ===
Agamogenesis is any form of reproduction that does not involve any union of gametes. Examples are parthenogenesis and apomixis.

==== Parthenogenesis ====
Parthenogenesis is a form of agamogenesis in which an unfertilized egg develops into a new individual. It has been documented in over 2,000 species. Parthenogenesis occurs in the wild in many invertebrates (e.g. water fleas, rotifers, aphids, stick insects, some ants, bees and parasitic wasps) and vertebrates (mostly reptiles, amphibians, and fish). It has also been documented in domestic birds and in genetically altered lab mice. Plants can engage in parthenogenesis as well through a process called apomixis. However this process is considered by many to not be an independent reproduction method, but instead a breakdown of the mechanisms behind sexual reproduction. Parthenogenetic organisms can be split into two main categories: facultative and obligate.

===== Facultative parthenogenesis =====
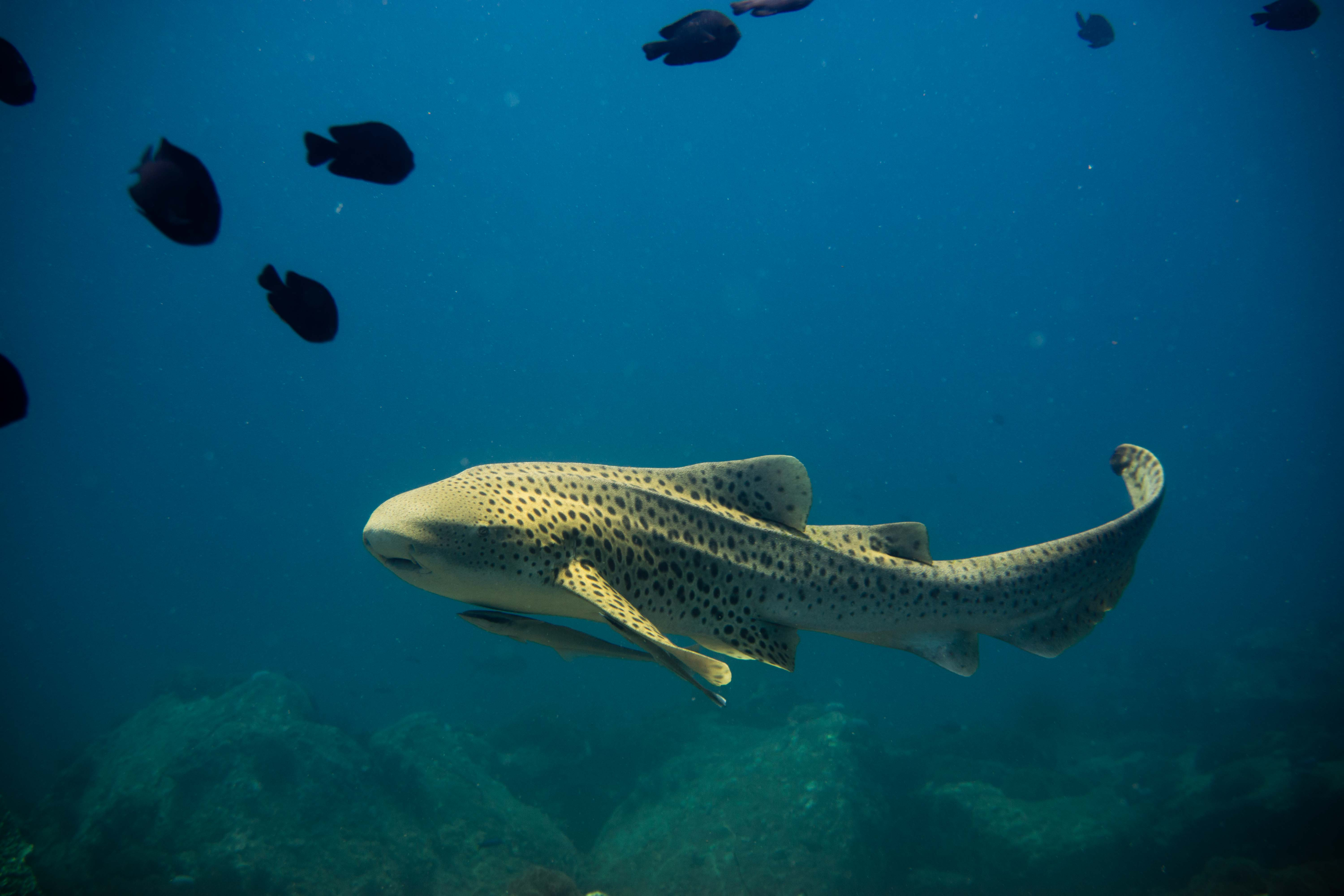
Zebra shark

In facultative parthenogenesis, females can reproduce both sexually and asexually. Because of the many advantages of sexual reproduction, most facultative parthenotes only reproduce asexually when forced to. This typically occurs in instances when finding a mate becomes difficult. For example, female zebra sharks will reproduce asexually if they are unable to find a mate in their ocean habitats.

Parthenogenesis was previously believed to rarely occur in vertebrates, and only be possible in very small animals. However, it has been discovered in many more species in recent years. Today, the largest species that has been documented reproducing parthenogenically is the Komodo dragon at 10 feet long and over 300 pounds.

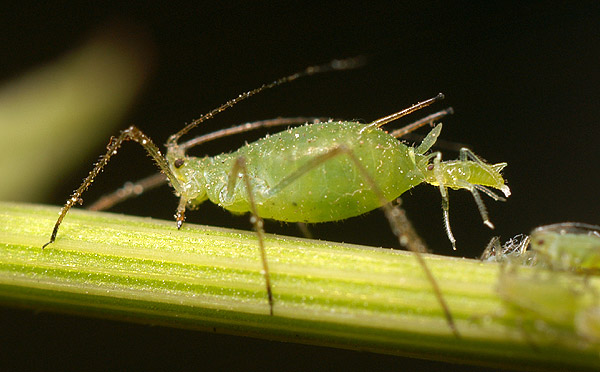
Aphid giving birth to live young from an unfertilized egg

Heterogony is a form of facultative parthenogenesis where females alternate between sexual and asexual reproduction at regular intervals (see Alternation between sexual and asexual reproduction). Aphids are one group of organism that engages in this type of reproduction. They use asexual reproduction to reproduce quickly and create winged offspring that can colonize new plants and reproduce sexually in the fall to lay eggs for the next season. However, some aphid species are obligate parthenotes.

===== Obligate parthenogenesis =====
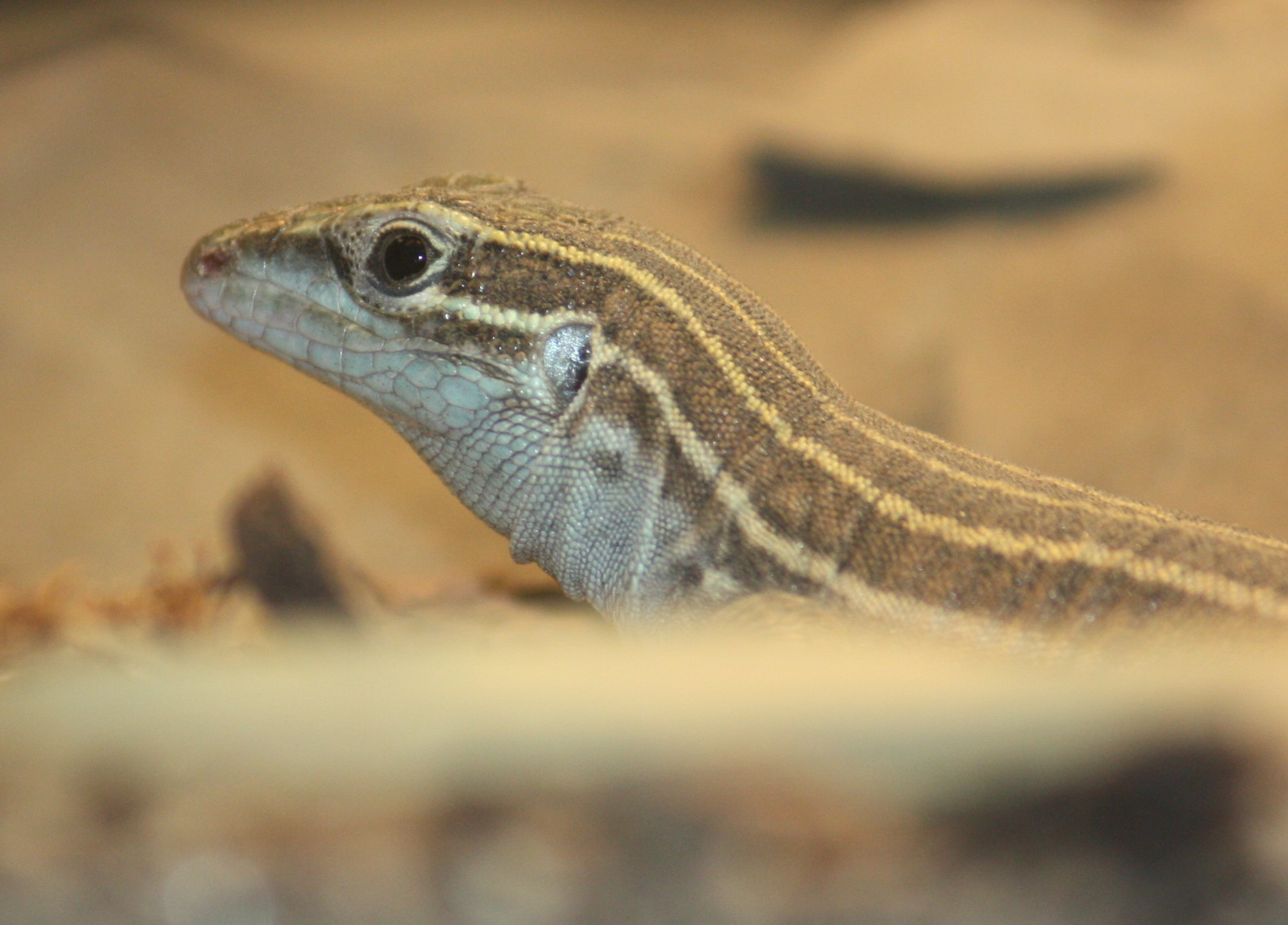
Desert grassland whiptail lizard females reproduce by obligate parthenogenesis.

In obligate parthenogenesis, females only reproduce asexually. One example of this is the desert grassland whiptail lizard, a hybrid of two other species. Typically hybrids are infertile but through parthenogenesis this species has been able to develop stable populations.

Gynogenesis is a form of obligate parthenogenesis where a sperm cell is used to initiate reproduction. However, the sperm's genes never get incorporated into the egg cell. The best known example of this is the Amazon molly. Because they are obligate parthenotes, there are no males in their species so they depend on males from a closely related species (the Sailfin molly) for sperm.

==== Apomixis and nucellar embryony ====
Apomixis in plants is the formation of a new sporophyte without fertilization. It is important in ferns and in flowering plants, but is very rare in other seed plants. In flowering plants, the term "apomixis" is now most often used for agamospermy, the formation of seeds without fertilization, but was once used to include vegetative reproduction. An example of an apomictic plant would be the triploid European dandelion. Apomixis mainly occurs in two forms: In gametophytic apomixis, the embryo arises from an unfertilized egg within a diploid embryo sac that was formed without completing meiosis. In nucellar embryony, the embryo is formed from the diploid nucellus tissue surrounding the embryo sac. Nucellar embryony occurs in some citrus seeds. Male apomixis can occur in rare cases, such as in the Saharan Cypress Cupressus dupreziana, where the genetic material of the embryo is derived entirely from pollen.

=== Androgenesis ===
Androgenesis occurs when a zygote is produced with only paternal nuclear genes. During standard sexual reproduction, one female and one male parent each produce haploid gametes (such as a sperm or egg cell, each containing only a single set of chromosomes), which recombine to create offspring with genetic material from both parents. However, in androgenesis, there is no recombination of maternal and paternal chromosomes, and only the paternal chromosomes are passed down to the offspring (the inverse of this is gynogenesis, where only the maternal chromosomes are inherited, which is more common than androgenesis). The offspring produced in androgenesis will still have maternally inherited mitochondria, as is the case with most sexually reproducing species. Androgenesis occurs in nature in many invertebrates (for example, clams, stick insects, some ants, bees, flies and parasitic wasps) and vertebrates (mainly amphibians and fish). The androgenesis has also been seen in genetically modified laboratory mice.

One of two things can occur to produce offspring with exclusively paternal genetic material: the maternal nuclear genome can be eliminated from the zygote, or the female can produce an egg with no nucleus, resulting in an embryo developing with only the genome of the male gamete.

=== Male apomixis ===
Other type of androgenesis is the male apomixis or paternal apomixis is a reproductive process in which a plant develops from a sperm cell (male gamete) without the participation of a female cell (ovum). In this process, the zygote is formed solely with genetic material from the father, resulting in offspring genetically identical to the male organism. This has been noted in many plants like Nicotiana, Capsicum frutescens, Cicer arietinum, Poa arachnifera, Solanum verrucosum, Phaeophyceae, Pripsacum dactyloides, Zea mays, and occurs as the regular reproductive method in Cupressus dupreziana. This contrasts with the more common apomixis, where development occurs without fertilization, but with genetic material only from the mother.

There are also clonal species that reproduce through vegetative reproduction like Lomatia tasmanica and Pando, where the genetic material is exclusively male.

Other species where androgenesis has been observed naturally are the stick insects Bacillus rossius and Bassillus Grandii, the little fire ant Wasmannia auropunctata, Vollenhovia emeryi, Paratrechina longicornis, occasionally in Apis mellifera, the Hypseleotris carp gudgeons, the parasitoid Venturia canescens, and occasionally in fruit flies Drosophila melanogaster carrying a specific mutant allele. It has also been induced in many crops and fish via irradiation of an egg cell to destroy the maternal nuclear genome.

==== Obligate androgenesis ====
Obligate androgenesis is the process in which males are capable of producing both eggs and sperm, however, the eggs have no genetic contribution and the offspring come only from the sperm, which allows these individuals to self-fertilize and produce clonal offspring without the need for females. They are also capable of interbreeding with sexual and other androgenetic lineages in a phenomenon known as "egg parasitism." This method of reproduction has been found in several species of the clam genus Corbicula, many plants like, Cupressus dupreziana, Lomatia tasmanica, Pando and recently in the fish Squalius alburnoides.

Other species where androgenesis has been observed naturally are the stick insects Bacillus rossius and Bassillus Grandii, the little fire ant Wasmannia auropunctata, Vollenhovia emeryi, Paratrechina longicornis, occasionally in Apis mellifera, the Hypseleotris carp gudgeons, the parasitoid Venturia canescens, and occasionally in fruit flies Drosophila melanogaster carrying a specific mutant allele. It has also been induced in many crops and fish via irradiation of an egg cell to destroy the maternal nuclear genome.

== Alternation between sexual and asexual reproduction ==
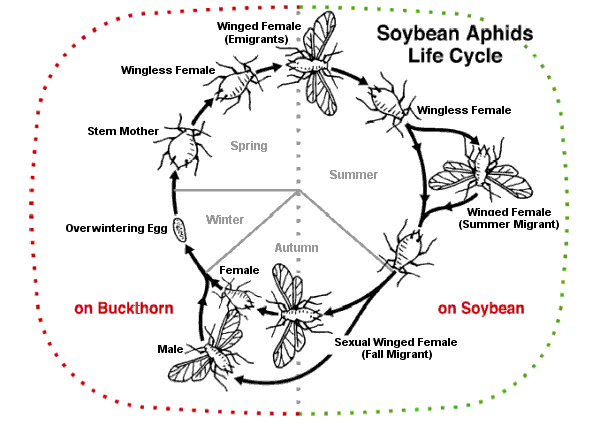
Aphid populations are often entirely female during the summer, with sexual reproduction only to produce eggs for overwintering.

Some species can alternate between sexual and asexual strategies, an ability known as heterogamy, depending on many conditions. Alternation is observed in several rotifer species (cyclical parthenogenesis e.g. in Brachionus species) and a few types of insects.

One example of this is aphids which can engage in heterogony. In this system, females are born pregnant and produce only female offspring. This cycle allows them to reproduce very quickly. However, most species reproduce sexually once a year. This switch is triggered by environmental changes in the fall and causes females to develop eggs instead of embryos. This dynamic reproductive cycle allows them to produce specialized offspring with polyphenism, a type of polymorphism where different phenotypes have evolved to carry out specific tasks.

The cape bee Apis mellifera subsp. capensis can reproduce asexually through a process called thelytoky. The freshwater crustacean Daphnia reproduces by parthenogenesis in the spring to rapidly populate ponds, then switches to sexual reproduction as the intensity of competition and predation increases. Monogonont rotifers of the genus Brachionus reproduce via cyclical parthenogenesis: at low population densities females produce asexually and at higher densities a chemical cue accumulates and induces the transition to sexual reproduction. Many protists and fungi alternate between sexual and asexual reproduction. A few species of amphibians, reptiles, and birds have a similar ability.

The slime mold Dictyostelium undergoes binary fission (mitosis) as single-celled amoebae under favorable conditions. However, when conditions turn unfavorable, the cells aggregate and follow one of two different developmental pathways, depending on conditions. In the social pathway, they form a multi-cellular slug which then forms a fruiting body with asexually generated spores. In the sexual pathway, two cells fuse to form a giant cell that develops into a large cyst. When this macrocyst germinates, it releases hundreds of amoebic cells that are the product of meiotic recombination between the original two cells.

The hyphae of the common mold (Rhizopus) are capable of producing both mitotic as well as meiotic spores. Many algae similarly switch between sexual and asexual reproduction. A number of plants use both sexual and asexual means to produce new plants, some species alter their primary modes of reproduction from sexual to asexual under varying environmental conditions.

== Inheritance in asexual species ==
In the rotifer Brachionus calyciflorus asexual reproduction (obligate parthenogenesis) can be inherited by a recessive allele, which leads to loss of sexual reproduction in homozygous offspring.
Inheritance of asexual reproduction by a single recessive locus has also been found in the parasitoid wasp Lysiphlebus fabarum.

== Examples in animals ==
Asexual reproduction is found in nearly half of the animal phyla. Parthenogenesis occurs in the hammerhead shark and the blacktip shark. In both cases, the sharks had reached sexual maturity in captivity in the absence of males, and in both cases the offspring were shown to be genetically identical to the mothers. The New Mexico whiptail is another example.

Some reptiles use the ZW sex-determination system, which produces either males (with ZZ sex chromosomes) or females (with ZW or WW sex chromosomes). Until 2010, it was thought that the ZW chromosome system used by reptiles was incapable of producing viable WW offspring, but a (ZW) female boa constrictor was discovered to have produced viable female offspring with WW chromosomes. The female boa could have chosen any number of male partners (and had successfully in the past) but on this occasion she reproduced asexually, creating 22 female babies with WW sex-chromosomes.

Polyembryony is a widespread form of asexual reproduction in animals, whereby the fertilized egg or a later stage of embryonic development splits to form genetically identical clones. Within animals, this phenomenon has been best studied in the parasitic Hymenoptera. In the nine-banded armadillos, this process is obligatory and usually gives rise to genetically identical quadruplets. In other mammals, monozygotic twinning has no apparent genetic basis, though its occurrence is common. There are at least 10 million identical human twins and triplets in the world today.

Bdelloid rotifers reproduce exclusively asexually, and all individuals in the class Bdelloidea are females. Asexuality evolved in these animals millions of years ago and has persisted since. There is evidence to suggest that asexual reproduction has allowed the animals to evolve new proteins through the Meselson effect that have allowed them to survive better in periods of dehydration. Bdelloid rotifers are extraordinarily resistant to damage from ionizing radiation due to the same DNA-preserving adaptations used to survive dormancy. These adaptations include an extremely efficient mechanism for repairing DNA double-strand breaks. This repair mechanism was studied in two Bdelloidea species, Adineta vaga, and Philodina roseola. and appears to involve mitotic recombination between homologous DNA regions within each species.

Molecular evidence strongly suggests that several species of the stick insect genus Timema have used only asexual (parthenogenetic) reproduction for millions of years, the longest period known for any insect. Similar findings suggest that the mite species Oppiella nova may have reproduced entirely asexually for millions of years.

In the grass thrips genus Aptinothrips there have been several transitions to asexuality, likely due to different causes.

== Adaptive significance of asexual reproduction ==
A complete lack of sexual reproduction is relatively rare among multicellular organisms, particularly animals. It is not entirely understood why the ability to reproduce sexually is so common among them. Current hypotheses suggest that asexual reproduction may have short term benefits when rapid population growth is important or in stable environments, while sexual reproduction offers a net advantage by allowing more rapid proliferation of genetic diversity, allowing adaptation to changing environments. Developmental constraints may underlie why few animals have relinquished sexual reproduction completely in their life-cycles. Almost all asexual modes of reproduction maintain meiosis either in a modified form or as an alternative pathway. Facultatively apomictic plants increase frequencies of sexuality relative to apomixis after abiotic stress. Another constraint on switching from sexual to asexual reproduction would be the concomitant loss of meiosis and the protective recombinational repair of DNA damage afforded as one function of meiosis.

== See also ==
- Alternation of generations
- Self-fertilization
- Bacterial conjugation
- Biological life cycle
- Biological reproduction, also simply reproduction
- Cloning
- Hermaphrodite
- Plant reproduction
- Biological sex
