= Rubus superbus =

Scientific classification
- Kingdom: Plantae
- Clade: Tracheophytes
- Clade: Angiosperms
- Clade: Eudicots
- Clade: Rosids
- Order: Rosales
- Family: Rosaceae
- Genus: Rubus
- Species: R. superbus

Binomial name
- Rubus superbus Focke 1893 not Sudre 1900 nor Foerster 1878

Species of fruit and plant

Rubus superbus is an uncommon Guatemalan species of brambles in the rose family.

Rubus superbus is a perennial with wool and a few prickles but not many. Leaves are compound with three leaflets.
