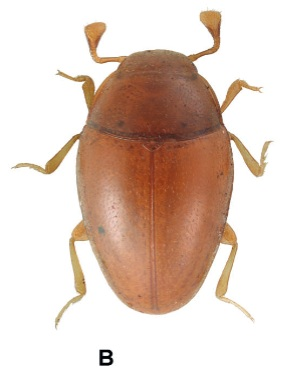

Scientific classification
- Kingdom: Animalia
- Phylum: Arthropoda
- Class: Insecta
- Order: Coleoptera
- Suborder: Polyphaga
- Infraorder: Cucujiformia
- Family: Endomychidae
- Genus: Cholovocera
- Species: C. formiceticola

Binomial name
- Cholovocera formiceticola (Rosenhauer, 1856)

Synonyms
- Choluocera formiceticola Rosenhauer, 1856

= Cholovocera formiceticola =

Species of beetle

Cholovocera formiceticola is a species of beetle of the family Endomychidae. The range of this species extends from southern France in the northeast to the Balearic Islands, and from continental Spain to Algeria and Morocco in the south, reaching the Atlantic coast.

== Description ==
Adults reach a length of about 1.30–1.50 mm and have an elliptical body.

== Biology ==
This species is associated with an unidentified species of Messor (southern France and Andalusia) and possibly with Pheidole pallidula.
