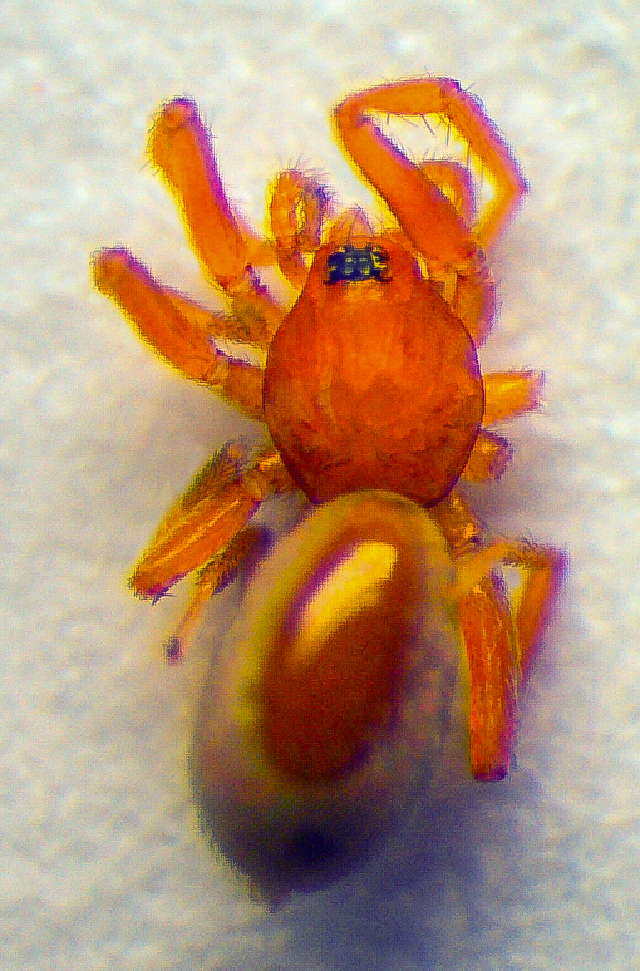
- T. stenaspis

Scientific classification
- Kingdom: Animalia
- Phylum: Arthropoda
- Subphylum: Chelicerata
- Class: Arachnida
- Order: Araneae
- Infraorder: Araneomorphae
- Family: Oonopidae
- Genus: Triaeris; Simon, 1890

= Triaeris =

Genus of spiders

Triaeris is a genus of goblin spiders erected by Eugène Simon in 1890 for the species Triaeris stenaspis. It was described from females from the Lesser Antilles; specimens were found later in heated greenhouses around Europe. No males of T. stenaspis have ever been found and the species may be parthenogenetic. Its taxonomy is confused, and the number of species that should be placed in the genus is unclear. In 2012, Norman I. Platnick and co-authors described the genus Triaeris as "an enigma wrapped around a mystery". They consider that most species assigned to the genus after Simon in 1890 and before 2012 do not belong to Triaeris.

== Species ==
As of April 2016, the World Spider Catalog accepted the following species. The assignment to groups is based on Platnick et al. (2012).

- True species of Triaeris

- Triaeris fako Platnick et al., 2012 – Cameroon
- Triaeris ibadan Platnick et al., 2012 – Nigeria
- Triaeris menchum Platnick et al., 2012 – Cameroon
- Triaeris moca Platnick et al., 2012 – Bioko
- Triaeris oku Platnick et al., 2012 – Cameroon
- Triaeris stenaspis Simon, 1891 (type species) – Pantropical, Iran; introduced into Europe
- Triaeris togo Platnick et al., 2012 – Togo

- African species that should be placed in other related genera

- Triaeris equestris Simon, 1907 – Príncipe
- Triaeris macrophthalmus Berland, 1914 – Kenya

- Indian species considered misidentified ("wildly misplaced")

- Triaeris barela Gajbe, 2004 – India
- Triaeris khashiensis Tikader, 1966 – India
- Triaeris manii Tikader & Malhotra, 1974 – India
- Triaeris melghaticus Bastawade, 2005 – India
- Triaeris nagarensis Tikader & Malhotra, 1974 – India
- Triaeris nagpurensis Tikader & Malhotra, 1974 – India
- Triaeris poonaensis Tikader & Malhotra, 1974 – India
