= Messor cephalotes =

Scientific classification
- Kingdom: Animalia
- Phylum: Arthropoda
- Class: Insecta
- Order: Hymenoptera
- Family: Formicidae
- Subfamily: Myrmicinae
- Genus: Messor
- Species: M. cephalotes

Binomial name
- Messor cephalotes (Emery, 1895)

Species of ant

Messor cephalotes is the largest known species of harvester ant in the world. Native to East Africa, it is found in Ethiopia, Kenya, and Tanzania. The species is known for its impressive size and complex social structure.

== Description ==
The queen of Messor cephalotes measures between 22 and 25 mm (0.9 and 1.0 in) in length, while workers range from 5 to 19 mm (0.2 to 0.7 in). The species exhibits polymorphism, with three worker castes: minor, media, and major. The queen's head is red, thorax black, and abdomen red-patterned. Workers are mostly red with black abdomens.

Messor cephalotes constructs nests by digging tunnels and chambers in soil, preferring warm, sunny, open areas. As a seed harvester, it stores seeds in underground chambers and supplements its diet with small insects such as fruit flies, crickets, and mealworms. It requires minimal sugar intake.

This monogynous species (one queen per colony) is fully claustral, with the queen not needing food during the founding phase. Colonies can grow to several thousand workers. The species is vibration-sensitive and thrives best in quiet environments.

== Distribution ==
Messor cephalotes is distributed across East Africa, particularly in Ethiopia, Kenya, and Tanzania. It inhabits arid and semi-arid environments and is well adapted to the tropical climate of the region.

== Behavior and ecology ==
This species is primarily granivorous, collecting seeds and storing them in underground chambers. It also scavenges insects and helps disperse seeds, contributing to ecosystem balance. It is not particularly aggressive but is highly territorial.

== Captive care ==
Messor cephalotes is popular with collectors due to its behavior. They can build complex colonies in a formicarium. Additionally, they are also effective pest controllers, for example in greenhouses.

In captivity, Messor cephalotes prefers temperatures of 25–28 °C (77–82 °F) and nest humidity between 60 and 70%. Ambient humidity can be lower (30–50%). The species does not require hibernation and remains active year-round. Colonies do best in sand-based or naturalistic setups with low vibration.

== Illegal trade ==
Import or export of these animals is highly regulated and illegal in some places. An illegally smuggled queen ant can fetch 200 Euro on the black market.

While collection and export from Kenya is legal, smuggling these ants from the country carries a minimum prison sentence of ten years or a fine of at least 20 million Kenyan shillings. In 2025 and 2026, smugglers were caught with hundreds of ants and were prosecuted, receiving worldwide news coverage.
