= Pseudogamy =

Aspect of reproduction in zoology and botany

Pseudogamy refers to aspects of reproduction. It has different (but related) meanings in zoology and in botany.

== In zoology ==
In zoology, it means a type of parthenogenesis in which the sperm stimulates the egg cell to develop into an embryo, but no genes from the male are inherited. Gynogenesis is a synonym.

== In botany ==
In botany, "pseudogamy" is also related to asexual reproduction. Wilhelm Olbers Focke (1881) is usually cited for the definition of the term. What he actually said was (page 525, translated)

"III PSEUDOGAMY.
In experiments to raise hybrids, you sometimes get plants that resemble the mother plant, but partly in their sexual potency appear noticeably weakened. They have for this reason often been taken for hybrids. I suspect that in such cases the foreign pollen no real fertilization completed, but only gave the stimulus to produce the outer parts of fruit. The seeds, which are found in the fruit, are, in my opinion, not spawned by hybridization and generally not through sexual procreation, rather they are incurred parthenogenetically."

Thus in botany, pseudogamy means any reproductive process that requires pollination but does not involve male inheritance. It is sometimes used in a restrictive sense to refer to types of agamospermy in which the endosperm is fertilized but the embryo is not (see Pseudogamous apomixis, below). A better term for the restrictive sense is centrogamy.

=== Pseudogamous apomixis ===
Apomixis in flowering plants (angiosperms) includes some types of vegetative reproduction and also agamospermy, which is asexual reproduction through seeds (see apomixis for more information). Agamospermy can occur through many different mechanisms, some of which require pollination (pseudogamy), and some of which do not (autonomous apomixis). Many flowering plants with pseudogamous apomixis require fertilization to produce the endosperm of the seed. However, it has been shown that pollination with compatible pollen can be required even in some species where endosperm development is autonomous.

Pseudogamous apomixis occurs in many families. It is particularly common in Rosaceae and Poaceae, where it occurs in many different genera and species. Examples of species with pseudogamous apomixis include the Himalayan blackberry Rubus armeniacus and gamagrass Tripsacum dactyloides. By contrast, autonomous apomixis is the rule among the many apomictic species of Asteraceae including the common dandelion Taraxacum officinale, and also occurs in several genera of Poaceae.
