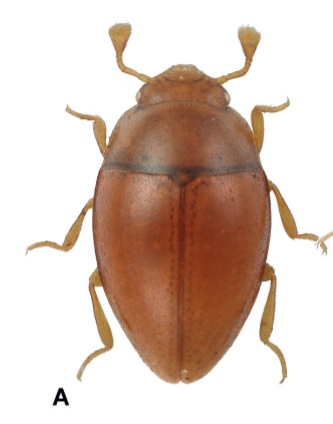

Scientific classification
- Kingdom: Animalia
- Phylum: Arthropoda
- Class: Insecta
- Order: Coleoptera
- Suborder: Polyphaga
- Infraorder: Cucujiformia
- Family: Endomychidae
- Genus: Cholovocera
- Species: C. afghana

Binomial name
- Cholovocera afghana Johnson, 1977

= Cholovocera afghana =

Species of beetle

Cholovocera afghana is a species of beetle of the family Endomychidae. This species is only known from eastern Afghanistan.

== Description ==
Adults reach a length of about 1.57 mm and have an elliptical body.

== Biology ==
This species is associated with Pheidole indica.
