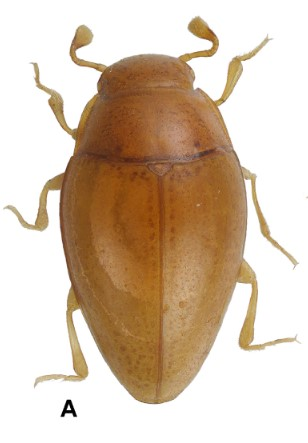
- Cholovocera formicaria

Scientific classification
- Kingdom: Animalia
- Phylum: Arthropoda
- Class: Insecta
- Order: Coleoptera
- Suborder: Polyphaga
- Infraorder: Cucujiformia
- Family: Endomychidae
- Subfamily: Merophysiinae
- Genus: Cholovocera; Victor, 1838

Synonyms
- Choluocera Kraatz, 1858

= Cholovocera =

Genus of beetles

Cholovocera is a genus of handsome fungus beetles in the family Endomychidae. There are 8 described species in Cholovocera.

== Species ==
- Cholovocera formicaria Victor, 1838
- Cholovocera punctata Märkel, 1845
- Cholovocera formiceticola (Rosenhauer, 1856)
- Cholovocera attae (Kraatz, 1858)
- Cholovocera gallica (Schaufuss, 1876)
- Cholovocera balcanica (Karaman, 1936)
- Cholovocera afghana Johnson, 1977
- Cholovocera occulta Delgado & Palma, 2023
