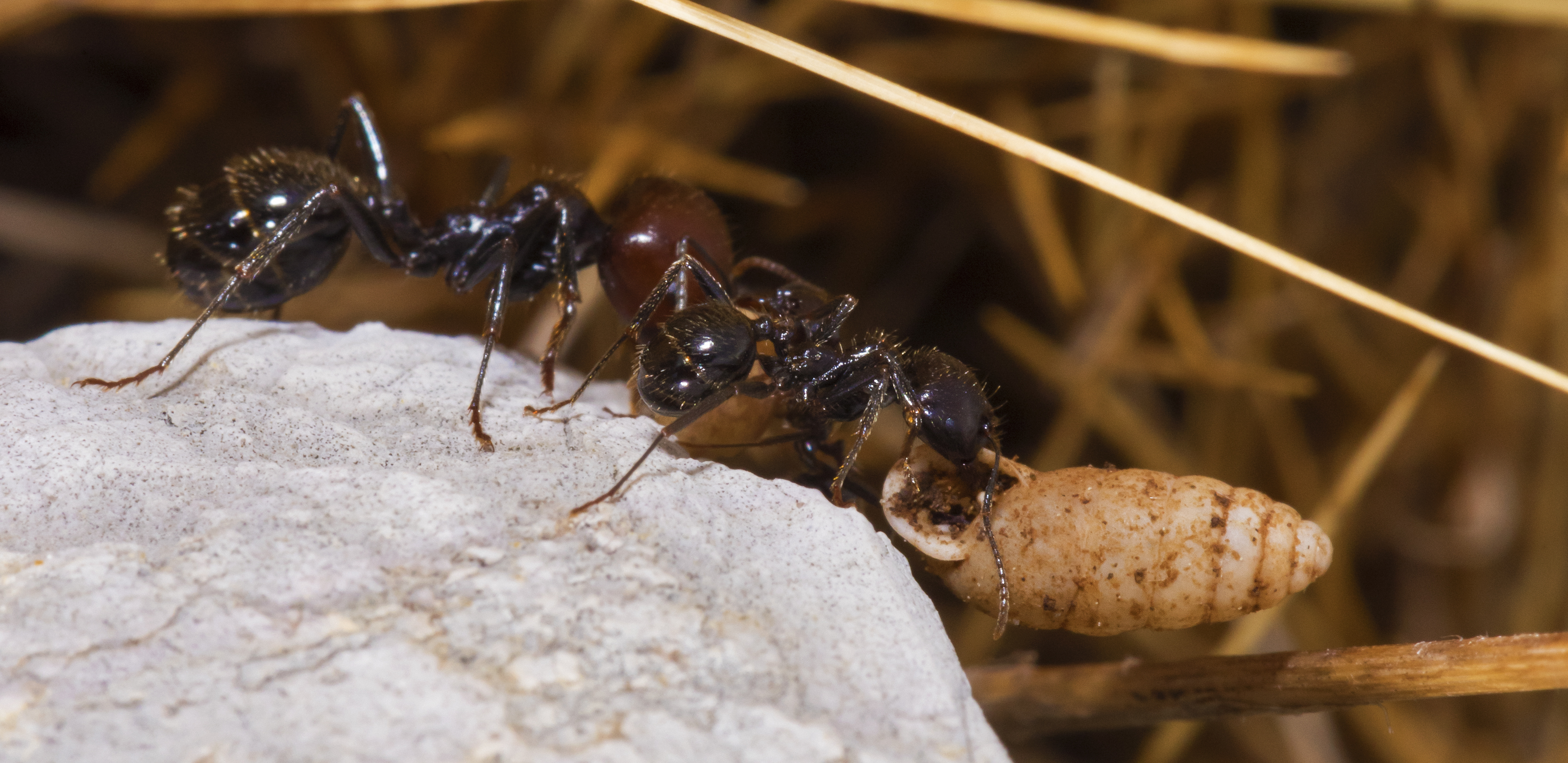

Scientific classification
- Kingdom: Animalia
- Phylum: Arthropoda
- Clade: Pancrustacea
- Class: Insecta
- Order: Hymenoptera
- Family: Formicidae
- Subfamily: Myrmicinae
- Genus: Messor
- Species: M. capitatus

Binomial name
- Messor capitatus (Latreille, 1798)

= Messor capitatus =

Species of ant

Messor capitatus is an ant species part of the genus Messor. This genus includes about 40 specialized species that are found in dry areas of Mediterranean countries such as Africa, Southern Europe, and Asia. Messor capitatus are known as an Old World species because they release trail pheromones from the Dufour gland instead of from poison glands. Messor capitatus are known as individual foragers that collect food independently of one another but sometimes will also use group foraging to form irregular, broad columns. Messor capitatus main food source is seeds but they also will eat remains of plants and animals.

== Chemical communication ==
Messor capitatus are seed-harvesting ants that when they find a food source will go back to the nest to recruit other foragers if the food is too large for them to carry. The ants will lay a trail of chemicals from the food to the nest using their gasters. Once they are inside the nest they will perform a motor display that includes running, body vibrations, contact with nestmates, and food transmission. The nestmates will then get excited and follow the trail laid by the scout to the food source and if they want to recruit more to the patch then they will reinforce the trail by also leaving a trail of chemicals with their gasters. The chemical that the scouts use to lay orientation trails is released from the Dufour's gland. The major compounds that are released from the Dufour gland are Tridecane (28%) and Nonadecane (26%). M.capitatus and M. galla are the first species to have more than a trace quantity of nonadecane released from the Dufour gland. The chemicals released from these glands can last up to 30 minutes after reinforcement has ended. M. capitatus will follow a trail that is made of the secretion from the Dufour's gland the most often and will follow this secretion to the end of the trail. Researchers found that even if the secretion was from a different colony ant they would still follow the trail with no hesitation. The ants would also follow the trail left by the poison gland, but would display aggressive behavior while they followed this trail and did not always follow the trail to the end. The ants did not respond to a trail laid with secretions from the ant's abdomen. M. capitatus also secrete faeces containing the same hydrocarbons as the cuticle of worker ants in what is known as anal spots around their nest to identify it. These anal spot secretions helps the ants identify nestmates or aliens. The anal spots contain hydrocarbons similar to the cuticle because these hydrocarbons are detected during close contact to determine if another ant is a colony-member and to help tell other colonies which nest is their own. These spots were found to contain 60 different compounds that were mostly long-chained branched and linear hydrocarbons. The proportion of compound in the anal spots varied between the colonies as another way to distinguish between them. In M.capitatus these anal spots are created using a rectal sac and not secretions from the Dufour gland.

== Foraging activity ==
Messor capitatus, M. structor, M. aciculatus, and M. chamberlini are all Messor species that can change between individual foraging and group foraging when a large supply of food is discovered. This helps the species to forage independently when resources are dispersed over a large area. If a large amount of resources is found in a concentrated area then these species can change their behavior to recruit other nestmates to help bring back the resources to the nest. The foraging activity of M. capitatus has been studied with respect to how they affect seed dispersal, optimizing their harvest, and patterns of foraging. M.capitatus create long narrow trails that are no more than 10 cm wide and they will drop seeds along these trails. M. capitatus drops 10-15% of the seeds they transport and will redistribute these seeds in bare soil and low sparse vegetation habitats. They rarely disperse the seeds in low, dense and highly vegetated habitats. The effects of seed dispersal by ants is important as it can affect how vegetation will grow and being placed in sparse vegetation means that the seeds have less competition to grow against. M. capitatus is said to optimize their harvest by looking at seed size and determining if the energetic cost of bringing seed back to the nest individually was worth the net benefit to the colony. M. capitatus is a polymorphic species, which means that they have a larger range of size in the species. To optimize their harvest they have the larger ants carry the heavier food back to the nest and have smaller ants carry the lighter food. The ants also had a preference for seeds of a moderate mass of about 400 mg when the seed was about 5-5.5mm in diameter. M. capitatus have been found to commit cleptobiosis, steal, seeds from other colonies of ants. M.capitatus will use a variety of interference tactics to affect foraging by congeners, those within the same genus. M.capitatus caused significant seed predation to the rare and endangered plant Erodium paularense. This plant produces few viable seeds in fruit and M.capitatus only harvests the fruit of trees that have fully developed seeds. Predation rates by M.capitatus of E. paularense seeds is about 43.3%. Seed collection by ants is due to preference and the availability of the seeds and other food sources.

== Thelytokous worker reproduction ==
In a hymenopteran taxa there is usually a fertile queen and sterile workers. Messor capitatus is one of the few species that in rare situations will be able to have thelytokous workers which means through parthenogenesis females are produced by unfertilized eggs. M. capitatus colonies that lose a queen can have workers start to have ovaries that allows them to produce females in the one month after being orphaned and after a ten-month period will start to produce males. This change in sex is not due to the Wolbachia bacterium that infects most insects and is a reproductive parasite.
