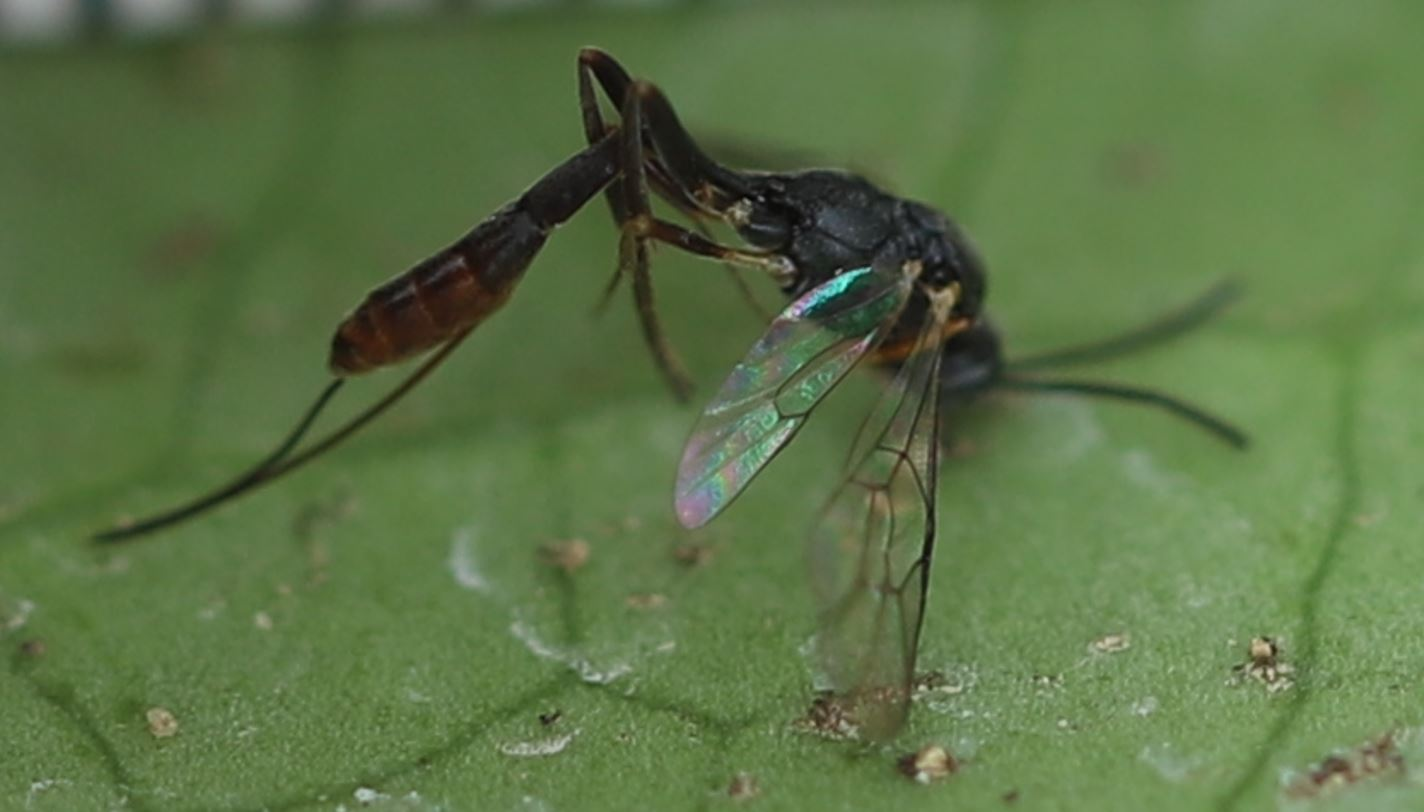

Scientific classification
- Kingdom: Animalia
- Phylum: Arthropoda
- Class: Insecta
- Order: Hymenoptera
- Family: Ichneumonidae
- Genus: Venturia; Schrottky, 1902

= Venturia (wasp) =

Genus of insects

Venturia is a genus of parasitoid wasps belonging to the family Ichneumonidae.

The genus has cosmopolitan distribution.

Among the species in the genus are:

- Venturia ahlensis Maheshwary, 1977
- Venturia altia (Morley, 1913)
- Venturia aurantia
- Venturia biroi
- Venturia canescens (Gravenhorst, 1829)
- Venturia contiguus
- Venturia crassicaput (Morley, 1926)
- Venturia inclyta (Morley, 1923)
- Venturia himachala Gupta & Maheshwary, 1977
- Venturia levocarinata
- Venturia liuae
- Venturia mortifera Vas, 2020
- Venturia peringueyi (Cameron, 1906)
- Venturia serpentina Maheshwary, 1977
- Venturia yunnanensis

== Parthenogenetic reproduction ==
Venturia canescens can produce haploid males from unfertilized eggs (arrhenotoky), a form of parthenogenesis. Females may also produce diploid female offspring by thelytoky, a type of parthenogenesis that involves the production of female progeny in the absence of mating.
