= Triaeris macrophthalmus =

Scientific classification
- Domain: Eukaryota
- Kingdom: Animalia
- Phylum: Arthropoda
- Subphylum: Chelicerata
- Class: Arachnida
- Order: Araneae
- Infraorder: Araneomorphae
- Family: Oonopidae
- Genus: Triaeris (?)
- Species: T. macrophthalmus

Binomial name
- Triaeris macrophthalmus Berland, 1914

Species of spider

Triaeris macrophthalmus is a species of spider from the family Oonopidae. It was described by Lucien Berland in 1914 and is endemic to Tanzania. In 2012, Norman I. Platnick and co-authors described the genus Triaeris as "an enigma wrapped around a mystery". They consider that most species assigned to the genus following Simon in 1890 and before 2012 do not belong to Triaeris, including T. macrophthalmus, which they suggest belongs to one of a group of related genera. As of April 2016, no alternative generic assignment has been accepted by the World Spider Catalog.
