= Wilhelm Olbers Focke =

German physician and botanist (1834–1922)

- Born: 5 April 1834; Bremen
- Died: 29 September 1922 (aged 88); Bremen
- Known for: Rediscovering Mendel's work, Plant hybridization
- Scientific career
- Fields: Botany, Genetics

Wilhelm Olbers Focke (5 April 1834, Bremen – 29 September 1922, Bremen) was a medical doctor and botanist who in 1881 published a significant work on plant breeding entitled Die Pflanzen-Mischlinge, Ein Beitrag zur Biologie der Gewächse (The plant hybrids, a contribution to the biology of plants) which briefly mentioned Gregor Mendel's discoveries on hybridization. Although Charles Darwin had a copy of Focke's book he passed it along to a colleague apparently without reading this particular section. The rediscovery of Mendel's work is generally considered to have taken place in the first years of the 20th century, however in Die Pflanzen-Mischlinge, Mendel is mentioned about 18 times - although Focke did not apparently take Mendel's work all that seriously. Along with hybridization, Focke analyzed the non-Mendelian phenomena of graft hybrids, pseudogamy, and xenia.

In 1889 Focke conducted an inquiry into the former occurrence of malaria in Northern Germany. He also did much of the work throughout his life on the taxonomy of Rubus (Rosaceae) and published several studies (1877-1914). Between 1869 and 1872 he edited the exsiccata Rubi selecti, distributi a Dr. W. O. Focke. He wrote a number of section monographs for Adolf Engler and Karl Anton Eugen Prantl eds. Die Natürlichen Pflanzenfamilien in the family Rosaceae, notably regarding fruit-bearing plants of that family.

Much of his other output was published in the Bremen periodical: Abhandlungen: Naturwissenschaftlicher Verein zu Bremen, a complete list of the published papers in this periodical is available. On examining the Focke entries on this list of articles, one can appreciate the wide range of subjects that he studied as well as the industry with which he applied himself to his work.
