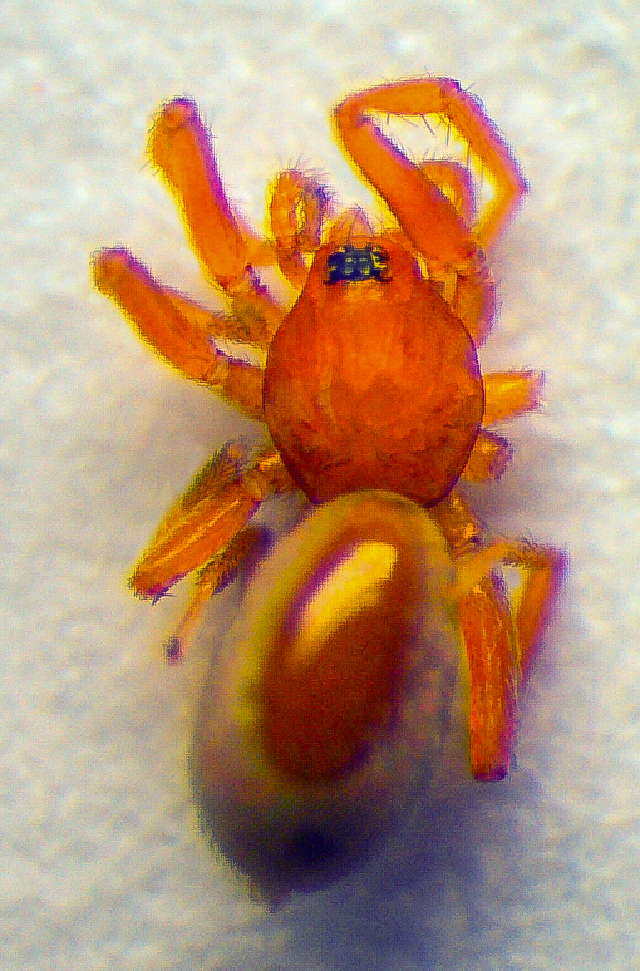

Scientific classification
- Kingdom: Animalia
- Phylum: Arthropoda
- Subphylum: Chelicerata
- Class: Arachnida
- Order: Araneae
- Infraorder: Araneomorphae
- Family: Oonopidae
- Genus: Triaeris
- Species: T. stenaspis

Binomial name
- Triaeris stenaspis Simon, 1891

Synonyms
- Triaeris patellaris Bryant, 1940; Triaeris berlandi Lawrence, 1952; Triaeris lepus Suman, 1965; Triaeris lacandona Brignoli, 1974

= Triaeris stenaspis =

Species of spider

Triaeris stenaspis is a species of spider in the family Oonopidae, with a pantropical distribution. It is also found in Iran and has been introduced into Europe. A very small spider, with a maximum body length of under 2 mm (0.08 in), it has been shown to prey successfully on springtails. Only females have ever been found, and the species may be parthenogenetic, being able to produce female offspring from unfertilized eggs.

== Description ==
The male of the species is unknown. The female is generally pale orange or yellowish brown, with a body about 1.8 mm (0.07 in) long. Like most members of the family Oonopidae, T. stenaspis has only six eyes. Adults, but not immature stages, have hardened, darker plates or scuta on the abdomen. On the upper surface, the dorsal scutum covers most of the abdomen. On the lower surface, the ventral scutum is divided into two halves by the epigastric furrow, so that sources variously describe it as one or two scuta, making two or three scuta in total.

A diagnostic character of the genus Triaeris is the long patella; the patella of the first leg of T. stenaspis is almost as long as the tibia. In adults, the first leg has three pairs of spines on the ventral surface of the patella and five pairs on ventral surface of the tibia. Immatures have fewer spines. The genitalia are complex, occupying most of the ventral scutum.

== Taxonomy ==
The species was first described by Eugène Simon in 1891, based on a specimen collected in the West Indian island of Saint Vincent. It is the type species of the genus. Simon also noted that it had been found in Venezuela. The generic name Triaeris is derived from the Latin word triēris, meaning "three rows of oars" (as in trireme); the specific epithet stenaspis here means "with a narrow carapace".

== Distribution and habitat ==
Triaeris stenapis has a wide distribution in tropical and subtropical areas of the world, including the Americas from the southern United States south to Argentina, central Africa and Madagascar, Taiwan, Queensland in Australia, and isolated islands such as the Galápagos, Hawaii, the Marquesas and the Cook Islands. In Europe, it has been introduced in heated greenhouses, including those in Finland, Britain, France, Belgium, the Czech Republic and Slovakia. In larger European cities that are warmer than the surrounding countryside, it has also been found in more natural habitats.

The species is primarily an inhabitant of leaf litter; most collections of the genus Triaeris have been obtained by sifting leaf litter.

== Prey ==
There have been few studies of the prey taken by Triaeris stenaspis in the wild; springtails and ants have been suggested as possible prey. In a laboratory study conducted on T. stenaspis using spiders and potential prey collected in the botanical garden of the Masaryk University in the Czech Republic, it was found that springtails were strongly preferred. They were captured by a grasp-and-hold strategy. Prey was bitten behind the head and was rapidly immobilized, although about 10% of the prey were able to jump once, during which time the spider held on. The authors of the study suggest that T. stenaspis may be a specialist predator on springtails.

== Parthenogenesis ==
As males have never been found, the species is thought to be parthenogenetic, although this has only been demonstrated in spiders kept under laboratory conditions. Individuals were reared from eggs and kept alive on a diet of springtails until they died. After hatching, they passed through three juvenile stages (instars), each lasting about a month and followed by a moult during which they increased in size. Adults lived on average about six months. All the spiders were female and, although kept in isolation, laid fertile eggs that developed into females, thus demonstrating parthenogenesis (more specifically, thelytoky).
