= Curt Schrottky =

German entomologist (1874–1937)

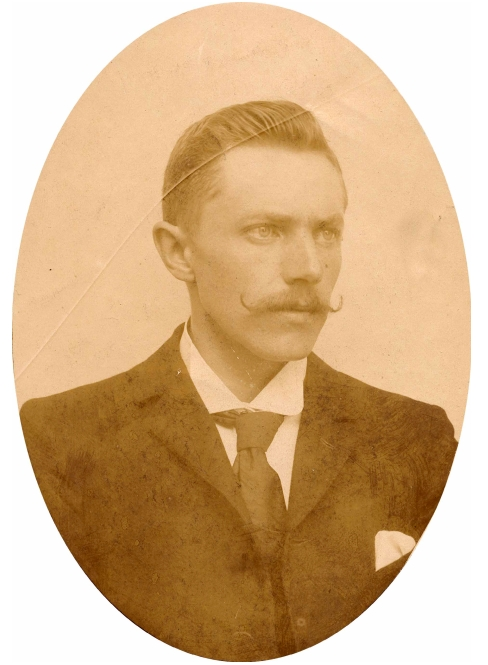
Before 1905

Curt Schrottky (October 21, 1874 – 1937) was a Russia-born German entomologist who worked in South America. He was especially interested in the Hymenoptera and described numerous species.

Schrottky was born in Petroko (now Piotrków Trybunalski, Poland) and was educated in Berlin and Breslau. He then went to work at the Hoffman workshop in Breslau before leaving to Brazil. He began to collect bees around Jundiaí, São Paulo in January 1897 and began to correspond with Heinrich Friese (1860–1948) on their identifications. In 1901, a manuscript on the Brazilian bees with 62 new taxa was prepared and he began to also collaborate with Hermann Friedrich Albrecht von Ihering (1850–1930) who hired him as a janitor at the Museu Paulista, São Paulo, Brazil. He also began to curate the Hymenopteran collections there. In 1901 his father died and he prepared to visit Europe. He planned on taking his girlfriend Francisca Schummacker but since he had not asked her mother for permission, he was arrested on charges of kidnapping. He was relieved from the museum and he did not return to Brazil but moved to Buenos Aires where he worked on another manuscript on Hymenoptera around 1902. A little later he moved to Itapúa, Paraguay where he became an accountant in a German colony at Villa Encarnación. He built a network of collectors who provided him specimens from around South America. This network was further strengthened by his marriage to Misiones "Inés" Bertoni (b. 1884), the daughter of Moisè Giacomo (Moisés Santiago) Bertoni (1857–1929) in 1908. he then moved to Puerto Bertoni and worked for his father in law until 1910. After that he worked as an accountant on the Alto Paraná. In 1912 he worked in Puerto Cantera and in 1913 at Posadas. From 1920 he edited a German language newspaper Wochenblatt für den Alto Parana for settlers in the region. His collections were however damaged during political conflict in Paraguay in 1922–23. He died in 1937 at Montecarlo, Misiones.
