= Aptinothrips =

Scientific classification
- Kingdom: Animalia
- Phylum: Arthropoda
- Class: Insecta
- Order: Thysanoptera
- Family: Thripidae
- Genus: Aptinothrips; Haliday, 1836

Genus of insects

Aptinothrips is a genus of insects belonging to the family Thripidae.

The species of this genus are found in Europe, Australia and Northern America.

Species:

- Aptinothrips elegans Priesner, 1924
- Aptinothrips karnyi John, 1927
