= Solanum verrucosum =

Scientific classification
- Kingdom: Plantae
- Clade: Tracheophytes
- Clade: Angiosperms
- Clade: Eudicots
- Clade: Asterids
- Order: Solanales
- Family: Solanaceae
- Genus: Solanum
- Species: S. verrucosum

Binomial name
- Solanum verrucosum Schltdl.

Synonyms
- Solanum macropilosum Correll; Solanum squamulosum M.Martens & Galeotti

Species of plant in the nightshade family

Solanum verrucosum is a species of wild potato in the family Solanaceae, native to Mexico. It is typically found in cloud forests at 2,100–3,500 m (6,900–11,500 ft) above sea level. Its tubers are small and late to develop, but said to be quite tasty.

A diploid, it is being extensively studied for its resistance to Phytophthora infestans (the cause of late potato blight), and Potato leafroll virus, in an effort to improve the domestic potato Solanum tuberosum.
