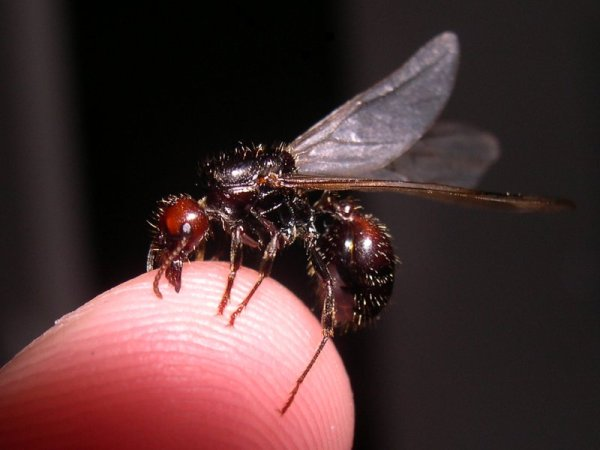
- Messor barbarus alate

Scientific classification
- Kingdom: Animalia
- Phylum: Arthropoda
- Clade: Pancrustacea
- Class: Insecta
- Order: Hymenoptera
- Family: Formicidae
- Subfamily: Myrmicinae
- Genus: Messor
- Species: M. barbarus

Binomial name
- Messor barbarus (Linnaeus, 1767)

= Messor barbarus =

Species of ant

Messor barbarus is a species of harvester ant in the subfamily Myrmicinae. It is found In Southern Europe and Northern Africa.

== Interaction with Humans ==
Messor barbarus causes 50–100% of the seed losses and is the most common ant in arable fields in northeastern Spain (Westerman et al. 2012). These ants in particular made news headlines all over Spain when farmers believed they were stealing their seeds and began a cull, only to realise they actually play a massive part of the ecosystem and benefit the production for crop farmers completely. Messors will carry the seeds on their own roads back to the colony, sometimes up to 100 feet (30 m) away.

== Behavior ==
=== Trail foraging behavior ===
Messor barbarus is found to act in accordance with the optimal foraging theory, which predicts that selectivity in ants increases with increasing richness of resources in an area, as well as with increasing distance from starting location. Trails were likewise differentially favored according to the relative abundance of resources provided to the ant populations. Highly frequented trails had a higher mean rate per worker, meaning the harvesters returned higher rates of resources more efficiently along these trails. These trails drew more foraging ants to retrieve seeds on the whole, and the foraging ants returned seeds at a higher rate per capita. This foraging pattern indicates that relative food abundance along varying trails impacted the patterns of trail foraging behavior in Messor barbarus. For trails spanning long distances, ants exhibit behavior of strong chemical marking on preferred seeds to allow for the creation and maintenance of the route.

=== Methods of recruitment ===
While individual harvesting is important for times of low-level homogeneously distributed resources, mechanisms which allow for rapid colonial recruitment and mobilization in harvesting of resource-dense regions allow for increased energy-gain on the colony level. There are three distinct methods of mass recruitment in harvesting ants.

- Tandem running: using chemical or tactile signals, one ant leads a follower ant to a target location along the trail.
- Group recruitment: groups of five to thirty workers at a time are recruited by leaders which employ a motor display to induce following along a short-lived trail of recruitment pheromones. This tactic is often used in order to retrieve larger items.
- Mass recruitment: recruitment pheromones are secreted by foragers and workers leave the nest to follow established trails in relative proportion to the amount of recruitment pheromones present on a given trail.

M. barbarus uses trunk trails, permanent trails up to 30 meters long that remain even when not in use.

=== Division of labor in trail foraging behavior ===
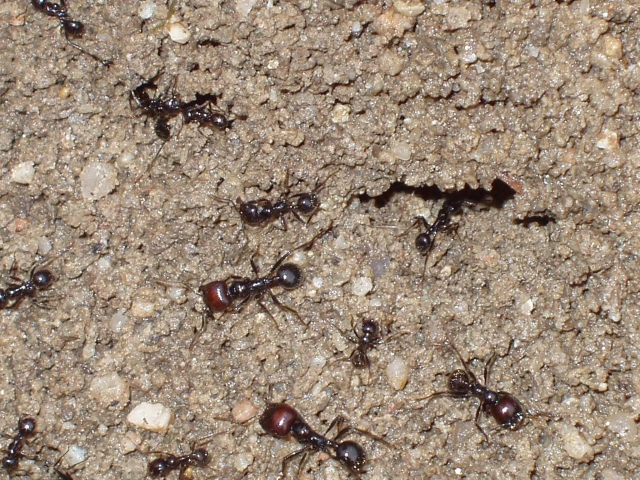
Messor barbarus workers

Small seeds, such as oat fragments or canary seeds, are favored for triggering the onset of recruitment and mobilization of harvesting in Messor barbarus populations. This is because they allow for a faster rate of return between the initial discovery of the food source and the subsequent return of scouts to the nest to relay information to the greater population. The trail is adjusted by a fleet of initial scouts which enhance the harvesting patterns to select for the preferred seed size. Worker ants are divided into three distinct size classes which in turn correspond to the size of the seeds harvested. All of the ants participate in the process of trail-laying, but within the size classes there are distinct roles. The majority of ants in the harvesting arena are Media ants, which are responsible primarily for trail-laying. Minor ants are most efficient in carrying smaller seeds such as oat fragments. Major ants are primarily involved in the harvesting of larger or more preferred seed species. The collective action of M. barbarus favors the minimization of foraging time rather than maximized efficiency of the energetic gain per item harvested. On the whole, group cooperation allows for a successful balance to be struck between the benefits of maximized food exploitation and colony-wide energy gain and the costs associated with increased predation risk.

These different classes of workers cooperate to transport loads of seeds, often forming a transport chain. The first workers tend to be smaller to medium-sized, which corresponds to a high loading ratio. Lower loading ratios correspond to those larger workers which tend to align towards the end of the transport chain, transporting the larger goods for the colony. Overall, this strategy reduces time spent in transport to the nest and results in a net benefit to the colony.

=== Selection of aggregation sites ===
Studies show that the only reliable predictor of ant behavior was the mass of seeds harvested; seeds weighing under 0.4 mg were rarely selected. Scout ants bring back small seeds during their initial harvest as it takes a shorter span of time to bring these seeds back to the population. Subsequent aggregation site selection does not depend on the direct comparison between potential sites by any individual scout, but rather on mechanisms of chemical trails which amplify recruitment to higher-yielding trails. The net result of this is that given a variety of options for aggregation sites, colonies will differentially forage in resource-rich regions. This behavior results from collective decision on behalf of the group executed through independently acting individuals in the population. M. barbarus also ceases foraging at an aggregation site when the food supply is depleted.

=== Interactions with neighboring ant populations and seed robbing ===
On occasions when a colony intersects in path or places seeds in the regions of other colonies, violent fighting often breaks out. Seed-harvesting ants ordinarily will thus direct paths to specifically avoid disrupting the paths of other seed-harvesting colonies, as engaging in conflict is likely to detract from the colony's own ability to maximize harvesting efficiency. In some instances, interference competition plays out through intra-population seed robbery. One study indicated that Messor barbarus populations rob harvested Euphorbia characias seeds from other ant populations, specifically populations of Tapinoma nigerrimum. This behavior is relatively common, and is accomplished by directly removing the harvested seeds from the traveling ant populations, or through more indirect mechanisms of territory-defense, physical threat displays and altercations, chemically induced deterrents, and nest-plugging. The behavior has impacts on the processes of seedling recruitment for E. characias, which depends on myrmecochory, seed dispersal by ants, to transport its seeds to appropriate sites for survival and reproduction.

=== Harvesting as weed control in cereal crops ===
M. barbarus is a seed predator in cereal fields. This is beneficial to crops, as it serves as a form of weed control. There is some evidence which indicates this harvesting can lead to a decline in total yield at harvest. Studies show however that the real effects of this hypothesis are minimal, with only an average of a 0.2% decline in potential yield from seed predation in newly sown seed populations and an average of a 0.6% decline in yield losses at harvest. Thus, the negative impacts on yield are outweighed by the benefits to crops through the weed control function of the harvesters.
