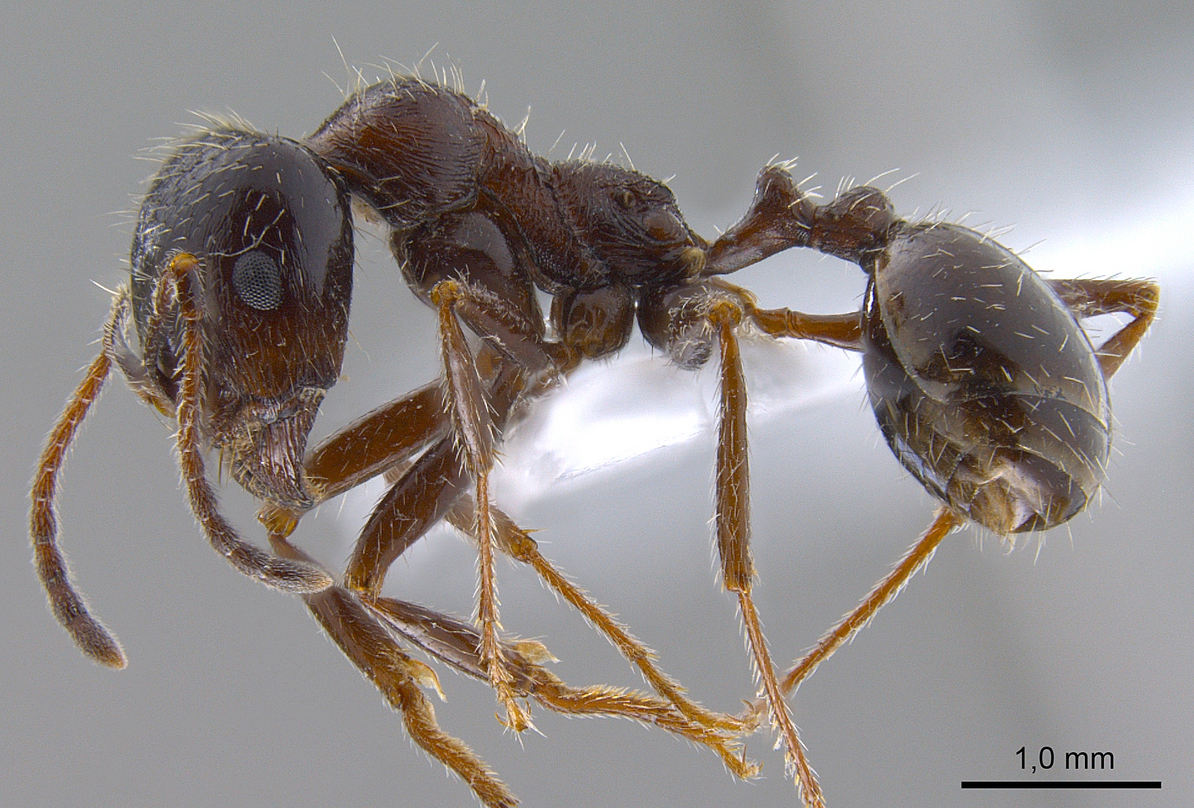
- Pinned M. structor worker ant
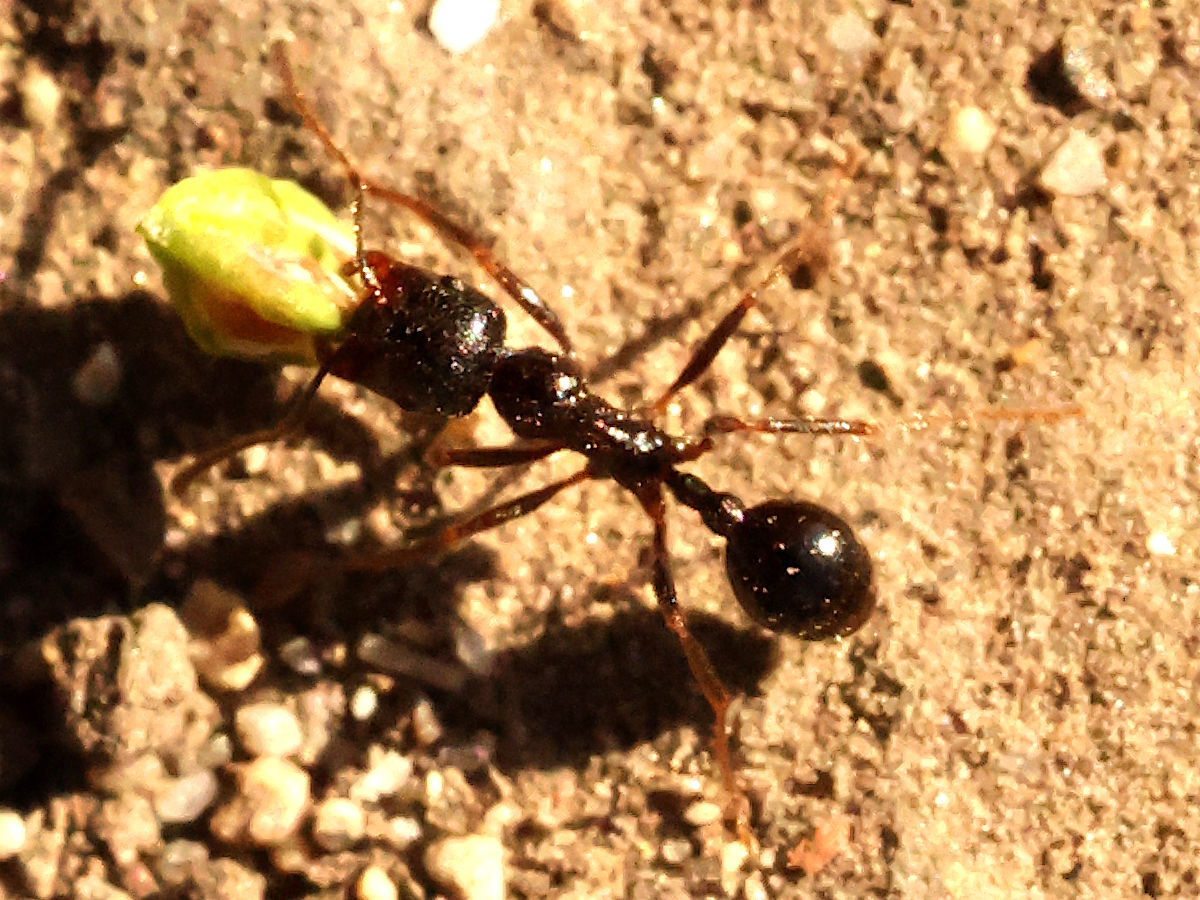
- Worker foraging

Scientific classification
- Kingdom: Animalia
- Phylum: Arthropoda
- Class: Insecta
- Order: Hymenoptera
- Family: Formicidae
- Subfamily: Myrmicinae
- Genus: Messor
- Species: M. structor

Binomial name
- Messor structor (Latreille, 1798)

= Messor structor =

Species of ant

Messor structor is a species of harvester ant belonging to the subfamily Myrmicinae native to the Mediterranean region and adjacent areas. It has been reported from southern Europe (e.g. Iberian Peninsula, France, Italy, Balkans) through North Africa and into western Asia. Its northern range reaches into the southern parts of Central Europe.

== Description ==
Messor structor is a large, seed-harvester ant with pronounced worker polymorphism. Workers range roughly 4–10 mm in length. The body color is typically dark brown to black; unlike some other Messor species, many M. structor workers have a distinctly brown hue. The exoskeleton is covered with relatively dense, stiff hairs or bristles.

== Habitat ==
M. structor typically inhabits dry, open habitats – especially sandy or steppe environments. It favors steppes, semi-deserts and sandy plains.

== Behavior ==
=== Foraging ===
Like other harvester ants, M. structor is mainly granivorous. Workers forage for and collect seeds throughout the warm season. They remove seed appendages before storing the seeds in the nest, which inhibits seed germination. Colonies can accumulate large seed stores, often 1–2 kg or more in underground chambers.

=== Colony structure ===
Messor structor colonies are typically polygynous and can be quite large. Colonies on the order of thousands of workers are common. One source notes colonies up to ~5,000 workers in the wild, while anecdotal reports suggest very large captive colonies of tens of thousands are possible. In many areas M. structor populations form unicolonial super-colonies – nests lack clear boundaries and workers freely intermingle between neighboring nests. For example, Austrian populations have been observed as unicolonial, with no clear aggression between nests and no distinct mating flights.
