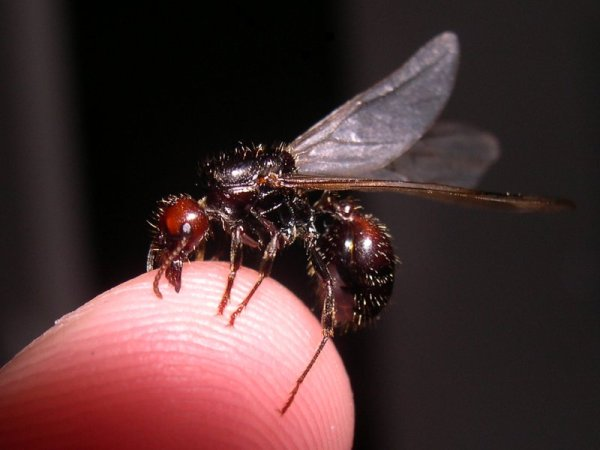
- Messor barbarus queen with wings still attached

Scientific classification
- Kingdom: Animalia
- Phylum: Arthropoda
- Clade: Pancrustacea
- Class: Insecta
- Order: Hymenoptera
- Family: Formicidae
- Subfamily: Myrmicinae
- Tribe: Stenammini
- Genus: Messor; Forel, 1890

Type species
- Formica barbara Linnaeus, 1767

Diversity
- 136 species

Synonyms
- Cratomyrmex Emery, 1892; Lobognathus Enzmann, J., 1947

= Messor =

Genus of ants

Messor is a genus of myrmicine ants with more than 100 species, all of which are harvester ants; the generic name comes from the Roman god of crops and harvest, Messor. The subterranean colonies tend to be found in open fields and near roadsides, openings are directly to the surface.

Colonies can achieve huge sizes and are notable for their intricately designed granaries in which seeds are stored in dry conditions, preventing germination. The structure of Messor spp. nests is complex and the genus on the whole is one of very accomplished architects.

Messor spp. are polymorphic and have a distinct caste of macrocephalic dinoergates whose role is carrying and cutting the large seeds which comprise much of the colonies' subsistence. Although they primarily feed on seeds, they occasionally eat insects and snails. Some snail shells possibly are taken into the nest because of their grain-like shape.

Equipped with a tough, shining cuticle, Messor spp. are slow-moving and form long, seed-carrying runs. Colonies tend to be monogynous - founded by a single queen alone.

Looking specifically at the M. arenarius species for example, like some other types of harvester ants, they emit trail pheromones as well as operating on an individual level when looking for food sources.

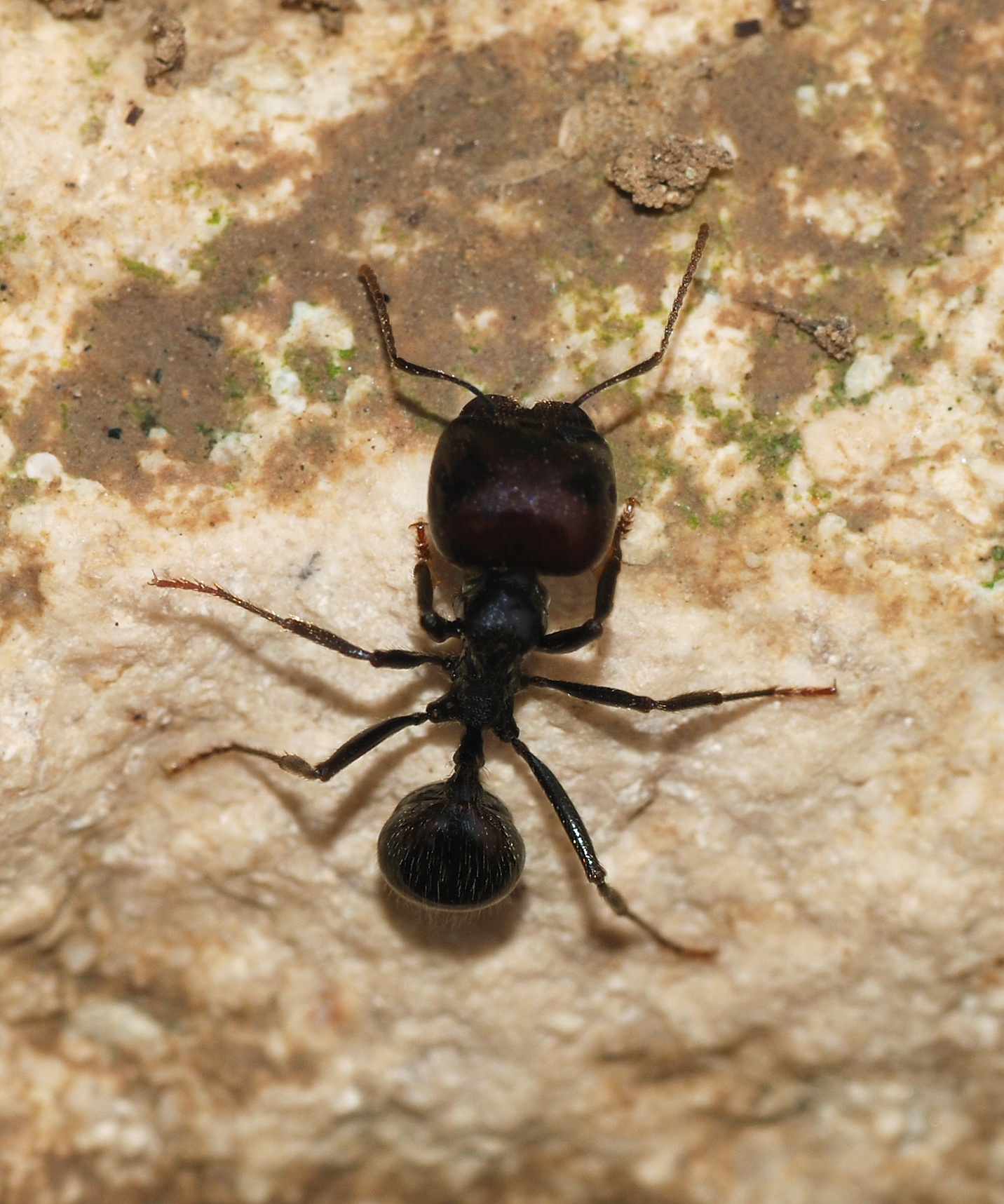
Messor sp. worker

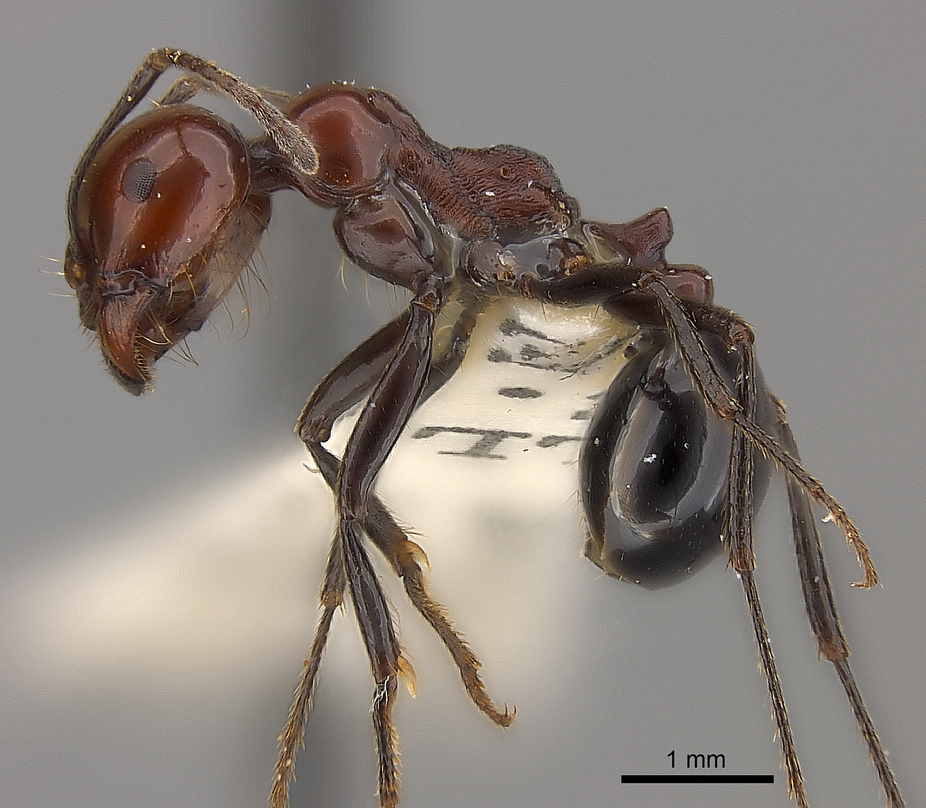
M. angularis antweb.org specimen

== Species ==
- Messor abdelazizi Santschi, 1921
- Messor aciculatus (Smith, 1874)
- Messor aegyptiacus (Emery, 1878)
- Messor alexandri Tohme, 1981
- Messor angularis Santschi, 1928
- Messor antennatus Emery, 1908
- Messor aphenogasteroides Pisarski, 1967
- Messor aralocaspius Ruzsky, 1902
- Messor arenarius (Fabricius, 1787)
- Messor asmaae (Sharaf, 2018)
- Messor atanassovii Atanassov, 1982
- Messor barbarus (Linnaeus, 1767)
- Messor berbericus Bernard, 1955
- Messor bernardi Cagniant, 1967
- Messor bouvieri Bondroit, 1918
- Messor boyeri Cagniant, 2006
- Messor brevispinosus Santschi, 1923
- Messor bucephalus Salata et al., 2023
- Messor buettikeri Collingwood, 1985
- Messor caducus (Victor, 1839)
- Messor capensis (Mayr, 1862)
- Messor capitatus (Latreille, 1798)
- Messor carpathous Menozzi, 1936
- Messor caviceps (Forel, 1902)
- Messor celiae Reyes, 1985
- Messor cephalotes (Emery, 1895)
- Messor ceresis Santschi, 1934
- Messor clivorum (Ruzsky, 1905)
- Messor clypeatus Kuznetsov-Ugamsky, 1927
- Messor collingwoodi Bolton, 1982
- Messor concolor Santschi, 1927
- Messor crawleyi Santschi, 1928
- Messor creticus Salata & Borowiec, 2019
- Messor danaes Salata et al., 2023
- Messor decipiens Santschi, 1917
- Messor dentatus Santschi, 1927
- Messor denticornis Forel, 1910
- Messor denticulatus Santschi, 1927
- Messor desertora He & Song, 2009
- Messor diabarensis Arnol'di, 1969
- †Messor draxil Fisher, 2025
- Messor ebeninus Santschi, 1927
- Messor eglalae Sharaf, 2007
- Messor erectus Espadaler, 1998
- Messor erwini Orou et al., 2023
- Messor excursionis Ruzsky, 1905
- Messor ferreri Collingwood, 1993
- Messor foreli Santschi, 1923
- Messor galla (Mayr, 1904)
- Messor grandinidus Emery, 1912
- Messor hebraeus Santschi, 1927
- Messor hellenius Agosti & Collingwood, 1987
- Messor himalayanus (Forel, 1902)
- Messor hismai Collingwood & Agosti, 1996
- Messor hispanicus Santschi, 1919
- Messor hodnii Barech et al., 2020
- Messor hoggarensis Santschi, 1929
- Messor ibericus Santschi, 1931
- Messor incisus Stitz, 1923
- Messor incorruptus Kuznetsov-Ugamsky, 1929
- Messor inermis Kuznetsov-Ugamsky, 1929
- Messor instabilis (Smith, 1858)
- Messor intermedius Santschi, 1927
- Messor isekram (Bernard, 1977)
- Messor kardamenae Salata & Borowiec, 2023
- Messor kasakorum Arnol'di, 1969
- Messor kisilkumensis Arnol'di, 1969
- Messor laboriosus Santschi, 1927
- Messor lamellicornis Arnol'di, 1968
- Messor lobicornis Forel, 1894
- Messor luebberti Forel, 1910
- Messor luridus Santschi, 1927
- Messor lusitanicus Tinaut, 1985
- Messor maculifrons Santschi, 1927
- Messor marikovskii Arnol'di, 1969
- Messor marocanus Santschi, 1927
- Messor mcarthuri Steiner et al., 2018
- Messor medioruber Santschi, 1910
- Messor mediosanguineus Donisthorpe, 1946
- Messor melancholicus Arnol'di, 1977
- Messor meridionalis (André, 1883)
- Messor minor (Andre, 1883)
- Messor muraywahus Collingwood & Agosti, 1996
- Messor muscatus Collingwood & Agosti, 1996
- Messor muticus (Nylander, 1849)
- Messor nahali Tohme, 1981
- Messor niloticus Santschi, 1938
- Messor nondentatus He & Song, 2009
- Messor nuvia Fisher, 2025
- Messor obscurior Pashaei Rad et al., 2018
- Messor odrysarum Lapeva-Gjonova & Borowiec, 2026
- Messor oertzeni Forel, 1910
- Messor olegianus Arnol'di, 1969
- Messor orientalis (Emery, 1898)
- Messor perantennatus Arnol'di, 1969
- Messor piceus Stitz, 1923
- Messor picturatus Santschi, 1927
- Messor platyceras Crawley, 1920
- Messor ponticus Steiner et al., 2018
- Messor postpetiolatus Santschi, 1917
- Messor postquadratus Santschi, 1932
- Messor punctaticeps Barech et al., 2020
- Messor regalis (Emery, 1892)
- Messor reticuliventris Karavaiev, 1910
- Messor rufotestaceus (Foerster, 1850)
- Messor rufus Santschi, 1923
- Messor ruginodis Stitz, 1916
- Messor rugosus (Andre, 1881)
- Messor sanctus Emery, 1921
- Messor sanganus Collingwood & Agosti, 1996
- Messor santschii Santschi, 1910
- Messor semirufus (Andre, 1883)
- Messor semoni (Forel, 1906)
- Messor sordidus (Forel, 1892)
- Messor striatellus Arnol'di, 1969
- Messor striaticeps (Andre, 1883)
- Messor striatifrons Stitz, 1923
- Messor striativentris Emery, 1908
- Messor striatulus (Dalla Torre, 1893)
- Messor structor (Latreille, 1798)
- Messor subgracilinodis Arnol'di, 1969
- Messor sultanus Santschi, 1917
- Messor syriacus Tohme, 1969
- Messor tadzhikorum Arnol'di, 1970
- Messor tataricus (Ruzsky, 1905)
- Messor testaceus Donisthorpe, 1950
- Messor timidus (Espadaler, 1997)
- Messor tropicorum Wheeler, 1922
- Messor turcmenochorassanicus Arnol'di, 1977
- Messor valentinae Arnol'di, 1969
- Messor variabilis Kuznetsov-Ugamsky, 1927
- Messor varrialei Emery, 1921
- Messor vaucheri Emery, 1908
- Messor veneris Salata et al., 2023
- Messor vicinus Kuznetsov-Ugamsky, 1927
- Messor wasmanni Krausse, 1910
