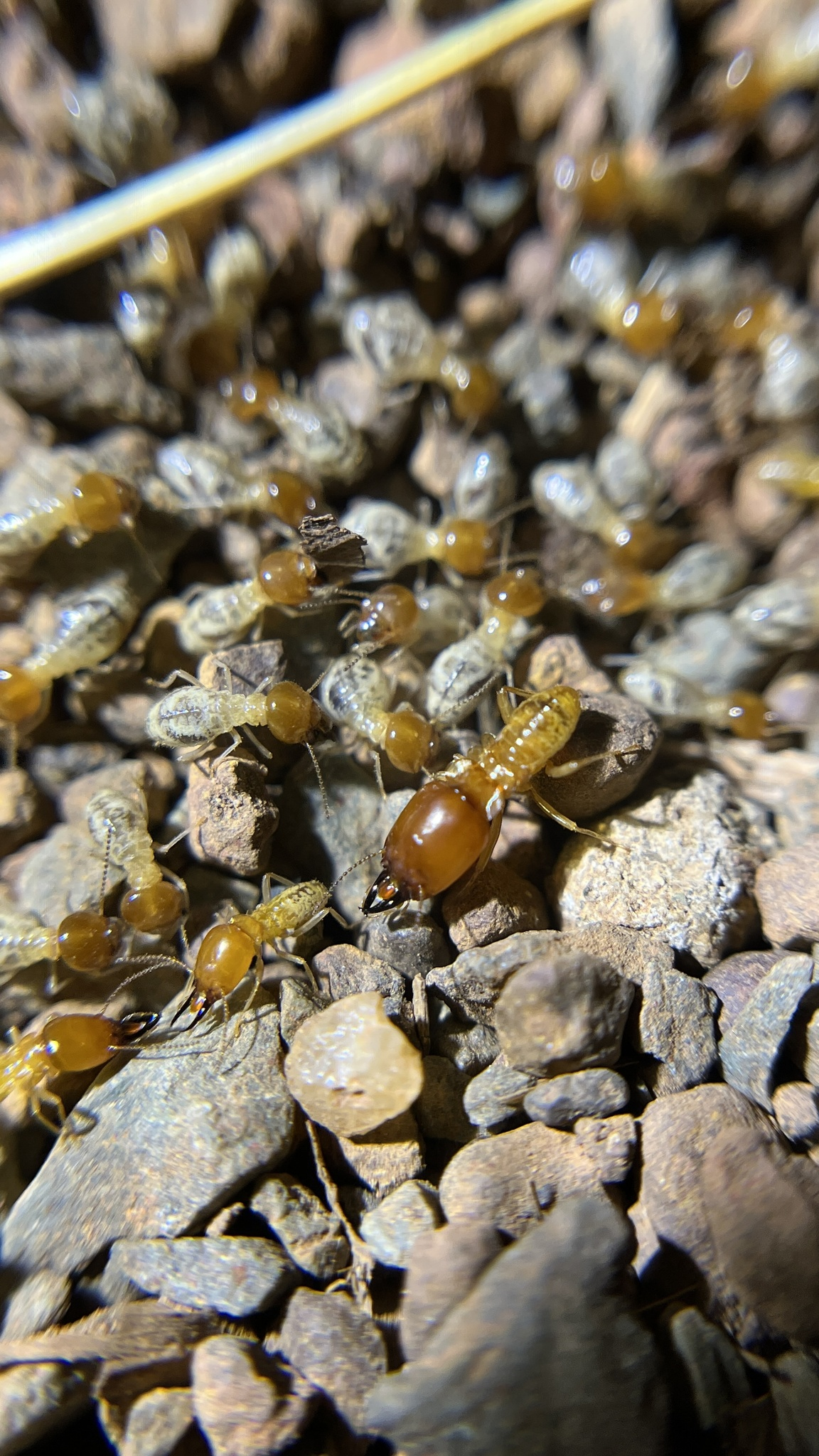

Scientific classification
- Kingdom: Animalia
- Phylum: Arthropoda
- Clade: Pancrustacea
- Class: Insecta
- Order: Blattodea
- Infraorder: Isoptera
- Family: Termitidae
- Genus: Macrotermes
- Species: M. gilvus

Binomial name
- Macrotermes gilvus (Hagen, 1858)

Synonyms
- Termes (Termes) gilvus Hagen, 1858; Junior Synonyms List: Termes azarelii Wasmann, 1896; Termes malayanus Haviland, 1898; Termes (Macrotermes) manilanus Oshima, 1914; Termes (Macrotermes) philippinae Oshima, 1914; Termes (Macrotermes) luzonensis Oshima, 1914; Termes (Termes) copelandi Oshima, 1914; Macrotermes gilvus padangensis Kemner, 1930; Macrotermes gilvus borneensis Kemner, 1933; Macrotermes gilvus latinotum Kemner, 1934; Macrotermes gilvus angusticeps Kemner, 1934; Macrotermes gilvus madurensis Kemner, 1934; Macrotermes gilvus kalshoveni Kemner, 1934

= Macrotermes gilvus =

Species of termite

Macrotermes gilvus is a species of large termites in the family Termitidae; current records of occurrence are from India, Indochina (Cambodia, Myanmar, Thailand, Vietnam) and Malesia (East Timor, Singapore, Malaysia, Indonesia, the Philippines).

They also make termitaria containing fungus combs, which when mature enough, will sprout edible mushrooms.

== Description and phylogeny ==
Macrotermes gilvus is estimated to have likely emerged 2.67 million years ago.

Part of the Macrotermes genus, they are also related to Macrotermes nnandalei and M. chaiglomi. In parts of Indochina they may coexist with Macrotermes carbonarius where they can be distinguished easily by their brown colour.

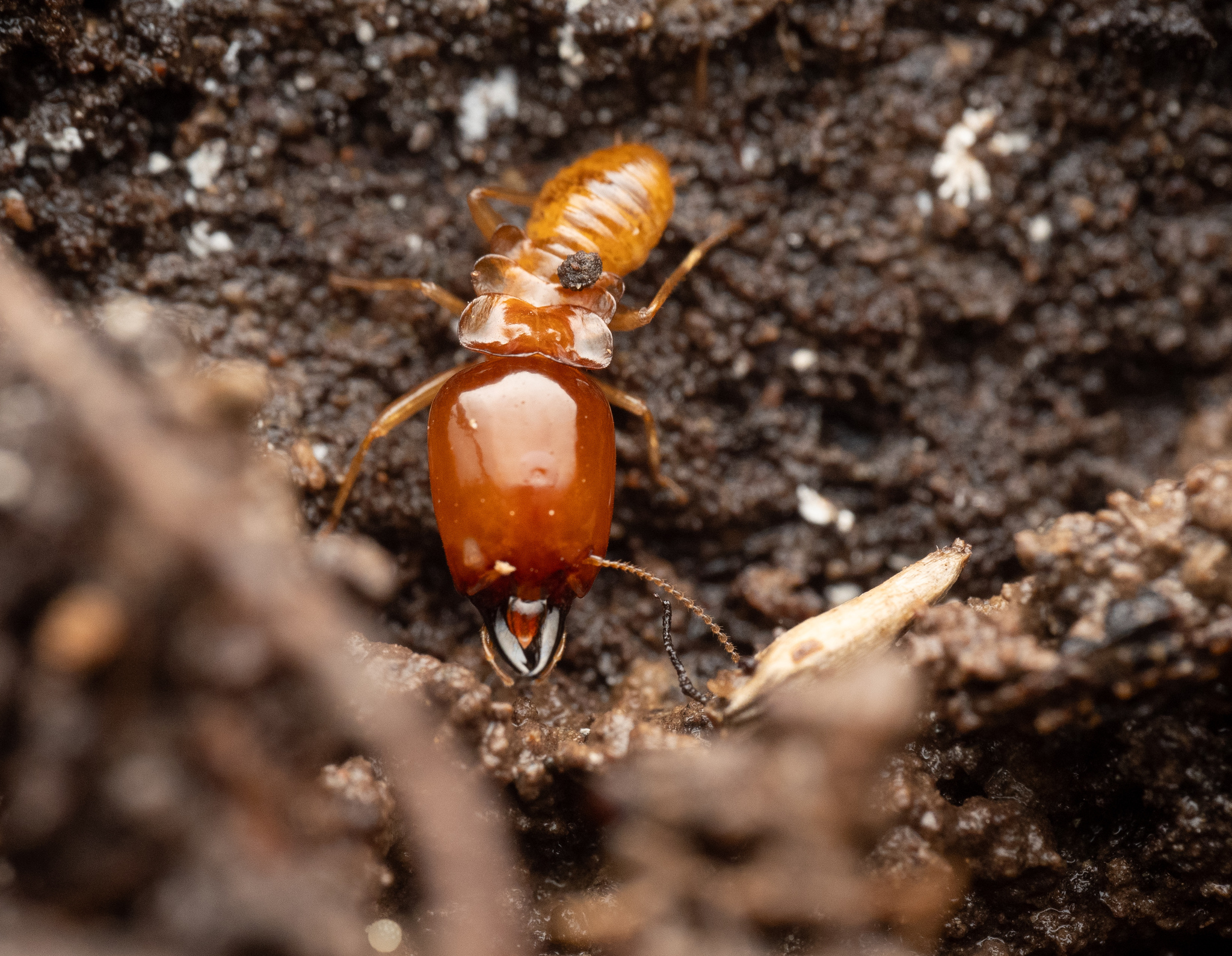
Detail of soldier

== Behavior ==
Macrotermes gilvus termites are typically aggressive with other colonies. They typically forage for fungi after colony establishment.
