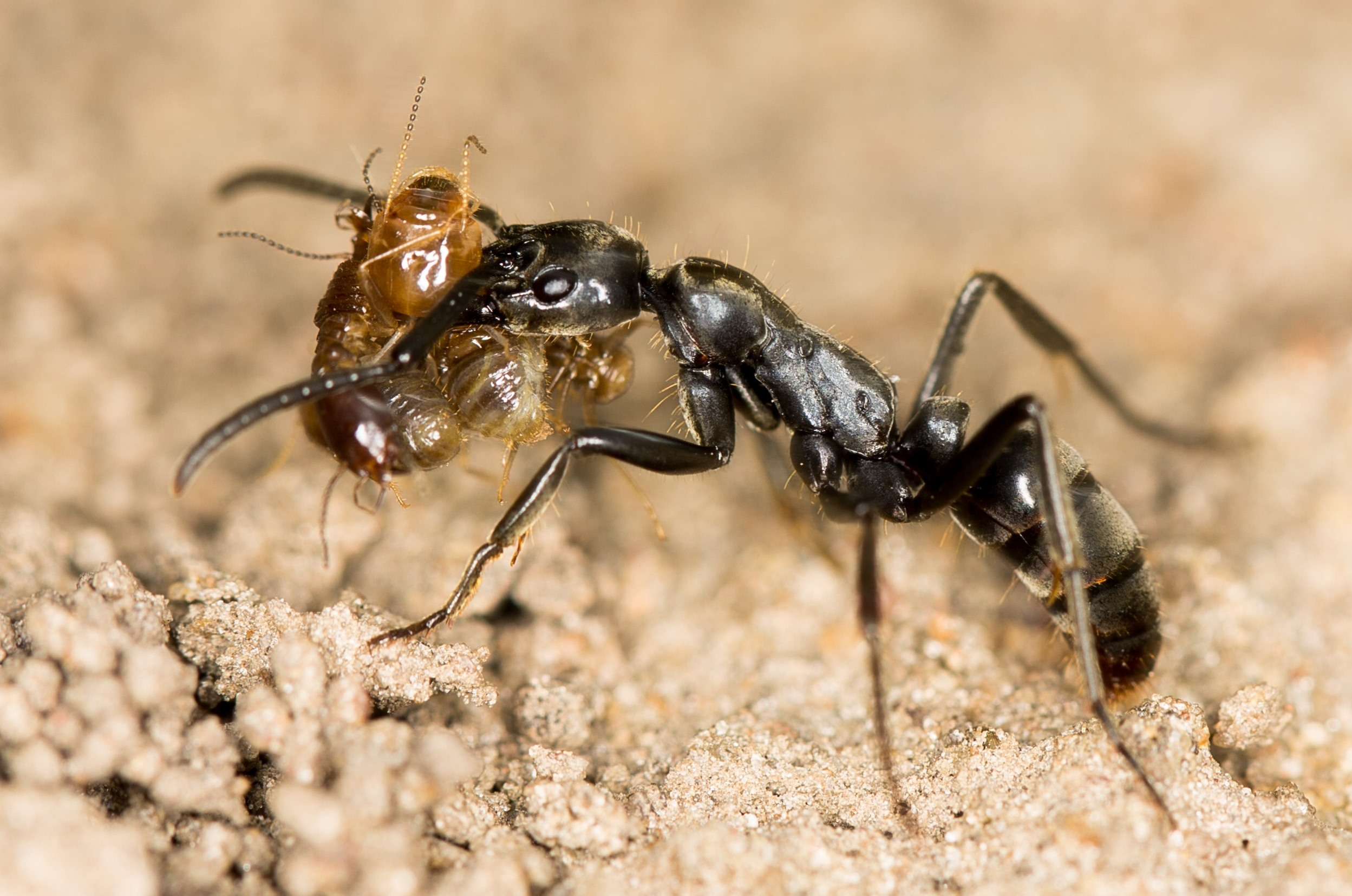
- A major worker with termite prey
- Stridulating workers in a moving column

Scientific classification
- Kingdom: Animalia
- Phylum: Arthropoda
- Clade: Pancrustacea
- Class: Insecta
- Order: Hymenoptera
- Family: Formicidae
- Subfamily: Ponerinae
- Tribe: Ponerini
- Alliance: Grup genus Odontomachus
- Genus: Megaponera; Mayr, 1862
- Species: M. analis

Binomial name
- Megaponera analis (Latreille, 1802)
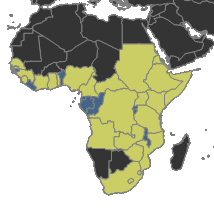
- Distribution Present in country Likely present in country Absent from country

Synonyms
- Formica foetens Fabricius, 1793; Megaponera foetens (Fabricius, 1793); Formica analis Latreille, 1802; Pachycondyla analis Brown, 1994

= Megaponera =

Genus of ants

Megaponera analis is the sole species of the ant genus Megaponera. They are a strictly termite-eating (termitophagous) ponerine ant species widely distributed in Sub-Saharan Africa and most commonly known for their column-like raiding formation when attacking termite feeding sites. Their sophisticated raiding behaviour gave them the common name Matabele ant after the Matabele tribe, fierce warriors who overwhelmed various other tribes during the 1800s. With some individuals reaching up to 25 millimetres (0.98 in) in length, M. analis is one of many of the world's largest ants.

In 2014, the specific name analis, in Latin "anus-related", chosen by Latreille, replaced foetens "stinking", given by Johan Christian Fabricius in 1793, because Guillaume-Antoine Olivier had given the same name Formica foetens to another species in 1792. Both names allude to the fact that the mandibular gland of this ant releases dimethyl disulfide and dimethyl trisulfide, which smell like human feces.

== Taxonomy ==
Megaponera is a genus of ponerine ant first defined by Gustav Mayr in 1862 for the species Formica analis Latreille, 1802, the sole species belonging to the genus to date. In 1994 William L. Brown Jr. synonymised the genus under Pachycondyla even though he lacked phylogenetic justification, thereby changing the name from Megaponera foetens to Pachycondyla analis. In 2014 Schmidt and Shattuck revived Megaponera back to full genus status due to both molecular and morphological evidence. Since foetens was a specific epithet incorrectly used, the name for the species as of June 2014 is Megaponera analis.

=== Subspecies of Megaponera analis ===
Due to its very wide distribution throughout Africa, it is likely that there are many more subspecies of M. analis than those recognised at the moment – some of which may warrant elevation to full species status.

The five currently recognised subspecies of M. analis are:

- M. analis subsp. amazon (Santschi, 1935): Ethiopia
- M. analis subsp. crassicornis (Gerstäcker, 1859): Mozambique
- M. analis subsp. rapax (Santschi, 1914b): Tanzania
- M. analis subsp. subpilosa (Santschi, 1937): Angola
- M. analis subsp. termitivora (Santschi, 1930): DRC

== Morphology ==
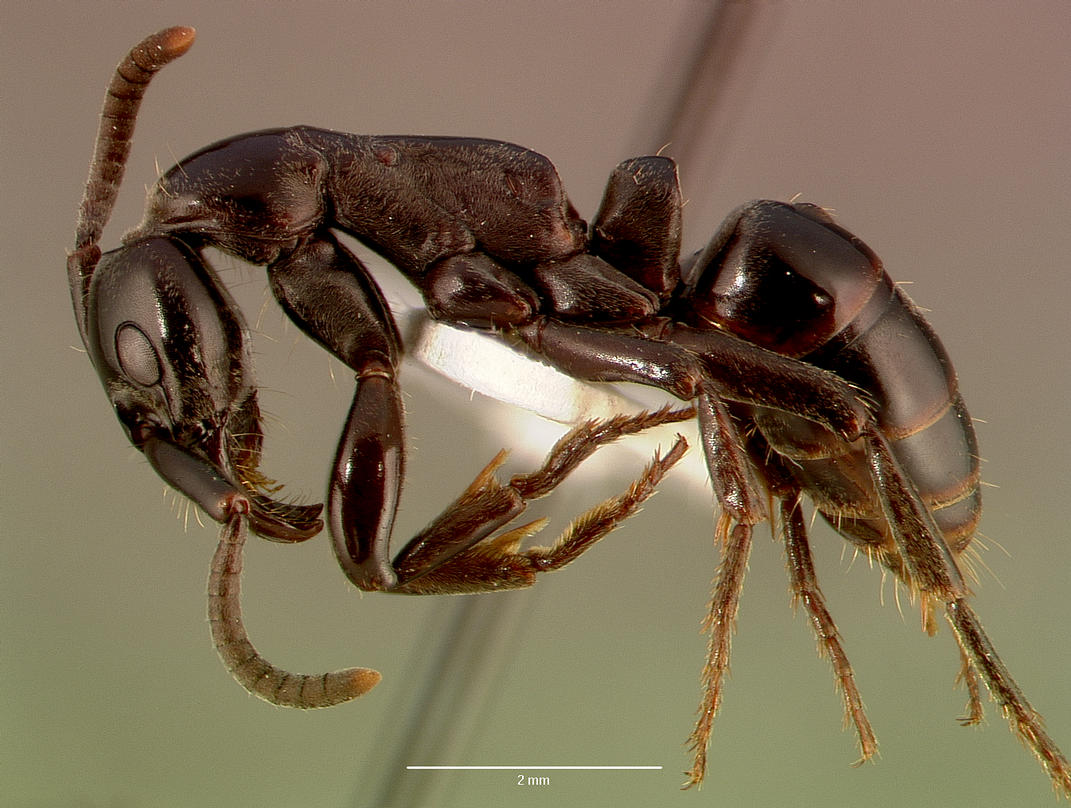
Minor worker

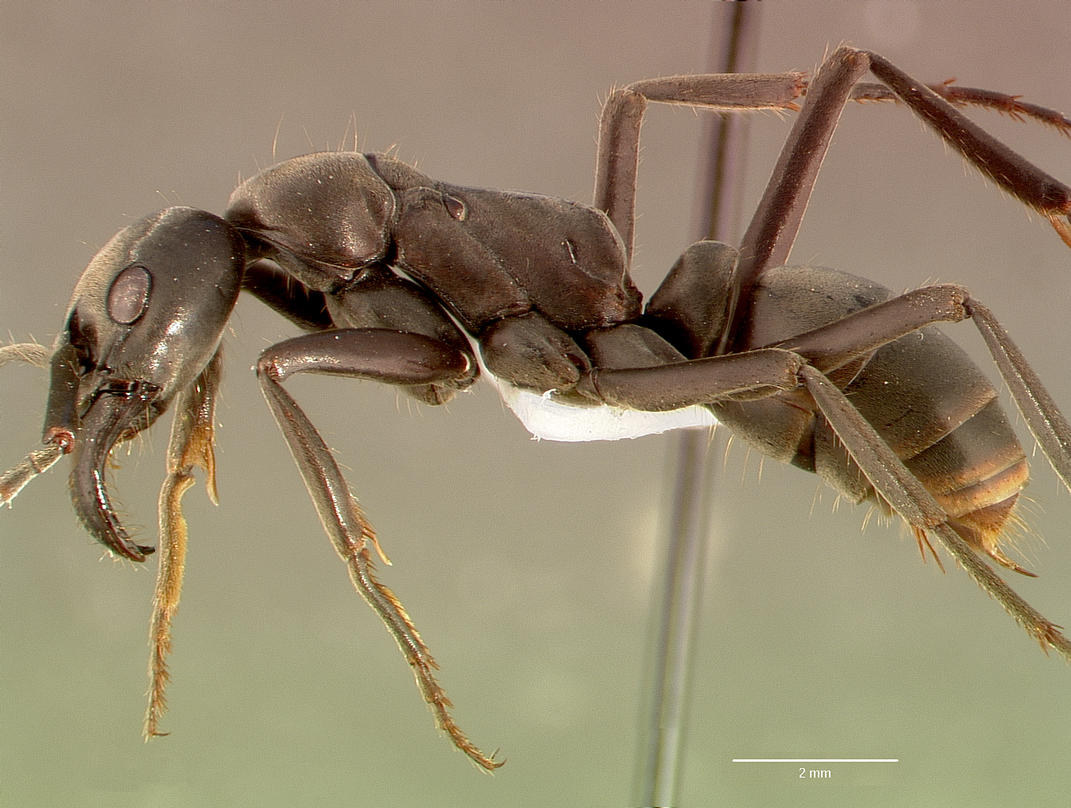
Major worker

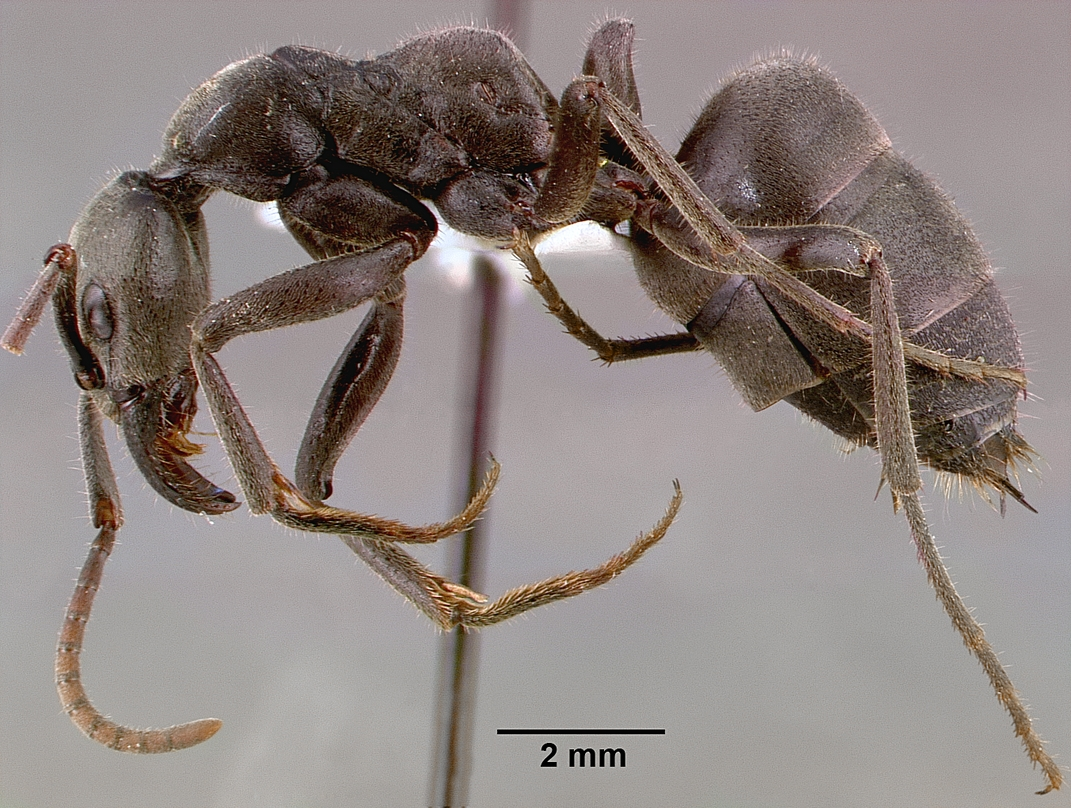
Queen with enlarged gaster

The size of worker ants varies between 5–18 millimetres (0.20–0.71 in), with larger workers making up to 50 percent of the colony. Though it was often suggested that the larger ants also function as gamergates, they were never observed laying fertile eggs, a function solely reserved to the ergatoid queen. Even though M. analis is often referred to as dimorphic, with a major and minor caste, they actually exhibit polyphasic allometry in worker sizes. The variations among the ants are mostly in size and pubescence (with minors having less), although differences in the mandibles have also been observed, with minors having smoother mandibles compared to majors.

== Range and habitat ==
Megaponera analis occurs throughout sub-Saharan Africa from 25° S to 12° N. Its nests are generally subterranean, up to 0.7 metres (2 ft 4 in) deep, and often located next to trees, rocks, or abandoned termite hills. While the nest itself may have more than one entrance, it comprises only one chamber in which the eggs, larvae, cocoons, and the queen are located. Frogs of the species Phrynomantis microps are sometimes found in the nests, and have evolved a skin secretion that inhibits the ants aggression.

== Behaviour ==
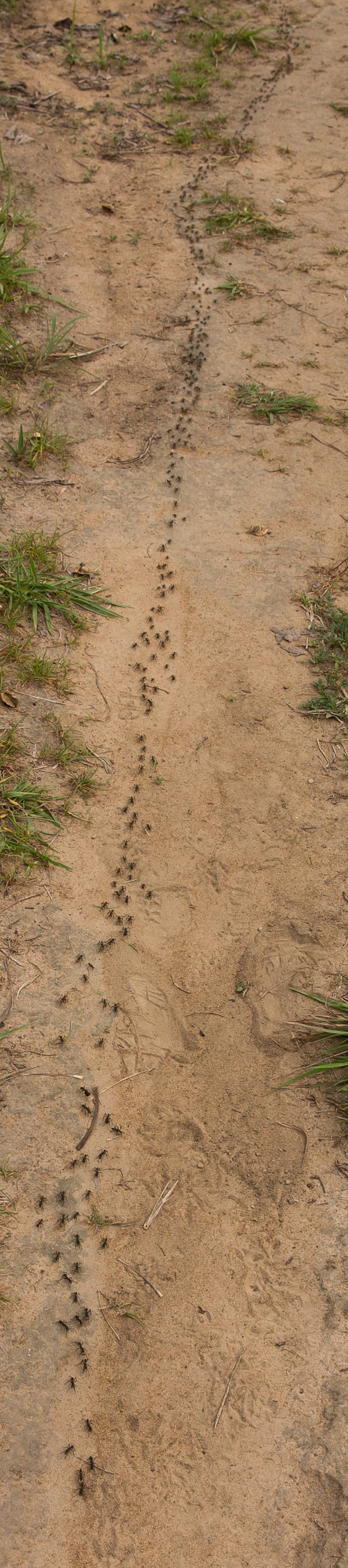
An M. analis raiding column

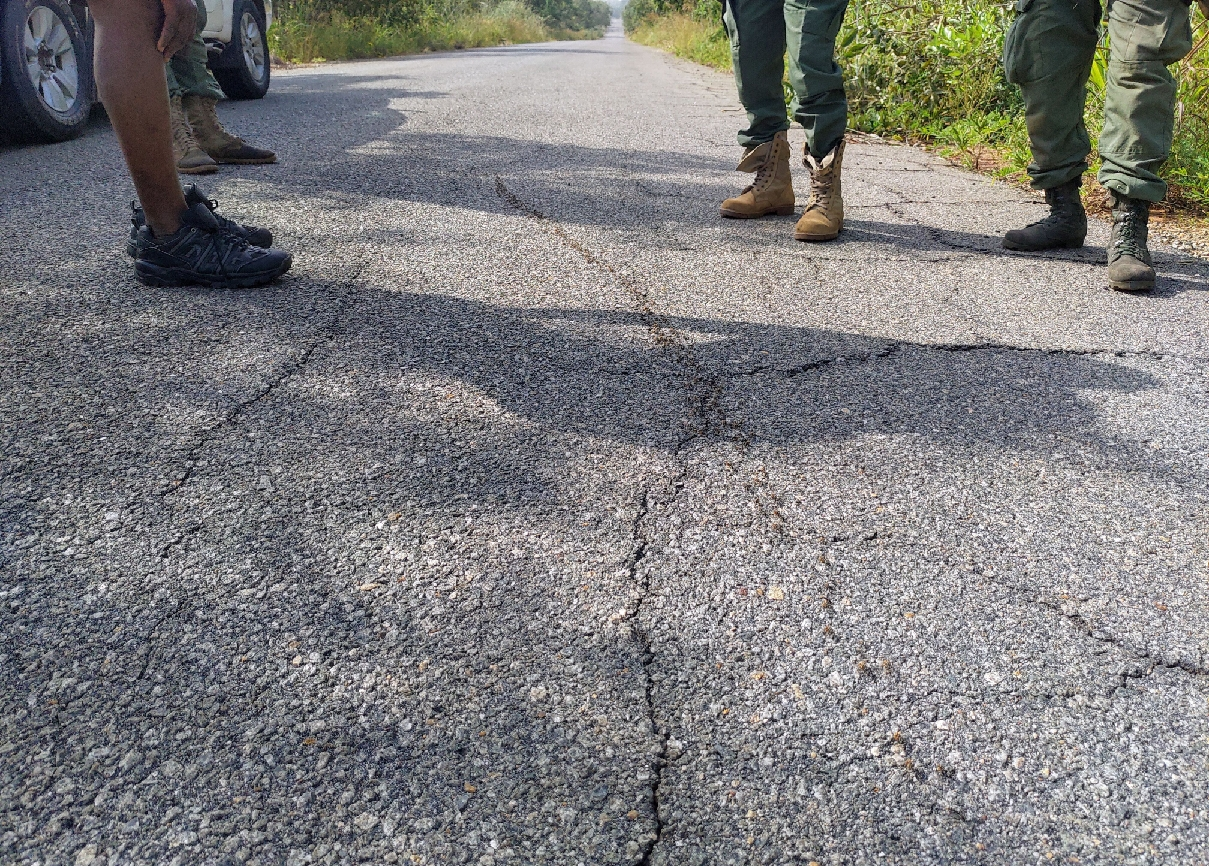
Ants returning from a raid in Yankari Game Reserve, Bauchi, Nigeria

=== Raiding behaviour ===
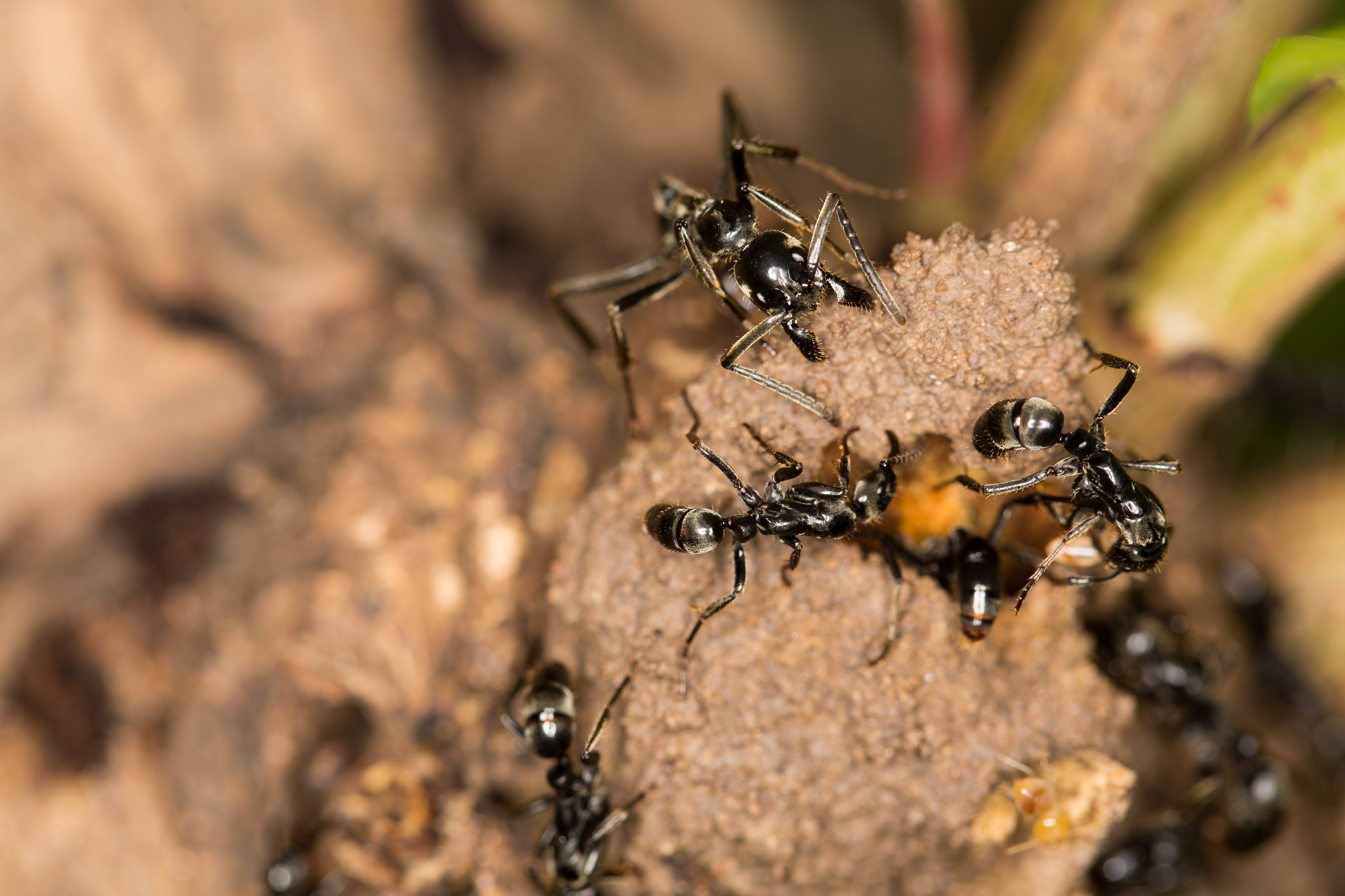
M. analis ants breaking up the protective soil layer of a termite feeding site

The raiding activity of M. analis focuses on dawn and dusk between 6:00–10:00 and 15:00–19:00, with approximately three to five raids occurring per day. There are also observations of a third raiding activity window during the night between 22:00–2:00, although this phase has been poorly studied. M. analis raids focus solely on termites from the subfamily Macrotermitinae and generally consist of 200 to 500 ants.

The general foraging pattern of M. analis starts with scout ants searching an area of approximately 50 m (160 ft) around the nest for termite foraging sites. This searching phase can last up to one hour, and if it is unsuccessful the scout returns to the nest by a circuitous route. If a scout ant finds a potential site, it will start to investigate it without getting into contact with the termites or entering the galleries, before returning by the quickest route to recruit its nestmates to conduct a raid. While the quickest route is often also the shortest, this is not always the case. Scouts have been observed to use deviations on open terrain (like paths) on which they can run twice as fast to reduce travel time on average by 35%.

Although the scout ant is observed to lay a pheromone trail on the return journey to the nest, the other ants seem to be unable to follow this trail without the help of the scout. The scout ant therefore leads the raid from the front, with the other ants following in a column-like formation. Recruitment time varies between 60 and 300 seconds, with all castes taking part in a raid. During the outward journey towards the termites, all ants are laying a pheromone trail, making it much easier for them to find their way back to the nest later without having to rely on the scout ant.

Approximately 20–50 cm (7.9–19.7 in) before contact with the termites, the raiding column stops and agglomerates until all the ants in the column have arrived, forming a sort of circle around the raid leader (the scout). Afterwards the ants rush forward towards the termites in an open formation and overwhelm their prey. During the attack, a division of labour can be observed. While the majors focus mostly on breaking up the protective layer over the foraging galleries of the termites, the minors rush into the galleries to kill the termites through the created openings. After a foraging site has been exploited, the ants congregate at the same place they waited earlier, with the majors carrying the termites, and return to the nest in a column-like formation. These raids are always a single event and ants do not return independently to re-exploit a former raiding site, although the possibility of the scout ant remembering a site and reinvestigating it in the future for a possible second raid cannot be excluded.

=== Colony size and reproduction ===
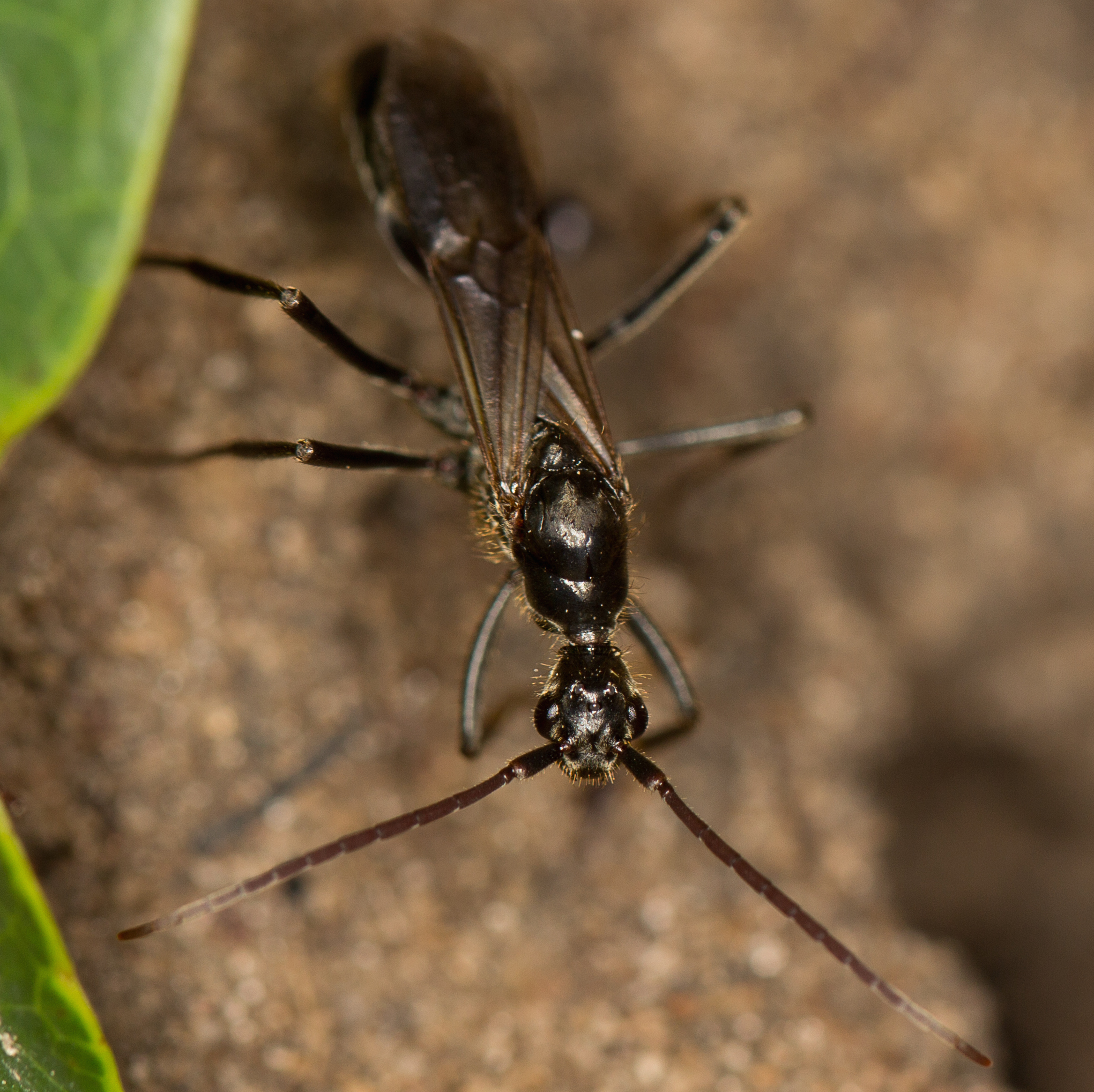
M. analis male

Colony size varies, depending on the location and age of the colony, from 440 to 2300 adult ants. Little is known about the reproduction of M. analis. The alate males of M. analis are often observed leaving and entering the nests of established colonies by using pheromone trails from previous raids as guides to the nest. Since M. analis colonies are obligate termite hunters, a queen could not establish a nest on her own, since she could not conduct a raid against termites without a standing army of worker ants. It is therefore assumed that new colonies are always created through colony fission, with the new queen taking a number of the workers of the old colony with her to create a new colony.

=== Helping behaviour ===
==== Cooperative self defence ====
While cooperative defence of the nest is well known in ants, cooperative self-defence outside of the nest is much less so. When M. analis ants are attacked by driver ants (Dorylus sp.) outside of the nest, they cooperate with one another in an attempt to defend themselves by checking each other's extremities for enemy ants and removing any that are clinging to their legs or antennae.

==== Saving injured individuals ====
During battles against termites some of the ants get injured. The termite soldiers are able to bite off extremities or cling on to ant bodies after their death. These ants have evolved a unique mechanism to deal with this increased foraging cost. The battle-injured ants "call" for help with a pheromone in their mandibular gland (consisting of two chemical compounds: dimethyl disulfide and dimethyl trisulfide), attracting nestmates, who then start to investigate the injured nestmate, pick her up, and carry the injured ant back to the nest. By doing so, they reduce their mortality rate from 32% to close to zero. Inside the nest the clinging termites get removed. If they have lost one or two legs, the ants adapt to four or five legged locomotion to compensate for it, allowing them to reach running speeds similar to a healthy ant. These injured ants are then capable again of performing colony tasks and are even observed in future raids against termites. A model calculated this rescue behaviour to allow a colony to be 28.7% larger than a colony that would not show this behaviour (due to the energy saved by not having to replace the injured workers with new healthy replacements). This is the only invertebrate species known to show such a behaviour towards injured individuals.

The rescue behaviour is also limited to only lightly injured ants (loss of 1-2 limbs); heavily injured ants (that have lost 3 or more limbs) are left behind on the hunting ground. The mechanism with which this is regulated is believed to be relatively simple and based on a two-step process: after an ant is injured the first step is for it to try standing normally on its legs again ("return to an idling position"). Step two is to call for help and cooperate with the responding helpers, but if step one cannot be achieved, then step two will not occur. Heavily injured ants are therefore in a constant loop trying to achieve step one, making it a very simple mechanism of only rescuing ants that are still useful for the colony.

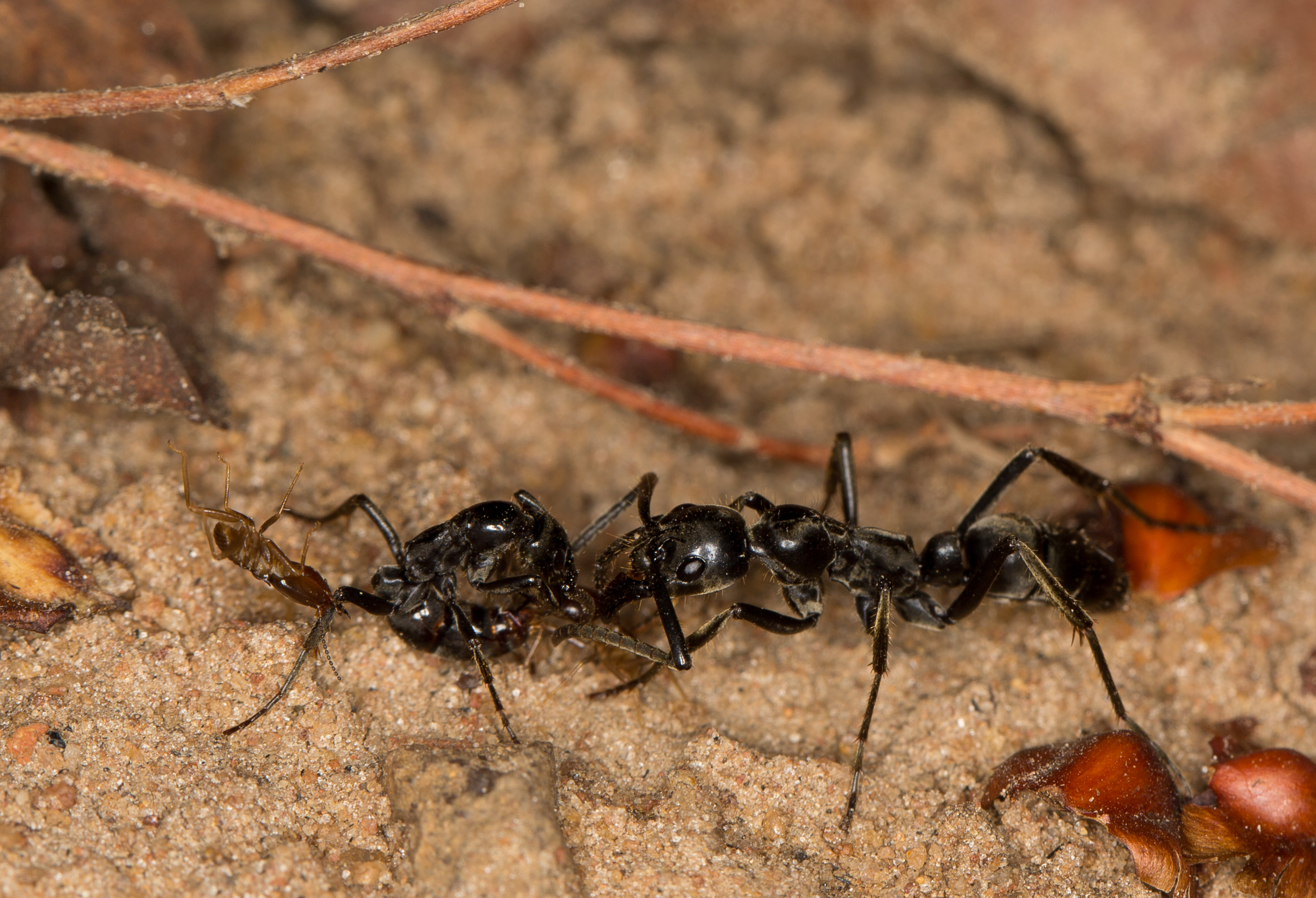
Injured ant (termite bites) being investigated by nestmate at the hunting ground

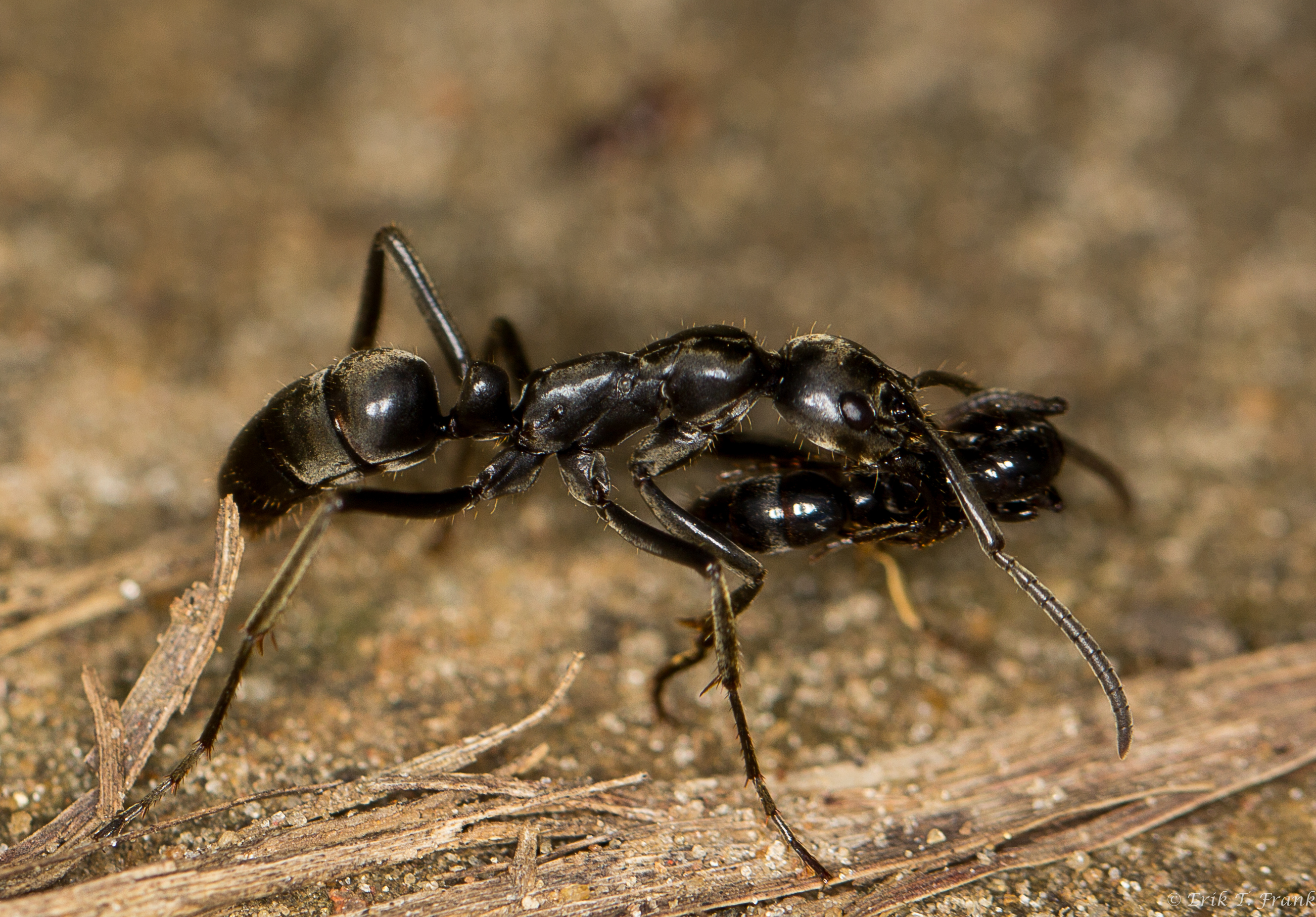
Injured ant being carried back to the nest

==== Wound-care behavior ====
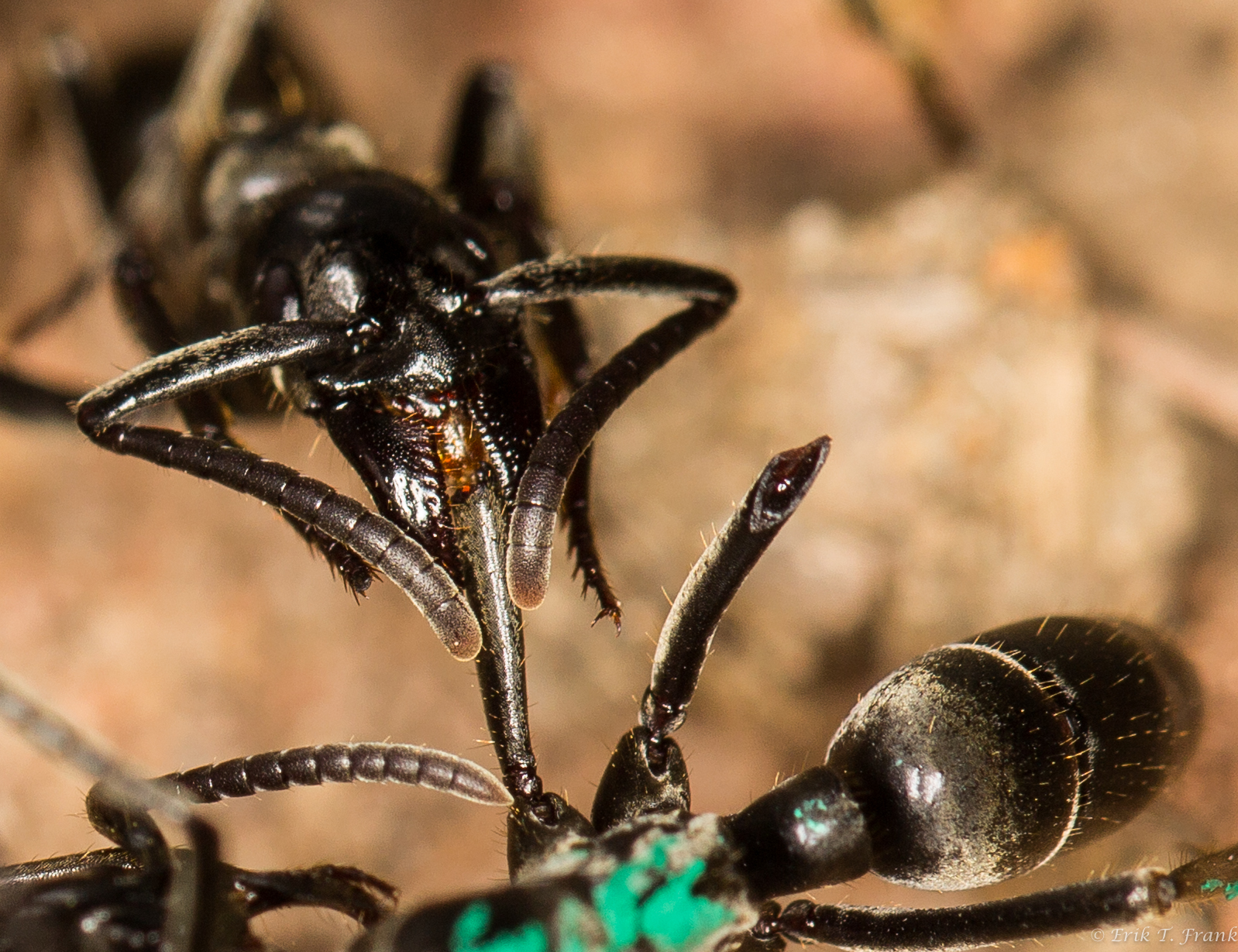
M. analis ant treating the wound of an injured nestmate in the nest

Observations inside the nest have revealed that these ants treat the wounds of their injured nest-mates, making them the first recorded non-human species to consistently take care of the wounds of other individuals. Nest mates grab the damaged limb of the injured ant in their mandibles and hold it in place with their front legs. They then start to "lick" the wound for numerous minutes. This treatment occurs predominantly within the first hour after injury. Without treatment, the typical mortality rate of injured ants is 80%. Wounds often get infected by opportunistic pathogens on the soil surface entering the wound. A major, lethal pathogen in this regard for M. analis is Pseudomonas aeruginosa. Wounds exposed to this pathogen lead to a mortality of close to 90%. Infected ants signal their infected wounds through changes in their cuticular hydrocarbon profile, allowing nestmates to recognise infected wounds and treat them accordingly. This second, therapeutic care phase also includes the application of the secretions from the metapleural gland, which harbor over 100 antimicrobial compounds and proteins. This specialised antimicrobial wound care allows the ants to successfully treat infected wounds, allowing the injured ants to recover from their injuries.

See also:

- Science Magazine summary video of rescue behaviour
- National Geographic: report about the helping behaviour
- Science Magazine summary video of wound treatment
- National Geographic: report about the wound treatment

== Gallery ==
Megaponera analis pictures from Comoé National Park, Ivory Coast
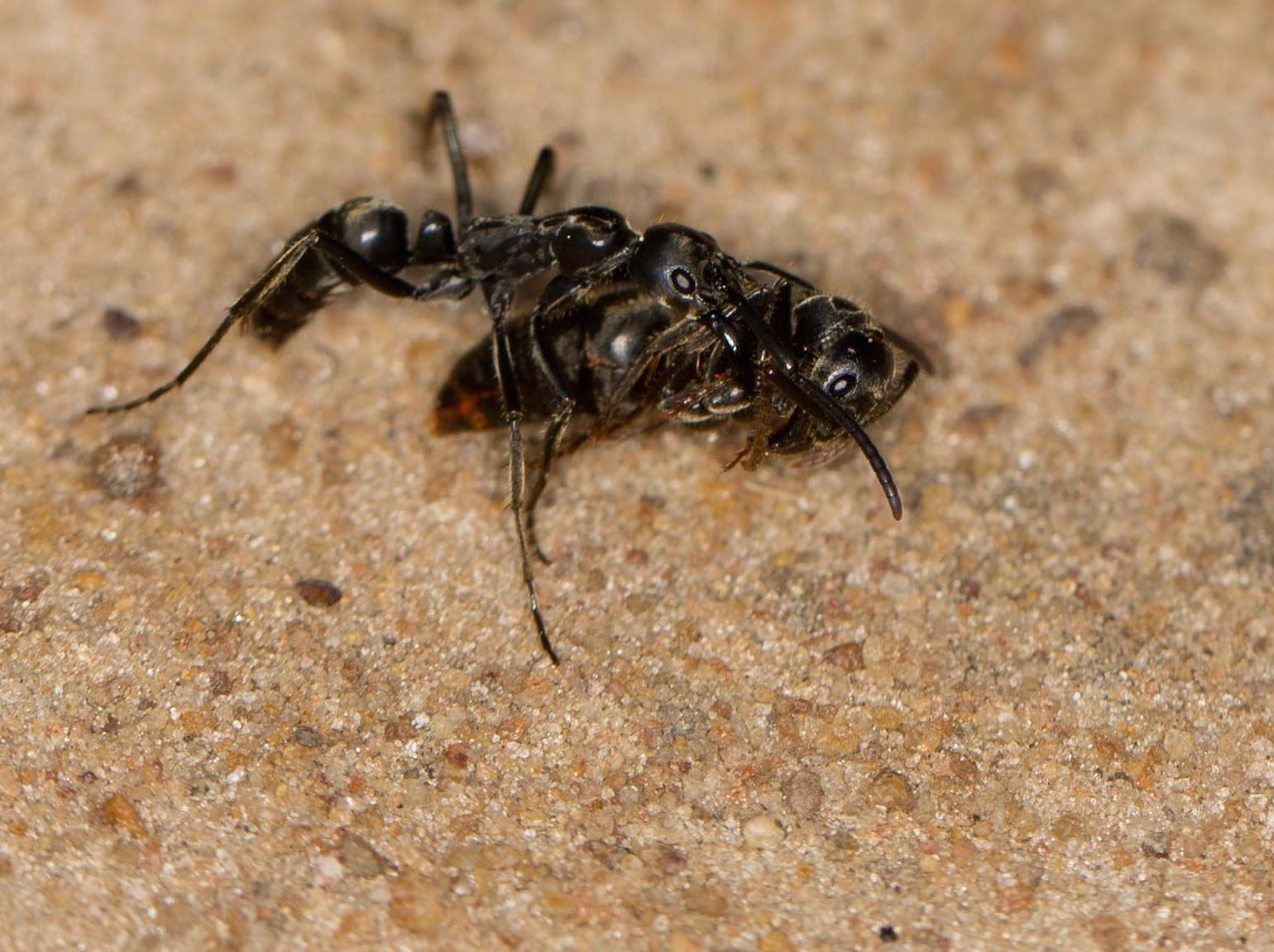
A major carries its queen during a colony fission

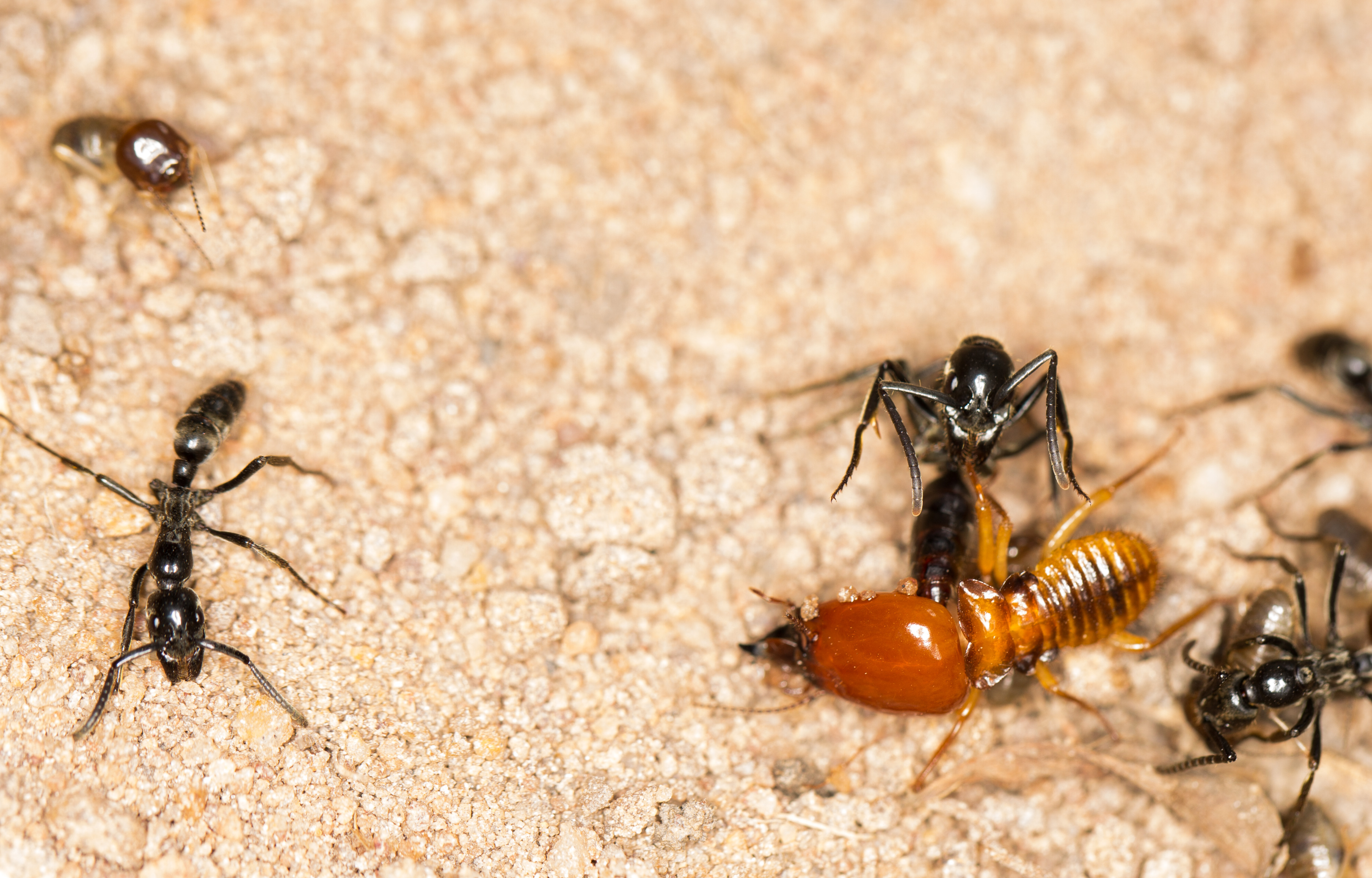
A major kills a Macrotermes bellicosus termite soldier during a raid

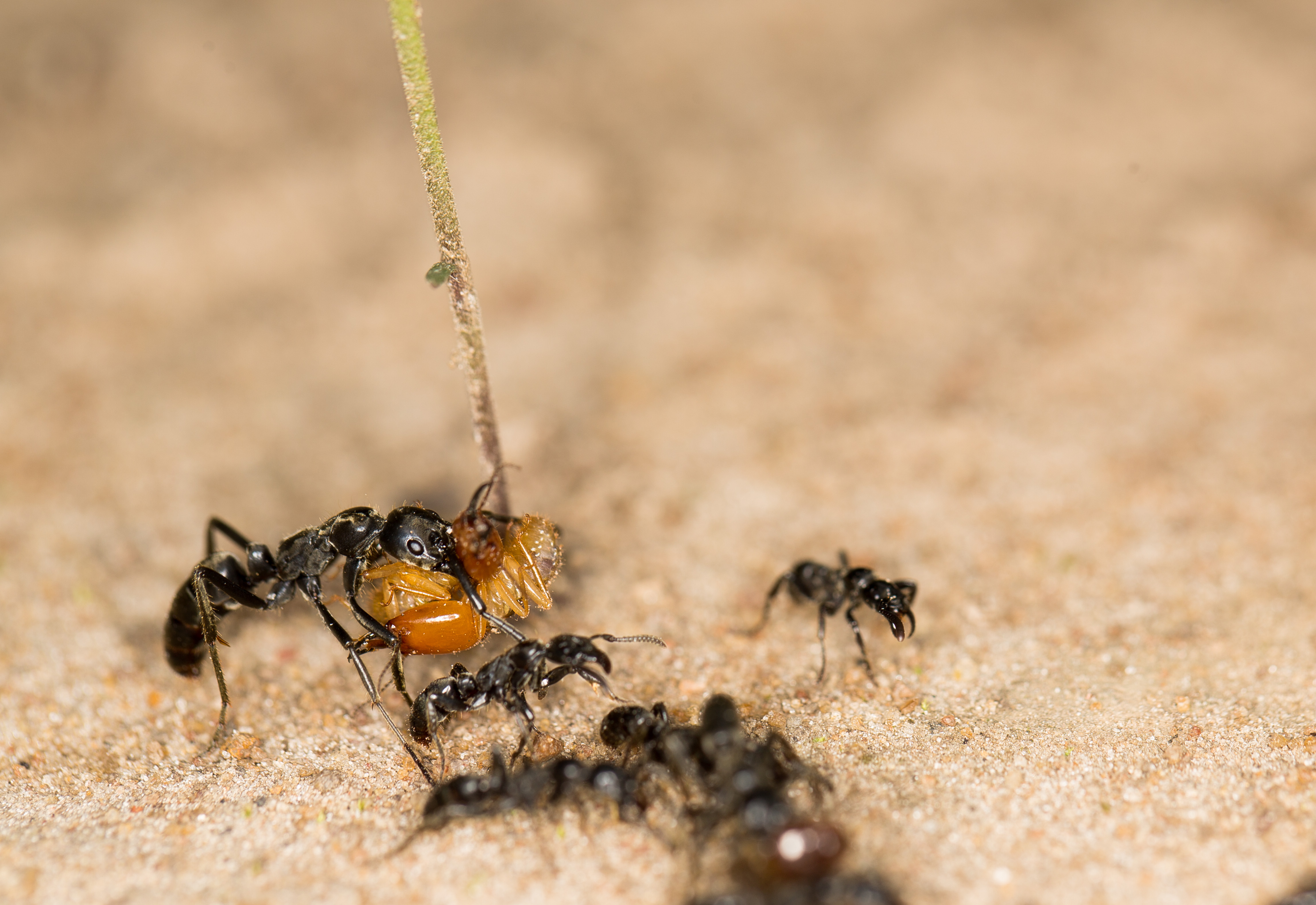
A major carries Macrotermes bellicosus termite soldiers back to the nest, with minors walking next to it

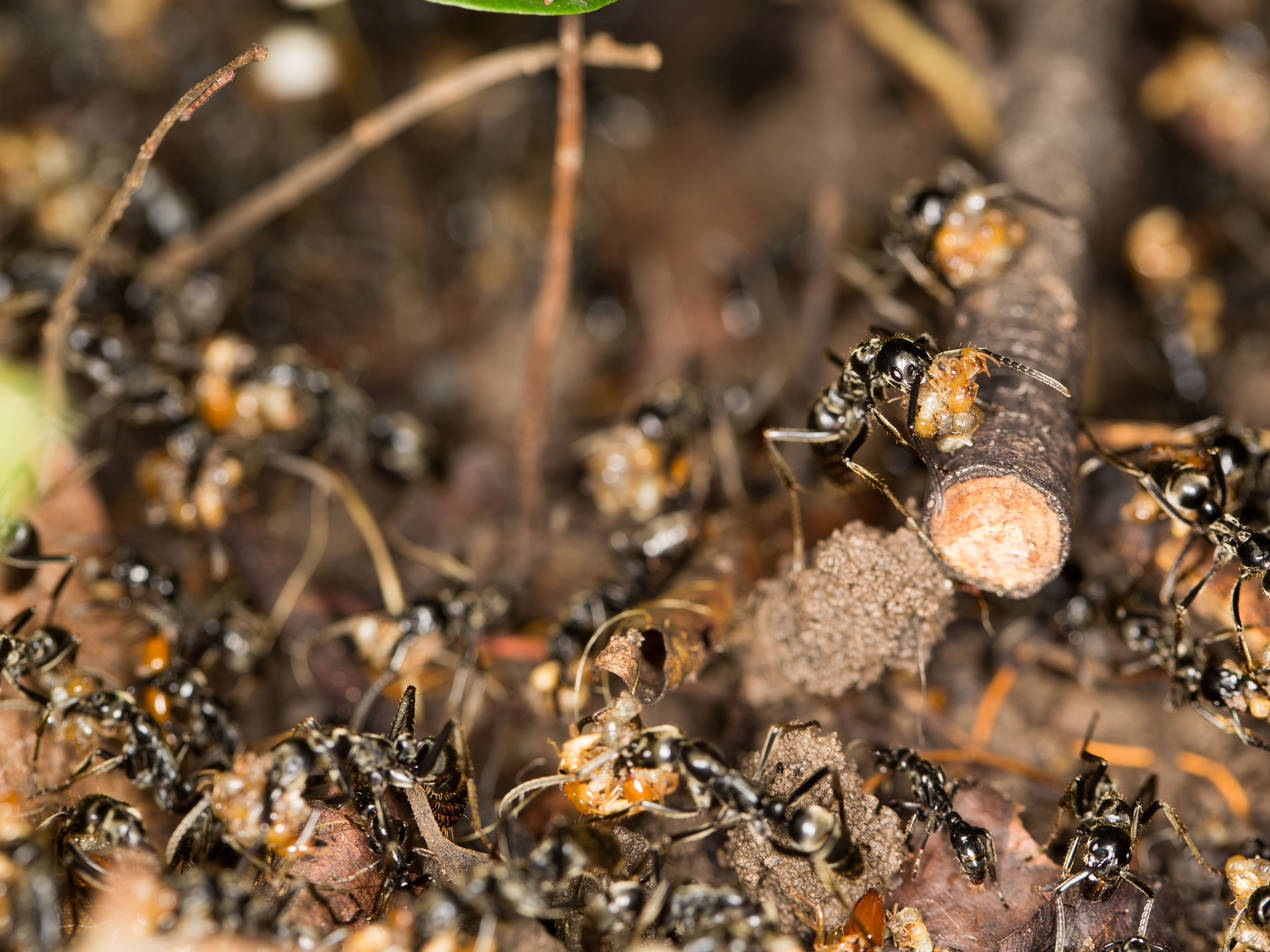
A raiding party collecting Pseudocanthotermes militaris termites after a successful raid

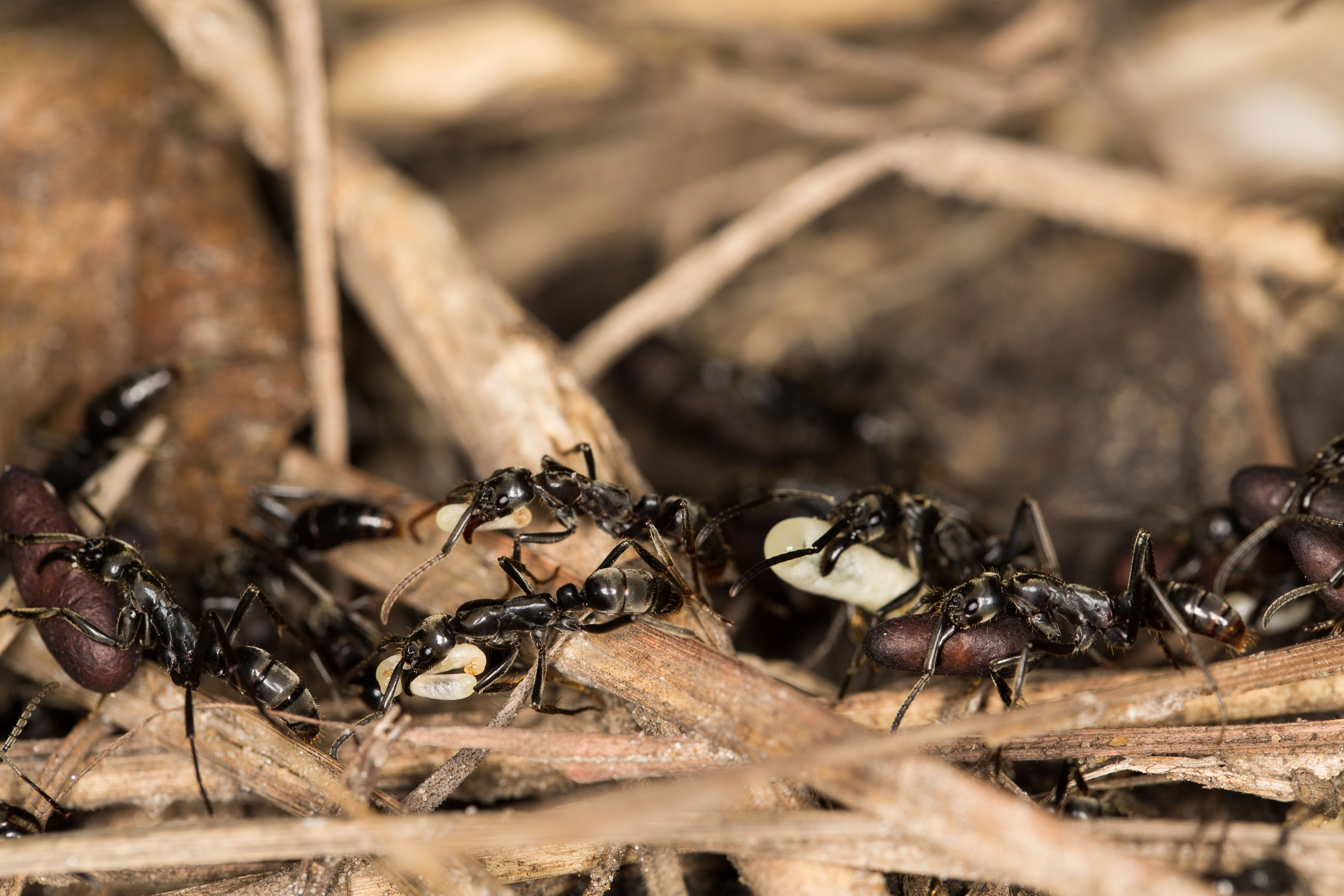
A migration with ants carrying larvae and cocoons

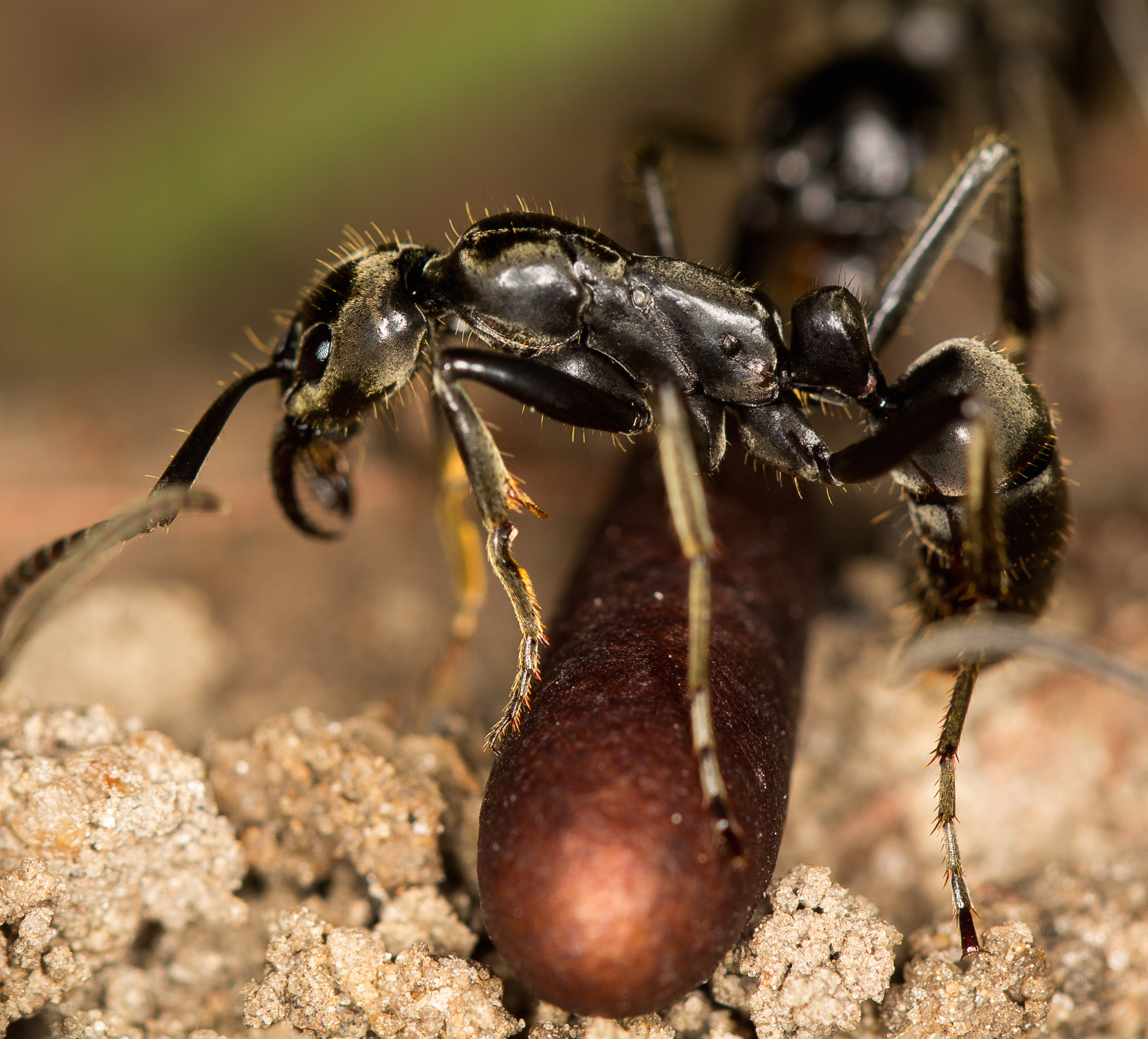
A major worker guarding a cocoon outside the nest
