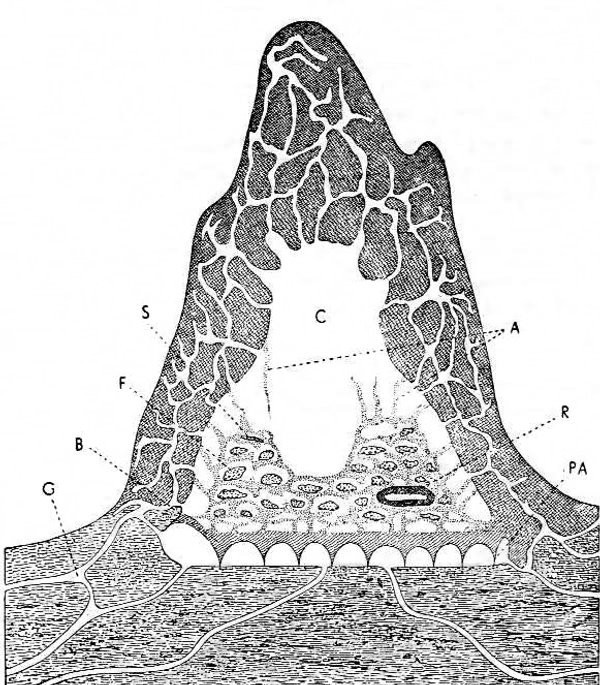
- Structure of a Macrotermes natalensis mound

Scientific classification
- Kingdom: Animalia
- Phylum: Arthropoda
- Clade: Pancrustacea
- Class: Insecta
- Order: Blattodea
- Infraorder: Isoptera
- Family: Termitidae
- Subfamily: Macrotermitinae; Kemner, 1934

Genera
- 14, see text

= Macrotermitinae =

Subfamily of termites

The Macrotermitinae, the fungus-growing termites, constitute a subfamily of the family Termitidae that is only found within the Old World tropics.

This subfamily consists of 12 genera and about 350 species and are distinguished by the fact that they cultivate fungi inside their nests to feed the members of the colony. Despite the popular reputation of termites for breaking down and digesting wood, most termite species do not possess the capability to digest the cellulose in wood. Macrotermitinae instead use their mounds to cultivate fungus in a mutualistic relationship, similar to fungus-growing ants such as leafcutter ants. Worker termites find plant debris and macerate it, chewing and moistening the material. They excrete the resulting fecal pellets inside the mound. Other worker termites use this matter to construct fungal combs. The mycelium then spreads through the comb and digests the plant material into a form that makes for nutritious food for the colony. The mounds are kept humid as possible to encourage rapid fungal growth.

== Identification ==
The labrum of the imago and worker have a sclerotized transverse band at the posterior section; labrum appears divided by a "hinge" of hyaline tissue. Mesentero-proctodeal junction with four lobes.

== Colony structure ==
Macrotermitinae has a complex colony system. A mature Macrotermitinae colony consists of a royal pair, sterile caste, winged reproductive called "alates" and young ones. A royal pair are a king and queen which are the only ones capable of reproduction. The sterile caste is made up of workers (major workers and minor workers) and soldiers (major soldiers and minor soldiers). The royal pair produces workers, soldiers and alates (future royal pairs). The royal pair lives in the "royal chamber" where the queen continuously lays eggs when the king mates with her. Young ones are immature workers, soldier and alates. They live in the royal chamber after they hatch. Workers concentrate on colony process, for example collecting dead plant material, making the fungal comb, brood care, taking care of young ones etc. Soldiers protect the colony.

== Distribution ==
The Macrotermitinae subfamily has a widespread distribution through the tropics of Africa, the Middle East, and southern and southeastern Asia, but it is not present in Australia or the New World. Fossil evidence from Tanzania show that the Macrotermitinae had developed agriculture about 31 million years ago. Phylogenetic analysis places the development of fungiculture several million years after the loss of gut protozoa by the ancestor of the Termitidae family, which is estimated to have happened between 50 and 80 million years ago.

== Ecology ==
Like other termites, Macrotermitinae are soil engineers, mixing their salivary secretions with soil particles to make their strong, hard mounds and galleries. Their mounds are some of the largest built by any species of termite, with volumes of thousands of litres and lasting for many decades. They are probably the most complex mound colonies of any insect group. There are 11 accepted genera in the Macrotermitinae and about 330 species, with the greatest diversity being in Africa. About 40 species of Termitomyces have been identified as symbionts. In contrast to the fungus-growing ants in the tribe Attini, the Termitomyces often bear fruiting bodies which produce spores, and it is believed that transmission of the fungus to other termites is mainly by horizontal transmission (sibling to sibling) rather than by vertical transmission (mother to daughter). Some species are an exception to this, and in all five species of the genus Microtermes tested, the symbiont fungi did not bear sexual fruiting bodies, and transmission was through the maternal route. Another exception was the single species Macrotermes bellicosus where again the fungus did not fruit, and where transmission was paternal.

They have a rather rigid caste system, with little flexibility after the early instar stage. They also exhibit complex behavioural activities and their presence in an arid or semi-arid area can be dominant over other termite species. As compared to other higher termites however, they show some primitive features and have failed to evolve soil consumption.

The mound contains galleries and chambers in which the termites grow fungi as symbionts. The fungi concerned are species of Termitomyces; it is unclear whether one species of termite is always associated with one species of fungus, and it is probable that several species of termite may utilise a single fungal species. The worker termites bring plant material such as dried grass, decaying wood and leaf litter, back to the mound. This material is chewed up and semi-digested by the termites, fertilised with their faeces and placed in the chambers where it is quickly colonised by the fungus to form a "fungus comb". The termites cultivate these fungus gardens, adding more substrate as required, and removing the older parts of the comb for consumption by all members of the colony.

In addition, some species feed on various types of living and dead plant material including wood, but not on decomposing vegetation; these termites have a similar microbial gut flora to other species of termite.

== Life cycle ==
Macrotermitinae like most eusocial insects primarily reproduce through a mass-swarming event known as a nuptial flight, of which the releasing of mature winged sexuals (alates) is coordinated with neighboring colonies and triggered by seasonal rainfalls. The nuptial flights of most species are nocturnal in nature although some are crepuscular or diurnal.

Shortly after a nuptial flight, the alates quickly remove their wings and set off to form pairs consisting of the male (king) and female (queen) individuals respectively. The fully claustral royal pairs rapidly sequester themselves within the clay rich sandy soils of their environment and form a copularium, also known as a claustral chamber. The pairs mate and soon eggs are laid over a couple days, which can take anywhere from 2 – 4 weeks to hatch into several dozen nymphs that can take anywhere between 1 – 3 months to mature into the first workers and soldiers.

Symbiont life cycle

Horizontal transmission

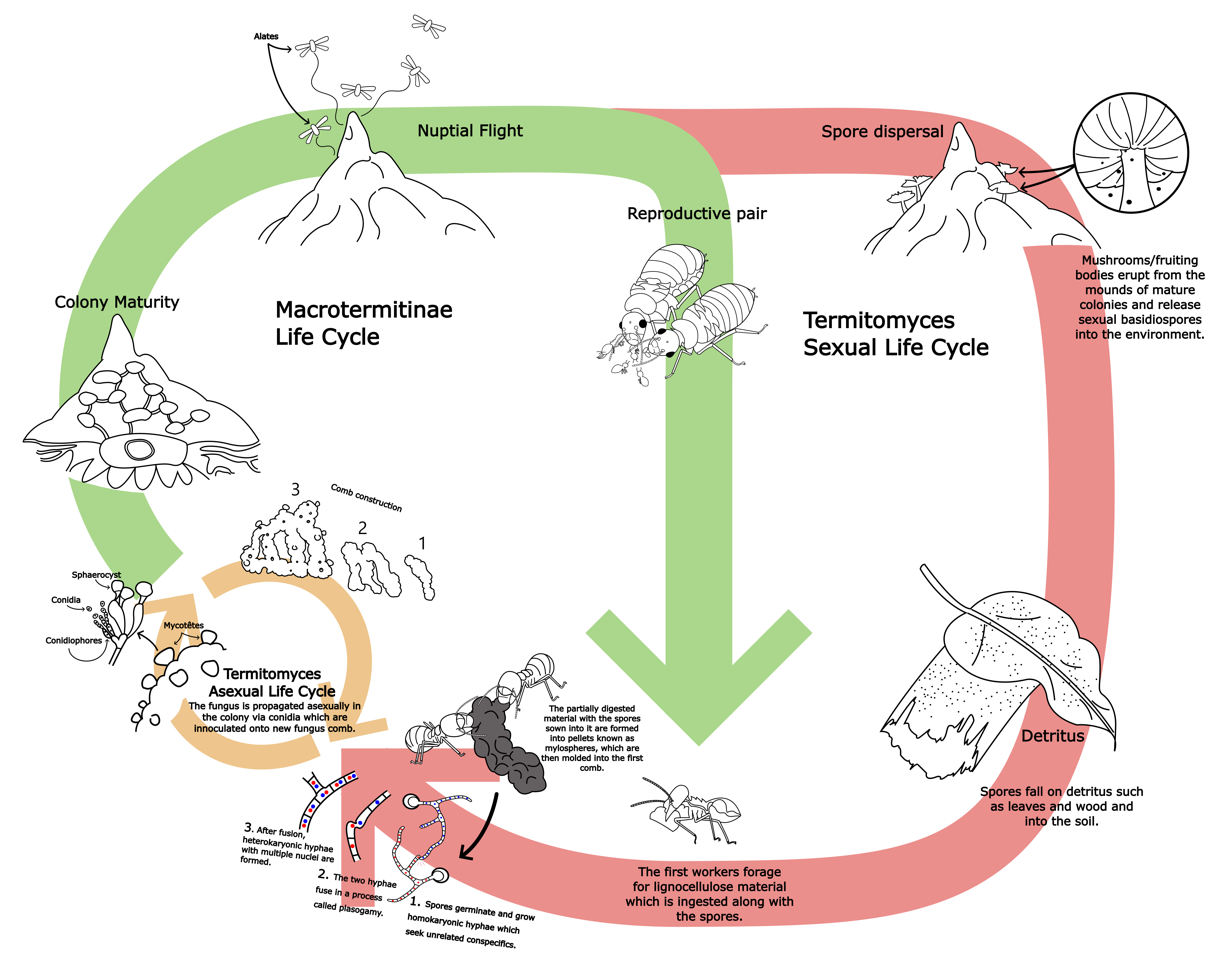
General life cycle of Macrotermitinae

Around the time of the maturity and emergence of the first foraging workers, the appearance of fruiting bodies or mushrooms can be observed sprouting from the mounds of mature Macrotermitinae colonies, typically between 1/2 – 3 months after nuptial flights. The mushrooms release sexual spores (basidiospores) which are wind dispersed into the environment. The nanitic workers pick up these spores incidentally as they forage for lignocellulose detritus; broadly consisting of decaying leaf, wood and grass debris with which the spores had settled upon, and which in turn are ingested and partially digested along with the collected detritus. The detritus along with the spores is then formed into round pellets known as mylospheres, which are then molded into the primordial fungus comb. The spores after having survived the passage through the gut of their termite host begin to germinate into homokaryonic hyphae which rapidly colonize the new fungus comb. The resulting homokaryonic hyphae then fuse with unrelated homokaryons of the same species in a process called plasmogamy, resulting in a heterokaryon with multiple genetically distinguished nuclei.

Due to this method of sexual reproduction, a mixed culture of many different genotypes exist within the fungus gardens of young Macrotermitinae colonies. In contrast, mature colonies are known to only have one singularly cloned Termitomyces strain. A monoculture likely arises in a colony through positive-frequency dependent selection, in which a genotype outcompetes others via preference by the termites for the most vigorously productive and prolific strain. As the fungus grows, white nutrient rich spheres known as mycotêtes, otherwise known as "nodules" or sporodochium, begin to grow on the comb and are primarily what the termites eat. The mycotêtes contain substructures known as conidiophores that form asexual spores (conidia) that are used to asexually propagate the fungus in the colony. The fungus genotype that exhibits the highest production of mycotêtes is generally preferred by the termites, resulting in the high expression of that strain which over time leads to the emergence of a monoculture in the colony. Similar but different looking structures known as primordia also form and are precursors to the sexual fruiting bodies of Termitomyces, although their growth is normally suppressed by the consumption of the primordia by the termites.

In most Macrotermitinae, the above described is how their Termitomyces symbiont is propagated generation-to-generation. Few known exceptions exist, the most prominent being Macrotermes bellicosus of the genus Macrotermes and species belonging to the genus Microtermes. In the case of the exceptions, the symbiont is vertically transmitted, in which the royal termite pair are the ones to carry and propagate the fungus every new generation and in which the fungus is always asexually propagated via parent-to-offspring with no sexual reproduction of the symbiont.

== Genera ==
- Acanthotermes
- Allodontermes
- Ancistrotermes
- Euscaiotermes
- Hypotermes
- Macrotermes
- Megaprotermes
- Microtermes
- Odontotermes
- Protermes
- Pseudacanthotermes
- Synacanthotermes

== Gallery ==
A Macrotermitinae mound in the Okavango Delta just outside Maun, Botswana

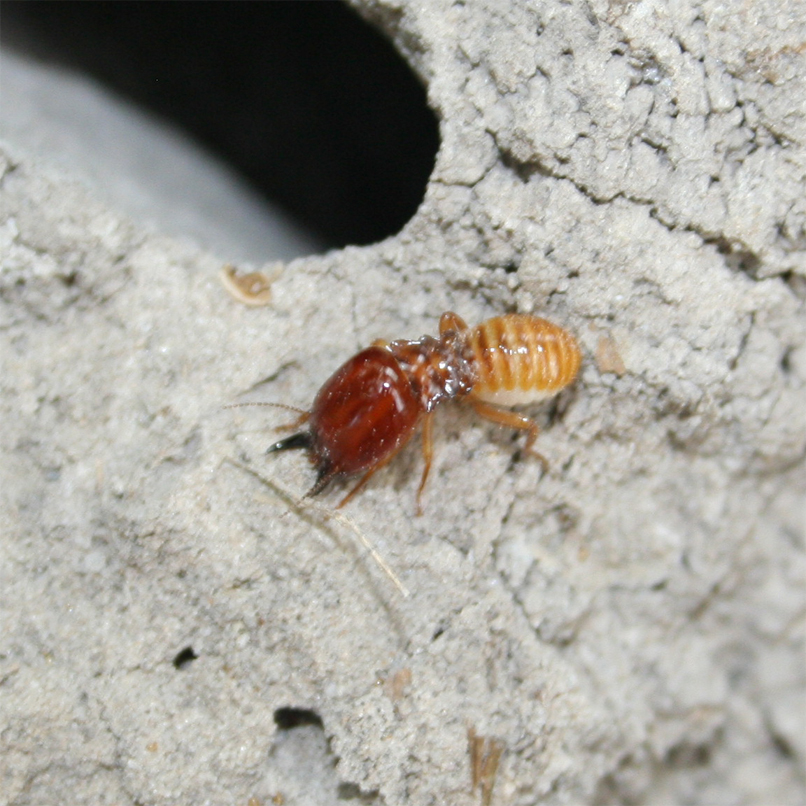
A termite soldier (Macrotermitinae) in the Okavango Delta

An ant of the genus Megaponera with a captured worker termite (Macrotermitinae) in the Okavango Delta, Botswana

Worker termites (Macrotermitinae) closing a newly exposed shaft inside a termite mound to prevent the entry of predators

== See also ==
- Non-human agriculture
