= Streptomyces smaragdinus =

Scientific classification
- Domain: Bacteria
- Kingdom: Bacillati
- Phylum: Actinomycetota
- Class: Actinomycetia
- Order: Streptomycetales
- Family: Streptomycetaceae
- Genus: Streptomyces
- Species: S. smaragdinus

Binomial name
- Streptomyces smaragdinus Schwitalla et al. 2020

Type strain
- RB5

Species of bacterium

Streptomyces smaragdinus is a Gram-positive bacterium species from the genus of Streptomyces which has been isolated from the gut of the termite Macrotermes natalensis.

== See also ==
- List of Streptomyces species
