= Macrotermes convulsionarius =

Scientific classification
- Kingdom: Animalia
- Phylum: Arthropoda
- Clade: Pancrustacea
- Class: Insecta
- Order: Blattodea
- Infraorder: Isoptera
- Family: Termitidae
- Genus: Macrotermes
- Species: M. convulsionarius

Binomial name
- Macrotermes convulsionarius (König, 1779)

Synonyms
- Termes convulsionarii König, 1779; Termes estherae Desneux, 1908

Species of termite

Macrotermes convulsionarius is a species of termite of the family Termitidae. It is native to India and Sri Lanka. Soldiers are very large with well developed mandibles. It is a major pest of many wood works in buildings. Flagellated bacteria such as Bacillus, Acinitobacter, Salmonella, Enterobacter, and Enterococcus are found abundant in gut of M. convulsionarius.
