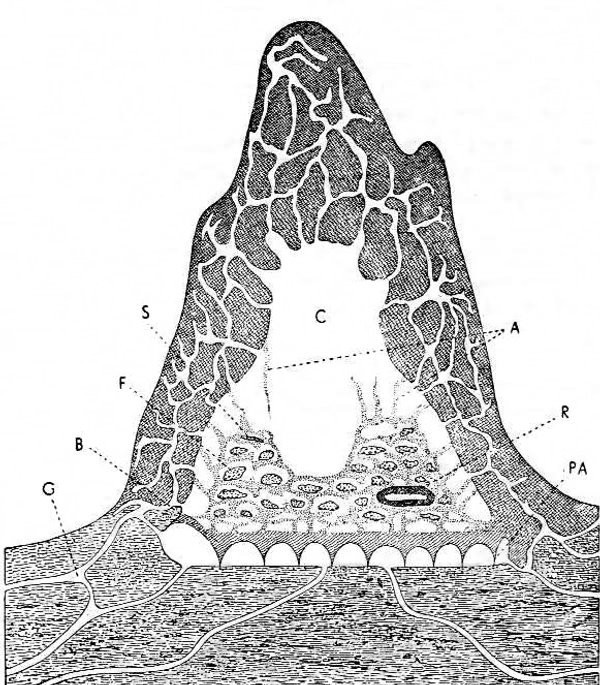
- Structure of an M. natalensis mound

Scientific classification
- Kingdom: Animalia
- Phylum: Arthropoda
- Clade: Pancrustacea
- Class: Insecta
- Order: Blattodea
- Infraorder: Isoptera
- Family: Termitidae
- Subfamily: Macrotermitinae
- Genus: Macrotermes; Holmgren, 1910

Species
- See text

Synonyms
- Gnathotermes Holmgren 1912; Tumulitermes Sjöstedt 1924; Bellicositermes Emerson 1925; Amplitermes Sjöstedt 1926

= Macrotermes =

Genus of termites

Macrotermes is a genus of termites belonging to the subfamily Macrotermitinae and widely distributed throughout Africa and South-East Asia. Well-studied species include Macrotermes natalensis and M. bellicosus.

Like other genera in the Macrotermitinae, they consume dead plant material indirectly by cultivating a basidiomycete fungus of the genus Termitomyces on galleries inside – often very large – termite mounds. Frequently at the beginning of the rainy season, enormous swarms of winged flying adults disperse to establish new colonies.

Spores are sown on the wood in the nest and treated with a growth hormone. The termites feed on the resulting fungus garden. The fungi produce heat in the nest, which rises towards the closed chimney. The heat is exchanged via the chimney, and its smaller tunnels that lead to the surface. Carbon dioxide and oxygen are exchanged near the surface of the nest, and workers may open or block individual tunnels to regulate temperature.

== Life cycle ==
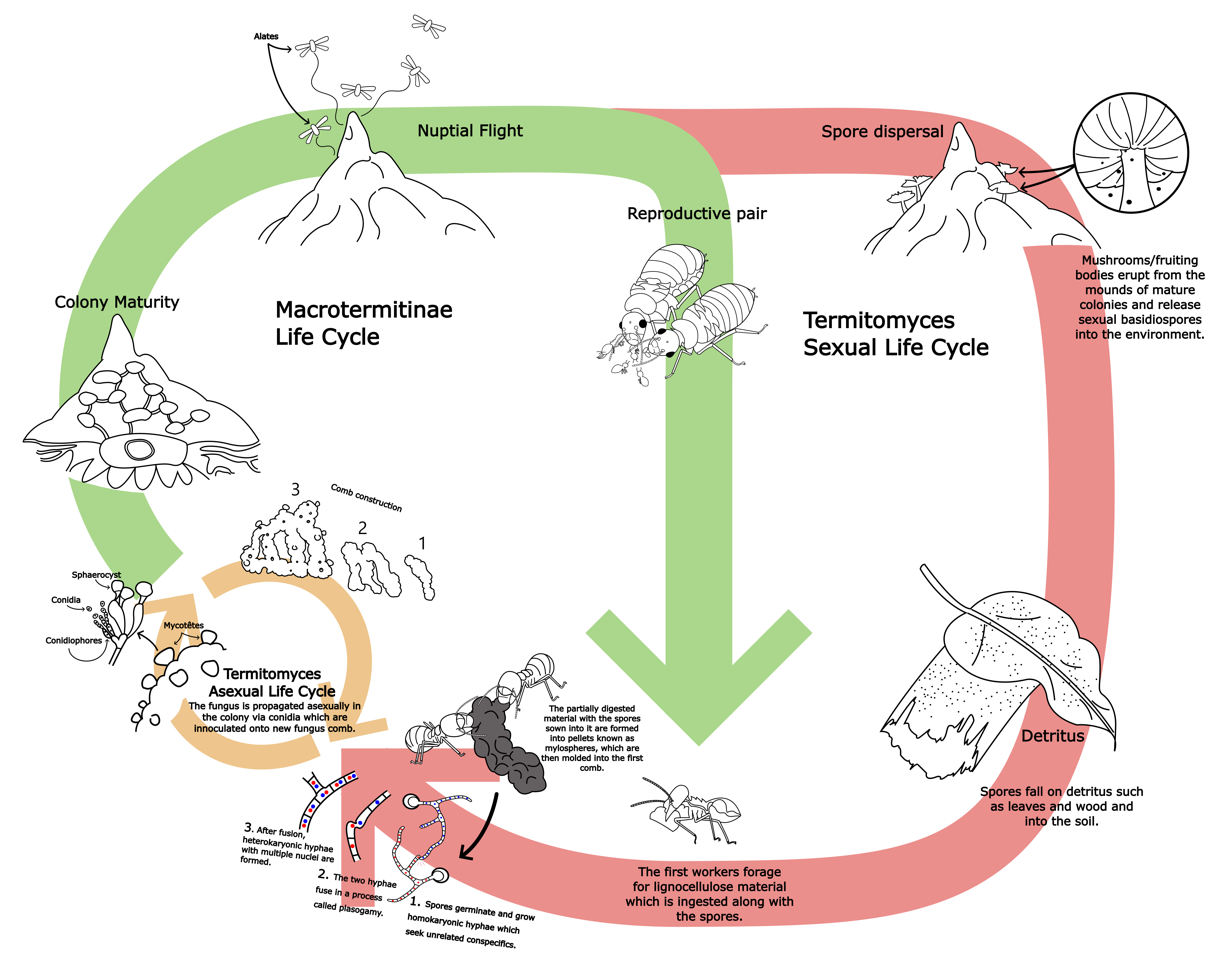
General life cycle of Macrotermitinae

Shortly after a nuptial flight, the fully claustral male and female pairs set off to immediately find a safe location to found a new colony, and unlike their xylophagous relatives, instead sequester themselves within the native sand-clay soils of their habitat. The eggs can take anywhere between 15 and 30 days to hatch into several dozen nymphs, which later differentiate and mature into the first workers and soldiers.

Similarly to Attini fungus-growing ants, the life cycle of these termites is intimately tied to that of their symbiote. Macrotermes, like the majority of Macrotermitinae, primarily practice the horizontal mode of transmission of their obligate symbiotic fungi, with the sole exception of Macrotermes bellicosus which practices vertical transmission of their symbiote; i.e., the reproductives carry fungus material within their crop to start new fungus gardens, as opposed to the mode of horizontal transmission where the spores of their Termitomyces symbiote must be foraged for in the environment.

A couple months after nuptial flights, mature colonies of species that practice the horizontal mode of transmission have mushrooms erupt from the surface of their nests. These mushrooms release spores into the environment which is timed to when the first workers of young colonies have begun foraging. Workers pick up these spores while foraging and ingest the spores incidentally while consuming detritus consisting of dead woods, grasses and leaves at varying stages of decomposition. The guts of the termites work to act as sterilization stations so that nothing but the Termitomyces spores survive. The spores are later defecated along with the partially digested lignocellulose material which is molded into the primordial fungus comb; a brown pillar-like structure. The spores germinate soon after and grow to cover the primordial comb, appearing as a smooth layer of silky white, tightly interwoven mycelium. As it digests the cellulose and matures, the fungus grows white nodules on the surface of the comb – which is what the termites eat directly. As the fungus exhausts the substrate in the comb, new substrate is added and the old substrate is then also eaten by the termites.

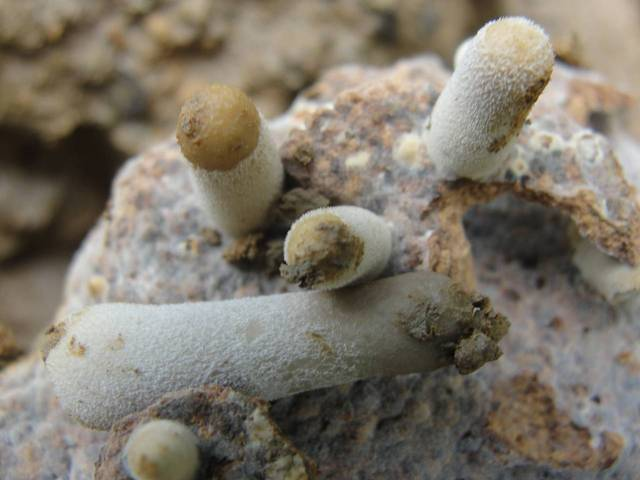
Termitomyces heimii with growing mycelium and primordia on comb

== Relationship with humans ==
Macrotermes termites are economically important pests that damage crop plants, rangelands, wooden structures and books. They may cause yield losses of up to 100%.

One study of wooden utility poles in Nigeria found that over two-thirds were infested by M. bellicosus. The termites visibly eroded the poles' base and structural strength, causing 53% of infested poles to tilt.

Some species of Macrotermes are eaten by humans in Africa. Alates are eaten the most, but workers and soldiers are also eaten and they are available throughout the year, unlike alates. One method of gathering them is to pour water over dry termite mounds in winter, mimicking the spring rains when termites are more active. In the South African province of Limpopo, Macrotermes soldiers and workers often occur in yards in rural areas, and on sidewalks in towns.

In Kenya, Macrotermes alates are sold commercially for retail prices comparable to that of goat meat. Trade of termites is dominated by women and involves collectors who sell to wholesalers, who then sell to retailers. The termites are typically preserved by drying, less commonly by frying. They are ground into flour for use in baking.

== Species ==
The following species are included:

1. Macrotermes acrocephalus Ping, 1985
2. Macrotermes ahmadi Tho, 1975
3. Macrotermes aleemi Akhtar, 1975
4. Macrotermes amplus (Sjöstedt, 1899)
5. Macrotermes annandalei (Silvestri, 1914)
6. Macrotermes barneyi Light, 1924
7. Macrotermes beaufortensis Thapa, 1982
8. Macrotermes bellicosus (Smeathman, 1781)
9. Macrotermes carbonarius (Hagen, 1858)
10. Macrotermes chaiglomi Ahmad, 1965
11. Macrotermes chebalingensis Ping & Xu, 1993
12. Macrotermes choui Ping, 1985
13. Macrotermes constrictus Ping & Li, 1985
14. Macrotermes convulsionarius (König, 1779)
15. Macrotermes declivatus Zhu, 1995
16. Macrotermes denticulatus Li & Ping, 1983
17. Macrotermes falciger (Gerstäecker, 1891)
18. Macrotermes gilvus (Hagen, 1858)
19. Macrotermes gratus (Sjöstedt, 1900)
20. Macrotermes guangxiensis Han, 1986
21. Macrotermes hainanensis Li & Ping, 1983
22. Macrotermes herus (Sjöstedt, 1914)
23. Macrotermes hopini Roonwal & Sen-Sarma, 1956
24. Macrotermes incisus He & Qiu, 1990
25. Macrotermes ituriensis Sjöstedt, 1924
26. Macrotermes ivorensis Grassé & Noirot, 1951
27. Macrotermes jeanneli
28. Macrotermes jinghongensis Ping & Li, 1985
29. Macrotermes khajuriai Roonwal & Chhotani, 1962
30. Macrotermes latignathus Thapa, 1982
31. Macrotermes lilljeborgi (Sjöstedt, 1896)
32. Macrotermes longiceps Li & Ping, 1983
33. Macrotermes longimentis Zhu & Luo, 1987
34. Macrotermes luokengensis Lin & Shi, 1982
35. Macrotermes maesodensis Ahmad, 1965
36. Macrotermes malaccensis (Haviland, 1898)
37. Macrotermes meidoensis Huang & Han, 1988
38. Macrotermes menglongensis Han, 1986
39. Macrotermes michaelseni (Sjöstedt, 1914)
40. Macrotermes muelleri (Sjöstedt)
41. Macrotermes natalensis (Haviland, 1898)
42. Macrotermes niger (Sjöstedt, 1898)
43. Macrotermes nobilis (Sjöstedt, 1900)
44. Macrotermes orthognathus Ping & Xu, 1985
45. Macrotermes peritrimorphus Li & Xiao, 1989
46. Macrotermes planicapitatus Gao & Lau, 1996
47. †Macrotermes pristinus (Charpentier, 1843)
48. Macrotermes probeaufortensis Thapa, 1982
49. Macrotermes renouxi Rouland, 1993
50. †Macrotermes scheuthlei (Armbruster, 1941)
51. Macrotermes serrulatus Snyder, 1934
52. Macrotermes singaporensis (Oshima, 1913)
53. Macrotermes subhyalinus (Rambur, 1842)
54. Macrotermes trapezoides Ping & Xu, 1985
55. Macrotermes trimorphus Li & Ping, 1983
56. Macrotermes ukuzii Fuller, 1922
57. Macrotermes vitrialatus (Sjöstedt, 1899)
58. Macrotermes yunnanensis Han, 1986
59. Macrotermes zhejiangensis Ping & Dong, 1994
60. Macrotermes zhui Krishna, 2013

== Gallery ==
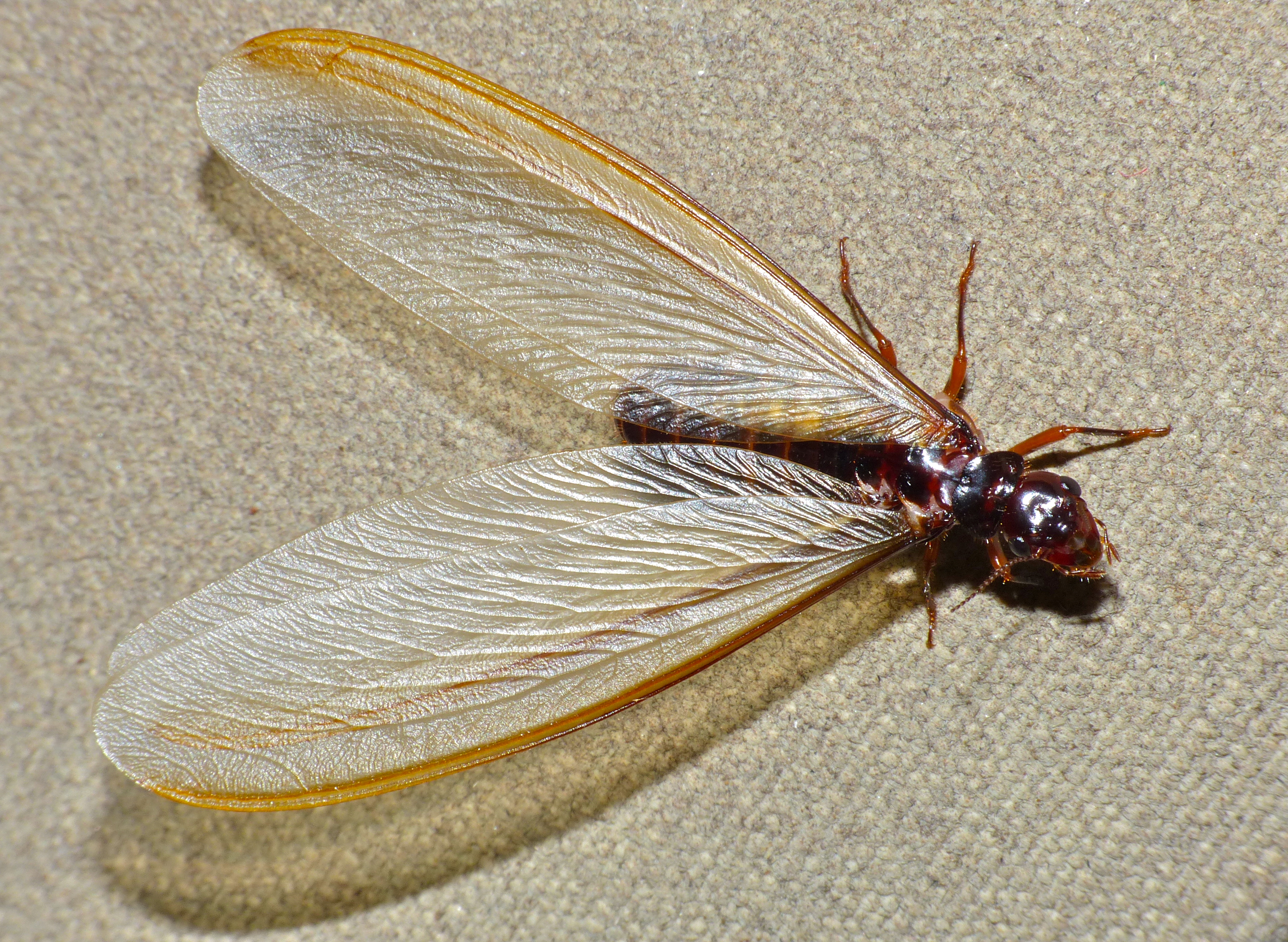
alate

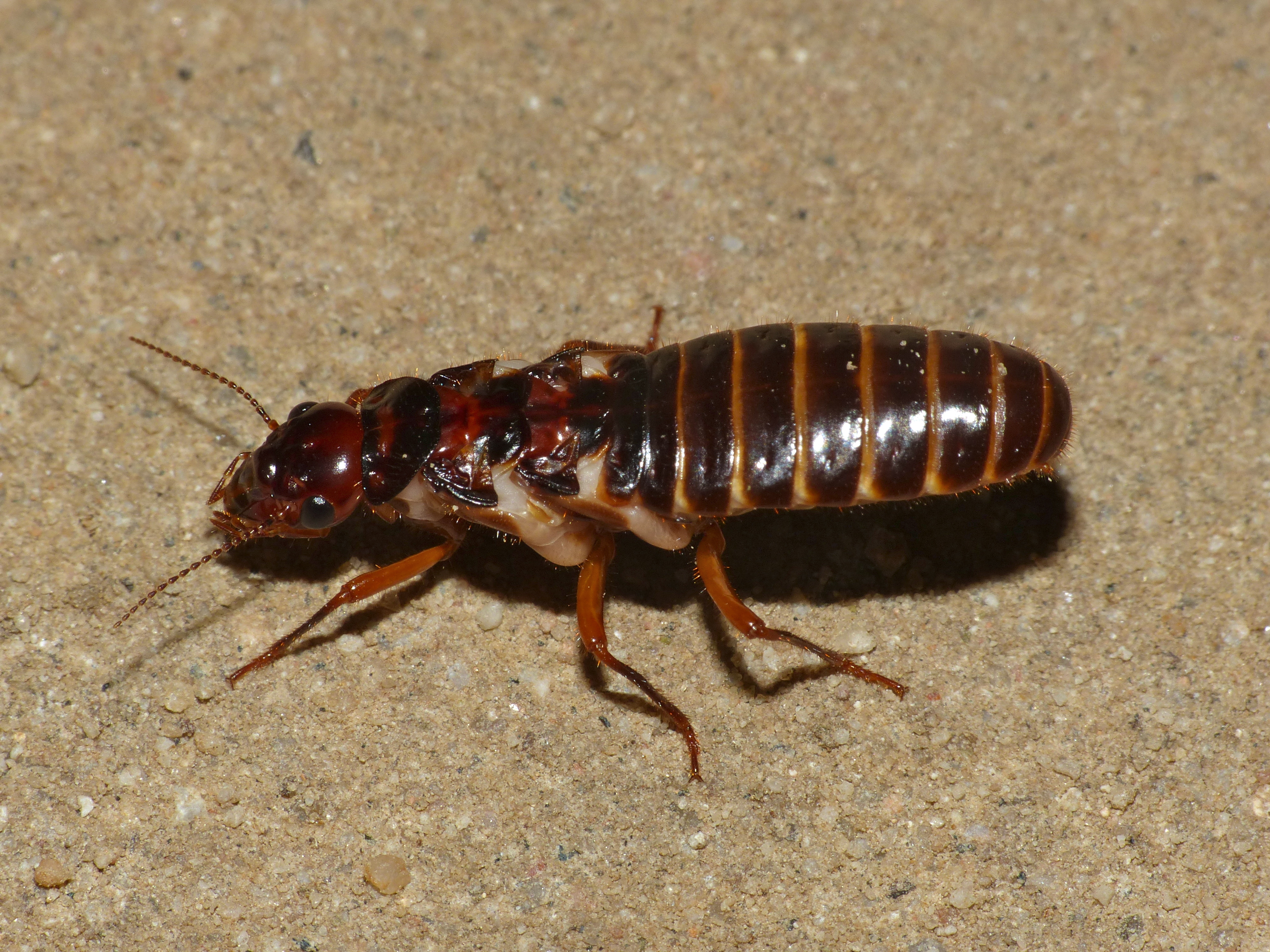
de-alate

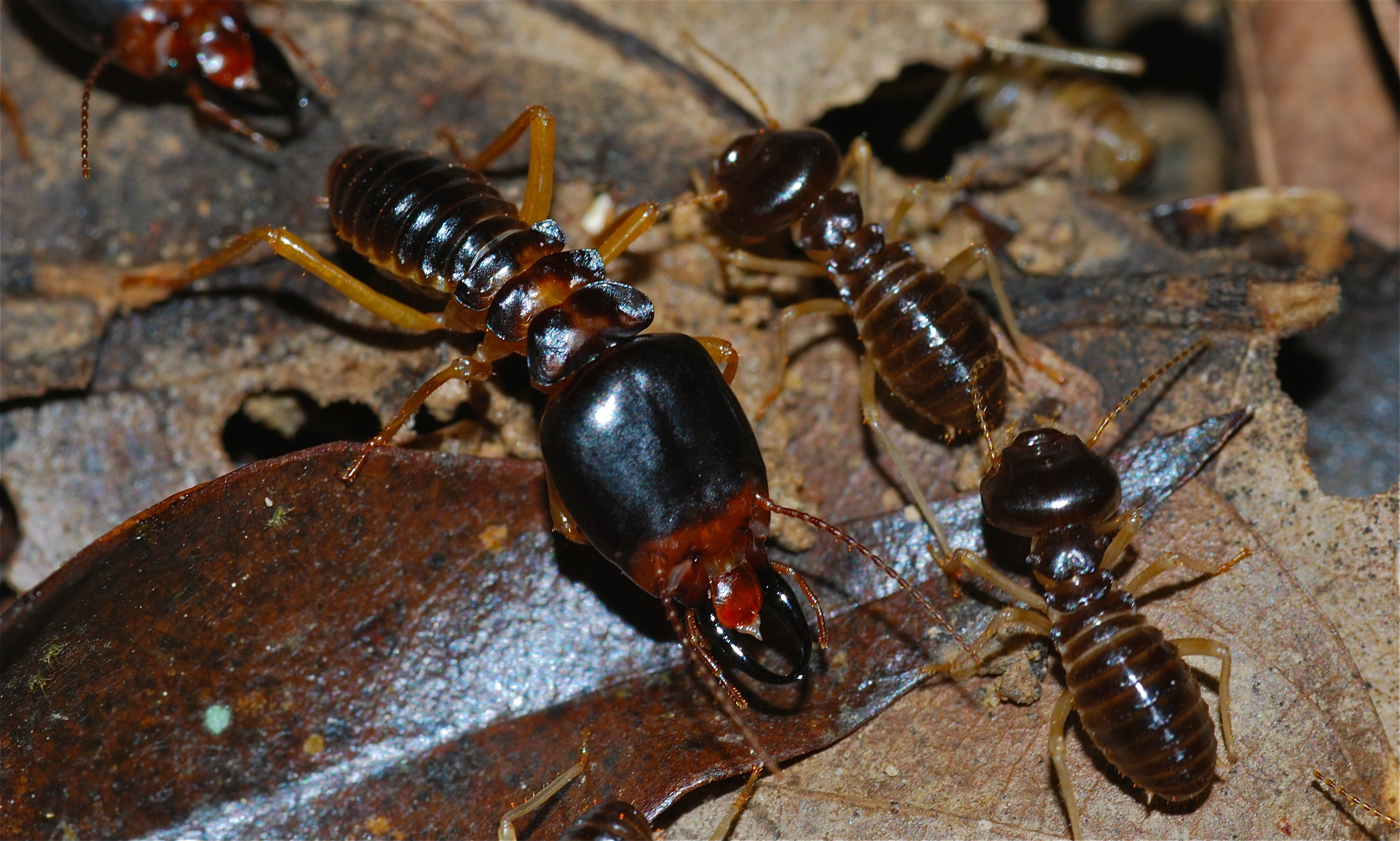
soldier and workers

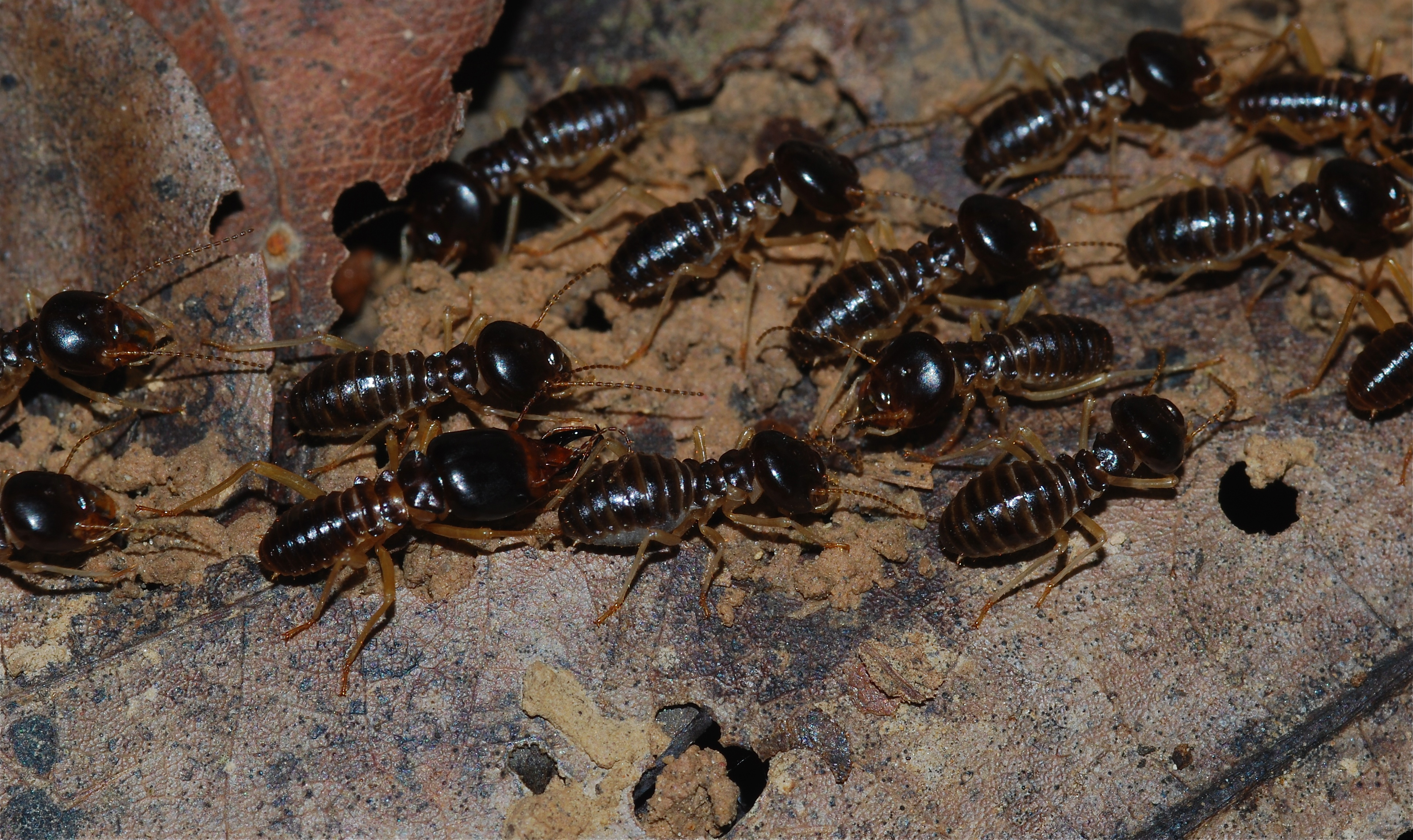
workers
