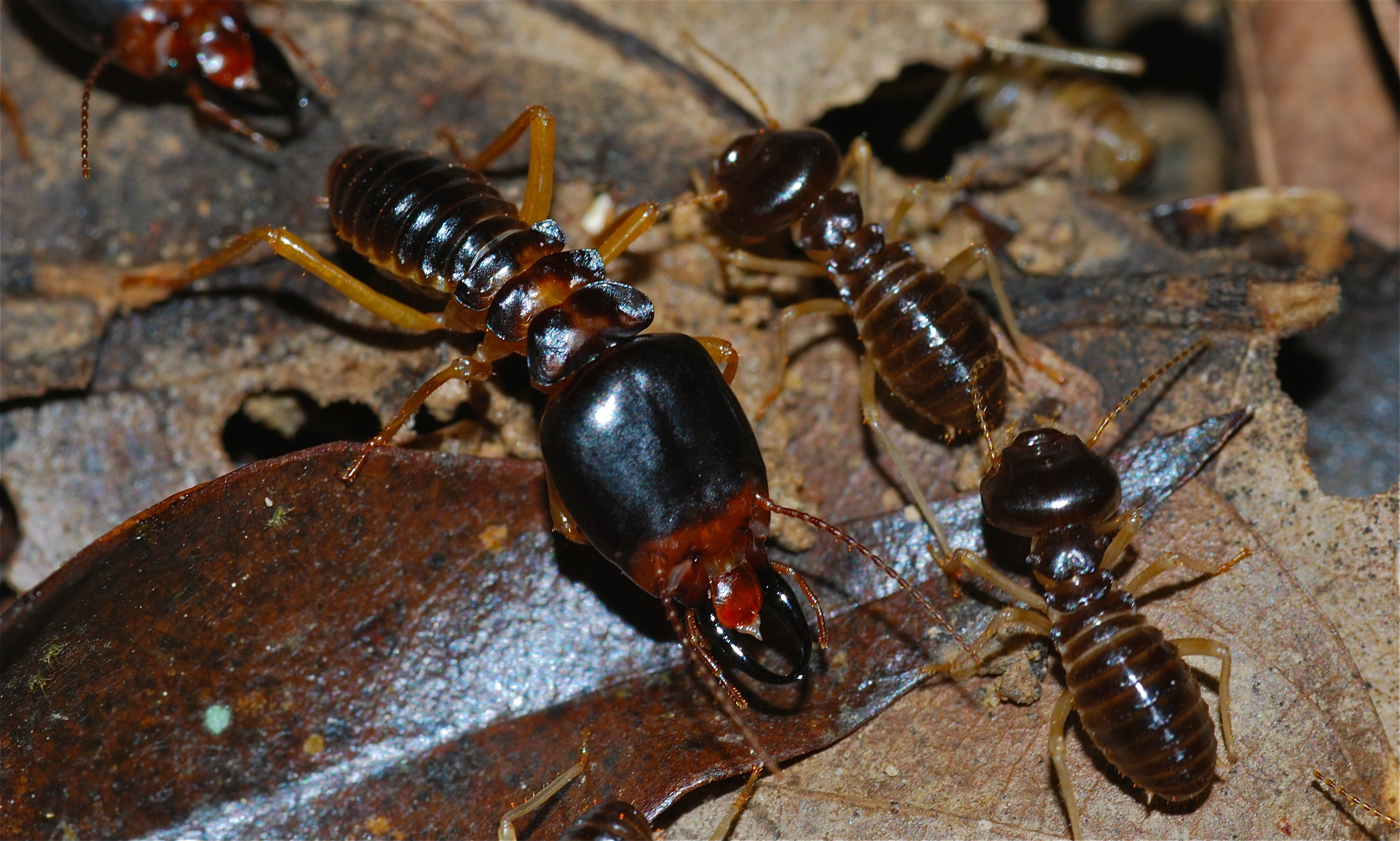
- Soldiers and workers

Scientific classification
- Kingdom: Animalia
- Phylum: Arthropoda
- Clade: Pancrustacea
- Class: Insecta
- Order: Blattodea
- Infraorder: Isoptera
- Family: Termitidae
- Genus: Macrotermes
- Species: M. carbonarius

Binomial name
- Macrotermes carbonarius (Hagen, 1858)

Synonyms
- Termes (Termes) carbonarius Hagen, 1858

= Macrotermes carbonarius =

Species of termite

Macrotermes carbonarius, also known as Kongkiak in Malay, is a large black species of fungus-growing termite in the genus Macrotermes. It is one of the most conspicuous species of Macrotermes found in the Indomalayan tropics, forming large foraging trails in the open that can extend several metres in distance. M. carbonarius is a highly aggressive species with the soldiers possessing large curving mandibles that easily break skin. It is found in Cambodia, Malaysia, Myanmar, Singapore, Thailand and Vietnam.

== Identification ==
Soldiers, workers, and imagoes of the species Macrotermes carbonarius are easily distinguished from other species in its range due to the almost jet-black coloration of the exoskeletons.

Like other Macrotermes species, M. carbonarius has dimorphic worker and soldier castes, with the largest soldiers commonly reaching lengths of 16 mm.

The imagoes can closely resemble the imagoes of some species of Odontotermes. They can, however, be distinguished by the proportionally smaller eyes and overall larger size of M. carbonarius imagoes, which can attain a body length of 15 – 16 mm. The primary distinction is in the forewings as, unlike in Odontotermes where the median and cubitus veins converge, they remain separate in Macrotermes.

== Biology ==
M. carbonarius is confined to elevations below 160 metres and primarily inhabits the tropical to subtropical lowland forests of Southeast Asia. It can be found across a wide variety of forested flat lands, most commonly in dipterocarp and coastal forests as well as rural areas and plantations.

The nests are large and conspicuous, broad and irregular in shape. No obvious ventilation system exists within the mound walls. The walls of the mound are thick and compact, varying 11–18 in width, and the height of the mound ranges from 30 to 48 cm. Majority of the colony and the fungus gardens reside either just slightly below or above ground level or sometimes entirely within the mound itself.

This species displays complex defensive behaviors when a breach of the mound occurs. In shallow breaches, a few minor and major soldiers rush out to face any threats while the workers retreat deeper into the nest, a normal behavior common to other Macrotermes species. However, in the event of a deep breach, the soldiers assume a defensive phalanx formation around the perimeter of the breach and begin hammering their heads against the walls of the mound in synchrony, creating a rhythmic rattling noise. It is speculated this behavior evolved as a warning to predatory vertebrates. The curving mandibles of the soldiers make them difficult to pry off the skin, with bites commonly occurring when people accidentally step onto the foraging trails. Bites from this species are considered painful and commonly draw blood. The soldiers also possess a defensive fluid produced from the salivary glands which is composed of lauric acid methyl ester, quinones and three other unknown compounds. The defensive fluid is believed to be primarily insecticidal via action of the lauric acid, and is thought to aid against predation by ants.

M. carbonarius is amongst the most free-ranging of Macrotermes species found in the indomalayan tropics. It forages above the ground from numerous large subterranean tunnels that can extend between 33.8 – 112.8 metres from the nest before emerging onto the surface. Foraging trails may also then extend several metres onto the surface and can be readily recognized by the positioning of a large number of major and minor soldiers at the flanks. The trails are paved with soil pellets around the exit holes for some distance, and most notably exhibit a trunk structure with branching forays upstream. Workers primarily forage for leaf litter which constitutes the principal diet of this species, although they will readily take decaying wood when available. Other sources such as palm fronds or dried blades of grass are also occasionally taken. These termites are more tolerant of desiccation due to their more sclerotized exoskeleton, which enables them to forage for longer periods in conditions that other sympatric Macrotermes species would find intolerable. They are primarily active during the night and twilight hours with foraging activity continuing longer in the day in more favorable weather such as humid and overcast conditions.

The fungus comb of this species is notably less complex than that of its relatives, with a less defined airy grooved structure common to other Macrotermitinae. The termites, rather than continuously build upon old fungus comb as it is gradually eaten, instead consume the entire comb once it has been completed and matured. After being fully consumed, a new fungus comb is constructed in its place.

== Reproduction ==
Nuptial flights occur during daylight in the late afternoon, usually around dusk. Windless, hot and dry conditions in the absence of rain following a day of heavy rain is preferred.

Horizontally elongated openings known as flight holes are constructed and opened around midday. If favorable conditions persist up to the late afternoon, massive nuptial flights consisting of hundreds or thousands alates are released by colonies. Flights are short in duration and last around 4–10 minutes. Flights occur as early as mid October, peaking in November, with smaller sporadic flights occurring from December to January.
