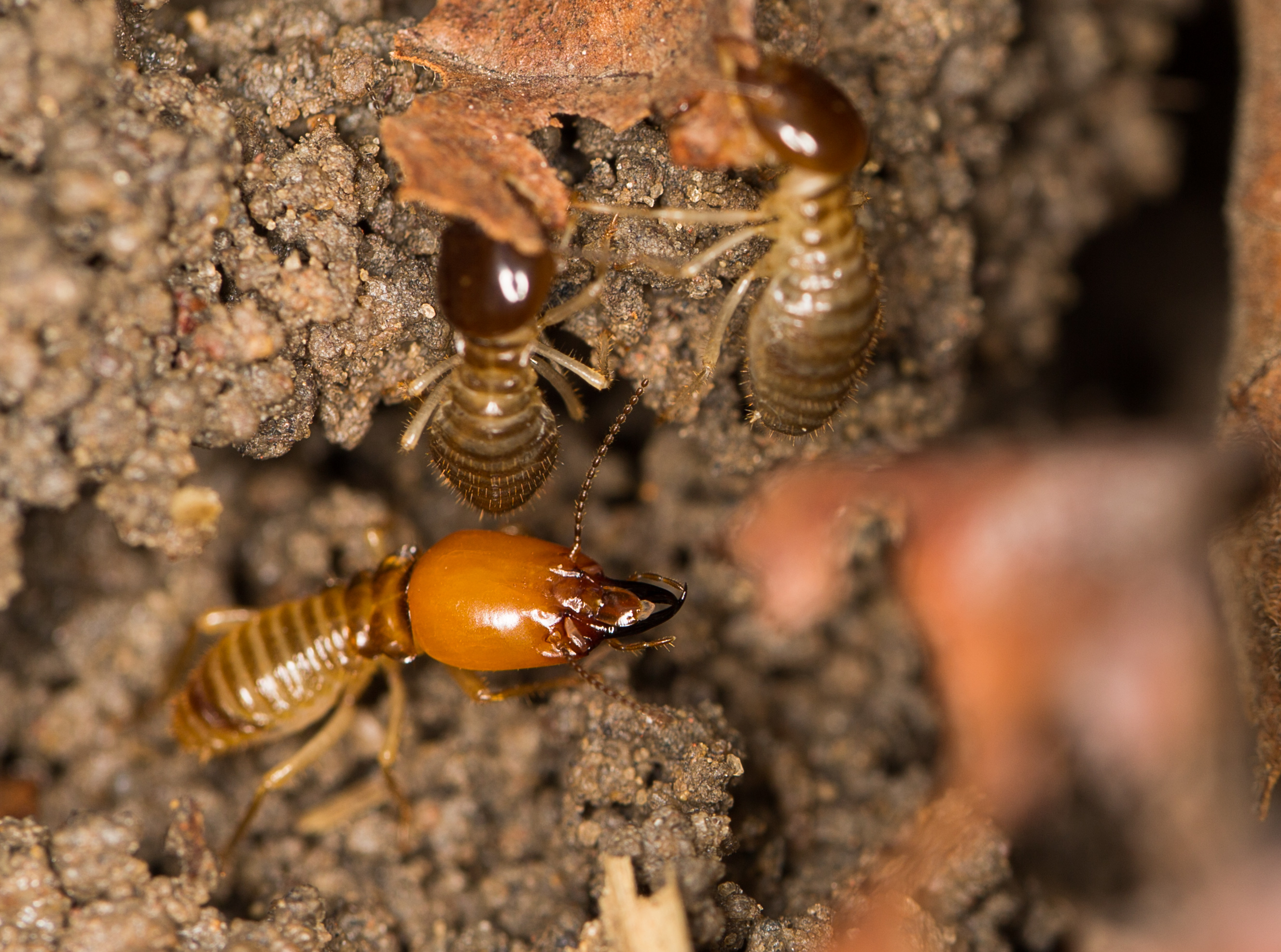
- Minor soldier and major workers

Scientific classification
- Kingdom: Animalia
- Phylum: Arthropoda
- Clade: Pancrustacea
- Class: Insecta
- Order: Blattodea
- Infraorder: Isoptera
- Family: Termitidae
- Genus: Macrotermes
- Species: M. bellicosus

Binomial name
- Macrotermes bellicosus (Smeathman, 1781)

= Macrotermes bellicosus =

Species of insect

Macrotermes bellicosus is a species of Macrotermes. The queens are the largest amongst known termites, measuring about 4.2 inches (110 mm) long when physogastric. The workers average 0.14 in (3.6 mm) in length and soldiers are slightly larger. Bellicosus means "combative" in Latin. The species is a member of a genus indigenous to Africa and South-East Asia.

== Behavior ==
=== Caste polyethism ===
There are two worker castes in M. bellicosus, the major worker and the minor worker. In both cases, the workers begin their lives by taking care of the queen, and later on leave the nest to begin foraging. The point at which the worker leaves the nest to begin gathering food differs slightly between the two castes. Major workers will leave at any point between 13 and 25 days after moulting, and the minor worker exits between 9 and 32 days.

Activities of M. bellicosus that go on outside the nest, which mainly consist of exploration and food gathering, show a division of labor between the two worker castes. The exploration phase, where underground passages are built radiating outward from the nest, is mainly attributed to the minor workers, and major worker activity is low during this period. Once food is discovered, however, there is a shift in this division of labor and the major workers will then be the main caste that is charged with gathering the food. Recruitment of new minor workers during this period is low, and those minor workers that have already been recruited will continue to construct passages near the food. This division of labor normally favors a major to minor worker ratio where minor workers are in much higher numbers until food is discovered, at which point the ratio will continually lean towards increasing numbers of major workers.

Two different feeding groups were established in M. bellicosus based on examining the gut contents of workers in foraging sites, the fungus comb and queen cell. These two groups differed in abdomen coloration, with the majority of workers having a dark brown abdomen that was correlated with feeding on the fungus comb, and a smaller amount having a reddish-brown abdomen caused by feeding on plant litter. There is a division of food intake between the major and minor workers, based on the fact that most of the termites with reddish-brown abdomens, caused by consuming plant litter, were major workers. Because the fungus comb is built with the feces of consumed plant litter, major workers are dominant in fungus comb construction and are also the dominant worker caste for food processing.

==== Caste-specific pheromones ====
The division of labor between minor and major workers also causes there to be a difference in the pheromone trails that each type of caste will leave. Trails that are left by minor workers, which can contain information about the presence of food based on the existence of certain pheromones, will attract both types of castes. The food information in these trails is only detected by major workers, who will orient themselves toward the food, while minor workers will follow all trails regardless of food information. Through this system, major workers will usually be traveling towards food, while minor workers will be exploring new territory. These minor worker trails have been shown to be generally more attractive than trails left by a mixed population of major and minor workers, indicating that the major workers may leave a trail that is antagonistic to the minor worker trail. This could be a mechanism for dividing major worker labor between various food sources by causing trails that are already being followed by major workers to be less attractive.

==== Intraspecific colony recognition ====
M. bellicosus individuals showed different types of intraspecific colony recognition behavior depending on caste. Minor soldiers would typically act aggressive, while major workers showed no aggression but instead would exhibit varying degrees of examination behavior. The variation of this behavior could not be correlated to mound size, age or spatial difference between colonies, indicating that there was no type of dear enemy effect. These behaviors were consistent with their colonies over long periods of time.

=== Environmental influence on behavior ===
==== Mound construction ====
M. bellicosus will construct mounds differently based on the surrounding habitat, as seen in observations made in Comoé National Park. In the forest, the mounds are constructed with thick walls and are dome shaped, whereas the mounds that are constructed in the savanna have thin walls and deviate from the simple dome construction to more complicated structures. Heating experiments demonstrated that this difference in structure is due to different thermal properties of each mound as a response to the unique habitats. Mounds in the cooler forest habitat will retain their temperature for longer periods of time while mounds in the warmer savanna will shed heat faster. M. bellicosus individuals will burrow themselves in the subsoil and collect clay in their mouths. The clay is moistened by their saliva. Mound building is usually most labor-intensive in the wet months.

==== Predation risk ====
Pressures from predation play a role in the foraging behavior of M. bellicosus, which will vary between the two types of environments. This was measured by observing when the termites will stop foraging in an area while varying the pressure from predators. In the savanna, there was gradual increase in the amount of unused food remaining in response to increasing predation, while in contrast food was immediately abandoned in response to any predation in the forest. Also, in the absence of predation, less food was left not utilized in the savanna, indicating that a higher value is placed on food in this particular habitat. These observations are in accordance with the higher availability of food in the forest in comparison to the savanna.

==== Lifetime reproductive success ====
Examining the reproductive outputs of the two types of M. bellicosus habitats showed that the colonies in the savanna reproduced more frequently than the forest colonies, and also produce higher numbers of offspring. Likewise, the growth rates of the colony mounds, which can be correlated with the overall growth rates of the colonies, are also higher in the savanna mounds. Despite the higher availability of food in the forest habitat, and lower probability of survival in the savanna, the lifetime reproductive success of the colonies in the savanna were estimated to be much higher than those in the forest.

==== Interspecific competition ====
Foraging activities of M. bellicosus and other detritivorous termites are at a peak during the rainy season. It was observed that in the savanna, where even during the rainy season the availability of food is limited, the other termites exhibit complementary foraging in response to M. bellicosus, where they were more active in the absence of this dominant detritivore. This behavior indicates that there may be interspecific competition occurring between termites for available resources.

== See also ==
- List of largest insects
