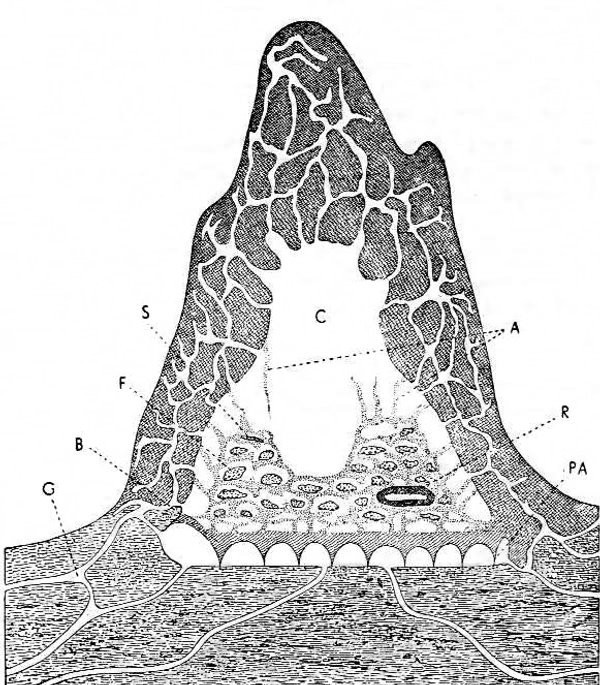
- Cross-section of mound

Scientific classification
- Kingdom: Animalia
- Phylum: Arthropoda
- Clade: Pancrustacea
- Class: Insecta
- Order: Blattodea
- Infraorder: Isoptera
- Family: Termitidae
- Genus: Macrotermes
- Species: M. natalensis

Binomial name
- Macrotermes natalensis (Haviland, 1898)

= Macrotermes natalensis =

Species of termite

Macrotermes natalensis is a fungus-growing termite species of South Africa that belongs to the genus Macrotermes. This species is associated with the Termitomyces fungal genus. M. natalensis has domesticated Termitomyces to produce food for the colony. Both termite species- fungal genus- are obligate and mutually beneficial where termite relies on the fungus to break down for plant materiel and nutrient resource. In contrast, the fungal species obtain plant material and optimal conditions for growth.

M. natalensis has become a well-studied fungus-growing termite species, and its 1.3 gigabase pair genome was one of the largest sequenced insect genomes as of 2014.

== Colony caste system ==
All the fungus-growing termite colonies are similar caste systems. Each caste plays a different role in the colony, but it is not yet known how caste selection occurs. The primary reproductive caste or royal pair is made up of a king and a queen. The winged alates make up the secondary reproductive caste. Sterile castes do not possess any reproductive capacity and include workers and soldiers, both major and minor.

== Termitomyces in a colony ==
Termitomyces fungi play a major role in termite nutrition. They also influence termite survival and caste development. The fungal garden is managed by the worker caste.

In a mature M. natalensis colony, older workers collect dead plant material along with Termitomyces asexual spores from their habitat and pass these on to the younger workers. The young workers only stay in the nest. They receive the plant material and ingest it along with the Termitomyces spores. Later, young workers defecate this blended plant material, along with fungal spores, somewhere in the colony nest. It forms a "comb", where the fungal mycelium establishes a dense network. The Termitomyces fungi use the nutrients from the comb and complete their life cycle with fruiting bodies or fungal nodules.
