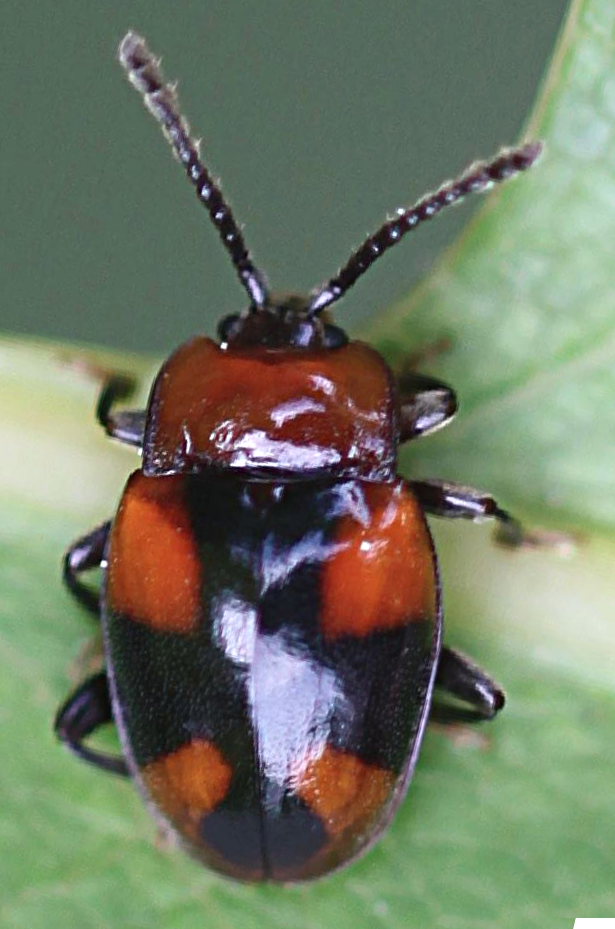

Scientific classification
- Domain: Eukaryota
- Kingdom: Animalia
- Phylum: Arthropoda
- Class: Insecta
- Order: Coleoptera
- Suborder: Polyphaga
- Infraorder: Cucujiformia
- Family: Endomychidae
- Genus: Mycetina
- Species: M. cruciata

Binomial name
- Mycetina cruciata (Schaller, 1783)

= Mycetina cruciata =

Species of beetle

Mycetina cruciata is a species of beetle belonging to the family Endomychidae. M. cruciata is native to Europe.

== Description ==
Mycetina cruciata beetles measure between 3.8 and 4.5 millimeters in length. Their antennae and legs are black, while the thorax (pronotum) and wing covers (elytra) range from orange to red in color. The beetle gets its name from a black cross-shaped pattern on its wing covers (see Fig. 1 on the right). Often, the crossbar of the cross is broken, and the beetle appears black along the suture with a black spot on each wing cover.

The antennae are segmented, with the 9th antennal segment being conical in shape. The last two segments (antennomeres) are the widest. In male beetles, there is an additional 6th ventral segment.

Other beetles also exhibit similar coloring and cross markings. These include species from the family of fungus beetles (Mycetophagidae) such as the four-spotted fungus beetle (Mycetophagus quadripustulatus), which, however, has a reddish head and reddish legs. Mycetophagus quadriguttatus also belongs to this family and has reddish legs with a less distinct pattern on the elytra (wing covers).

From the family of darkling beetles (Tenebrionidae), the yellow-banded darkling beetle (Diaperis boleti) displays a black band on its yellow to dark orange elytra, although it is notably larger in size. In the same family as the cross-striped cabbage worm beetle, the handsome fungus beetle (Endomychus coccineus) showcases black markings in dot rather than cross formation.

The larvae also feed on fungi and are brown in color. The segmented back features lobe-like projections along the edges of the segments. Running from front to back, there is a light dorsal median stripe. These larvae resemble those of the fungus beetle Aphorista vittata, which, however, is found only in the United States.
