= Corynomalus elegans =

Scientific classification
- Kingdom: Animalia
- Phylum: Arthropoda
- Class: Insecta
- Order: Coleoptera
- Suborder: Polyphaga
- Infraorder: Cucujiformia
- Family: Endomychidae
- Genus: Corynomalus
- Species: C. elegans

Binomial name
- Corynomalus elegans Csiki, 1902

Species of beetle

Corynomalus elegans is a species of handsome fungus beetles in the subfamily Lycoperdininae. It is found in Ecuador.
