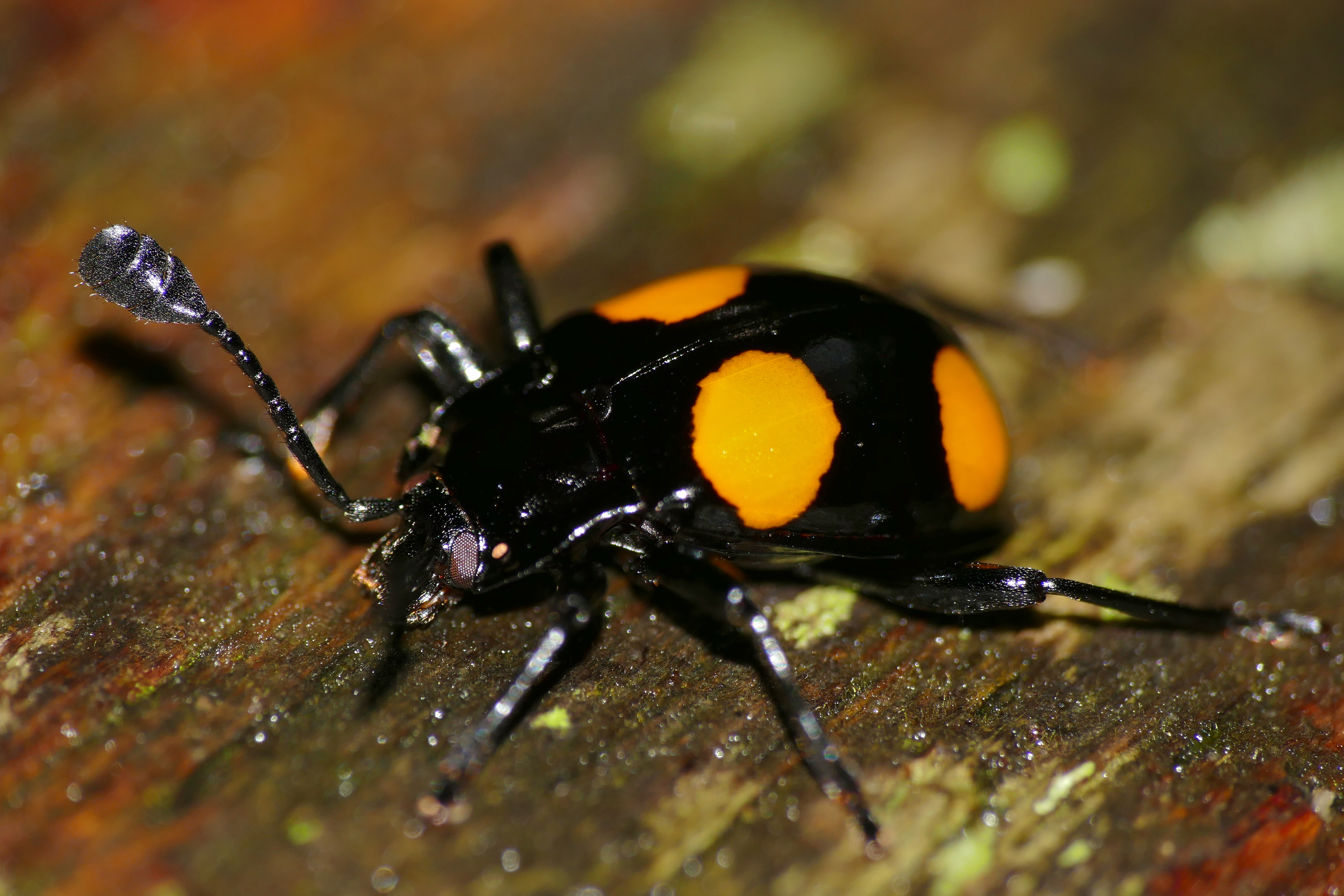
- Eumorphus westwoodi

Scientific classification
- Domain: Eukaryota
- Kingdom: Animalia
- Phylum: Arthropoda
- Class: Insecta
- Order: Coleoptera
- Suborder: Polyphaga
- Infraorder: Cucujiformia
- Family: Endomychidae
- Subfamily: Lycoperdininae
- Genus: Eumorphus; Weber, 1801

Synonyms
- Enaisimus Guérin-Ménéville, 1858; Eumorphoides Guérin-Ménéville, 1858; Haplomorphus Guérin-Ménéville, 1858; Heterandrus Guérin-Ménéville, 1858

= Eumorphus =

Genus of beetles

Eumorphus is a genus of beetles belonging to the family Endomychidae.

== Species ==
- Eumorphus alboguttatus Gerstaecker, 1857
- Eumorphus assamensis Gerstaecker, 1857
- Eumorphus austerus Gerstaecker, 1857
- Eumorphus bicoloripedoides (Mader, 1955)
- Eumorphus bipunctatus Perty, 1831
- Eumorphus bulbosus Schaufuss, 1887
- Eumorphus carinatus Gerstaecker, 1857
- Eumorphus coloratus Gerstaecker, 1857
- Eumorphus columbinus Gerstaecker, 1857
- Eumorphus constrictus Arrow, 1926
- Eumorphus costatus Gorham, 1873
- Eumorphus cryptus Strohecker, 1968
- Eumorphus csikii Strohecker, 1957
- Eumorphus cyanescens Gerstaecker, 1857
- Eumorphus dehaani Guérin-Ménéville, 1858
- Eumorphus depressus Arrow, 1925
- Eumorphus dilatatus Perty, 1831
- Eumorphus drescheri Strohecker, 1957
- Eumorphus eburatus Gerstaecker, 1857
- Eumorphus elegans Strohecker, 1968
- Eumorphus eurynotus Strohecker, 1968
- Eumorphus felix Arrow, 1920
- Eumorphus festivus Arrow, 1920
- Eumorphus fraternus Arrow, 1920
- Eumorphus fryanus Gorham, 1875
- Eumorphus helaeus Arrow, 1920
- Eumorphus hilaris Arrow, 1928
- Eumorphus inflatus Arrow, 1920
- Eumorphus insignis Gorham, 1901
- Eumorphus leptocerus Strohecker, 1968
- Eumorphus longespinosus Pic, 1930
- Eumorphus lucidus Gorham, 1892
- Eumorphus macrospilotus Arrow, 1920
- Eumorphus marginatus Fabricius, 1801
- Eumorphus micans Strohecker, 1968
- Eumorphus minor Gerstaecker, 1858
- Eumorphus murrayi Gorham, 1874
- Eumorphus ocellatus Arrow, 1920
- Eumorphus oculatus Gerstaecker, 1857
- Eumorphus panfilovi Kryzhanovskij, 1960
- Eumorphus parvus Strohecker, 1968
- Eumorphus politus Gerstaecker, 1857
- Eumorphus productus Arrow, 1920
- Eumorphus purpureus Strohecker, 1968
- Eumorphus quadriguttatus (Illiger, 1800)
- Eumorphus quadrinotatus Gerstaecker, 1857
- Eumorphus sanguinipes (Guérin-Ménéville, 1858)
- Eumorphus simplex Arrow, 1920
- Eumorphus staudingeri Mader, 1936
- Eumorphus subsinuatus Pic, 1927
- Eumorphus sybarita Gerstaecker, 1857
- Eumorphus tetraspilotus Hope, 1832
- Eumorphus trabeatus Arrow, 1925
- Eumorphus tumescens Gorham, 1892
- Eumorphus wegneri Strohecker, 1956
- Eumorphus westwoodi (Guérin-Ménéville, 1858)
