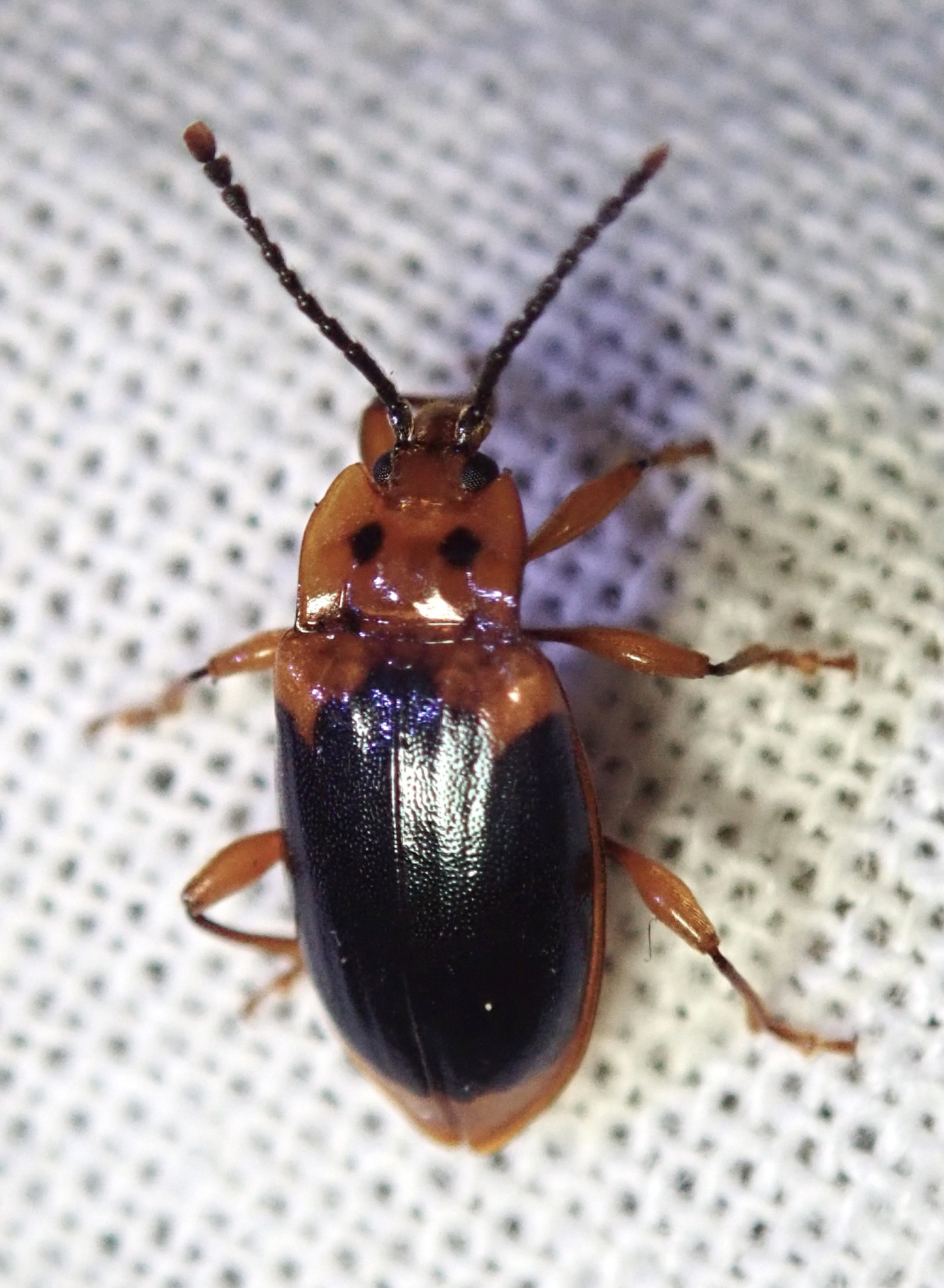
- Aphorista laeta

Scientific classification
- Kingdom: Animalia
- Phylum: Arthropoda
- Class: Insecta
- Order: Coleoptera
- Suborder: Polyphaga
- Infraorder: Cucujiformia
- Family: Endomychidae
- Subfamily: Lycoperdininae
- Genus: Aphorista; Gorham, 1873

= Aphorista =

Genus of beetles

Aphorista is a genus of handsome fungus beetles in the family Endomychidae. There are at least four described species within the genus Aphorista.

== Species ==
The following four species are classified under the genus Aphorista:

- Aphorista laeta (LeConte, 1854)
- Aphorista morosa (LeConte, 1859)
- Aphorista ovipennis Casey
- Aphorista vittata (Fabricius, 1787)
