= Cymbachus =

Scientific classification
- Kingdom: Animalia
- Phylum: Arthropoda
- Clade: Pancrustacea
- Class: Insecta
- Order: Coleoptera
- Suborder: Polyphaga
- Infraorder: Cucujiformia
- Family: Endomychidae
- Subfamily: Lycoperdininae
- Genus: Cymbachus; Gerstaecker, 1857

Species
- See text

Genus of beetles

Cymbachus is a genus of beetles in the sub-family Lycoperdininae of the handsome fungus beetles (Endomychidae).

Species in this genus are:

- Cymbachus elegans Arrow, 1920
- Cymbachus formosus Gorham, 1897
- Cymbachus koreanus Chûjô, Chûjô & Lee, 1993
- Cymbachus pulchellus Gerstaecker, 1857
- Cymbachus spilotus Arrow, 1925

Some other beetles formerly placed here are now in Sinocymbachus.
