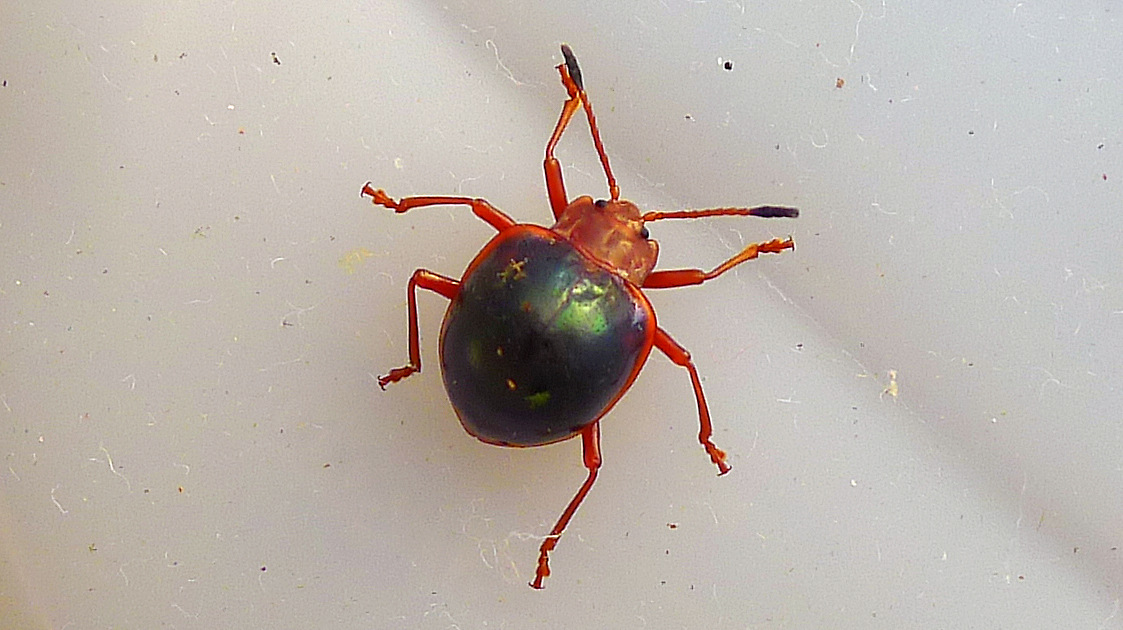
- Corynomalus sp., Atlantic forest, northeastern Bahia, Brazil

Scientific classification
- Kingdom: Animalia
- Phylum: Arthropoda
- Class: Insecta
- Order: Coleoptera
- Suborder: Polyphaga
- Infraorder: Cucujiformia
- Family: Endomychidae
- Subfamily: Lycoperdininae
- Genus: Corynomalus; Chevrolat in Dejean, 1836

Species
- Corynomalus elegans; Corynomalus laevigatus; Corynomalus perforatus; Corynomalus tarsatus; Corynomalus vestitus

Synonyms
- Amphix Castelnau de Laporte, 1840; Ampyx Agassiz 1846; Brachyampyx

= Corynomalus =

Genus of beetles

Corynomalus is a genus of handsome fungus beetles in the subfamily Lycoperdininae.
