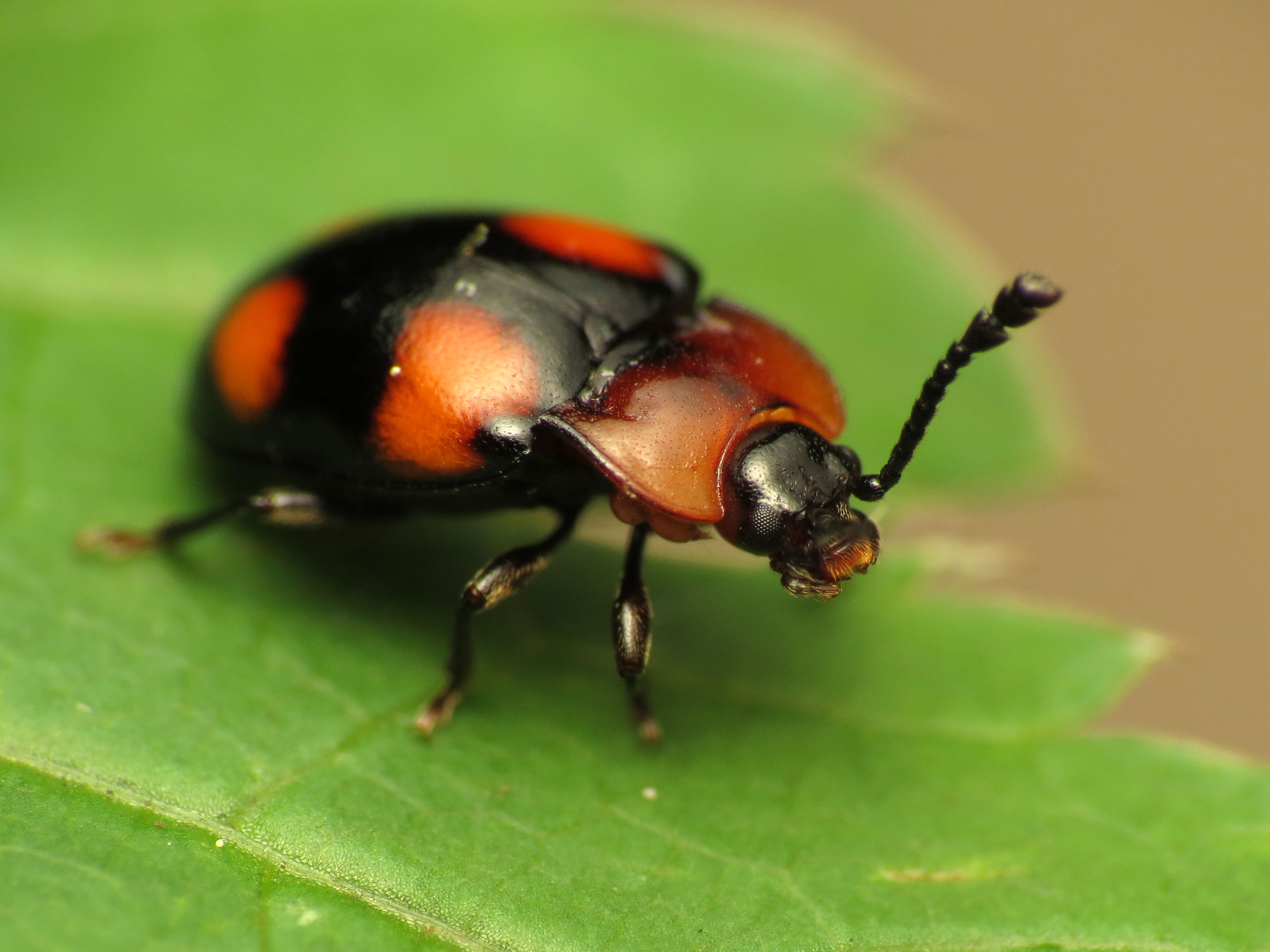

Scientific classification
- Kingdom: Animalia
- Phylum: Arthropoda
- Clade: Pancrustacea
- Class: Insecta
- Order: Coleoptera
- Suborder: Polyphaga
- Infraorder: Cucujiformia
- Family: Endomychidae
- Genus: Mycetina
- Species: M. perpulchra

Binomial name
- Mycetina perpulchra (Newman, 1838)

= Mycetina perpulchra =

Species of beetle

Mycetina perpulchra is a species of handsome fungus beetle in the family Endomychidae. It is found in North America.
