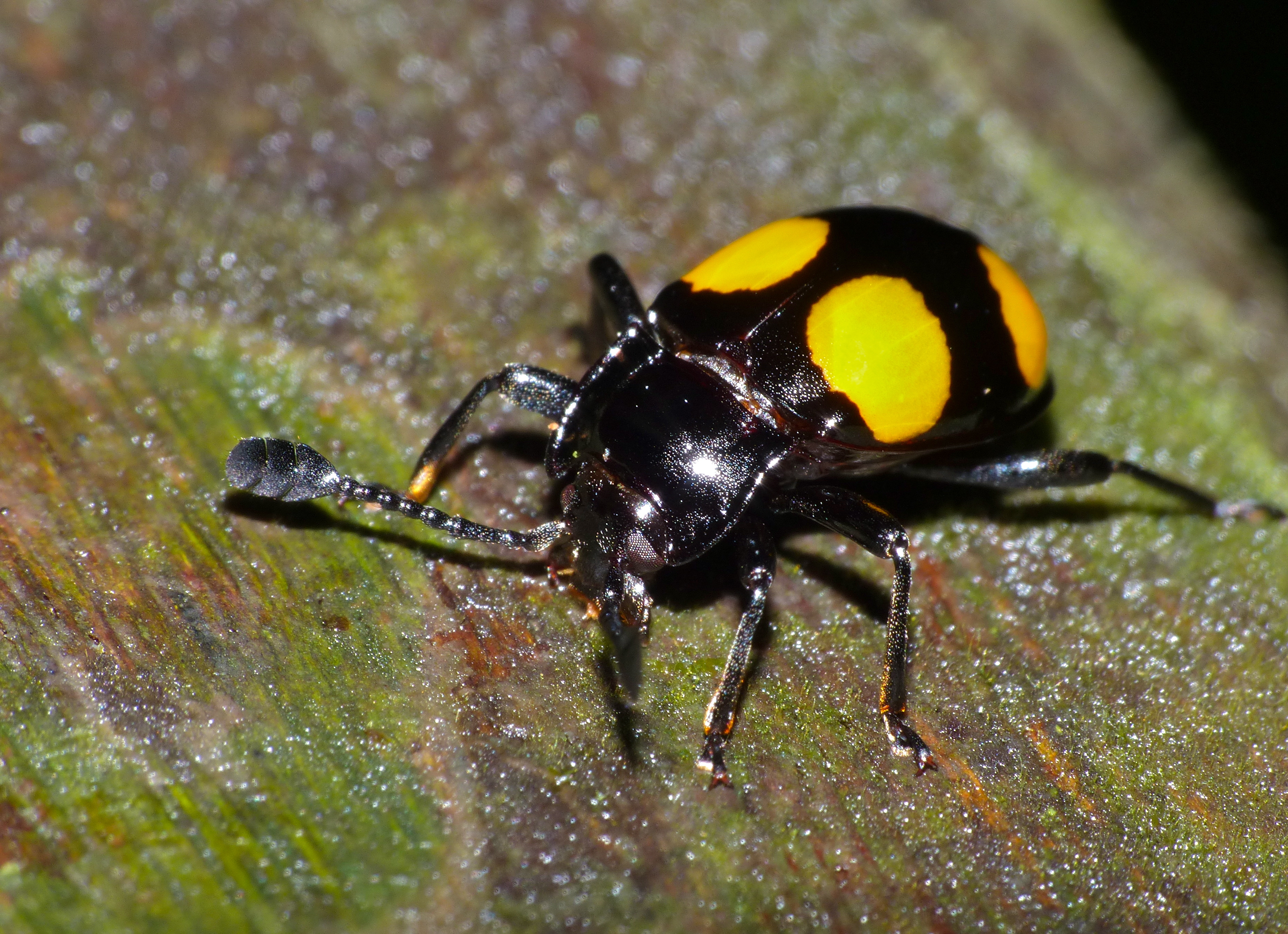

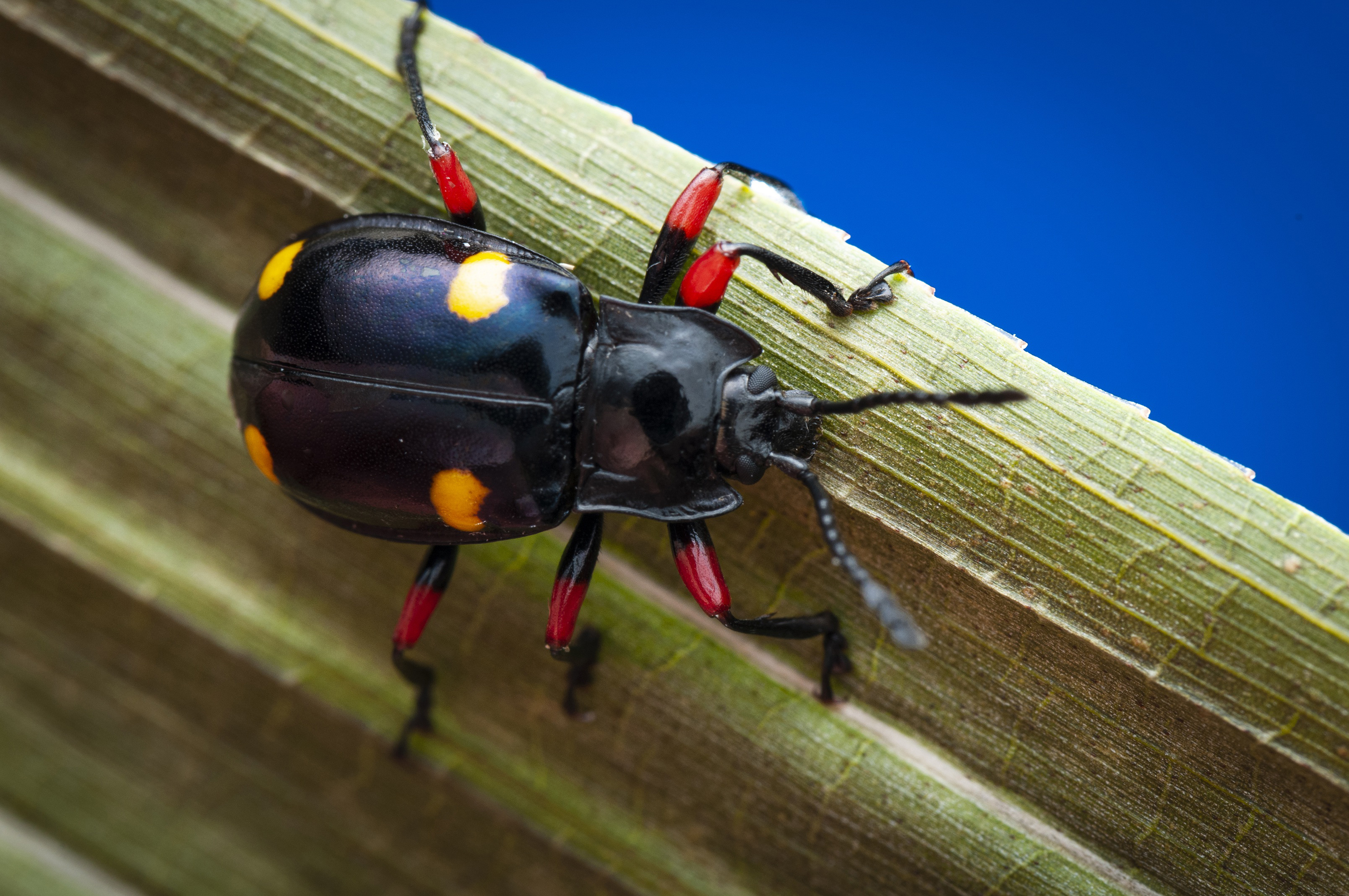
- Eumorphus_quadriguttatus_pulchripes, Adult, Korea

Scientific classification
- Kingdom: Animalia
- Phylum: Arthropoda
- Clade: Pancrustacea
- Class: Insecta
- Order: Coleoptera
- Suborder: Polyphaga
- Infraorder: Cucujiformia
- Family: Endomychidae
- Genus: Eumorphus
- Species: E. quadriguttatus

Binomial name
- Eumorphus quadriguttatus (Illiger, 1800)

Synonyms
- Erotylus quadriguttatus Illiger, 1800

= Eumorphus quadriguttatus =

Species of beetle

Eumorphus quadriguttatus, the four spotted handsome fungus beetle, is a species of handsome fungus beetle found in India, Andaman Islands, Sri Lanka and Korea.

== Description ==
Nominate subspecies has following characteristics. A medium-sized beetle with a length of about 10 to 12 mm. Body black, and moderately shiny. Antenna and legs are black whereas the part of the femur is reddish. Each elytron possess two large, pale yellowish, nearly round or slightly transverse spots. In antennae, the last 3 antennomeres are flat and broad. Apical margin of elytra in male is broadly rounded whereas female with clearly prolonged. The hairy pad of male is only restricted to the median part of the last two or three abdominal sternites. The subspecies pulchripes has a bright coral-red femora except in the basal half.

== Biology ==
Adult beetles are known to destroy Piper betle plantations.

== Subspecies ==
Four subspecies have been identified.

- Eumorphus quadriguttatus andamanensis Gorham, 1875
- Eumorphus quadriguttatus convexicollis Gerstaecker, 1857
- Eumorphus quadriguttatus pulchripes Gerstaecker, 1857
- Eumorphus quadriguttatus quadriguttatus (Illiger, 1800)

== Gallery ==
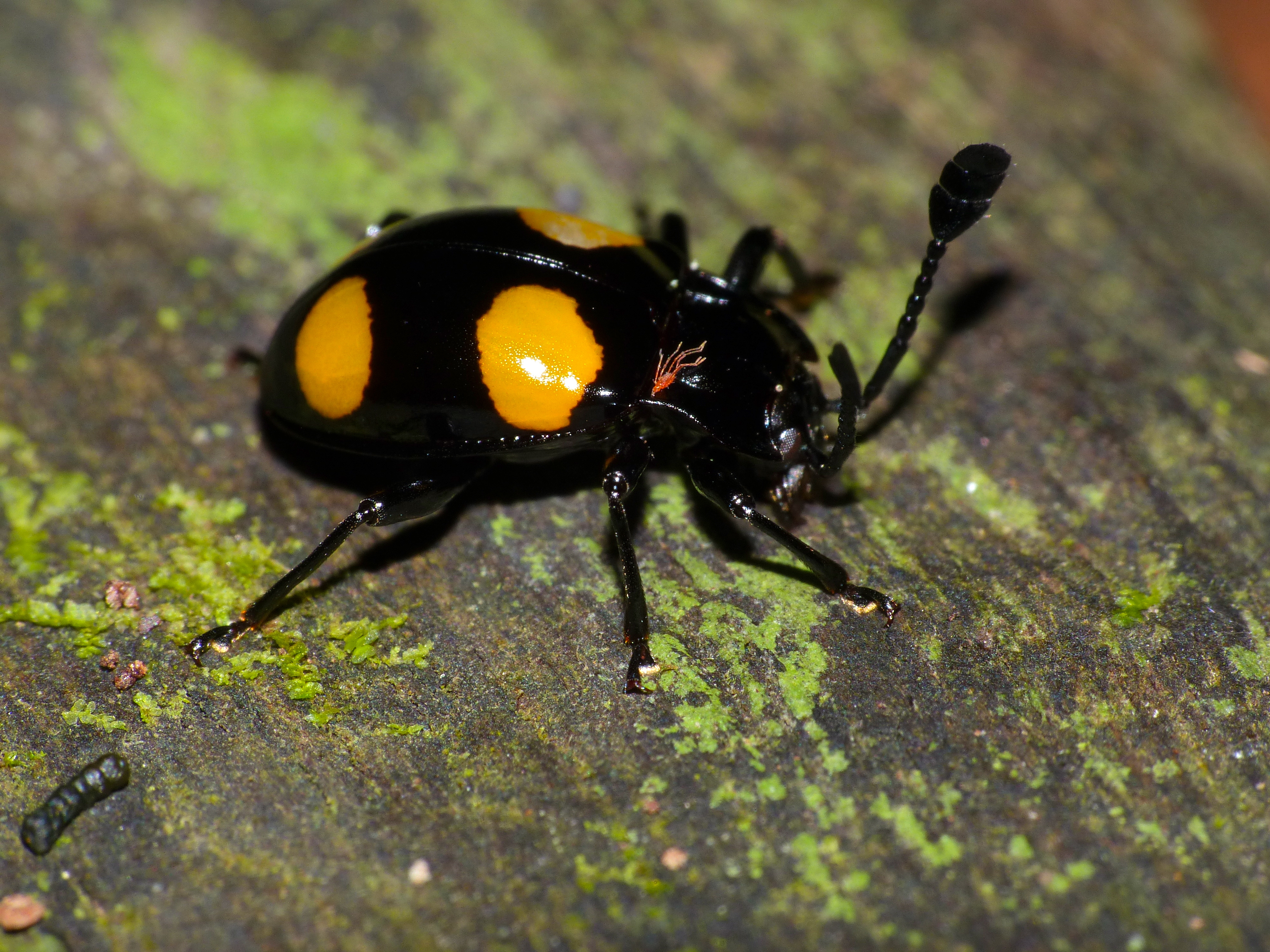

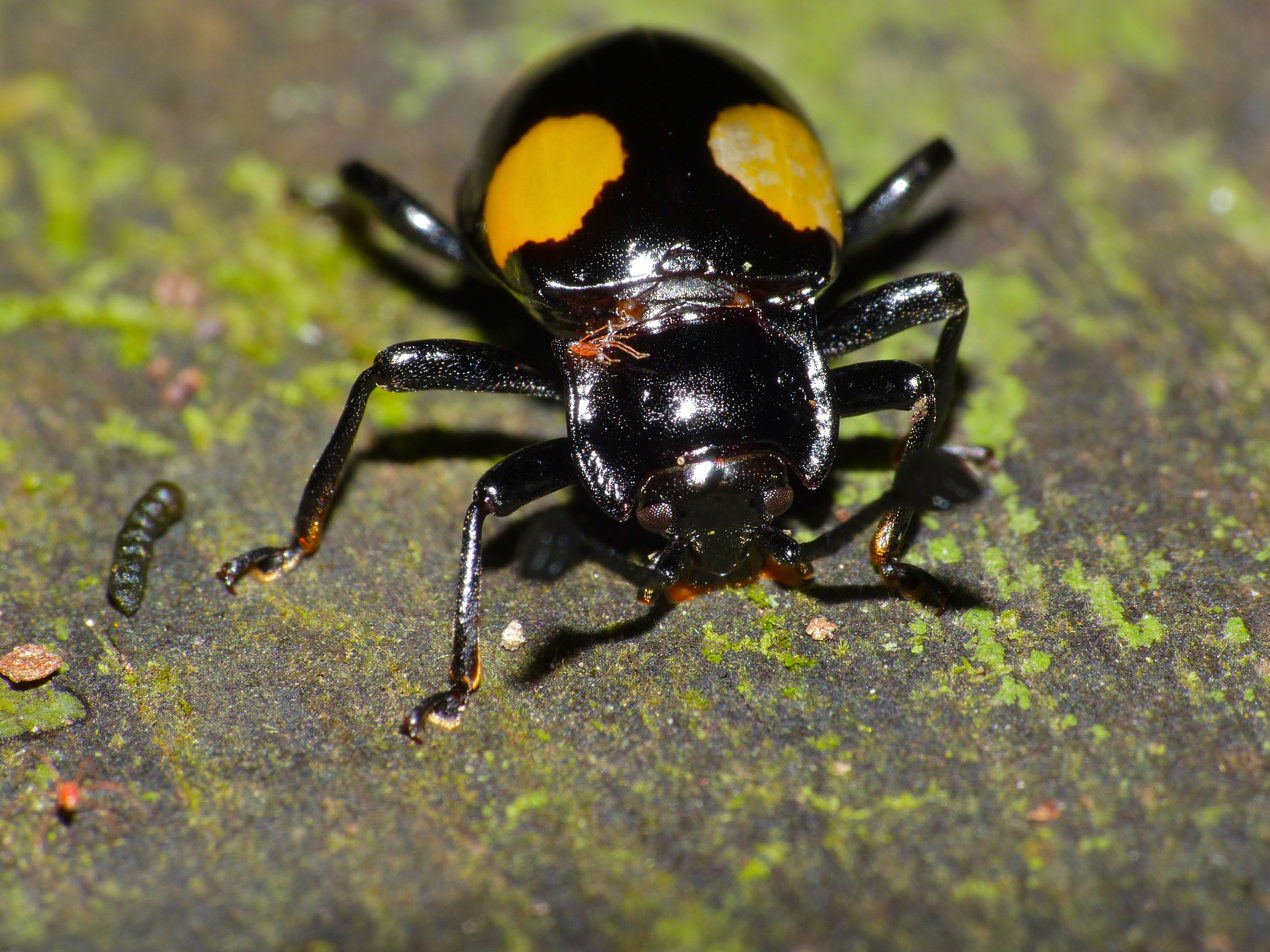
