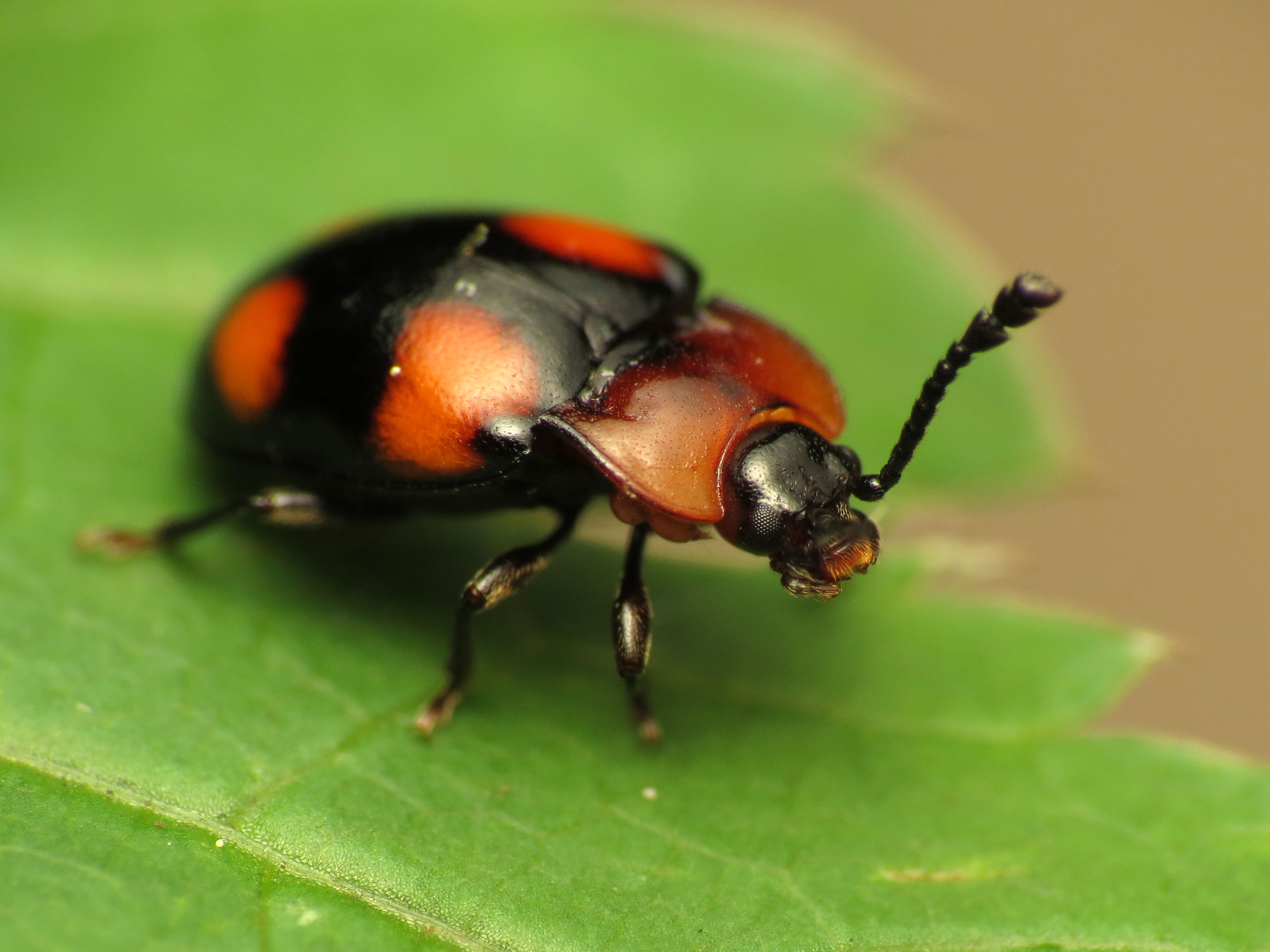
- Mycetina perpulchra

Scientific classification
- Kingdom: Animalia
- Phylum: Arthropoda
- Clade: Pancrustacea
- Class: Insecta
- Order: Coleoptera
- Suborder: Polyphaga
- Infraorder: Cucujiformia
- Family: Endomychidae
- Subfamily: Lycoperdininae
- Genus: Mycetina; Mulsant, 1846

= Mycetina =

Genus of beetles

Mycetina is a genus of handsome fungus beetles in the family Endomychidae.

== Selected species ==
The genus Mycetina includes roughly 70 species, such as:

- Mycetina amabilis
- Mycetina cruciata (Schaller, 1783)
- Mycetina cyanescens Strohecker
- Mycetina fulva Chujo, 1938
- Mycetina hornii Crotch, 1873
- Mycetina humerosignata Nakane, 1968
- Mycetina idahoensis Fall, 1907
- Mycetina pallida Horn, 1870
- Mycetina perpulchra (Newman, 1838)
- Mycetina sasajii Strohecker, 1982
- Mycetina similis (Chujo, 1938)
- Mycetina superba MAder, 1941
