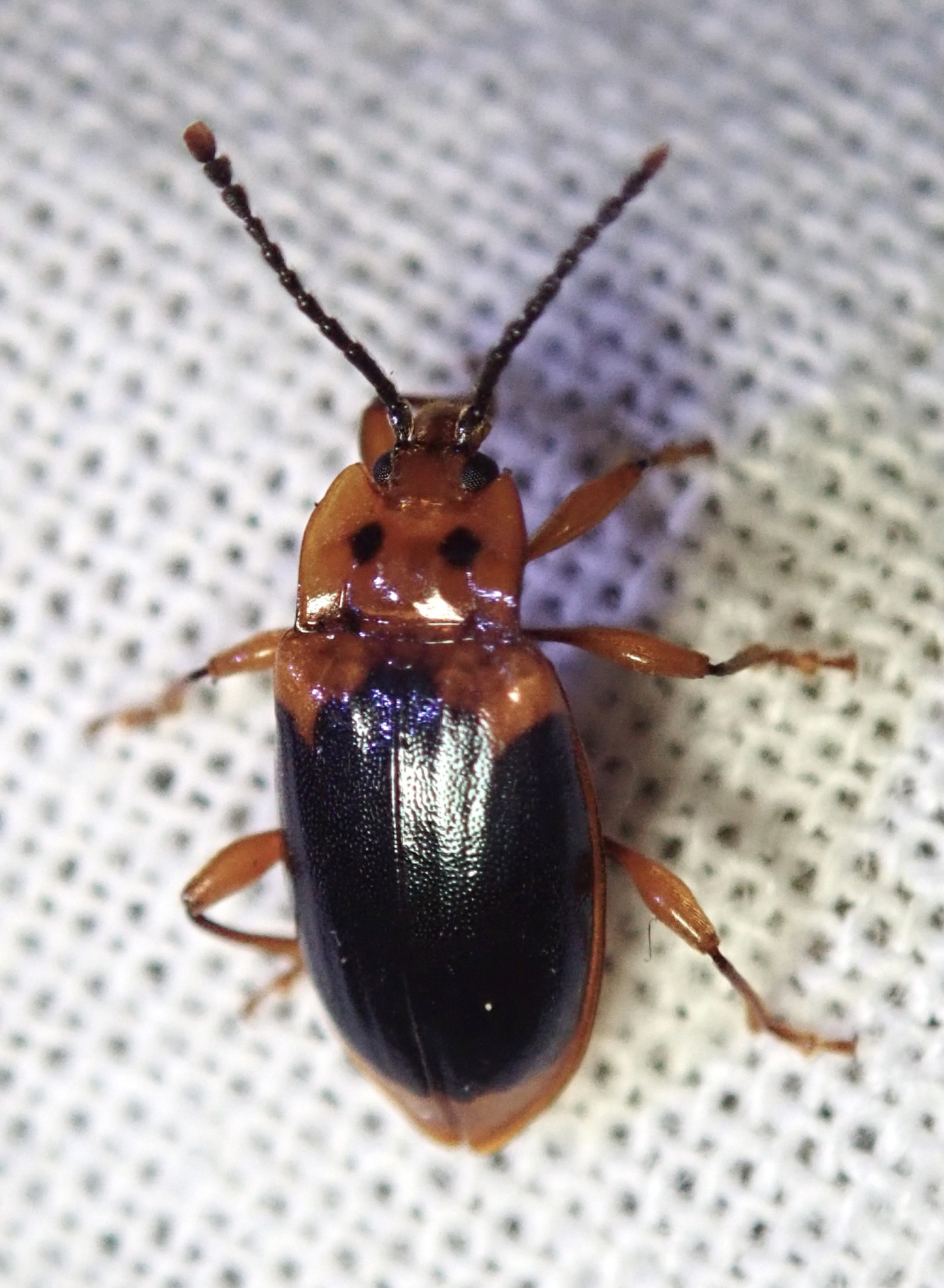

Scientific classification
- Domain: Eukaryota
- Kingdom: Animalia
- Phylum: Arthropoda
- Class: Insecta
- Order: Coleoptera
- Suborder: Polyphaga
- Infraorder: Cucujiformia
- Family: Endomychidae
- Genus: Aphorista
- Species: A. laeta

Binomial name
- Aphorista laeta (LeConte, 1854)

= Aphorista laeta =

Species of beetle

Aphorista laeta is a species of handsome fungus beetle in the family Endomychidae. It is found in North America.
