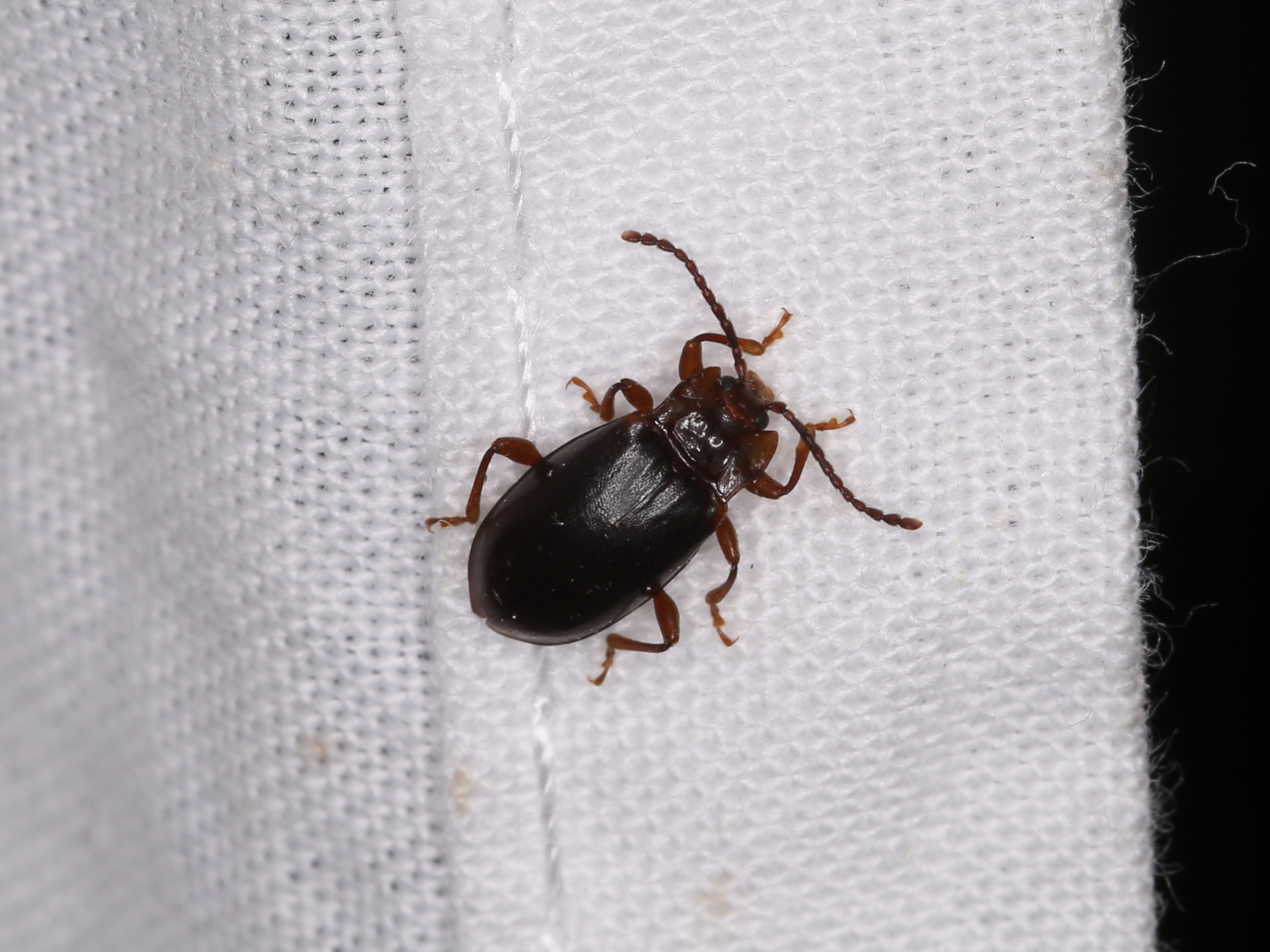

Scientific classification
- Domain: Eukaryota
- Kingdom: Animalia
- Phylum: Arthropoda
- Class: Insecta
- Order: Coleoptera
- Suborder: Polyphaga
- Infraorder: Cucujiformia
- Family: Endomychidae
- Genus: Aphorista
- Species: A. morosa

Binomial name
- Aphorista morosa (LeConte, 1859)

= Aphorista morosa =

Species of beetle

Aphorista morosa is a species of handsome fungus beetle in the family Endomychidae. It is found in North America.
