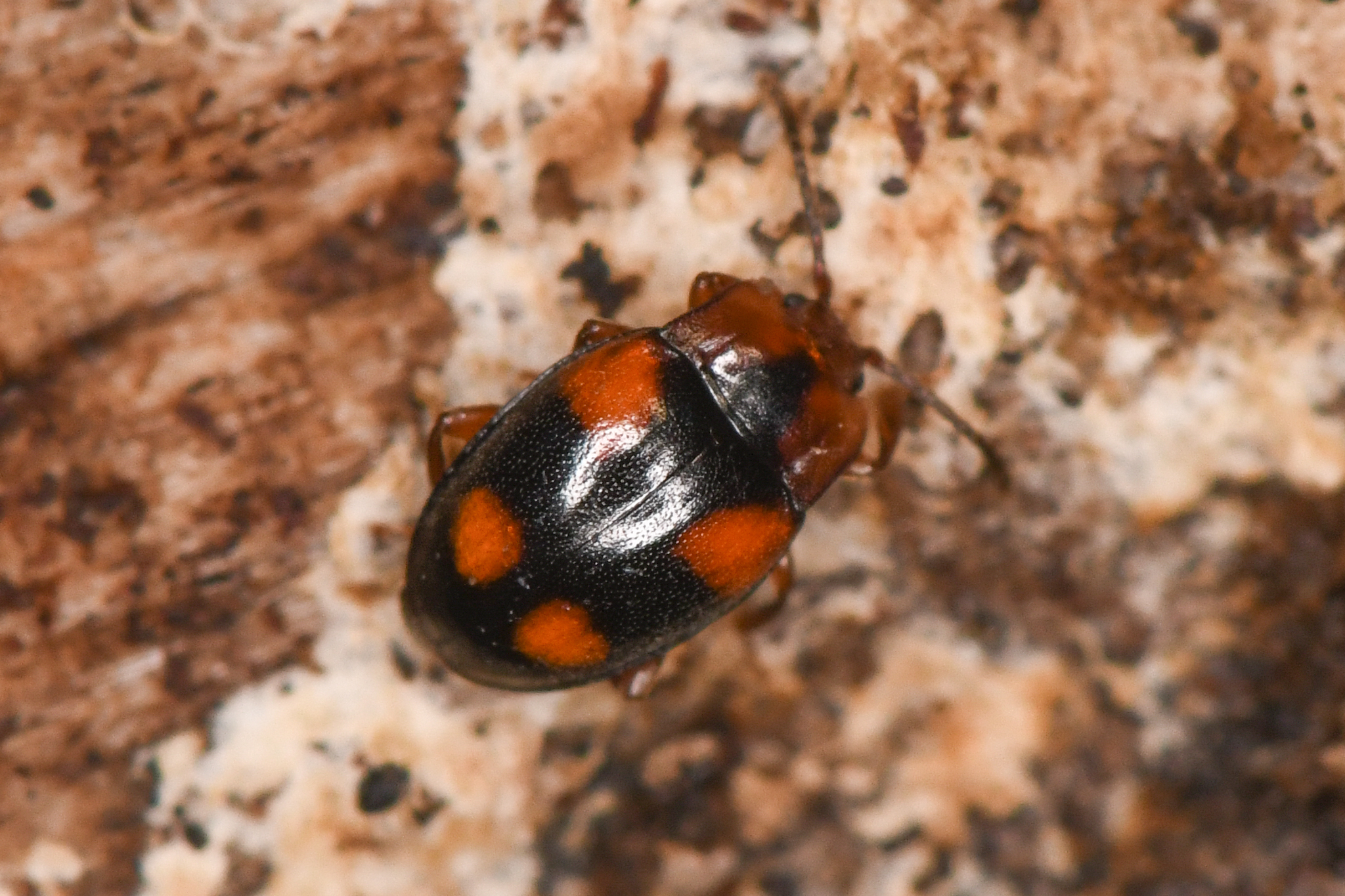

Scientific classification
- Domain: Eukaryota
- Kingdom: Animalia
- Phylum: Arthropoda
- Class: Insecta
- Order: Coleoptera
- Suborder: Polyphaga
- Infraorder: Cucujiformia
- Family: Endomychidae
- Genus: Mycetina
- Species: M. hornii

Binomial name
- Mycetina hornii Crotch, 1873

= Mycetina hornii =

Species of beetle

Mycetina hornii is a species of handsome fungus beetle in the family Endomychidae. It is found in North America.
