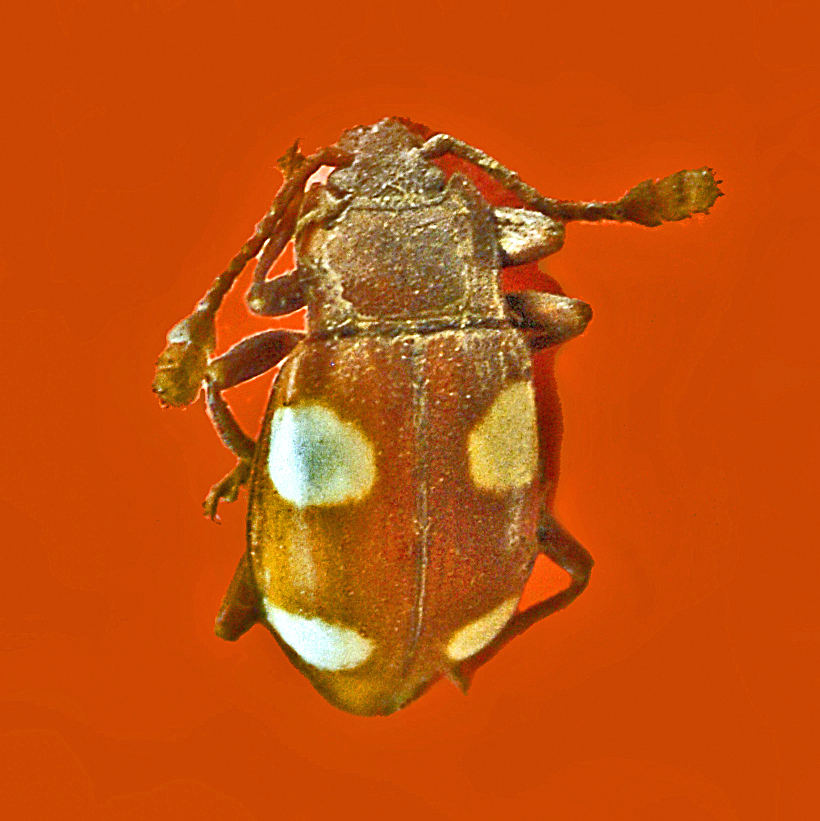
- Eumorphus alboguttatus. Museum specimen

Scientific classification
- Domain: Eukaryota
- Kingdom: Animalia
- Phylum: Arthropoda
- Class: Insecta
- Order: Coleoptera
- Suborder: Polyphaga
- Infraorder: Cucujiformia
- Family: Endomychidae
- Genus: Eumorphus
- Species: E. alboguttatus

Binomial name
- Eumorphus alboguttatus Gerstaecker, 1857

Synonyms
- Eumorphus quadrimaculatus Guérin-Ménéville, 1857

= Eumorphus alboguttatus =

Species of beetle

Eumorphus alboguttatus is a species of beetles belonging to the family Endomychidae.

== Description ==
Eumorphus alboguttatus can reach a length of about 10–11 millimetres (0.39–0.43 in). The basic color of the elytra is black, with large yellow spots.

== Distribution ==
This species can be found in Java.
