= Cymbachus elegans =

Scientific classification
- Kingdom: Animalia
- Phylum: Arthropoda
- Class: Insecta
- Order: Coleoptera
- Suborder: Polyphaga
- Infraorder: Cucujiformia
- Family: Endomychidae
- Genus: Cymbachus
- Species: C. elegans

Binomial name
- Cymbachus elegans Arrow, 1920

Species of beetle

Cymbachus elegans is a species of handsome fungus beetles in the genus Cymbachus. It is found in Laos, Southeast Asia.
