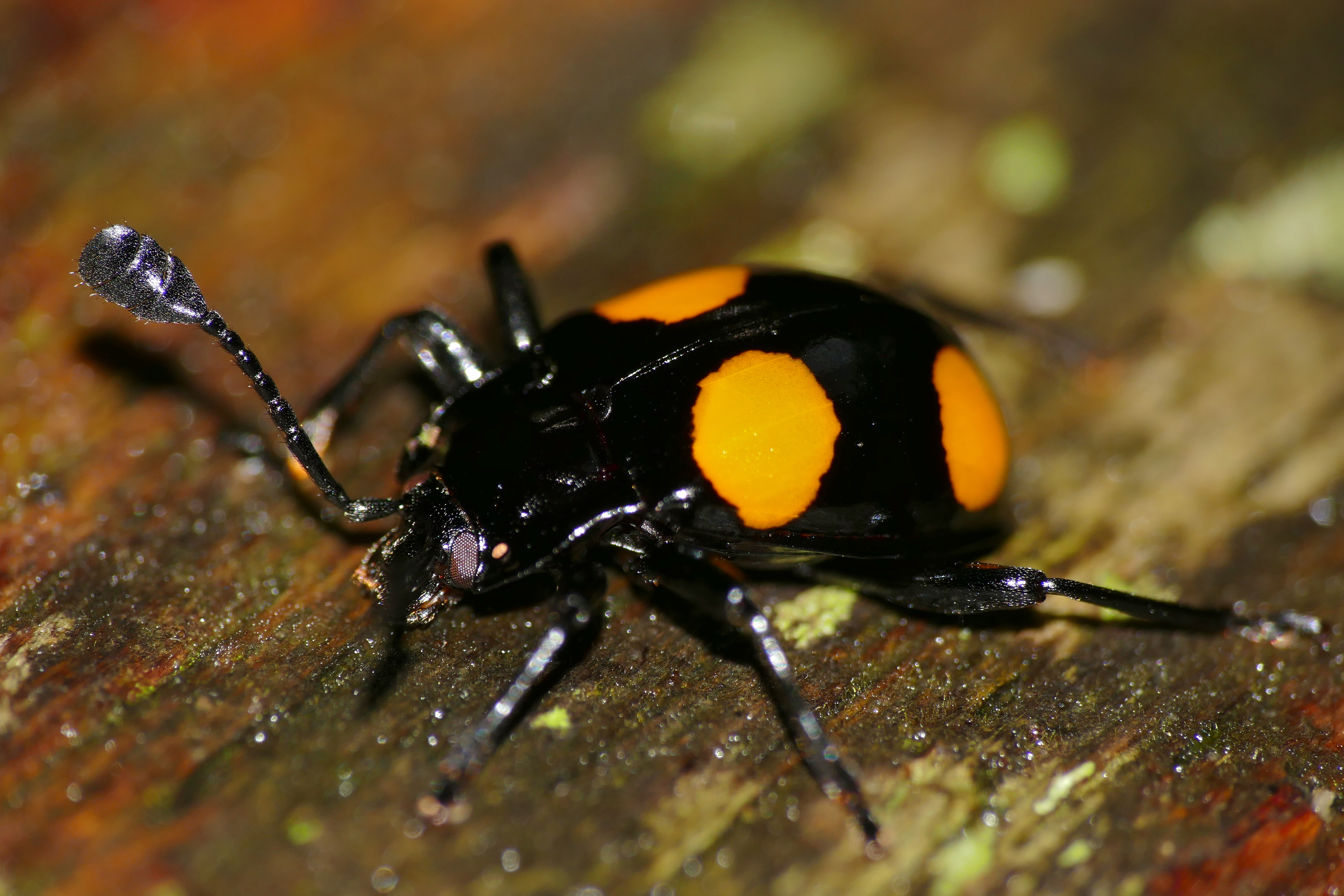
- Eumorphus westwoodi

Scientific classification
- Kingdom: Animalia
- Phylum: Arthropoda
- Clade: Pancrustacea
- Class: Insecta
- Order: Coleoptera
- Suborder: Polyphaga
- Infraorder: Cucujiformia
- Family: Endomychidae
- Subfamily: Lycoperdininae; Redtenbacher, 1844

Genera
- Achuarmychus; Acinaces; Amphisternus; Amphistethus; Ancylopus; Aphorista; Archipines; Avencymon; Beccariola; Brachytrycherus; Cacodaemon; Callimodapsa; Chetryrus; Chileanus; Corynomalus; Cymbachus; Cymones; Dapsa; Daulis; Daulotypus; Dryadites; Encymon; Eumorphus; Gerstaeckerus; Haploscelis; Hylaia; Hylaperdina; Indalmus; Lycoperdina; Malindus; Microtrycherus; Mycetina; Ohtaius; Parindalmus; Platindalmus; Polymus; Pseudindalmus; Sinocymbachus; Spathomeles; Stictomela; Stroheckeria; Trycherus

= Lycoperdininae =

Subfamily of beetles

Lycoperdininae is a beetle subfamily in the family Endomychidae.
