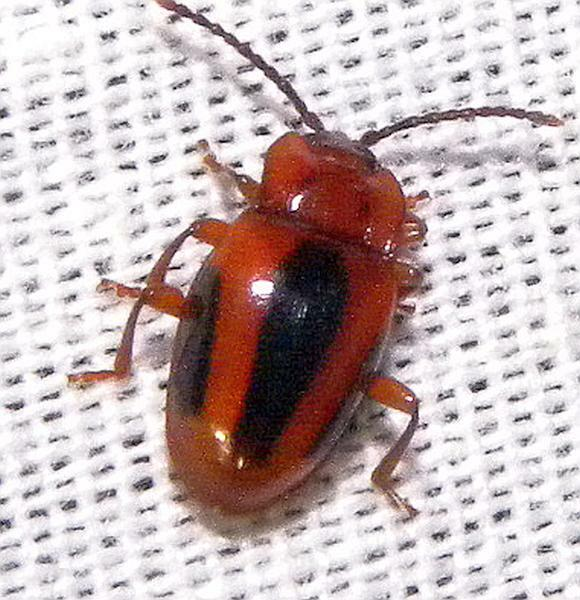

Scientific classification
- Kingdom: Animalia
- Phylum: Arthropoda
- Class: Insecta
- Order: Coleoptera
- Suborder: Polyphaga
- Infraorder: Cucujiformia
- Family: Endomychidae
- Genus: Aphorista
- Species: A. vittata

Binomial name
- Aphorista vittata (Fabricius, 1787)

= Aphorista vittata =

Species of beetle

Aphorista vittata is a species of handsome fungus beetle in the family Endomychidae. It is found in North America and Southern Asia.
