= Bystus ulkei =

Scientific classification
- Domain: Eukaryota
- Kingdom: Animalia
- Phylum: Arthropoda
- Class: Insecta
- Order: Coleoptera
- Suborder: Polyphaga
- Infraorder: Cucujiformia
- Family: Anamorphidae
- Genus: Bystus
- Species: B. ulkei

Binomial name
- Bystus ulkei (Crotch, 1873)

Species of beetle

Bystus ulkei is a species of beetle in the family Anamorphidae. It is found in North America.
