= Micropsephodes lundgreni =

Scientific classification
- Kingdom: Animalia
- Phylum: Arthropoda
- Class: Insecta
- Order: Coleoptera
- Suborder: Polyphaga
- Infraorder: Cucujiformia
- Family: Anamorphidae
- Genus: Micropsephodes
- Species: M. lundgreni

Binomial name
- Micropsephodes lundgreni Leschen & Carlton, 2000

Species of beetle

Micropsephodes lundgreni is a species of beetle in the family Anamorphidae. It is found in North America.
