= Endocoelus orbicularis =

Scientific classification
- Kingdom: Animalia
- Phylum: Arthropoda
- Clade: Pancrustacea
- Class: Insecta
- Order: Coleoptera
- Suborder: Polyphaga
- Infraorder: Cucujiformia
- Family: Anamorphidae
- Genus: Endocoelus
- Species: E. orbicularis

Binomial name
- Endocoelus orbicularis Gorham, 1886

Species of beetle

Endocoelus orbicularis is a species of beetle found in Sri Lanka.

== Description ==
Typical length of male is about 10 mm. Body orbicular. Head exerted, with small prominent coarsely granulated eyes. Elytra sub-globularly convex. Elytral disk is evenly and strongly punctured. Antennae with 10 segments where the two basal joints are stout. The third to the seventh segments are very short. The three last segments collectively form the elongate lax club. Thorax short, narrowed in front, with a raised thickened and flattened margin. Base is narrower than the elytra at their base. Tarsi are four-jointed, and are almost linear.
