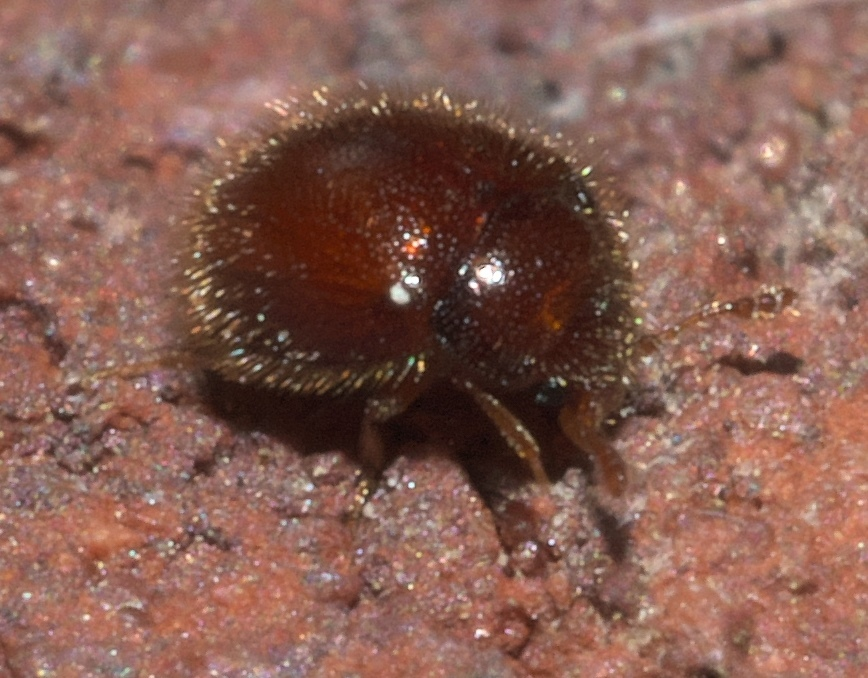
- Clemmus minor, Oklahoma

Scientific classification
- Domain: Eukaryota
- Kingdom: Animalia
- Phylum: Arthropoda
- Class: Insecta
- Order: Coleoptera
- Suborder: Polyphaga
- Infraorder: Cucujiformia
- Family: Anamorphidae
- Genus: Clemmus
- Species: C. minor

Binomial name
- Clemmus minor (Crotch, 1873)

= Clemmus minor =

Species of beetle

Clemmus minor is a species of beetle in the family Anamorphidae. It is found in North America.
