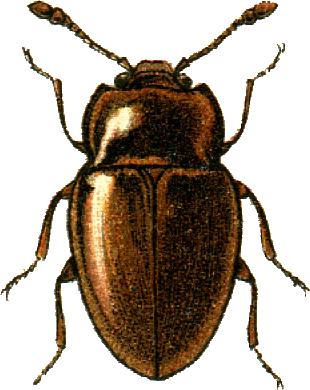

Scientific classification
- Domain: Eukaryota
- Kingdom: Animalia
- Phylum: Arthropoda
- Class: Insecta
- Order: Coleoptera
- Suborder: Polyphaga
- Infraorder: Cucujiformia
- Family: Anamorphidae
- Genus: Symbiotes
- Species: S. gibberosus

Binomial name
- Symbiotes gibberosus (Lucas, 1849)

= Symbiotes gibberosus =

Species of beetle

Symbiotes gibberosus is a species of beetle in the family Anamorphidae. It is found in Africa, Europe and Northern Asia (excluding China), and North America.
