= Rhymbomicrus lobatus =

Scientific classification
- Kingdom: Animalia
- Phylum: Arthropoda
- Class: Insecta
- Order: Coleoptera
- Suborder: Polyphaga
- Infraorder: Cucujiformia
- Family: Anamorphidae
- Genus: Rhymbomicrus
- Species: R. lobatus

Binomial name
- Rhymbomicrus lobatus (LeConte & Horn, 1883)

Species of beetle

Rhymbomicrus lobatus is a species of beetle in the family Anamorphidae. It is found in North America.
