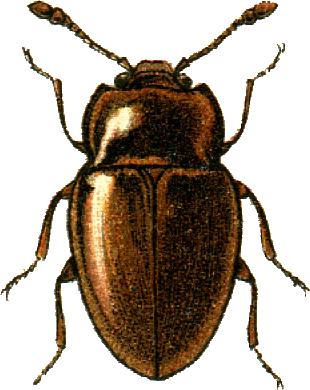
- Symbiotes gibberosus

Scientific classification
- Domain: Eukaryota
- Kingdom: Animalia
- Phylum: Arthropoda
- Class: Insecta
- Order: Coleoptera
- Suborder: Polyphaga
- Infraorder: Cucujiformia
- Family: Anamorphidae
- Genus: Symbiotes; Redtenbacher, 1847

= Symbiotes (beetle) =

Genus of beetles

Symbiotes is a genus of beetles in the family Anamorphidae. There are about five described species in Symbiotes.

ITIS Taxonomic note:

- Strohecker (1986) indicates the year of authorship should be 1847 rather than 1849 ("Blackwelder, 1949: 93 cites publication of Lied. 2 before Oct. 8, 1847").

== Species ==
These five species belong to the genus Symbiotes:

- Symbiotes armatus Reitter, 1881^{g}
- Symbiotes duryi Blatchley, 1910^{i c g}
- Symbiotes gibberosus (Lucas, 1849)^{i c g b}
- Symbiotes impressus Dury, 1912^{i c g}
- Symbiotes latus Redtenbacher, 1849^{g}

Data sources: i = ITIS, c = Catalogue of Life, g = GBIF, b = Bugguide.net
