= Micropsephodes =

Scientific classification
- Domain: Eukaryota
- Kingdom: Animalia
- Phylum: Arthropoda
- Class: Insecta
- Order: Coleoptera
- Suborder: Polyphaga
- Infraorder: Cucujiformia
- Family: Anamorphidae
- Genus: Micropsephodes; Champion, 1913

Genus of beetles

Micropsephodes is a genus of beetles in the family Anamorphidae. There are at least two described species in Micropsephodes.

== Species ==
These two species belong to the genus Micropsephodes:

- Micropsephodes lundgreni Leschen & Carlton, 2000
- Micropsephodes serraticornis Champion, 1913
