= Bystus =

Scientific classification
- Kingdom: Animalia
- Phylum: Arthropoda
- Clade: Pancrustacea
- Class: Insecta
- Order: Coleoptera
- Suborder: Polyphaga
- Infraorder: Cucujiformia
- Family: Anamorphidae
- Genus: Bystus; Guérin-Méneville, 1857

Genus of beetles

Bystus is a genus of beetles in the family Anamorphidae. There are about six described species in Bystus.

== Species ==
These six species belong to the genus Bystus:

- Bystus apicalis (Gerstaecker, 1858)
- Bystus fibulatus (Gorham, 1890)
- Bystus hemisphaericus (Gerstaecker, 1858)
- Bystus limbatus (Gorham, 1873)
- Bystus seminulum Gorham, 1873
- Bystus ulkei (Crotch, 1873)
