= Rhymbomicrus =

Scientific classification
- Kingdom: Animalia
- Phylum: Arthropoda
- Class: Insecta
- Order: Coleoptera
- Suborder: Polyphaga
- Infraorder: Cucujiformia
- Family: Anamorphidae
- Genus: Rhymbomicrus; Casey, 1916

Genus of beetles

Rhymbomicrus is a genus of beetles in the family Anamorphidae. There are at least four described species in Rhymbomicrus.

== Species ==
These four species belong to the genus Rhymbomicrus:

- Rhymbomicrus caseyi Pakaluk, 1987
- Rhymbomicrus hemisphaericus (Champion, 1913)
- Rhymbomicrus lobatus (LeConte & Horn, 1883)
- Rhymbomicrus stephani Pakaluk, 1987
