= Clemmus =

Scientific classification
- Domain: Eukaryota
- Kingdom: Animalia
- Phylum: Arthropoda
- Class: Insecta
- Order: Coleoptera
- Suborder: Polyphaga
- Infraorder: Cucujiformia
- Family: Anamorphidae
- Genus: Clemmus; Hampe, 1850

Genus of beetles

Clemmus is a genus of beetles in the family Anamorphidae. There are at least two described species in Clemmus.

== Species ==
These two species belong to the genus Clemmus:

- Clemmus minor (Crotch, 1873)
- Clemmus troglodytes Hampe, 1850
