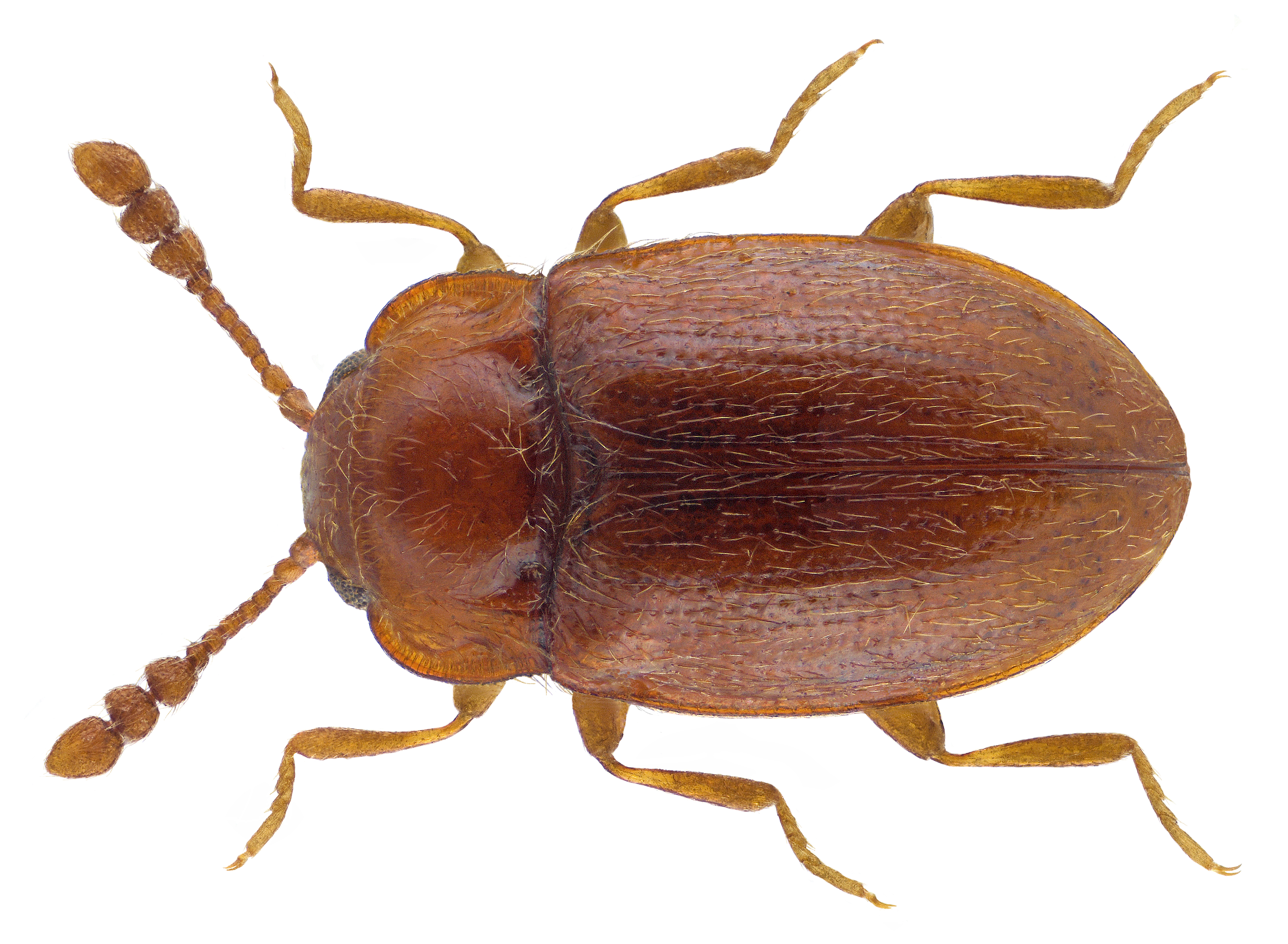
- Symbiotes latus

Scientific classification
- Kingdom: Animalia
- Phylum: Arthropoda
- Clade: Pancrustacea
- Class: Insecta
- Order: Coleoptera
- Suborder: Polyphaga
- Infraorder: Cucujiformia
- Superfamily: Coccinelloidea
- Family: Anamorphidae; Strohecker, 1953

Synonyms
- Acritosomatinae Pakaluk and Slipinski, 1995

= Anamorphidae =

Anamorphidae Temporal range: Late Cretaceous–Recent

Family of beetles

Anamorphidae is a family of beetles in the superfamily Coccinelloidea, formerly included within the family Endomychidae. They are found worldwide. Like enchomyids, they are fungivores, with adult and larval stages thought to exclusively consume fungal spores.

== Genera ==
After

- Aclemmysa Reitter, 1904
- Acritosoma Pakaluk and Slipinski, 1995
- Afralexia Strohecker, 1967
- Anagaricophilus Arrow, 1922
- Anamorphus LeConte, 1878
- Anamycetaea Strohecker, 1975c
- Asymbius Gorham, 1896
- Austroclemmus Strohecker, 1953a
- Baeochelys Strohecker, 1974b
- Bryodryas Strohecker, 1974d
- Bystodes Strohecker, 1953a
- Bystus Guérin-Méneville, 1857
- Catapotia Thomson, 1860 (= Cremnodes Gerstäcker, 1858, nec Förster, 1850: preoccupied)
- Clemmus Hampe, 1850
- Coryphus Csiki, 1902b
- Cyrtomychus Kolbe, 1910
- Cysalemma Dajoz, 1970b
- Dexialia Sasaji, 1970
- Dialexia Gorham, 1887–99
- Endocoelus Gorham, 1886
- Erotendomychus Lea, 1922
- Exysma Gorham, 1891
- Exysmodes Dajoz, 1970a
- Geoendomychus Lea, 1922
- Idiophyes Blackburn, 1895
- Loeblia Dajoz, 1972a
- Malagaricophilus Strohecker, 1974d
- Micropsephodes Champion, 1913
- Micropsephus Gorham, 1891
- Mychothenus Strohecker, 1953a
- Papuella Strohecker, 1956a
- Pararhymbus Arrow, 1920b
- Parasymbius Arrow, 1920a
- Rhymbillus Reichensperger, 1915
- Rhymbomicrus Casey, 1916
- Symbiotes Redtenbacher, 1847

Extinct genera and a species of Symbiotes are known from Eocene aged Baltic and Bitterfeld amber. Members of the extinct genus Palaeosymbius are known from the Late Cretaceous Burmese amber from Myanmar.
