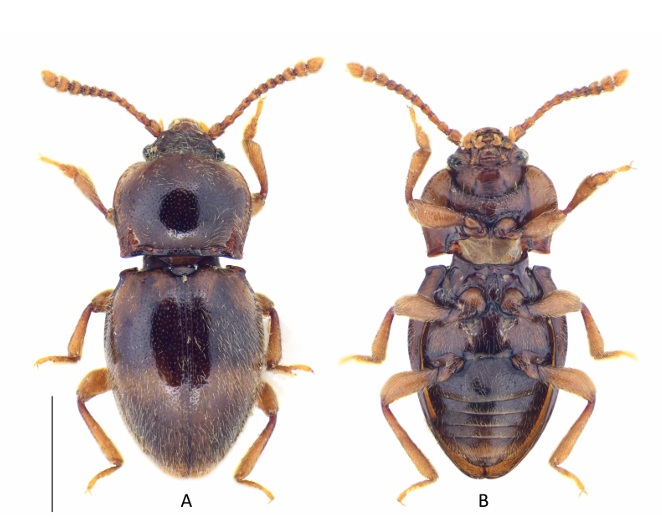
- Sinopanamomus crypticus

Scientific classification
- Domain: Eukaryota
- Kingdom: Animalia
- Phylum: Arthropoda
- Class: Insecta
- Order: Coleoptera
- Suborder: Polyphaga
- Infraorder: Cucujiformia
- Family: Endomychidae
- Subfamily: Leiestinae
- Genus: Sinopanamomus; Esser, 2019

= Sinopanamomus =

Genus of insects

Sinopanamomus is a genus of beetles belonging to the family Endomychidae.

== Selected species ==
- Sinopanamomus crypticus Shi, 2025
- Sinopanamomus yunnanensis Esser, 2019
