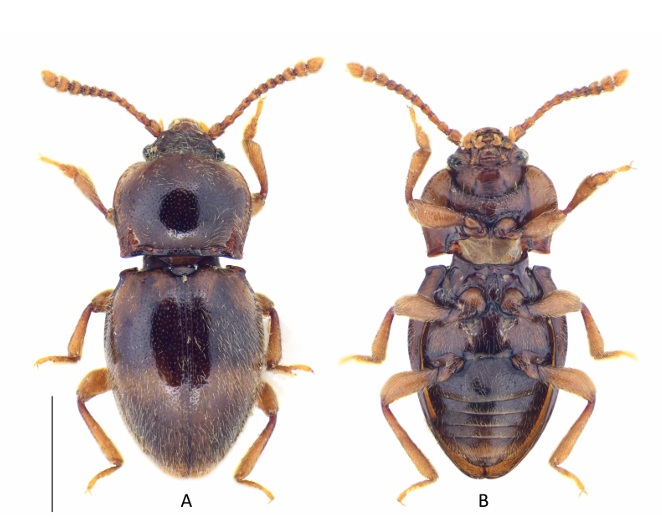

Scientific classification
- Domain: Eukaryota
- Kingdom: Animalia
- Phylum: Arthropoda
- Class: Insecta
- Order: Coleoptera
- Suborder: Polyphaga
- Infraorder: Cucujiformia
- Family: Endomychidae
- Genus: Sinopanamomus
- Species: S. crypticus

Binomial name
- Sinopanamomus crypticus Shi, 2025

= Sinopanamomus crypticus =

Species of beetle

Sinopanamomus crypticus is a species of beetle of the Scarabaeidae family. This species is found in China, where it has only been recorded from the Gaoligong mountain range in western Yunnan.

Adults reach a length of 3.1 mm. The dorsum is largely dark brown, with a vague light brown pattern on the elytra and pronotum.

== Etymology ==
The name of the species is derived from the Greek root crypt- (meaning hidden) and refers to the secretive habits of this rare species under a highly closed forest in mid-high elevation in Western Yunnan.
