= Stripsipher spectralis =

Scientific classification
- Kingdom: Animalia
- Phylum: Arthropoda
- Clade: Pancrustacea
- Class: Insecta
- Order: Coleoptera
- Suborder: Polyphaga
- Infraorder: Scarabaeiformia
- Family: Scarabaeidae
- Genus: Stripsipher
- Species: S. spectralis

Binomial name
- Stripsipher spectralis Arrow, 1926

Species of beetle

Stripsipher spectralis is a species of beetle of the family Scarabaeidae. It is found in South Africa (Eastern Cape, KwaZulu-Natal).

== Description ==
Adults reach a length of about 9.2 mm (0.36 in) for males and 8.4 mm (0.33 in) for females. They are similar to Stripsipher zebra and Stripsipher centralis, but may be distinguished by the white tomentum areas or spots on the pronotum, scutellum, elytra and pygidium, as well as the scattered, whitish short hairs on the pygidium.
