= Campulipus suturalis =

Scientific classification
- Kingdom: Animalia
- Phylum: Arthropoda
- Clade: Pancrustacea
- Class: Insecta
- Order: Coleoptera
- Suborder: Polyphaga
- Infraorder: Scarabaeiformia
- Family: Scarabaeidae
- Genus: Campulipus
- Species: C. suturalis

Binomial name
- Campulipus suturalis (Waterhouse, 1885)

Synonyms
- Agenius suturalis Waterhouse, 1885; Agenius namaquensis Péringuey, 1885

Species of beetle

Campulipus suturalis is a species of beetle of the family Scarabaeidae. It is found in South Africa (Northern Cape).

== Description ==
Adults reach a length of about 13.5–16.5 mm (0.53–0.65 in). Males are black, with the elytra light straw-colour with a somewhat broad outer marginal black band and a sutural one reaching from the base to the apex. The clypeus, head and pronotum are shaped and sculptured as in Campulipus clavus, but the latter is covered with a moderately dense, long, greyish pubescence. The elytra, which are shaped like those of clavus, are more distinctly punctate, and the intermediate tibiae are also strongly curved inwardly. The pygidium and underside are clothed with a very dense greyish pubescence. Females are similar in shape and sculpture to females of clavus, but the elytra instead of being entirely black are brick-red, with a very broad sutural band reaching from base to apex, and have a similarly broad outer marginal one. These two bands coalesce occasionally, leaving only the basal part red. The underside is glabrous.
