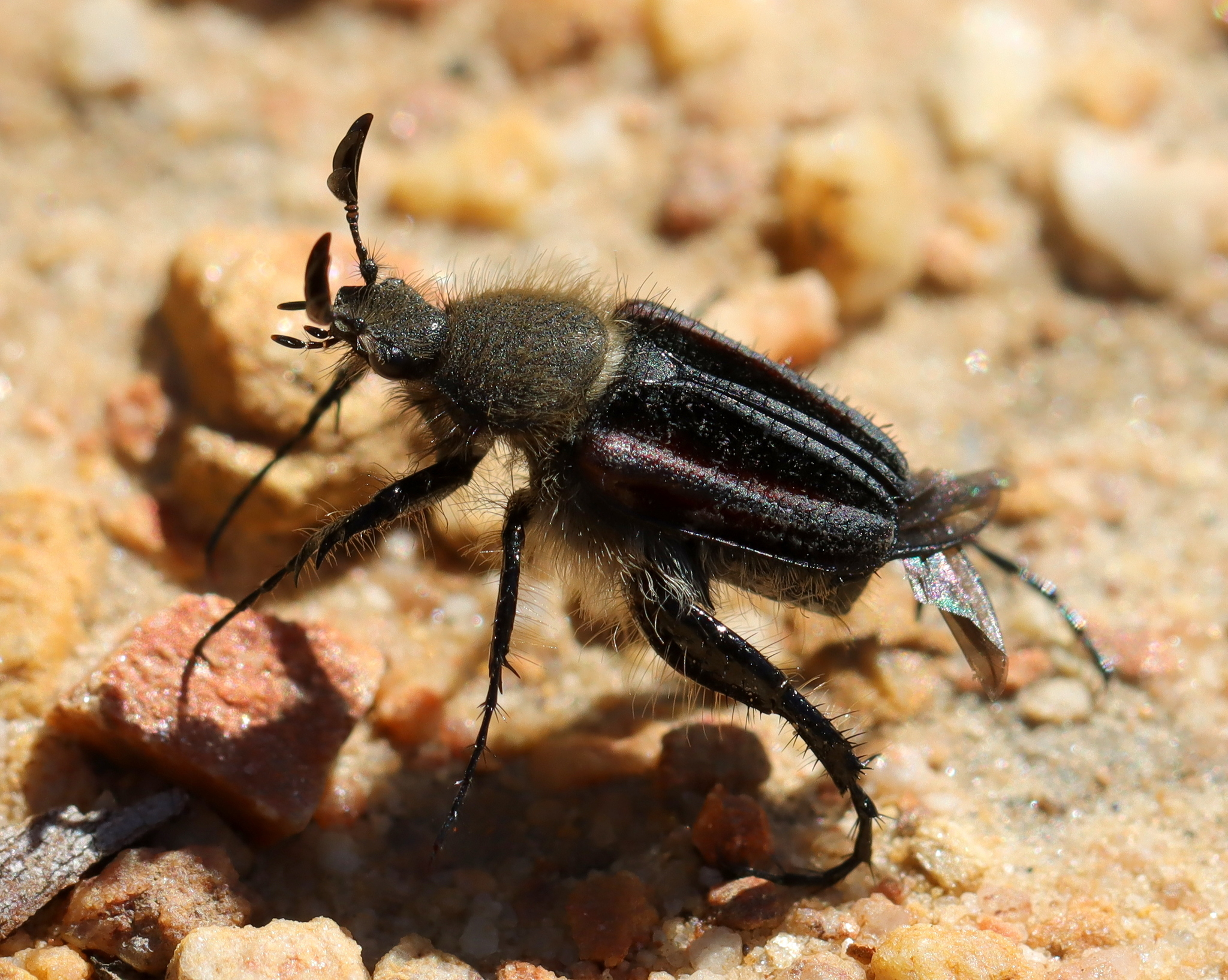

Scientific classification
- Kingdom: Animalia
- Phylum: Arthropoda
- Clade: Pancrustacea
- Class: Insecta
- Order: Coleoptera
- Suborder: Polyphaga
- Infraorder: Scarabaeiformia
- Family: Scarabaeidae
- Genus: Brachagenius
- Species: B. lugubris

Binomial name
- Brachagenius lugubris (Péringuey, 1888)

Synonyms
- Stegopterus lugubris Péringuey, 1888; Xiphoscelidus lugubris

= Brachagenius lugubris =

Species of beetle

Brachagenius lugubris is a species of beetle of the family Scarabaeidae. It is found in South Africa (Western Cape).

== Description ==
Adults reach a length of about 9–11 mm (0.35–0.43 in). Males are black, with the elytra rufescent-brown, and on each side a discoidal, black, sub-velvety patch. The head and clypeus are deeply punctured and clothed with moderately dense, long, flavescent hairs. The pronotum is shagreened and clothed with partly appressed, long, but not very dense, flavescent hairs. The scutellum is scabrosely punctate and glabrous and the elytra have a series of short, equidistant, erect, black setae. The propygidium is only partly covered by the elytra, and their apical edge overhangs the triangular, vertical, but slightly convex pygidium. Females are completely black, and have the sub-velvety discoidal band on each side of the elytra always conspicuous. The pronotum is like that of the males, but with long, bristly hairs laterally.
