= Calometopidius ducarmei =

Scientific classification
- Kingdom: Animalia
- Phylum: Arthropoda
- Clade: Pancrustacea
- Class: Insecta
- Order: Coleoptera
- Suborder: Polyphaga
- Infraorder: Scarabaeiformia
- Family: Scarabaeidae
- Genus: Calometopidius
- Species: C. ducarmei

Binomial name
- Calometopidius ducarmei (Ricchiardi, 2011)

Synonyms
- Calometopus ducarmei Ricchiardi, 2011

Species of beetle

Calometopidius ducarmei is a species of beetle of the family Scarabaeidae. It is found in the Democratic Republic of the Congo.

== Description ==
Adults reach a length of about 14.2 mm (0.56 in). The body is black, glabrous and shiny, with the pronotum, propygidium and pygidium black and the abdomen brownish.

== Etymology ==
The species is dedicated to Robert Ducarme, who collected the holotype.
