= Brachagenius pictipennis =

Scientific classification
- Kingdom: Animalia
- Phylum: Arthropoda
- Clade: Pancrustacea
- Class: Insecta
- Order: Coleoptera
- Suborder: Polyphaga
- Infraorder: Scarabaeiformia
- Family: Scarabaeidae
- Genus: Brachagenius
- Species: B. pictipennis

Binomial name
- Brachagenius pictipennis Kraatz, 1890

Species of beetle

Brachagenius pictipennis is a species of beetle of the family Scarabaeidae. It is found in South Africa (Western Cape).

== Description ==
Adults reach a length of about 11 mm (0.43 in). They are black and opaque, with the elytra brownish, with the suture, the sides, an oblique discoidal line and a median spot black, and with the apex more broadly black than the sides. The clypeus is slightly incised at the apex with the sides slightly raised and the anterior angles almost rounded. The pronotum is densely rugulose punctate and fulvous pilose and the elytra are sparingly nigro-pilose, the anterior tibiae tri-dentate, the apical tooth is the longest, the basal one the shortest, but yet plain. The tarsi are very slender.
