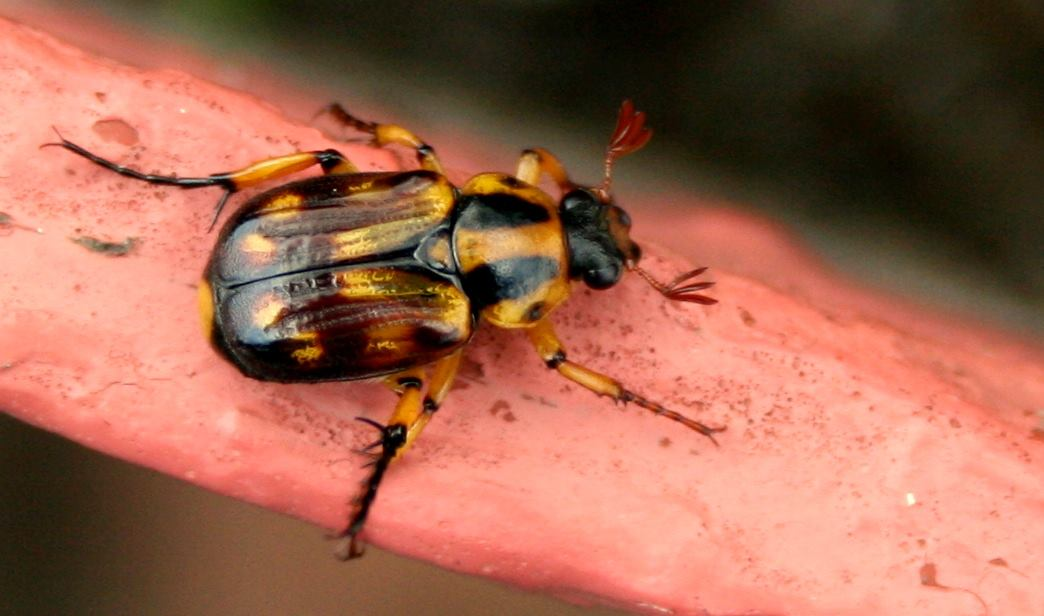

Scientific classification
- Kingdom: Animalia
- Phylum: Arthropoda
- Clade: Pancrustacea
- Class: Insecta
- Order: Coleoptera
- Suborder: Polyphaga
- Infraorder: Scarabaeiformia
- Family: Scarabaeidae
- Genus: Stripsipher
- Species: S. orientalis

Binomial name
- Stripsipher orientalis Ricchiardi, Perissinotto & Clennell, 2008

= Stripsipher orientalis =

Species of beetle

Stripsipher orientalis, the common wood chafer, is a species of beetle of the family Scarabaeidae. It is found in South Africa (Eastern Cape, KwaZulu-Natal, Mpumalanga, Gauteng, North West, Limpopo) and Eswatini.

== Description ==
Adults reach a length of about 10.3–14 mm (0.41–0.55 in). The head is black, glabrous and covered by strong, converging punctures and the antennae are reddish-orange. The pronotum is shiny, glabrous and orange with some scattered punctures and two longitudinal black bands. The elytra are glabrous, shiny and orange.
