= Gnorimotrichius =

Scientific classification
- Kingdom: Animalia
- Phylum: Arthropoda
- Clade: Pancrustacea
- Class: Insecta
- Order: Coleoptera
- Suborder: Polyphaga
- Infraorder: Scarabaeiformia
- Family: Scarabaeidae
- Subfamily: Cetoniinae
- Tribe: Trichiini
- Genus: Gnorimotrichius; Krajčik, 2009

Genus of leaf beetles

Gnorimotrichius is a genus of beetles belonging to the family Scarabaeidae.

== Species ==
- Gnorimotrichius albomaculatus (Moser, 1903)
- Gnorimotrichius masumotoi (Fujioka, 2011)
- Gnorimotrichius signatus (Chûjô, 1940)
- Gnorimotrichius trilineatus (Ma, 1992)
- Gnorimotrichius tronqueti (Antoine, 2002)
