= Brachagenius oculatus =

Scientific classification
- Kingdom: Animalia
- Phylum: Arthropoda
- Clade: Pancrustacea
- Class: Insecta
- Order: Coleoptera
- Suborder: Polyphaga
- Infraorder: Scarabaeiformia
- Family: Scarabaeidae
- Genus: Brachagenius
- Species: B. oculatus

Binomial name
- Brachagenius oculatus Evans, 1987

Species of beetle

Brachagenius oculatus is a species of beetle of the family Scarabaeidae. It is found in South Africa (Western Cape).

== Description ==
Adults reach a length of about 11–12 mm (0.43–0.47 in). The head, pronotum, scutellum and venter are piceous, while the elytra are velvety black with a testaceous patch between the elytral margin and the humerus and a larger testaceous patch between the humerus and scutellum.
