= Paratrichius nepalensis =

Scientific classification
- Kingdom: Animalia
- Phylum: Arthropoda
- Clade: Pancrustacea
- Class: Insecta
- Order: Coleoptera
- Suborder: Polyphaga
- Infraorder: Scarabaeiformia
- Family: Scarabaeidae
- Genus: Paratrichius
- Species: P. nepalensis

Binomial name
- Paratrichius nepalensis Ricchiardi, 2018

Species of beetle

Paratrichius nepalensis is a species of beetle of the family Scarabaeidae. It is found in Nepal.

== Description ==
Adults reach a length of about 9.7 mm (0.38 in) for males and 12.5 mm (0.49 in) for females. The body is black, with the dorsal surface opaque and the ventral surface shining. The clypeus and the margins of the elytra are testaceous. There are chalky lines and markings on the pronotum and elytra.

== Etymology ==
The species is named after the country where it was collected.
