= Calometopus =

Scientific classification
- Kingdom: Animalia
- Phylum: Arthropoda
- Clade: Pancrustacea
- Class: Insecta
- Order: Coleoptera
- Suborder: Polyphaga
- Infraorder: Scarabaeiformia
- Family: Scarabaeidae
- Subfamily: Cetoniinae
- Tribe: Trichiini
- Genus: Calometopus; Blanchard, 1850

Synonyms
- Trichiomorphus Bourgoin, 1919; Praelinotarsia Duvivier, 1891

Genus of leaf beetles

Calometopus is a genus of beetles belonging to the family Scarabaeidae.

== Species ==
- Calometopus aranciatus Ricchiardi, 2001
- Calometopus aureipennis Moser, 1914
- Calometopus gracilipes (Bourgoin, 1919)
- Calometopus hirsutus Burgeon, 1934
- Calometopus hollisi Waterhouse, 1898
- Calometopus kamerunensis Moser, 1916
- Calometopus legrandi Ricchiardi, 2015
- Calometopus limbatipennis (Duvivier, 1891)
- Calometopus lineosus Ricchiardi, 2001
- Calometopus luridus Arrow, 1922
- Calometopus lusitaniae Bourgoin, 1917
- Calometopus modestus Ricchiardi, 2001
- Calometopus nigerrimus Schein, 1956
- Calometopus nyassae Westwood, 1878
- Calometopus obscuratus Ricchiardi, 2001
- Calometopus overlaeti Burgeon, 1934
- Calometopus planatus Waterhouse, 1885
- Calometopus reichenbachi Ricchiardi, 2019
- Calometopus rufus (Bourgoin, 1919)
- Calometopus senegalensis Blanchard, 1850
- Calometopus similis Ricchiardi, 2001
- Calometopus transparens Arrow, 1922
- Calometopus unicolor Ricchiardi, 2001
- Calometopus werneri Ricchiardi, 2019
