= Paratrichius adornatus =

Scientific classification
- Kingdom: Animalia
- Phylum: Arthropoda
- Clade: Pancrustacea
- Class: Insecta
- Order: Coleoptera
- Suborder: Polyphaga
- Infraorder: Scarabaeiformia
- Family: Scarabaeidae
- Genus: Paratrichius
- Species: P. adornatus

Binomial name
- Paratrichius adornatus Ricchiardi, 2019

Species of beetle

Paratrichius adornatus is a species of beetle of the family Scarabaeidae. It is found in China (Sichuan).

== Description ==
Adults reach a length of about 10.2–11.5 mm (0.40–0.45 in). They have an elongate body, with slender legs. The head is black, slightly shiny and covered with long, fulvous setae. Both the clypeus and frons are covered with pale yellow chalky material. The antennae are fulvous. The pronotum is black and dull and has a fulvous band and a band of pale-yellow chalky material around the margins. The elytra are black and dull, each with a fulvous band along the margins and six pale yellow, chalky patches.

== Etymology ==
The species name is derived from Latin adorned (meaning ornamented).
