= Epitrichius australis =

Scientific classification
- Kingdom: Animalia
- Phylum: Arthropoda
- Clade: Pancrustacea
- Class: Insecta
- Order: Coleoptera
- Suborder: Polyphaga
- Infraorder: Scarabaeiformia
- Family: Scarabaeidae
- Genus: Epitrichius
- Species: E. australis

Binomial name
- Epitrichius australis Ricchiardi, 2018

Species of beetle

Epitrichius australis is a species of beetle of the family Scarabaeidae. It is found in Vietnam.

== Description ==
Adults reach a length of about 13.8–17.3 mm (0.54–0.68 in). They have a elongate-oval, mostly black body. The elytra are black with two dull yellow bands joined with a similar band along the suture. The pronotum, head, clypeus, scutellum and legs have a shining metallic lustre.

== Etymology ==
The species name is derived from Latin australis (meaning of the south) and refers to the fact that it is the southernmost known species of the genus.
