= Myodermum variegatum =

Scientific classification
- Kingdom: Animalia
- Phylum: Arthropoda
- Clade: Pancrustacea
- Class: Insecta
- Order: Coleoptera
- Suborder: Polyphaga
- Infraorder: Scarabaeiformia
- Family: Scarabaeidae
- Genus: Myodermum
- Species: M. variegatum

Binomial name
- Myodermum variegatum Ricchiardi & Gill, 2009

Species of beetle

Myodermum variegatum is a species of beetle of the family Scarabaeidae. It is found in Cameroon.

== Description ==
Adults reach a length of about 13.7 mm (0.54 in). They have a brownish, glabrous, moderately shiny body. The elytra are black with arcuate orange spots basally and longitudinal spots apically.
