= Eriopeltastes giganteus =

Scientific classification
- Kingdom: Animalia
- Phylum: Arthropoda
- Clade: Pancrustacea
- Class: Insecta
- Order: Coleoptera
- Suborder: Polyphaga
- Infraorder: Scarabaeiformia
- Family: Scarabaeidae
- Genus: Eriopeltastes
- Species: E. giganteus

Binomial name
- Eriopeltastes giganteus Ricchiardi, 2017

Species of beetle

Eriopeltastes giganteus is a species of beetle of the family Scarabaeidae. It is found in Eswatini.
