= Calometopus lineosus =

Scientific classification
- Kingdom: Animalia
- Phylum: Arthropoda
- Clade: Pancrustacea
- Class: Insecta
- Order: Coleoptera
- Suborder: Polyphaga
- Infraorder: Scarabaeiformia
- Family: Scarabaeidae
- Genus: Calometopus
- Species: C. lineosus

Binomial name
- Calometopus lineosus Ricchiardi, 2001

Species of beetle

Calometopus lineosus is a species of beetle of the family Scarabaeidae. It is found in Benin, Ivory Coast and Nigeria.

== Description ==
Adults reach a length of about 9.3–10 mm (0.37–0.39 in). The body is brownish, with the head and pronotum black. They are covered with long white scales, except for the elytra and pygidium.
