= Paratrichius diversus =

Scientific classification
- Kingdom: Animalia
- Phylum: Arthropoda
- Clade: Pancrustacea
- Class: Insecta
- Order: Coleoptera
- Suborder: Polyphaga
- Infraorder: Scarabaeiformia
- Family: Scarabaeidae
- Genus: Paratrichius
- Species: P. diversus

Binomial name
- Paratrichius diversus Ricchiardi, 2018

Species of beetle

Paratrichius diversus is a species of beetle of the family Scarabaeidae. It is found in Laos.

== Description ==
Adults reach a length of about 12.7 mm (0.50 in) for males and 15.7 mm (0.62 in) for females. They have an elongate body, with slender legs. They are black, with the disk of the scutellum and antennae fulvous. The legs are mixed fulvous/black and the elytra have a fulvous band around the margins. There is pale yellowish chalky material on the body.

== Etymology ==
The species name is derived from Latin diversus (meaning different).
