= Myodermum =

Scientific classification
- Kingdom: Animalia
- Phylum: Arthropoda
- Clade: Pancrustacea
- Class: Insecta
- Order: Coleoptera
- Suborder: Polyphaga
- Infraorder: Scarabaeiformia
- Family: Scarabaeidae
- Subfamily: Cetoniinae
- Tribe: Trichiini
- Genus: Myodermum; Burmeister & Schaum, 1840

Synonyms
- Myoderma Dejean, 1836

Genus of leaf beetles

Myodermum is a genus of beetles belonging to the family Scarabaeidae.

== Species ==
- Myodermum alutaceum (Afzelius, 1817)
- Myodermum consobrinum (Kolbe, 1914)
- Myodermum fuscum (Kraatz, 1883)
- Myodermum gestroi (Kolbe, 1897)
- Myodermum grossum Burgeon, 1934
- Myodermum laevicostatum (Basilewsky, 1956)
- Myodermum latipennis (Arrow, 1941)
- Myodermum melanarium (Bourgoin, 1919)
- Myodermum mirei Antoine, 2008
- Myodermum nigerrinum Ricchiardi & Gill, 2009
- Myodermum nigricollis (Moser, 1926)
- Myodermum nigrum (Arrow, 1901)
- Myodermum pusillum (Arrow, 1906)
- Myodermum ruficollis (Kraatz, 1883)
- Myodermum rufipennis Gestro, 1881
- Myodermum rufum (Waterhouse, 1885)
- Myodermum striatum (Arrow, 1941)
- Myodermum tibialis (Burgeon, 1946)
- Myodermum variegatum Ricchiardi & Gill, 2009
