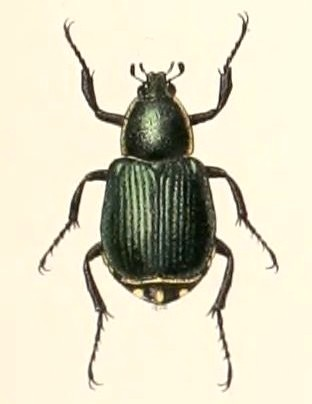

Scientific classification
- Kingdom: Animalia
- Phylum: Arthropoda
- Clade: Pancrustacea
- Class: Insecta
- Order: Coleoptera
- Suborder: Polyphaga
- Infraorder: Scarabaeiformia
- Family: Scarabaeidae
- Subfamily: Cetoniinae
- Tribe: Trichiini
- Genus: Indognorimus; Krikken, 2009
- Species: I. costipennis

Binomial name
- Indognorimus costipennis (Janson, 1890)

= Indognorimus =

Genus of beetles

Indognorimus costipennis is a species of scarab beetle in the subfamily Cetoniinae. It is the only species in the genus Indognorimus.

It is found in Assam, northern India.
