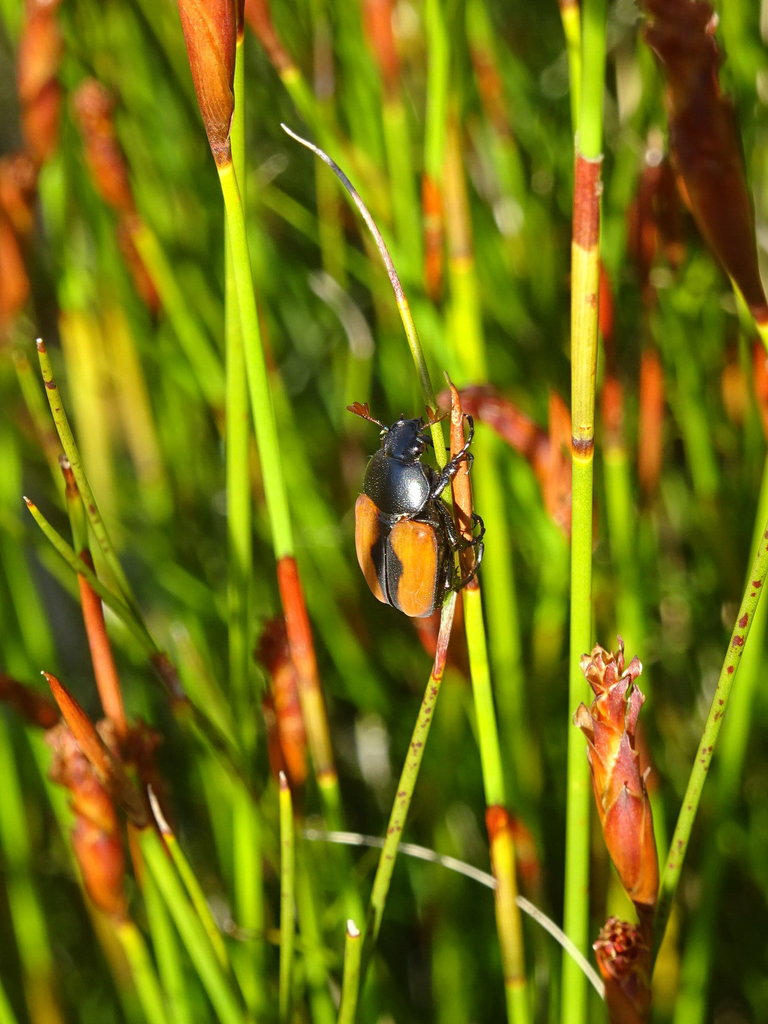

Scientific classification
- Kingdom: Animalia
- Phylum: Arthropoda
- Clade: Pancrustacea
- Class: Insecta
- Order: Coleoptera
- Suborder: Polyphaga
- Infraorder: Scarabaeiformia
- Family: Scarabaeidae
- Genus: Breviclypeus
- Species: B. rufipennis

Binomial name
- Breviclypeus rufipennis (Gory & Percheron, 1833)

Synonyms
- Agenius rufipennis Gory & Percheron, 1833

= Breviclypeus rufipennis =

Species of beetle

Breviclypeus rufipennis is a species of beetle of the family Scarabaeidae. It is found in South Africa (Western Cape).

== Description ==
Adults reach a length of about 9.5–10 mm (0.37–0.39 in) for males and 12 mm (0.47 in) for females. They are black and glabrous, with flavescent antennae, and pale yellow to reddish elytra without a black margin but with a black sutural band.
