= Breviclypeus plagosus =

Scientific classification
- Kingdom: Animalia
- Phylum: Arthropoda
- Clade: Pancrustacea
- Class: Insecta
- Order: Coleoptera
- Suborder: Polyphaga
- Infraorder: Scarabaeiformia
- Family: Scarabaeidae
- Genus: Breviclypeus
- Species: B. plagosus

Binomial name
- Breviclypeus plagosus (Péringuey, 1907)

Synonyms
- Agenius plagosus Péringuey, 1885

Species of beetle

Breviclypeus plagosus is a species of beetle of the family Scarabaeidae. It is found in South Africa (Mpumalanga, KwaZulu-Natal, Western Cape, Eastern Cape).

== Description ==
Adults reach a length of about 11–11.5 mm (0.43–0.45 in). Males are black and glabrous, with flavescent antennae, and pale yellow to reddish elytra with a black margin and a broad sutural band. Females are also black and glabrous, but occasionally with the humeral umbones faintly reddish-brown.
