= Calometopus similis =

Scientific classification
- Kingdom: Animalia
- Phylum: Arthropoda
- Clade: Pancrustacea
- Class: Insecta
- Order: Coleoptera
- Suborder: Polyphaga
- Infraorder: Scarabaeiformia
- Family: Scarabaeidae
- Genus: Calometopus
- Species: C. similis

Binomial name
- Calometopus similis Ricchiardi, 2001

Species of beetle

Calometopus similis is a species of beetle of the family Scarabaeidae. It is found in the Democratic Republic of the Congo.

== Description ==
Adults reach a length of about 9.8 mm (0.39 in). The body is black and shiny, while the elytra are mostly dark orange.
