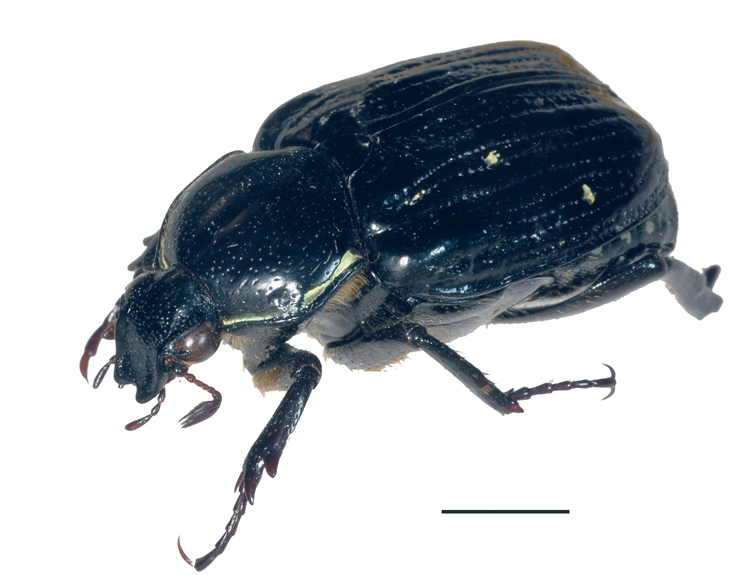

Scientific classification
- Kingdom: Animalia
- Phylum: Arthropoda
- Clade: Pancrustacea
- Class: Insecta
- Order: Coleoptera
- Suborder: Polyphaga
- Infraorder: Scarabaeiformia
- Family: Scarabaeidae
- Genus: Giesbertiolus
- Species: G. linnaei

Binomial name
- Giesbertiolus linnaei Krikken, 2008

= Giesbertiolus linnaei =

Species of beetle

Giesbertiolus linnaei is a species of scarab beetle belonging to the subfamily Cetoniinae. It is endemic to Costa Rica.

== Description ==
The species was first described in 2008 from a single female specimen collected in Costa Rica in 1895 by Oliver E. Janson. Janson thought it may belong to the genus Gnorimus, other experts who observed the specimen disagreed and labelled it Iridognorimus. It was not formally described at the time in the hope that more specimens, particularly a male, would be found and more data would be available. Recently it was hoped that the publication of a formal description would help in the location of a male to verify whether it belongs to Giesbertiolus or if a new genus should be assigned.

== Appearance ==
Krikken noted that the specimen was similar in appearance to the genus Giesbertiolus described in 1988 but slightly larger, with a body length of 21 mm (0.83 in) (other Giesbertiolus species are reported as being 10 to 15 mm (0.39 to 0.59 in)). It has an almost complete set of punctate elytral striae and a slightly raised interstriae. The body and head are black and shiny with iridescent, greenish white markings and small punctures; the appendages on the head are brownish in colour. There is an abundance of fine pale yellow hair on the ventral side and some on the dorsal side.
