= Glaphyronyx =

Scientific classification
- Kingdom: Animalia
- Phylum: Arthropoda
- Clade: Pancrustacea
- Class: Insecta
- Order: Coleoptera
- Suborder: Polyphaga
- Infraorder: Scarabaeiformia
- Family: Scarabaeidae
- Subfamily: Cetoniinae
- Tribe: Trichiini
- Genus: Glaphyronyx; Moser, 1924

Genus of leaf beetles

Glaphyronyx is a genus of beetles belonging to the family Scarabaeidae.

== Species ==
- Glaphyronyx bayeri Moser, 1924
- Glaphyronyx kenyensis (Arrow, 1941)
- Glaphyronyx kinangopinus Burgeon, 1946
- Glaphyronyx luluensis Antoine, 2006
