= Stripsipher braunsi =

Scientific classification
- Kingdom: Animalia
- Phylum: Arthropoda
- Clade: Pancrustacea
- Class: Insecta
- Order: Coleoptera
- Suborder: Polyphaga
- Infraorder: Scarabaeiformia
- Family: Scarabaeidae
- Genus: Stripsipher
- Species: S. braunsi

Binomial name
- Stripsipher braunsi Ricchiardi, 1998

Species of beetle

Stripsipher braunsi is a species of beetle of the family Scarabaeidae. It is found in South Africa (Western Cape, Eastern Cape).

== Description ==
Adults reach a length of about 10.5 mm (0.41 in). The head is black, glabrous and closely punctured. The pronotum is black, glabrous and shining with rounded, deep punctures. The elytra are testaceous, glabrous and shining, with a black area that joins the suture on the disc and a black area at the hind margin, as well as a black outer margin.

== Etymology ==
The species is dedicated to Dr. Brauns who collected most of the specimens in 1921.
