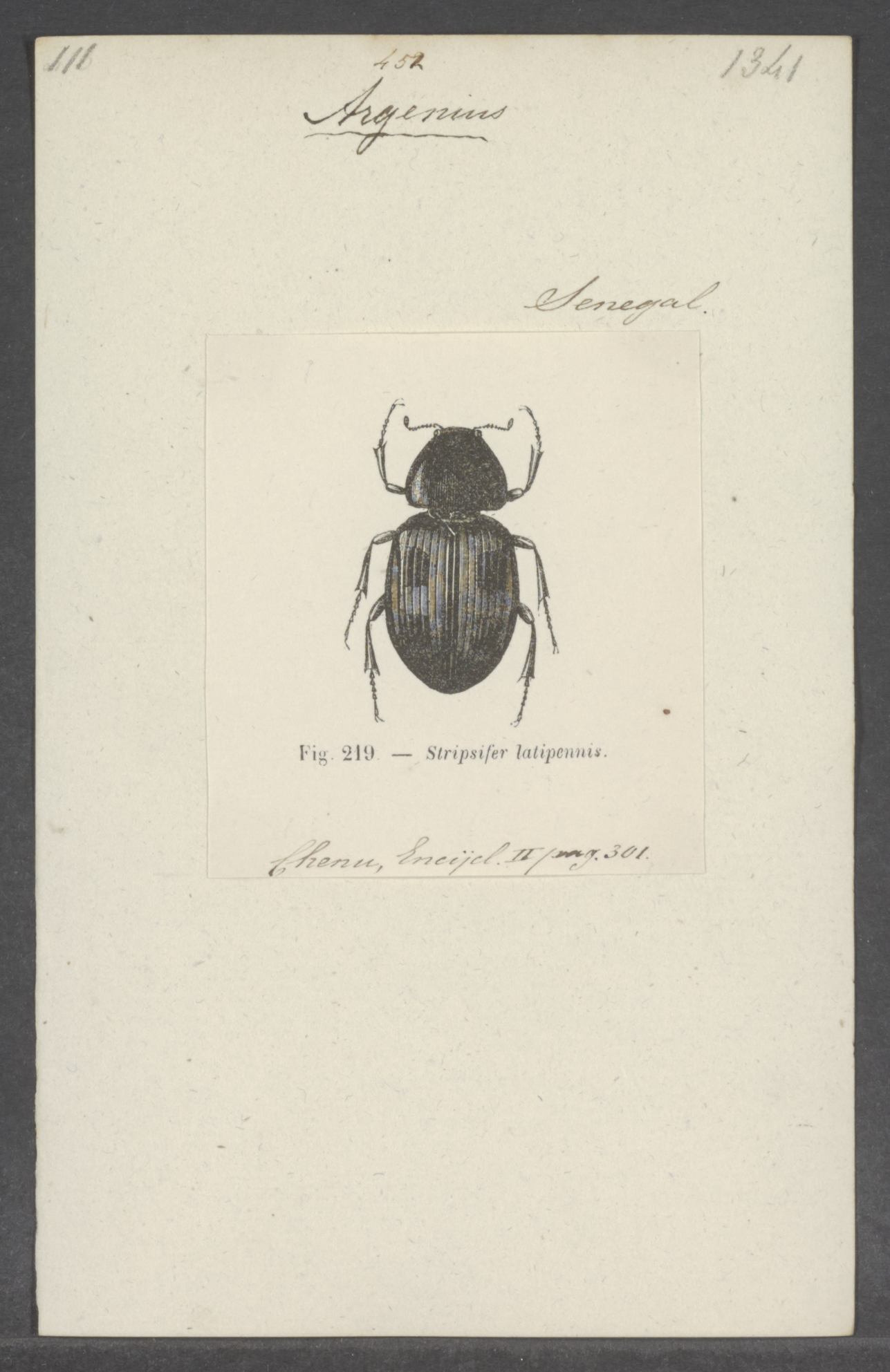

Scientific classification
- Kingdom: Animalia
- Phylum: Arthropoda
- Clade: Pancrustacea
- Class: Insecta
- Order: Coleoptera
- Suborder: Polyphaga
- Infraorder: Scarabaeiformia
- Family: Scarabaeidae
- Genus: Stripsipher
- Species: S. latipennis

Binomial name
- Stripsipher latipennis Blanchard, 1850

= Stripsipher latipennis =

Species of beetle

Stripsipher latipennis is a species of beetle of the family Scarabaeidae. It is found in Senegal.
