= Eriopeltastes =

Scientific classification
- Kingdom: Animalia
- Phylum: Arthropoda
- Clade: Pancrustacea
- Class: Insecta
- Order: Coleoptera
- Suborder: Polyphaga
- Infraorder: Scarabaeiformia
- Family: Scarabaeidae
- Subfamily: Cetoniinae
- Tribe: Trichiini
- Genus: Eriopeltastes; Burmeister & Schaum, 1840

Synonyms
- Diploeida Péringuey, 1907

Genus of leaf beetles

Eriopeltastes is a genus of beetles belonging to the family Scarabaeidae.

== Species ==
- Subgenus Eriopeltastes
  - Eriopeltastes clennelli Ricchiardi, 1999
  - Eriopeltastes evansi Ricchiardi, 1997
  - Eriopeltastes giganteus Ricchiardi, 2017
  - Eriopeltastes leucoprymnus Burmeister & Schaum, 1840
  - Eriopeltastes lineatus Ricchiardi, 1997
  - Eriopeltastes maculatus Ricchiardi, 1999
  - Eriopeltastes modestus (Péringuey, 1907)
  - Eriopeltastes montanus Ricchiardi, 1997
  - Eriopeltastes natalensis (Péringuey, 1907)
  - Eriopeltastes ntinini Ricchiardi & Perissinotto, 2013
  - Eriopeltastes ornatus Ricchiardi & Perissinotto, 2014
  - Eriopeltastes perissinottoi Ricchiardi, 1999
- Subgenus Parapeltastes Ricchiardi, Perissinotto & Clennell, 2004
  - Eriopeltastes clarki Ricchiardi, Perissinotto & Clennell, 2004
