= Indotrichius vietnamensis =

Scientific classification
- Kingdom: Animalia
- Phylum: Arthropoda
- Clade: Pancrustacea
- Class: Insecta
- Order: Coleoptera
- Suborder: Polyphaga
- Infraorder: Scarabaeiformia
- Family: Scarabaeidae
- Genus: Indotrichius
- Species: I. vietnamensis

Binomial name
- Indotrichius vietnamensis Ricchiardi, 2017

Species of beetle

Indotrichius vietnamensis is a species of beetle of the family Scarabaeidae. It is found in Vietnam.

== Description ==
Adults reach a length of about 11.7 mm (0.46 in). The dorsal surface is dull, green and dark orange, with cretaceous white markings. The pronotum is opaque-metallic green, laterally covered with long, scattered, testaceous setae.

== Etymology ==
The species name refers to the collecting country.
