= Diploa proles =

Scientific classification
- Kingdom: Animalia
- Phylum: Arthropoda
- Clade: Pancrustacea
- Class: Insecta
- Order: Coleoptera
- Suborder: Polyphaga
- Infraorder: Scarabaeiformia
- Family: Scarabaeidae
- Genus: Diploa
- Species: D. proles

Binomial name
- Diploa proles Kolbe, 1892

Species of beetle

Diploa proles is a species of beetle of the family Scarabaeidae. It is found in Tanzania.

== Description ==
Adults reach a length of about 12.5–13 mm (0.49–0.51 in). They are dark chestnut-brown, with the antennae flavescent. The clypeus is as long as the head, and, like the head, covered with contiguous, sub-scabrose punctures from which spring minute, somewhat scattered, fulvous hairs. The pronotum is covered with contiguous, scabrose punctures divided by a very thin, sharp wall, which gives them a shagreened appearance. From these punctures spring sparse, minute, fulvous hairs, but the outer margin is fringed with moderately long fulvous hairs. In females, there is a median, anterior smooth line, which is occasionally obliterated. The elytra are covered with scabrose, contiguous punctures, bearing each a minute, fulvous hair. The pygidium and underside are closely punctate and clothed, like the legs, with a long, fulvous pubescence.
