= Calometopus obscuratus =

Scientific classification
- Kingdom: Animalia
- Phylum: Arthropoda
- Clade: Pancrustacea
- Class: Insecta
- Order: Coleoptera
- Suborder: Polyphaga
- Infraorder: Scarabaeiformia
- Family: Scarabaeidae
- Genus: Calometopus
- Species: C. obscuratus

Binomial name
- Calometopus obscuratus Ricchiardi, 2001

Species of beetle

Calometopus obscuratus is a species of beetle of the family Scarabaeidae. It is found in Equatorial Guinea and Senegal.

== Description ==
Adults reach a length of about 14.2 mm (0.56 in). The body is black and mostly opaque, while the elytra are mostly brown and opaque.
