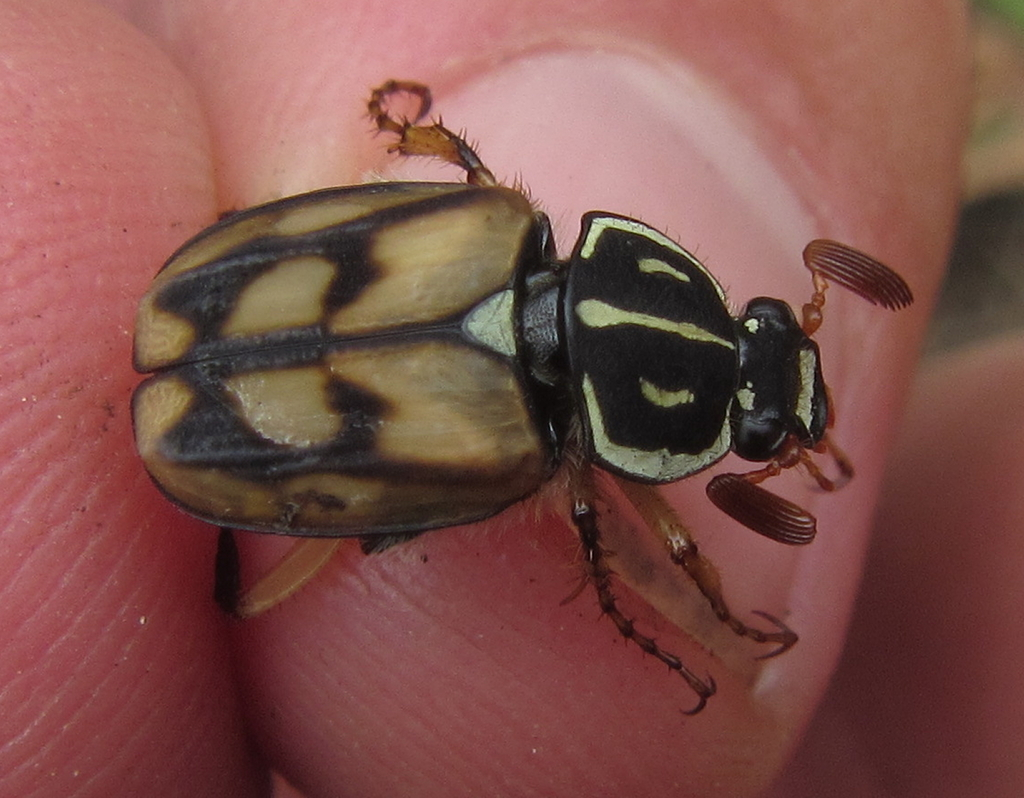

Scientific classification
- Kingdom: Animalia
- Phylum: Arthropoda
- Clade: Pancrustacea
- Class: Insecta
- Order: Coleoptera
- Suborder: Polyphaga
- Infraorder: Scarabaeiformia
- Family: Scarabaeidae
- Genus: Stripsipher
- Species: S. lamellatus

Binomial name
- Stripsipher lamellatus Ricchiardi, Perissinotto & Clennell, 2008

= Stripsipher lamellatus =

Species of beetle

Stripsipher lamellatus is a species of beetle of the family Scarabaeidae. It is found in South Africa (KwaZulu-Natal).

== Description ==
Adults reach a length of about 11 mm (0.43 in). The head is black with a fringe of long, scattered, ochraceous hairs at the anterior margin and testaceous antennae. The pronotum is black, the borders covered by a wide strip of white tomentum. The elytra are glabrous and testaceous, with black markings.
