= Eriopeltastes lineatus =

Scientific classification
- Kingdom: Animalia
- Phylum: Arthropoda
- Clade: Pancrustacea
- Class: Insecta
- Order: Coleoptera
- Suborder: Polyphaga
- Infraorder: Scarabaeiformia
- Family: Scarabaeidae
- Genus: Eriopeltastes
- Species: E. lineatus

Binomial name
- Eriopeltastes lineatus Ricchiardi, 1997

Species of beetle

Eriopeltastes lineatus is a species of beetle of the family Scarabaeidae. It is found in South Africa (KwaZulu-Natal), where it is only known from a few high altitude localities in the southern and central Drakensberg, namely Cobham, Giants Castle and Mdedelelo.
