= Paratrichius svevae =

Scientific classification
- Kingdom: Animalia
- Phylum: Arthropoda
- Clade: Pancrustacea
- Class: Insecta
- Order: Coleoptera
- Suborder: Polyphaga
- Infraorder: Scarabaeiformia
- Family: Scarabaeidae
- Genus: Paratrichius
- Species: P. svevae

Binomial name
- Paratrichius svevae Ricchiardi, 2026

Species of beetle

Paratrichius svevae is a species of beetle of the family Scarabaeidae. It is found in China (Xizang).

== Description ==
Adults reach a length of about 14.3 mm (0.56 in) for males and 16.5 mm (0.65 in) for females. They are black, with the antennae brownish and the elytra fulvous with black margins and two black spots. The centre of the scutellum is fulvous. The head, pygidium and legs are shiny, while the pronotum, scutellum and elytra are dull. There is a pale yellow chalky pattern on the body.

== Etymology ==
The species is dedicated to Sveva, the granddaughter of the author.
