= Eriopeltastes leucoprymnus =

Scientific classification
- Kingdom: Animalia
- Phylum: Arthropoda
- Clade: Pancrustacea
- Class: Insecta
- Order: Coleoptera
- Suborder: Polyphaga
- Infraorder: Scarabaeiformia
- Family: Scarabaeidae
- Genus: Eriopeltastes
- Species: E. leucoprymnus

Binomial name
- Eriopeltastes leucoprymnus Burmeister & Schaum, 1840

Species of beetle

Brachagenius pictipennis is a species of beetle of the family Scarabaeidae. It is found in South Africa (KwaZulu-Natal, Mpumalanga).

== Description ==
Adults reach a length of about 3.75 mm (0.148 in). They are black, with a flavous pubescence. The antennae, palpi, anterior tibiae and tarsi, median tarsi and elytra are yellowish fulvous and the pygidium is greyish white.
