= Calometopus werneri =

Scientific classification
- Kingdom: Animalia
- Phylum: Arthropoda
- Clade: Pancrustacea
- Class: Insecta
- Order: Coleoptera
- Suborder: Polyphaga
- Infraorder: Scarabaeiformia
- Family: Scarabaeidae
- Genus: Calometopus
- Species: C. werneri

Binomial name
- Calometopus werneri Ricchiardi, 2019

Species of beetle

Calometopus werneri is a species of beetle of the family Scarabaeidae. It is found in Tanzania.

== Description ==
Adults reach a length of about 12.3–14.1 mm (0.48–0.56 in). The head (including antennae) is black and slightly shining. The pronotum is black, shining and covered with large, scattered punctures and scattered whitish setae that form eight tufts on the disc. The elytra are dark testaceous, shining and glabrous with black lateral margins.

== Etymology ==
The species is dedicated to the entomologist Karl Werner.
