= Paratrichius humilis =

Scientific classification
- Kingdom: Animalia
- Phylum: Arthropoda
- Clade: Pancrustacea
- Class: Insecta
- Order: Coleoptera
- Suborder: Polyphaga
- Infraorder: Scarabaeiformia
- Family: Scarabaeidae
- Genus: Paratrichius
- Species: P. humilis

Binomial name
- Paratrichius humilis Ricchiardi, 2024

Species of beetle

Paratrichius humilis is a species of beetle of the family Scarabaeidae. It is found in Myanmar.

== Description ==
Adults reach a length of about 9.8 mm (0.39 in). The head is black and dull and the pronotum is black, dull and mostly glabrous (except for some long, fulvous setae at the corners) and with some chalky lines on the surface. The elytra are also black and dull, each with three chalky spots.

== Etymology ==
The species name is derived from Latin humilis and refers to its modest appearance.
