= Stripsipher superbus =

Scientific classification
- Kingdom: Animalia
- Phylum: Arthropoda
- Clade: Pancrustacea
- Class: Insecta
- Order: Coleoptera
- Suborder: Polyphaga
- Infraorder: Scarabaeiformia
- Family: Scarabaeidae
- Genus: Stripsipher
- Species: S. superbus

Binomial name
- Stripsipher superbus Ricchiardi, Perissinotto & Clennell, 2008

Species of beetle

Stripsipher superbus is a species of beetle of the family Scarabaeidae. It is found in South Africa (KwaZulu-Natal).

== Description ==
Adults reach a length of about 12.7–14.2 mm (0.50–0.56 in). The head is black with testaceous antennae. The pronotum is black and shiny, with the sides covered by a large strip of yellowish tomentum and with a second yellowish tomentum strip parallel to side strip, as well as a yellowish tomentum spot. The elytra are glabrous and orange, with the posterior third black.
