= Paratrichius danghaidangi =

Scientific classification
- Kingdom: Animalia
- Phylum: Arthropoda
- Clade: Pancrustacea
- Class: Insecta
- Order: Coleoptera
- Suborder: Polyphaga
- Infraorder: Scarabaeiformia
- Family: Scarabaeidae
- Genus: Paratrichius
- Species: P. danghaidangi

Binomial name
- Paratrichius danghaidangi Ricchiardi, 2026

Species of beetle

Paratrichius danghaidangi is a species of beetle of the family Scarabaeidae. It is found in Vietnam and China (Yunnan).

== Description ==
Adults reach a length of about 15.1 mm (0.59 in) for males and 15.2 mm (0.60 in) for females. They are black, with the antennae reddish-brown and the elytra mostly fulvous with three black spots. The scutellum is fulvous with blackish margins. The head and legs are shiny, while the pronotum, scutellum, elytra and pygidium are dull. There are several pale yellow chalky spots on the body.

== Etymology ==
The species is dedicated to Dang Hai Dang, son of the second author Dang Ngoc Van.
