= Paratrichius dangngocvani =

Scientific classification
- Kingdom: Animalia
- Phylum: Arthropoda
- Clade: Pancrustacea
- Class: Insecta
- Order: Coleoptera
- Suborder: Polyphaga
- Infraorder: Scarabaeiformia
- Family: Scarabaeidae
- Genus: Paratrichius
- Species: P. dangngocvani

Binomial name
- Paratrichius dangngocvani Ricchiardi, 2018

Species of beetle

Paratrichius dangngocvani is a species of beetle of the family Scarabaeidae. It is found in Vietnam.

== Description ==
Adults reach a length of about 11.7 mm (0.46 in). They have an elongate body, with slender legs. They are black, with the disk of scutellum dark fulvous and with the legs mixed dark fulvous/black. The elytra have a dark fulvous band at the margins. There is pale yellowish chalky material on the body.

== Etymology ==
The species is named after its collector, Mr. Dang Ngoc Van.
