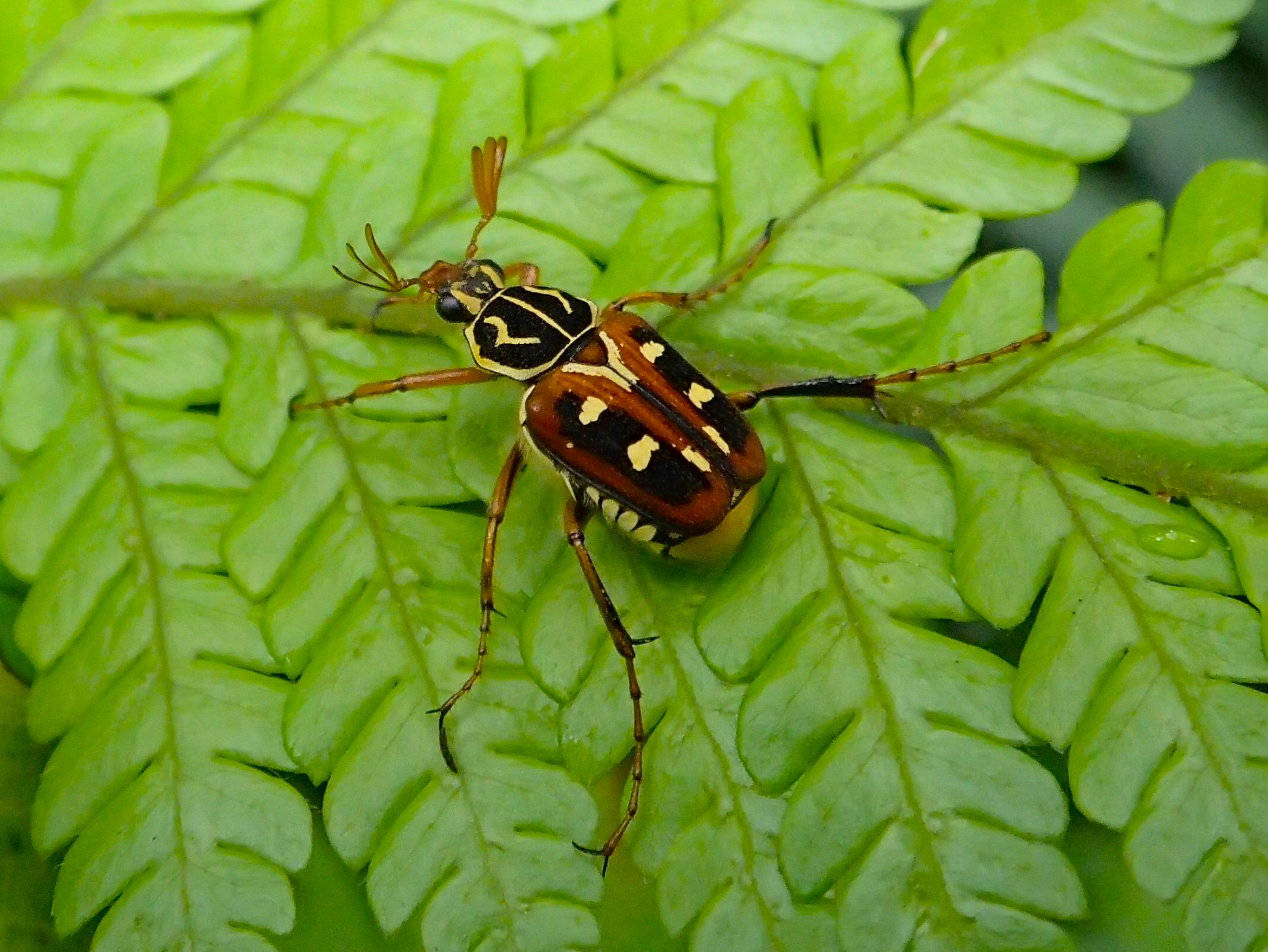
- Paratrichius duplicatus ♂ (Japan)

Scientific classification
- Kingdom: Animalia
- Phylum: Arthropoda
- Clade: Pancrustacea
- Class: Insecta
- Order: Coleoptera
- Suborder: Polyphaga
- Infraorder: Scarabaeiformia
- Family: Scarabaeidae
- Subfamily: Cetoniinae
- Tribe: Trichiini
- Genus: Paratrichius; Janson, 1881

= Paratrichius =

Genus of leaf beetles

Paratrichius is a genus of beetles belonging to the family Scarabaeidae.

== Species ==
- Paratrichius adornatus Ricchiardi, 2019
- Paratrichius akane Miyake & Yamaya, 1999
- Paratrichius alboguttatus (Moser, 1905)
- Paratrichius albolineatus Krajčik, 2007
- Paratrichius alexisi Krajčik, 2007
- Paratrichius aliceae Ricchiardi, 2026
- Paratrichius bartolozzii Ricchiardi, 2020
- Paratrichius becvari Krajčik, 2010
- Paratrichius campagnei (Bourgoin, 1917)
- Paratrichius caobangi Ricchiardi, 2020
- Paratrichius castanus Ma, 1992
- Paratrichius circularis Ma, 1990
- Paratrichius coopertus Ricchiardi, 2018
- Paratrichius cruentus (Moser, 1901)
- Paratrichius danghaidangi Ricchiardi, 2026
- Paratrichius dangngocvani Ricchiardi, 2018
- Paratrichius dangvanboi Ricchiardi, 2020
- Paratrichius discolor (Jordan, 1895)
- Paratrichius diversicolor (Bourgoin, 1915)
- Paratrichius diversus Ricchiardi, 2018
- Paratrichius doenitzi (Harold, 1879)
- Paratrichius duplicatus Lewis, 1895
- Paratrichius elegantulus (Moser, 1901)
- Paratrichius festivus (Arrow, 1910)
- Paratrichius flavipes (Moser, 1901)
- Paratrichius fujiokae Iwase, 2005
- Paratrichius guttatus Iwase, 1993
- Paratrichius hajeki Krajčik, 2010
- Paratrichius hatay Miyake, 1989
- Paratrichius humilis Ricchiardi, 2024
- Paratrichius inexpectatus Ricchiardi, 2020
- Paratrichius inscriptus (Arrow, 1938)
- Paratrichius iwasei Kobayashi & Fujioka, 2013
- Paratrichius jansoni (Gestro, 1891)
- Paratrichius kucerai Krajčik, 2007
- Paratrichius lamdongensis Kobayashi, Fujioka & Lien, 2019
- Paratrichius laoticus Krajčik, 2012
- Paratrichius loi Kobayashi & Tanikado, 2003
- Paratrichius malaisei (Arrow, 1938)
- Paratrichius marmoreus (Moser, 1901)
- Paratrichius meridionalis Iwase, 1993
- Paratrichius nepalensis Ricchiardi, 2018
- Paratrichius nicoudi (Bourgoin, 1920)
- Paratrichius nigridorsis Kobayashi & Fujioka, 2013
- Paratrichius nitidicauda (Arrow, 1938)
- Paratrichius nomurai Tesař, 1941
- Paratrichius oberthueri (Moser, 1903)
- Paratrichius obscurus (Ricchiardi, 1993)
- Paratrichius osimanus Chûjô, 1941
- Paratrichius parvolaetus Ricchiardi, 2020
- Paratrichius parvulus Kobayashi, Fujioka & Lien, 2019
- Paratrichius pauliani Tesař, 1941
- Paratrichius pejchai Mückstein, 2018
- Paratrichius pilosus Ricchiardi & Lu, 2022
- Paratrichius pouillaudei (Bourgoin, 1920)
- Paratrichius pulchellus Iwase, 2005
- Paratrichius pullatus (Bourgoin, 1915)
- Paratrichius ricchiardii Miyake, 2000
- Paratrichius riekoae Iwase, 1996
- Paratrichius rotundatus Ma, 1990
- Paratrichius rubrodecoratus (Tesař, 1952)
- Paratrichius rufescens Ma, 1990
- Paratrichius saetosus Ricchiardi, 2020
- Paratrichius sakaii Miyake, 2000
- Paratrichius saucius (Moser, 1901)
- Paratrichius septemdecimguttatus (Snellen Van Vollenhoven, 1864)
- Paratrichius siamicus Krajčik, 2008
- Paratrichius svevae Ricchiardi, 2026
- Paratrichius taiwanus Iwase, 1993
- Paratrichius tergorufus Ricchiardi, 2019
- Paratrichius tesari Mückstein, Xu & Qiu, 2020
- Paratrichius thibetanus (Pouillaude, 1913)
- Paratrichius tigris Iwase, 1996
- Paratrichius triguttatus Ricchiardi, 2020
- Paratrichius turnai Krajčik, 2007
- Paratrichius variiscoloratus Ricchiardi, 2020
- Paratrichius versicolor (Moser, 1901)
- Paratrichius vicinus Bourgoin, 1915
- Paratrichius vitalisi Bourgoin, 1915
- Paratrichius vittatus Sawada, 1939
- Paratrichius zideki Krajčik, 2011
- Paratrichius zonatus Ricchiardi, 2019
