= Calometopus nigerrimus =

Scientific classification
- Kingdom: Animalia
- Phylum: Arthropoda
- Clade: Pancrustacea
- Class: Insecta
- Order: Coleoptera
- Suborder: Polyphaga
- Infraorder: Scarabaeiformia
- Family: Scarabaeidae
- Genus: Calometopus
- Species: C. nigerrimus

Binomial name
- Calometopus nigerrimus Schein, 1956

Species of beetle

Calometopus nigerrimus is a species of beetle of the family Scarabaeidae. It is found in Kenya.

== Description ==
Adults reach a length of about 17 mm (0.67 in). They are glossy and deep black, with the antennae pitch black and the labial palps yellowish-brown. There are small, short tufts of white setae on the lateral margins of segments 1-3 and on the posterior margin of the propygidium. There are also small, whitish setae on the abdomen and legs.
