= Calometopus lusitaniae =

Scientific classification
- Kingdom: Animalia
- Phylum: Arthropoda
- Clade: Pancrustacea
- Class: Insecta
- Order: Coleoptera
- Suborder: Polyphaga
- Infraorder: Scarabaeiformia
- Family: Scarabaeidae
- Genus: Calometopus
- Species: C. lusitaniae

Binomial name
- Calometopus lusitaniae Bourgoin, 1917

Species of beetle

Calometopus lusitaniae is a species of beetle of the family Scarabaeidae. It is found in the Democratic Republic of the Congo and the Central African Republic.

== Description ==
Adults reach a length of about 10.5 mm (0.41 in). They have a black forehead with faint striation anddensely covered with bristly greyish hairs. The clypeus and antennae are black. The pronotum is dull, ashy-pink, densely but finely punctured on the disc, more densely on the sides, and covered with grey hairs. The elytra are reddish-brown, with some very short hairs.
