= Apeltastes =

Scientific classification
- Kingdom: Animalia
- Phylum: Arthropoda
- Clade: Pancrustacea
- Class: Insecta
- Order: Coleoptera
- Suborder: Polyphaga
- Infraorder: Scarabaeiformia
- Family: Scarabaeidae
- Subfamily: Cetoniinae
- Tribe: Trichiini
- Genus: Apeltastes; Howden, 1968

Genus of leaf beetles

Apeltastes is a genus of beetles belonging to the family Scarabaeidae.

== Species ==
- Apeltastes chiapasensis Howden, 1994
- Apeltastes elongatus Howden, 1968
