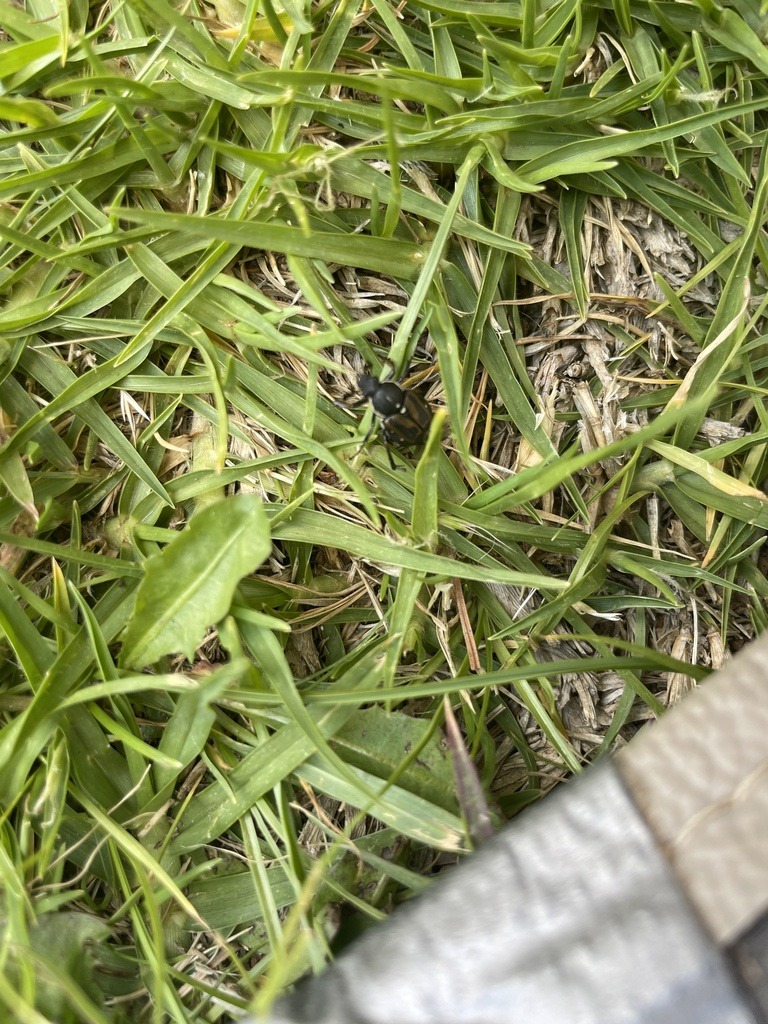

Scientific classification
- Kingdom: Animalia
- Phylum: Arthropoda
- Clade: Pancrustacea
- Class: Insecta
- Order: Coleoptera
- Suborder: Polyphaga
- Infraorder: Scarabaeiformia
- Family: Scarabaeidae
- Genus: Stripsipher
- Species: S. signatulus

Binomial name
- Stripsipher signatulus Ricchiardi, Perissinotto & Clennell, 2008

= Stripsipher signatulus =

Species of beetle

Stripsipher signatulus is a species of beetle of the family Scarabaeidae. It is found in South Africa (KwaZulu-Natal).

== Description ==
Adults reach a length of about 8.3–11.2 mm (0.33–0.44 in). The head is black, dull and glabrous and the antennae are testaceous with a black club. The pronotum is black and glabrous, with a strip of white tomentum along the lateral borders and some white tomentum spots. The elytra are glabrous and testaceous with black markings.
