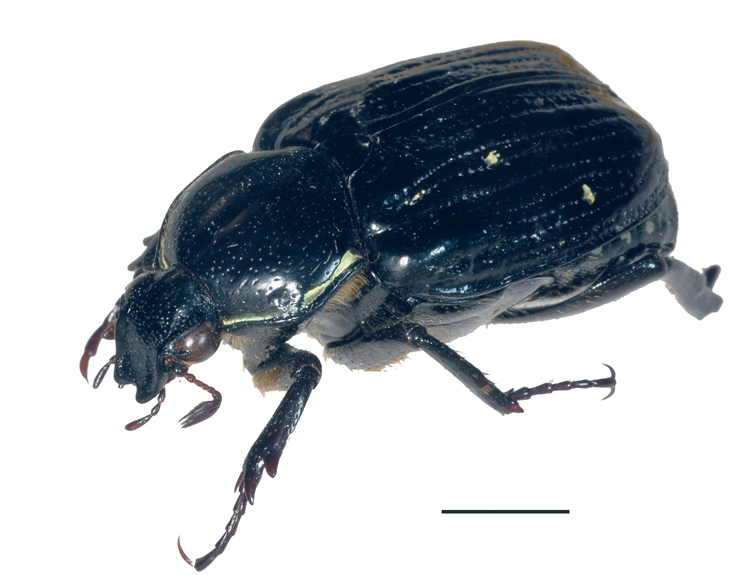
- Giesbertiolus linnaei

Scientific classification
- Kingdom: Animalia
- Phylum: Arthropoda
- Clade: Pancrustacea
- Class: Insecta
- Order: Coleoptera
- Suborder: Polyphaga
- Infraorder: Scarabaeiformia
- Family: Scarabaeidae
- Tribe: Trichiini
- Genus: Giesbertiolus; Howden, 1988

= Giesbertiolus =

Genus of beetle

Giesbertiolus is a genus of scarab beetle belonging to the subfamily Cetoniinae. It contains four species, although the placement of G. linnaei is regarded as tentative.

== Species ==
- Giesbertiolus curoei Ramirez-Ponce, 2014
- Giesbertiolus festivus (Howden, 1972)
- Giesbertiolus linnaei Krikken, 2008
- Giesbertiolus ornatus Howden, 1988
