= Breviclypeus =

Scientific classification
- Kingdom: Animalia
- Phylum: Arthropoda
- Clade: Pancrustacea
- Class: Insecta
- Order: Coleoptera
- Suborder: Polyphaga
- Infraorder: Scarabaeiformia
- Family: Scarabaeidae
- Subfamily: Cetoniinae
- Tribe: Trichiini
- Genus: Breviclypeus; Ricchiardi, 2017

Genus of leaf beetles

Breviclypeus is a genus of beetles belonging to the family Scarabaeidae.

== Species ==
- Breviclypeus plagosus (Péringuey, 1885)
- Breviclypeus rufipennis (Gory & Percheron, 1833)
