= Calometopus aranciatus =

Scientific classification
- Kingdom: Animalia
- Phylum: Arthropoda
- Clade: Pancrustacea
- Class: Insecta
- Order: Coleoptera
- Suborder: Polyphaga
- Infraorder: Scarabaeiformia
- Family: Scarabaeidae
- Genus: Calometopus
- Species: C. aranciatus

Binomial name
- Calometopus aranciatus Ricchiardi, 2001

Species of beetle

Calometopus aranciatus is a species of beetle of the family Scarabaeidae. It is found in the Democratic Republic of the Congo and Uganda.

== Description ==
Adults reach a length of about 12 mm (0.47 in). The body is black and glabrous, with the front and lateral margins of the pronotum and most of the elytra orange.
