= Clastocnemis =

Scientific classification
- Kingdom: Animalia
- Phylum: Arthropoda
- Clade: Pancrustacea
- Class: Insecta
- Order: Coleoptera
- Suborder: Polyphaga
- Infraorder: Scarabaeiformia
- Family: Scarabaeidae
- Subfamily: Cetoniinae
- Tribe: Trichiini
- Genus: Clastocnemis; Burmeister, 1840

Genus of leaf beetles

Clastocnemis is a genus of beetles belonging to the family Scarabaeidae.

== Species ==
- Clastocnemis colini Moser, 1918
- Clastocnemis distinctus Antoine, 2005
- Clastocnemis mirei Antoine, 1998
- Clastocnemis muelleri Burgeon, 1946
- Clastocnemis nigritulus (Burgeon, 1934)
- Clastocnemis quadrimaculatus (Afzelius, 1817)
- Clastocnemis simulator (Burgeon, 1934)
- Clastocnemis simulus Janson, 1885
- Clastocnemis tabaccoi (Burgeon, 1935)
