= Paratrichius zonatus =

Scientific classification
- Kingdom: Animalia
- Phylum: Arthropoda
- Clade: Pancrustacea
- Class: Insecta
- Order: Coleoptera
- Suborder: Polyphaga
- Infraorder: Scarabaeiformia
- Family: Scarabaeidae
- Genus: Paratrichius
- Species: P. zonatus

Binomial name
- Paratrichius zonatus Ricchiardi, 2019

Species of beetle

Paratrichius zonatus is a species of beetle of the family Scarabaeidae. It is found in China (Guangxi).

== Description ==
Adults reach a length of about 11.3–13.6 mm (0.44–0.54 in). They have an elongate body, with slender legs. The head is black with the clypeus and antennae fulvous. The pronotum is black and covered with black pruinosity. The margins have scattered, fulvous setae and there is pale yellow, chalky material on the surface. The elytra are black, with fulvous areas and with pale yellow chalky material on the surface.
