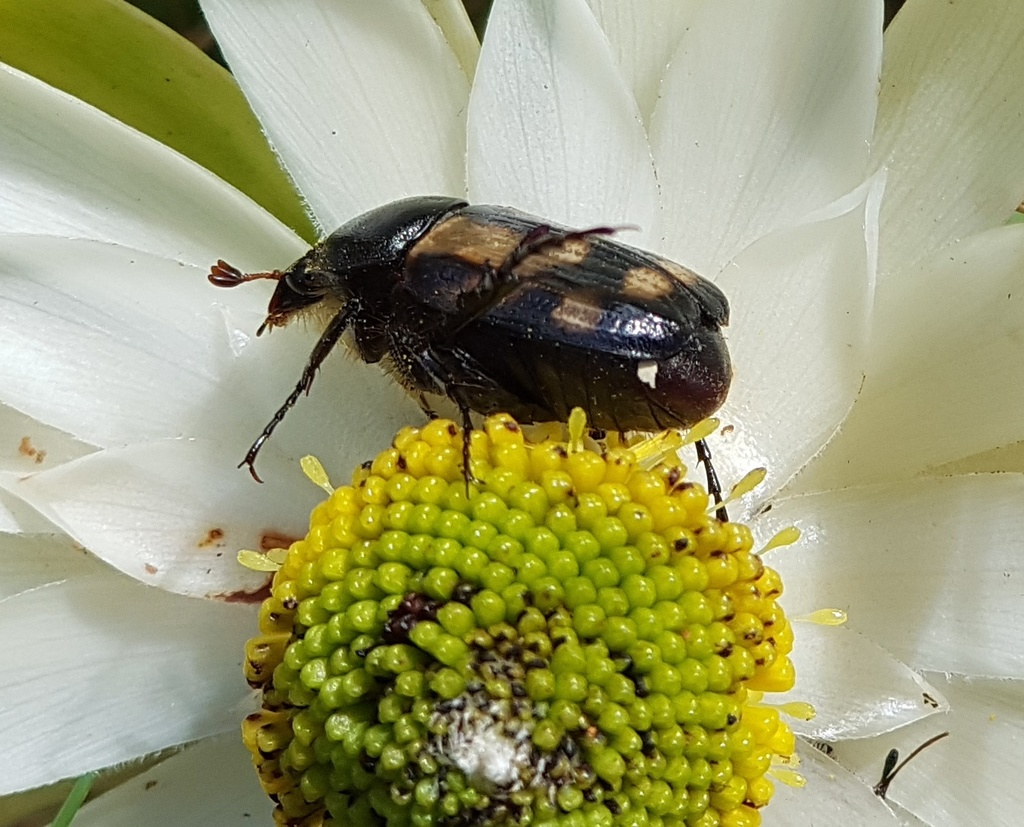

Scientific classification
- Kingdom: Animalia
- Phylum: Arthropoda
- Clade: Pancrustacea
- Class: Insecta
- Order: Coleoptera
- Suborder: Polyphaga
- Infraorder: Scarabaeiformia
- Family: Scarabaeidae
- Genus: Stripsipher
- Species: S. turneri

Binomial name
- Stripsipher turneri Arrow, 1926

= Stripsipher turneri =

Species of beetle

Stripsipher turneri is a species of beetle of the family Scarabaeidae. It is found in South Africa (Eastern Cape, KwaZulu-Natal).
