= Campulipus =

Scientific classification
- Kingdom: Animalia
- Phylum: Arthropoda
- Clade: Pancrustacea
- Class: Insecta
- Order: Coleoptera
- Suborder: Polyphaga
- Infraorder: Scarabaeiformia
- Family: Scarabaeidae
- Subfamily: Cetoniinae
- Tribe: Trichiini
- Genus: Campulipus; Kirby, 1827

Synonyms
- Strigifer Burmeister & Schaum, 1846; Campylipus Laporte, 1840; Trichius (Stringophorus) Burmeister & Schaum, 1840; Agenius Le Peletier de Saint-Fargeau & Audinet-Serville, 1828

Genus of leaf beetles

Campulipus is a genus of beetles belonging to the family Scarabaeidae.

== Species ==
- Campulipus clavus (Schaum, 1844)
- Campulipus limbatus (Olivier, 1789)
- Campulipus suturalis (Waterhouse, 1885)
