= Campulipus clavus =

Scientific classification
- Kingdom: Animalia
- Phylum: Arthropoda
- Clade: Pancrustacea
- Class: Insecta
- Order: Coleoptera
- Suborder: Polyphaga
- Infraorder: Scarabaeiformia
- Family: Scarabaeidae
- Genus: Campulipus
- Species: C. clavus

Binomial name
- Campulipus clavus (Schaum, 1844)

Synonyms
- Agenius clavus Schaum, 1844; Agenius elegans Péringuey, 1892; Agenius grandis Péringuey, 1885

Species of beetle

Campulipus clavus is a species of beetle of the family Scarabaeidae. It is found in South Africa (Western Cape).

== Description ==
Adults reach a length of about 12.5–18 mm (0.49–0.71 in). Males are black, with the elytra pale flavescent with a narrow outer marginal black band and the suture with a moderately broad black band ascending from the apex to the median part, where it sometimes expands in a short triangular patch. The clypeus is acuminate as in Campulipus limbatus, but is straight in front, and the head and pronotum are similarly shaped and sculptured, the latter has a median groove and is either moderately pubescent or almost glabrous. The elytra are not quite as narrowly elongate as in limbatus, but the sculpture is the same. The underside is moderately pubescent. Females are more elongated than males, but equally plane, and with the clypeus more attenuate laterally towards the tip, the punctures on the head and pronotum are coarser and deeper and the whole body is black. The elytra are deeply and somewhat coarsely punctate and the underside is glabrous.
