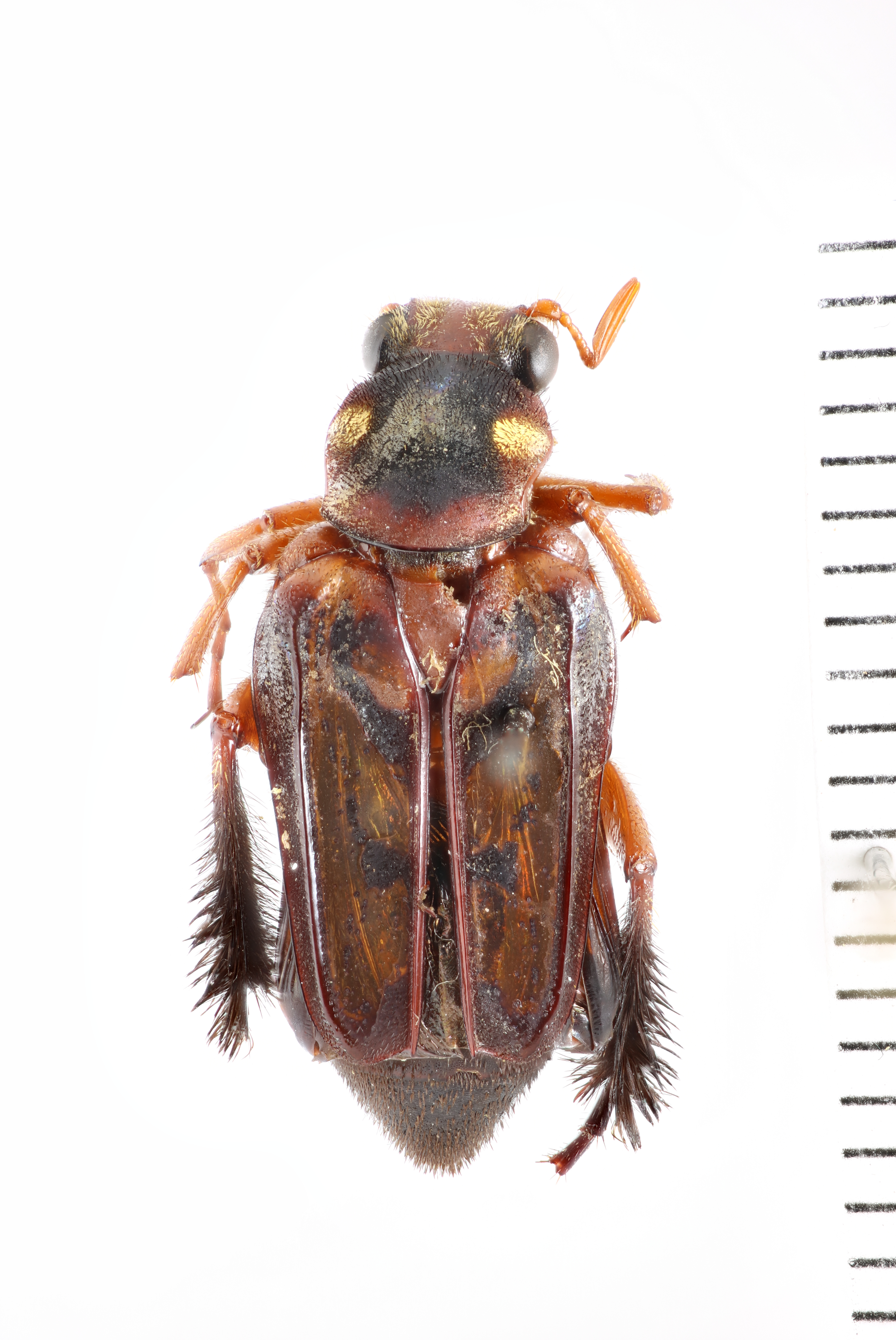

Scientific classification
- Kingdom: Animalia
- Phylum: Arthropoda
- Clade: Pancrustacea
- Class: Insecta
- Order: Coleoptera
- Suborder: Polyphaga
- Infraorder: Scarabaeiformia
- Family: Scarabaeidae
- Genus: Calometopidius
- Species: C. cavellae

Binomial name
- Calometopidius cavellae Bourgoin, 1917

= Calometopidius cavellae =

Species of beetle

Calometopidius cavellae is a species of beetle of the family Scarabaeidae. It is found in the Democratic Republic of the Congo.

== Description ==
Adults reach a length of about 13.6 mm (0.54 in). The pronotum is dull with a black disc, reddish on the margins (except anteriorly) and with fine punctation (but dense on the disc). On each side, there is a cluster of pale, golden, scale-like hairs. The elytra are golden-red and shiny.
