= Epitrichius =

Scientific classification
- Kingdom: Animalia
- Phylum: Arthropoda
- Clade: Pancrustacea
- Class: Insecta
- Order: Coleoptera
- Suborder: Polyphaga
- Infraorder: Scarabaeiformia
- Family: Scarabaeidae
- Subfamily: Cetoniinae
- Tribe: Trichiini
- Genus: Epitrichius; Tagawa, 1941

Genus of leaf beetles

Epitrichius is a genus of beetles belonging to the family Scarabaeidae.

== Species ==
- Epitrichius australis Ricchiardi, 2018
- Epitrichius bowringi (Thomson, 1857)
- Epitrichius cupreipes (Bourgoin, 1915)
- Epitrichius elegans (Kano, 1931)
- Epitrichius fraterculus (Moser, 1901)
- Epitrichius lagopus (Fairmaire, 1897)
- Epitrichius magnificus Krajčik & Chou, 2008
- Epitrichius miyagawai Kobayashi, Fujioka & Lien, 2019
- Epitrichius versutus (Krikken, 1972)
