= Paratrichius aliceae =

Scientific classification
- Kingdom: Animalia
- Phylum: Arthropoda
- Clade: Pancrustacea
- Class: Insecta
- Order: Coleoptera
- Suborder: Polyphaga
- Infraorder: Scarabaeiformia
- Family: Scarabaeidae
- Genus: Paratrichius
- Species: P. aliceae

Binomial name
- Paratrichius aliceae Ricchiardi, 2026

Species of beetle

Paratrichius aliceae is a species of beetle of the family Scarabaeidae. It is found in Vietnam.

== Description ==
Adults reach a length of about 11.7 mm (0.46 in) for males and 12.6 mm (0.50 in) for females. They are black, with the clypeus, antennae legs and lateral margins of the pronotum fulvous. The elytra are fulvous, with three black spots. The ventral surface and pygidium are shining, while the pronotum and scutellum are dull. There are several yellow chalky spots on the body.

== Etymology ==
The species is dedicated to Alice, the granddaughter of the author.
