= Eriopeltastes modestus =

Scientific classification
- Kingdom: Animalia
- Phylum: Arthropoda
- Clade: Pancrustacea
- Class: Insecta
- Order: Coleoptera
- Suborder: Polyphaga
- Infraorder: Scarabaeiformia
- Family: Scarabaeidae
- Genus: Eriopeltastes
- Species: E. modestus

Binomial name
- Eriopeltastes modestus (Péringuey, 1907)

Synonyms
- Diploeida modesta Péringuey, 1907

Species of beetle

Eriopeltastes modestus is a species of beetle of the family Scarabaeidae. It is found in north-western South Africa.

== Description ==
Adults reach a length of about 12.5 mm (0.49 in). Males are dark chestnut-brown and sub-opaque, with the antennae light chestnut. Both the head and clypeus are roughly and closely punctured. The pronotum is covered with round, shallow punctures separated from each other by a smooth space equal to their own diameter, and the outer margin has a fringe of moderately long, fulvous hairs. The elytra are coriaceous rather than punctate, and the suture is tectiform. The pygidium is glabrous and faintly punctate (except at the apex).
