= Dialithus =

Scientific classification
- Kingdom: Animalia
- Phylum: Arthropoda
- Clade: Pancrustacea
- Class: Insecta
- Order: Coleoptera
- Suborder: Polyphaga
- Infraorder: Scarabaeiformia
- Family: Scarabaeidae
- Subfamily: Cetoniinae
- Tribe: Trichiini
- Genus: Dialithus; Parry, 1849

Genus of leaf beetles

Dialithus is a genus of beetles belonging to the family Scarabaeidae.

== Species ==
- Dialithus magnificus (Parry, 1849)
- Dialithus scintillans Howden, 1972
