= Eriopeltastes natalensis =

Scientific classification
- Kingdom: Animalia
- Phylum: Arthropoda
- Clade: Pancrustacea
- Class: Insecta
- Order: Coleoptera
- Suborder: Polyphaga
- Infraorder: Scarabaeiformia
- Family: Scarabaeidae
- Genus: Eriopeltastes
- Species: E. natalensis

Binomial name
- Eriopeltastes natalensis (Péringuey, 1907)

Synonyms
- Stegopterus natalensis Péringuey, 1907

Species of beetle

Eriopeltastes natalensis is a species of beetle of the family Scarabaeidae. It is found in South Africa (KwaZulu-Natal).

== Description ==
Adults reach a length of about 10 mm (0.39 in). They are bronze-black, with the antennae and the elytra testaceous yellow, the latter have the recurved outer margin black. The clypeus is somewhat concave, rounded in front, owing to the margin being raised all round, very slightly emarginate in the centre, and densely hairy like the head. The pronotum is clothed with a very dense and long flavescent pubescence, and covered with somewhat broad, sub-contiguous punctures. Along the outer margin there is occasionally a whitish band. The scutellum is closely punctate and the elytra somewhat short, being only twice the length of the prothorax. The pygidium has a greyish-white coating leaving a median longitudinal black band beginning at a short distance from the base, but reaching the apex, and having in addition a moderately dense, long yellowish-white pubescence similar to the one clothing the under side.
