= Calometopus reichenbachi =

Scientific classification
- Kingdom: Animalia
- Phylum: Arthropoda
- Clade: Pancrustacea
- Class: Insecta
- Order: Coleoptera
- Suborder: Polyphaga
- Infraorder: Scarabaeiformia
- Family: Scarabaeidae
- Genus: Calometopus
- Species: C. reichenbachi

Binomial name
- Calometopus reichenbachi Ricchiardi, 2019

Species of beetle

Calometopus reichenbachi is a species of beetle of the family Scarabaeidae. It is found in Malawi and Tanzania.

== Description ==
Adults reach a length of about 14.1–15.5 mm (0.56–0.61 in). The head (including antennae) is black and shining. The pronotum is black, dull and covered with black pruinosity and with testaceous setae that form six small tufts on the disc. The elytra are yellowish, shining and glabrous with a comma-shaped black marking on the disc.

== Etymology ==
The species is dedicated to Andreas Reichenbach who sent specimens of this species to the author for study.
