= Calometopus hollisi =

Scientific classification
- Kingdom: Animalia
- Phylum: Arthropoda
- Clade: Pancrustacea
- Class: Insecta
- Order: Coleoptera
- Suborder: Polyphaga
- Infraorder: Scarabaeiformia
- Family: Scarabaeidae
- Genus: Calometopus
- Species: C. hollisi

Binomial name
- Calometopus hollisi Waterhouse, 1898

Synonyms
- Calometopus hollissi

Species of beetle

Calometopus hollisi is a species of beetle of the family Scarabaeidae. It is found in the Democratic Republic of the Congo and Tanzania.

== Description ==
Adults reach a length of about 13.2–16.4 mm (0.52–0.65 in). The head (including antennae) is black and slightly shining. The pronotum is reddish, dull and covered with reddish pruinosity. The elytra are yellowish, shining and glabrous with a rounded black marking on the disc.
