= Brachagenius =

Scientific classification
- Kingdom: Animalia
- Phylum: Arthropoda
- Clade: Pancrustacea
- Class: Insecta
- Order: Coleoptera
- Suborder: Polyphaga
- Infraorder: Scarabaeiformia
- Family: Scarabaeidae
- Subfamily: Cetoniinae
- Tribe: Trichiini
- Genus: Brachagenius; Kraatz, 1890

Synonyms
- Xiphoscelidus Péringuey, 1907

Genus of leaf beetles

Brachagenius is a genus of beetles belonging to the family Scarabaeidae.

== Species ==
- Brachagenius lugubris (Péringuey, 1888)
- Brachagenius oculatus Evans, 1987
- Brachagenius pictipennis Kraatz, 1890
