= Endoxazus =

Scientific classification
- Kingdom: Animalia
- Phylum: Arthropoda
- Clade: Pancrustacea
- Class: Insecta
- Order: Coleoptera
- Suborder: Polyphaga
- Infraorder: Scarabaeiformia
- Family: Scarabaeidae
- Subfamily: Cetoniinae
- Tribe: Trichiini
- Genus: Endoxazus; Bourgoin, 1917

Genus of leaf beetles

Endoxazus is a genus of beetles belonging to the family Scarabaeidae.

== Species ==
- Endoxazus conradti Kolbe, 1892
- Endoxazus kivuensis Burgeon, 1937
- Endoxazus minettii Antoine, 2009
- Endoxazus vingerhoedti Antoine, 2008
