= Glaphyronyx bayeri =

Scientific classification
- Kingdom: Animalia
- Phylum: Arthropoda
- Clade: Pancrustacea
- Class: Insecta
- Order: Coleoptera
- Suborder: Polyphaga
- Infraorder: Scarabaeiformia
- Family: Scarabaeidae
- Genus: Glaphyronyx
- Species: G. bayeri

Binomial name
- Glaphyronyx bayeri Moser, 1924

Synonyms
- Endoxazus elgonensis Arrow, 1941

Species of beetle

Glaphyronyx bayeri is a species of beetle of the family Scarabaeidae. It is found in the Democratic Republic of the Congo and Kenya.

== Description ==
Adults reach a length of about 15 mm (0.59 in). They are black and shining, with the elytra chestnut brown and the legs reddish-yellow. The frons is finely rugose-punctate, with the punctures bearing yellowish hairs. The antennae are reddish-yellow.
