= Eriopeltastes evansi =

Scientific classification
- Kingdom: Animalia
- Phylum: Arthropoda
- Clade: Pancrustacea
- Class: Insecta
- Order: Coleoptera
- Suborder: Polyphaga
- Infraorder: Scarabaeiformia
- Family: Scarabaeidae
- Genus: Eriopeltastes
- Species: E. evansi

Binomial name
- Eriopeltastes evansi Ricchiardi, 1997

Species of beetle

Eriopeltastes evansi is a species of beetle of the family Scarabaeidae. It is found in South Africa (Mpumalanga) and Eswatini.
