= Eriopeltastes ntinini =

Scientific classification
- Kingdom: Animalia
- Phylum: Arthropoda
- Clade: Pancrustacea
- Class: Insecta
- Order: Coleoptera
- Suborder: Polyphaga
- Infraorder: Scarabaeiformia
- Family: Scarabaeidae
- Genus: Eriopeltastes
- Species: E. ntinini

Binomial name
- Eriopeltastes ntinini Ricchiardi & Perissinotto, 2013

Species of beetle

Eriopeltastes ntinini is a species of beetle of the family Scarabaeidae. It is found in South Africa (KwaZulu-Natal).

== Description ==
Adults reach a length of about 11.2 mm (0.44 in). They have a black, densely punctate and shiny head, with testaceous antennae. The pronotum is black and covered with large punctures and the sides with white tomentum band. The surface is covered with testaceous setae. The scutellum is black and glabrous and the elytra are testaceous and glabrous.

== Etymology ==
The species is named after the type locality.
