= Calometopus legrandi =

Scientific classification
- Kingdom: Animalia
- Phylum: Arthropoda
- Clade: Pancrustacea
- Class: Insecta
- Order: Coleoptera
- Suborder: Polyphaga
- Infraorder: Scarabaeiformia
- Family: Scarabaeidae
- Genus: Calometopus
- Species: C. legrandi

Binomial name
- Calometopus legrandi Ricchiardi, 2015

Species of beetle

Calometopus legrandi is a species of beetle of the family Scarabaeidae. It is found in Tanzania.

== Description ==
Adults reach a length of about 16.2 mm (0.64 in). The head is castaneous and shining, with the frons and clypeus covered with large punctures. Some punctures have testaceous setae. The antennae are also castaneous and the pronotum is castaneous with blackish areas and is covered with scattered large punctures, some also containing setae. The elytra are testaceous, shining and glabrous.

== Etymology ==
The species is dedicated to the entomologist Jean-Philippe Legrand.
