= Stripsipher werneri =

Scientific classification
- Kingdom: Animalia
- Phylum: Arthropoda
- Clade: Pancrustacea
- Class: Insecta
- Order: Coleoptera
- Suborder: Polyphaga
- Infraorder: Scarabaeiformia
- Family: Scarabaeidae
- Genus: Stripsipher
- Species: S. werneri

Binomial name
- Stripsipher werneri Ricchiardi, 1998

Species of beetle

Stripsipher werneri is a species of beetle of the family Scarabaeidae. It is found in South Africa (KwaZulu-Natal).

== Description ==
Adults reach a length of about 9.2–10.9 mm (0.36–0.43 in) for males and 11.2–12.2 mm (0.44–0.48 in) for females. The head is dark metallic green, with the clypeus black, the antennae brown and the frons covered by long, yellowish hairs. The pronotum is also dark metallic green, but also glabrous and shining. The elytra are glabrous, shining and yellowish, with the suture and the outer margin black.

== Etymology ==
The species is dedicated to Karl Werner, who collected the specimens.
