= Calometopus unicolor =

Scientific classification
- Kingdom: Animalia
- Phylum: Arthropoda
- Clade: Pancrustacea
- Class: Insecta
- Order: Coleoptera
- Suborder: Polyphaga
- Infraorder: Scarabaeiformia
- Family: Scarabaeidae
- Genus: Calometopus
- Species: C. unicolor

Binomial name
- Calometopus unicolor Ricchiardi, 2001

Species of beetle

Calometopus unicolor is a species of beetle of the family Scarabaeidae. It is found in the Democratic Republic of the Congo.

== Description ==
Adults reach a length of about 12.9 mm (0.51 in). The body is black, glabrous and shiny, with the head, pronotum, elytra and pygidium mostly red.
