= Paratrichius coopertus =

Scientific classification
- Kingdom: Animalia
- Phylum: Arthropoda
- Clade: Pancrustacea
- Class: Insecta
- Order: Coleoptera
- Suborder: Polyphaga
- Infraorder: Scarabaeiformia
- Family: Scarabaeidae
- Genus: Paratrichius
- Species: P. coopertus

Binomial name
- Paratrichius coopertus Ricchiardi, 2018

Species of beetle

Paratrichius coopertus is a species of beetle of the family Scarabaeidae. It is found in Laos and Vietnam.

== Description ==
Adults reach a length of about 11.5–13.5 mm (0.45–0.53 in). They have an elongate body, with slender legs. They are black, with the legs, scutellum, antennae and clypeus fulvous, while the elytra have a fulvous band at the margins. There is pale yellowish chalky material on the body.

== Etymology ==
The species name is derived from Latin coopertus (meaning completely covered) and refers to the pygidium of the males, that is covered by yellowish chalky material.
