= Eriopeltastes perissinottoi =

Scientific classification
- Kingdom: Animalia
- Phylum: Arthropoda
- Clade: Pancrustacea
- Class: Insecta
- Order: Coleoptera
- Suborder: Polyphaga
- Infraorder: Scarabaeiformia
- Family: Scarabaeidae
- Genus: Eriopeltastes
- Species: E. perissinottoi

Binomial name
- Eriopeltastes perissinottoi Ricchiardi, 1999

Species of beetle

Eriopeltastes perissinottoi is a species of beetle of the family Scarabaeidae. It is found in South Africa (Eastern Cape).
