= Calometopidius sinemaculatus =

Scientific classification
- Kingdom: Animalia
- Phylum: Arthropoda
- Clade: Pancrustacea
- Class: Insecta
- Order: Coleoptera
- Suborder: Polyphaga
- Infraorder: Scarabaeiformia
- Family: Scarabaeidae
- Genus: Calometopidius
- Species: C. sinemaculatus

Binomial name
- Calometopidius sinemaculatus Ricchiardi, 2023

Species of beetle

Calometopidius sinemaculatus is a species of beetle of the family Scarabaeidae. It is found in Cameroon.

== Description ==
Adults reach a length of about 20.8 mm (0.82 in). The head is black and shining, covered with scattered black setae. The pronotum is black and shining and covered with large scattered punctures. The elytra are fulvous, shining and glabrous.

== Etymology ==
The species name refers to the absence of yellowish maculae on the pronotum.
