= Camapterus =

Scientific classification
- Kingdom: Animalia
- Phylum: Arthropoda
- Clade: Pancrustacea
- Class: Insecta
- Order: Coleoptera
- Suborder: Polyphaga
- Infraorder: Scarabaeiformia
- Family: Scarabaeidae
- Subfamily: Cetoniinae
- Tribe: Trichiini
- Genus: Camapterus; Ricchiardi, 2000
- Species: C. oweni

Binomial name
- Camapterus oweni Ricchiardi, 2000

Genus of beetles

Camapterus is a genus of beetle of the family Scarabaeidae. It is monotypic, being represented by the single species, Camapterus oweni, which is found in South Africa (Western Cape). Its habitat consists of semi-arid mountainous areas.

== Description ==
Adults reach a length of about 19.8–20 mm (0.78–0.79 in). They are completely black, glabrous and without white tomentum. Both the males and females are brachypterous.

== Etymology ==
The species is dedicated to Colin R. Owen, who discovered the species.
