= Stripsipher morulus =

Scientific classification
- Kingdom: Animalia
- Phylum: Arthropoda
- Clade: Pancrustacea
- Class: Insecta
- Order: Coleoptera
- Suborder: Polyphaga
- Infraorder: Scarabaeiformia
- Family: Scarabaeidae
- Genus: Stripsipher
- Species: S. morulus

Binomial name
- Stripsipher morulus (Janson, 1885)

Synonyms
- Stringophorus morulus Janson, 1885

Species of beetle

Stripsipher morulus is a species of beetle of the family Scarabaeidae. It is found in Nigeria.

== Description ==
Adults reach a length of about 15 mm (0.59 in). They are pitchy-black and shining, with the antennae and palpi pale testaceous. The apex of the anterior tibiae and anterior tarsi are reddish-brown. The head is coarsely punctured, with three shallow foveae arranged in a triangle between the striae in front. The thorax is coarsely but not very closely punctured in front, more finely punctured towards the base, with a small fovea on each side near the margin. The scutellum is finely punctured and the elytra depressed, somewhat dilated in the middle, strongly rounded at the apex, the sutural and two discal costae moderately elevated, the interstices and sides with double rows of large confluent variolose punctures, the apex irregularly strigose. The pygidium is very finely and closely strigose, a small fovea on each side near the base.
