= Calometopus hirsutus =

Scientific classification
- Kingdom: Animalia
- Phylum: Arthropoda
- Clade: Pancrustacea
- Class: Insecta
- Order: Coleoptera
- Suborder: Polyphaga
- Infraorder: Scarabaeiformia
- Family: Scarabaeidae
- Genus: Calometopus
- Species: C. hirsutus

Binomial name
- Calometopus hirsutus Burgeon, 1934

Species of beetle

Calometopus hirsutus is a species of beetle of the family Scarabaeidae. It is found in Burundi and the Democratic Republic of the Congo.

== Description ==
Adults reach a length of about 8.4 mm (0.33 in). The head is covered with thick small punctures and scattered, long black setae. The clypeus are antennae are black. The pronotum is black, slightly shiny and covered with scattered black setae. The elytra are yellowish and glabrous.
