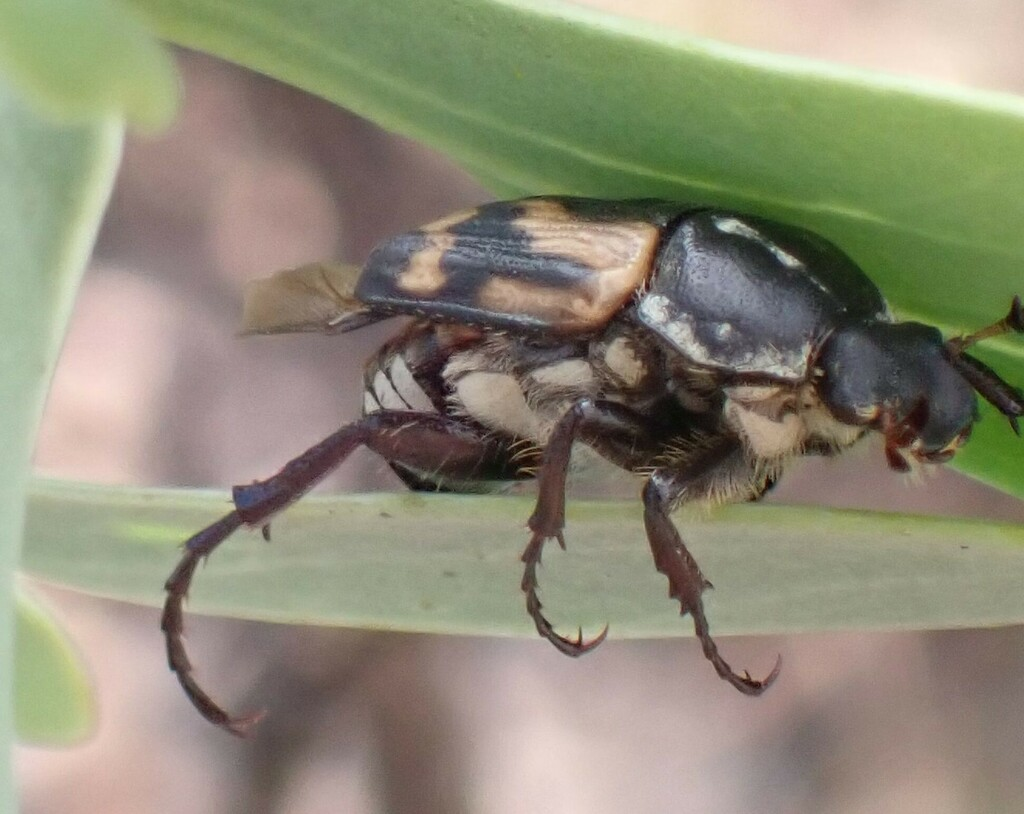

Scientific classification
- Kingdom: Animalia
- Phylum: Arthropoda
- Clade: Pancrustacea
- Class: Insecta
- Order: Coleoptera
- Suborder: Polyphaga
- Infraorder: Scarabaeiformia
- Family: Scarabaeidae
- Genus: Stripsipher
- Species: S. jansoni

Binomial name
- Stripsipher jansoni Péringuey, 1908

Synonyms
- Stripsipher drakensbergi Ricchiardi, 1998

= Stripsipher jansoni =

Species of beetle

Stripsipher jansoni is a species of beetle of the family Scarabaeidae. It is found in South Africa (Eastern Cape, Free State, KwaZulu-Natal, Mpumalanga) and Lesotho.

== Description ==
Adults reach a length of about 11–11.5 mm (0.43–0.45 in). They are black with a few white splashes on the margins of the pronotum. The elytra are flavescent and have an U-shaped black band reaching from the humeral ridge to the past median part, and a narrow marginal band becoming very broad in the posterior margin. The pygidium has a conspicuous sub-triangular lateral white patch, the abdominal segments each with longitudinal interrupted white band. The pro-, meso-, and metathorax, and also the coxae have a white patch. The antennae and palps are brick-red and the legs reddish. They may also be completely black with only the antennae reddish brown.
