= Indotrichius =

Scientific classification
- Kingdom: Animalia
- Phylum: Arthropoda
- Clade: Pancrustacea
- Class: Insecta
- Order: Coleoptera
- Suborder: Polyphaga
- Infraorder: Scarabaeiformia
- Family: Scarabaeidae
- Subfamily: Cetoniinae
- Tribe: Trichiini
- Genus: Indotrichius; Krikken, 2009

Genus of leaf beetles

Indotrichius is a genus of beetles belonging to the family Scarabaeidae.

== Species ==
- Indotrichius assamensis (Krajčik, 2008)
- Indotrichius gorodinskii (Tauzin, 2013)
- Indotrichius ornatus (Jordan, 1895)
- Indotrichius sikkimensis (Krajčik, 2008)
- Indotrichius vietnamensis Ricchiardi, 2017
