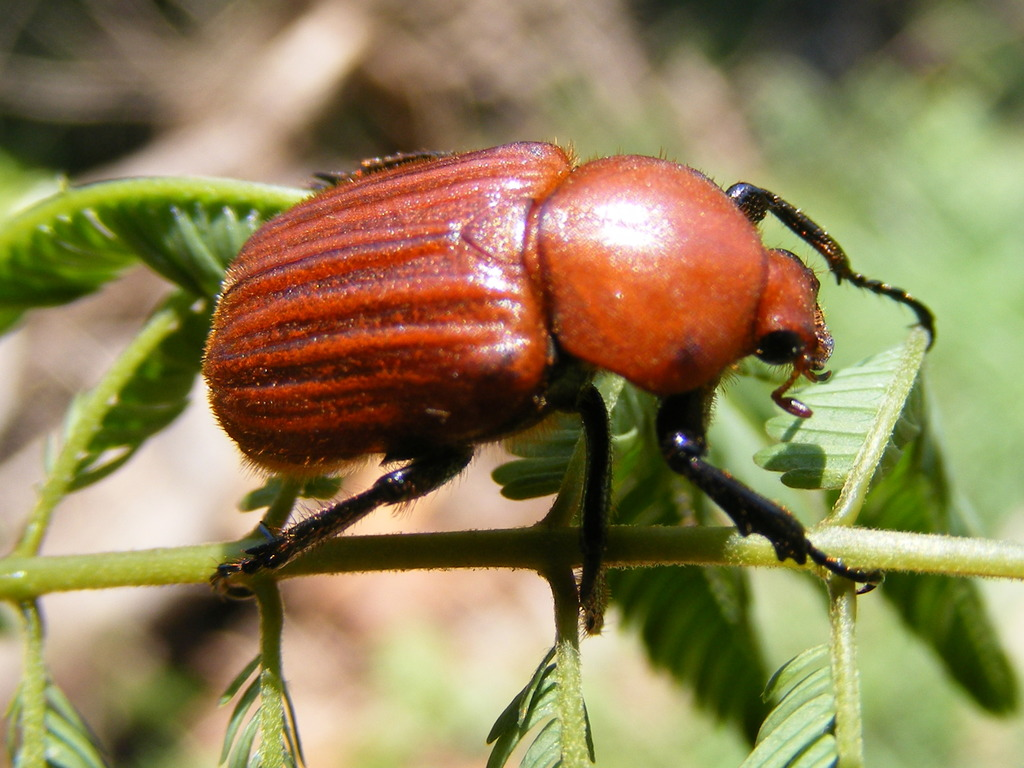

Scientific classification
- Kingdom: Animalia
- Phylum: Arthropoda
- Clade: Pancrustacea
- Class: Insecta
- Order: Coleoptera
- Suborder: Polyphaga
- Infraorder: Scarabaeiformia
- Family: Scarabaeidae
- Genus: Myodermum
- Species: M. rufum

Binomial name
- Myodermum rufum (Waterhouse, 1885)

Synonyms
- Myoderma rufa Waterhouse, 1885

= Myodermum rufum =

Species of beetle

Myodermum rufum is a species of beetle of the family Scarabaeidae. It is found in Mozambique, the Democratic Republic of the Congo, South Africa (KwaZulu-Natal, Mpumalanga, Limpopo), Zambia and Zimbabwe.

== Description ==
Adults reach a length of about 12–17 mm (0.47–0.67 in). The head, pronotum, elytra and abdomen are brick-red and moderately shiny. The edge of the clypeus, breast and legs are black, and the upper and undersides are clothed with a very dense, short, yellowish pubescence. The antennae are red.
