= Calometopidius =

Scientific classification
- Kingdom: Animalia
- Phylum: Arthropoda
- Clade: Pancrustacea
- Class: Insecta
- Order: Coleoptera
- Suborder: Polyphaga
- Infraorder: Scarabaeiformia
- Family: Scarabaeidae
- Subfamily: Cetoniinae
- Tribe: Trichiini
- Genus: Calometopidius; Bourgoin, 1917

Genus of leaf beetles

Calometopidius is a genus of beetles belonging to the family Scarabaeidae.

== Species ==
The following species are recognised in the genus Calometopidius:

- Calometopidius cavellae Bourgoin, 1917
- Calometopidius ducarmei (Ricchiardi, 2011)
- Calometopidius sinemaculatus Ricchiardi, 2023
