= Calometopus planatus =

Scientific classification
- Kingdom: Animalia
- Phylum: Arthropoda
- Clade: Pancrustacea
- Class: Insecta
- Order: Coleoptera
- Suborder: Polyphaga
- Infraorder: Scarabaeiformia
- Family: Scarabaeidae
- Genus: Calometopus
- Species: C. planatus

Binomial name
- Calometopus planatus Waterhouse, 1885

Species of beetle

Calometopus planatus is a species of beetle of the family Scarabaeidae. It is found in Tanzania.

== Description ==
Adults reach a length of about 14.1 mm (0.56 in). The head is castaneous and slightly shining, with the frons and clypeus covered with large punctures. Most punctures have testaceous setae. The antennae are also castaneous and the pronotum is castaneous with blackish areas and is covered with scattered large punctures, some also containing setae. The elytra are testaceous, shining and glabrous.
