= Paratrichius tergorufus =

Scientific classification
- Kingdom: Animalia
- Phylum: Arthropoda
- Clade: Pancrustacea
- Class: Insecta
- Order: Coleoptera
- Suborder: Polyphaga
- Infraorder: Scarabaeiformia
- Family: Scarabaeidae
- Genus: Paratrichius
- Species: P. tergorufus

Binomial name
- Paratrichius tergorufus Ricchiardi, 2019

Species of beetle

Paratrichius tergorufus is a species of beetle of the family Scarabaeidae. It is found in China (Fujian, Guangxi, Guizhou).

== Description ==
Adults reach a length of about 9.8–11.7 mm (0.39–0.46 in). They have an elongate body, with slender legs. The head is black and without chalky material, with the clypeus fulvous and the antennae dark brown (and the club fulvous). The lateral and posterior margins of the pronotum have a band of chalky material and there are scattered, pale yellow setae along the margins. The elytra are black, with reddish markings and seven striae of chalky material.

== Etymology ==
The species name is derived from Latin tergorufus and refers to the reddish anteapical umbones of the males.
