= Diploa =

Scientific classification
- Kingdom: Animalia
- Phylum: Arthropoda
- Clade: Pancrustacea
- Class: Insecta
- Order: Coleoptera
- Suborder: Polyphaga
- Infraorder: Scarabaeiformia
- Family: Scarabaeidae
- Subfamily: Cetoniinae
- Tribe: Trichiini
- Genus: Diploa; Kolbe, 1892

Synonyms
- Ligyromorphus Arrow, 1901

Genus of leaf beetles

Diploa is a genus of beetles belonging to the family Scarabaeidae.

== Species ==
- Diploa abyssinica Müller, 1939
- Diploa ghesquiereae Burgeon, 1932
- Diploa proles Kolbe, 1892
- Diploa rufiventris (Arrow, 1901)
- Diploa tridens Arrow, 1906
