= Myodermum nigerrinum =

Scientific classification
- Kingdom: Animalia
- Phylum: Arthropoda
- Clade: Pancrustacea
- Class: Insecta
- Order: Coleoptera
- Suborder: Polyphaga
- Infraorder: Scarabaeiformia
- Family: Scarabaeidae
- Genus: Myodermum
- Species: M. nigerrinum

Binomial name
- Myodermum nigerrinum Ricchiardi & Gill, 2009

Species of beetle

Myodermum nigerrinum is a species of beetle of the family Scarabaeidae. It is found in the Democratic Republic of the Congo and Uganda.

== Description ==
Adults reach a length of about 13–14.6 mm (0.51–0.57 in) for males and 14.5–16.1 mm (0.57–0.63 in) for females. Their body is shiny blackish-brown dorsally and reddish-brown ventrally. It is covered by scattered, erect ochraceous setae.
