= Stripsipher =

Scientific classification
- Kingdom: Animalia
- Phylum: Arthropoda
- Clade: Pancrustacea
- Class: Insecta
- Order: Coleoptera
- Suborder: Polyphaga
- Infraorder: Scarabaeiformia
- Family: Scarabaeidae
- Subfamily: Cetoniinae
- Tribe: Trichiini
- Genus: Stripsipher; Gory & Percheron, 1833

Genus of beetles

Stripsipher is a genus of scarab beetles in the family Scarabaeidae, subfamily Cetoniinae, and tribe Trichiini. Members of this genus are found primarily in southern Africa and are part of the group commonly referred to as flower chafers or fruit chafers.

== Description ==
Adult Stripsipher beetles exhibit typical cetoniine morphology, with an oval body shape adapted for crawling and feeding on plant materials. Larval stages were poorly known until relatively recent entomological work provided the first descriptions for some species. Morphological traits of larvae show affinities with other Trichiini genera but also exhibit diagnostic differences, particularly in the structure of the epipharynx.

== Taxonomy and nomenclature ==
The genus Stripsipher was first established by Hippolyte Louis Gory and Achille Rémy Percheron in 1833. Species within this genus have historically been subject to revisions and reclassification, reflecting ongoing taxonomic study in the African Trichiini.

== Species ==
The following species are currently recognized in the genus Stripsipher:

- Stripsipher braunsi Ricchiardi, 1998
- Stripsipher centralis Ricchiardi, 1998
- Stripsipher flavipennis (Gory & Percheron, 1833)
- Stripsipher jansoni Péringuey, 1908 (formerly also described as Stripsipher drakensbergi)
- Stripsipher lamellatus Ricchiardi, 2008
- Stripsipher latipennis Blanchard, 1850
- Stripsipher longipes (Swederus, 1787)
- Stripsipher monochrous (Fairmaire, 1894)
- Stripsipher morulus (Janson, 1885)
- Stripsipher orientalis Ricchiardi, 2008
- Stripsipher signatulus Ricchiardi, Perissinotto & Clennell, 2008
- Stripsipher spectralis Arrow, 1926
- Stripsipher superbus Ricchiardi, 2008
- Stripsipher turneri Arrow, 1926
- Stripsipher werneri Ricchiardi, 1998
- Stripsipher zebra Gory & Percheron, 1833 (PMC)

== Distribution and habitat ==
Species of Stripsipher are endemic to the Afrotropical region, particularly South Africa and adjacent countries. They inhabit forested areas and regions with decaying wood, where larvae develop. Adults are generally associated with flowers or other plant parts, consistent with the feeding habits of many Cetoniinae.

== Biology ==
The immature stages of Stripsipher species were unknown for many years, but recent research has described the larvae of at least two species (S. orientalis and S. jansoni), providing insights into their ecology and morphological adaptations. Larvae develop in decaying wood and show morphological similarities to other members of Trichiini, including adaptations of the epipharynx that differ from related taxa.
