= Paratrichius pejchai =

Scientific classification
- Kingdom: Animalia
- Phylum: Arthropoda
- Clade: Pancrustacea
- Class: Insecta
- Order: Coleoptera
- Suborder: Polyphaga
- Infraorder: Scarabaeiformia
- Family: Scarabaeidae
- Genus: Paratrichius
- Species: P. pejchai

Binomial name
- Paratrichius pejchai Mückstein, 2018

Species of beetle

Paratrichius pejchai is a species of beetle of the family Scarabaeidae. It is found in Vietnam.

== Description ==
Adults reach a length of about 15.2 mm (0.60 in). They have an elongate body with slender legs. The body is decorated with pale yellowish chalky material.

== Etymology ==
The species is named after Michal Pejcha, an entomologist and friend of the author.
