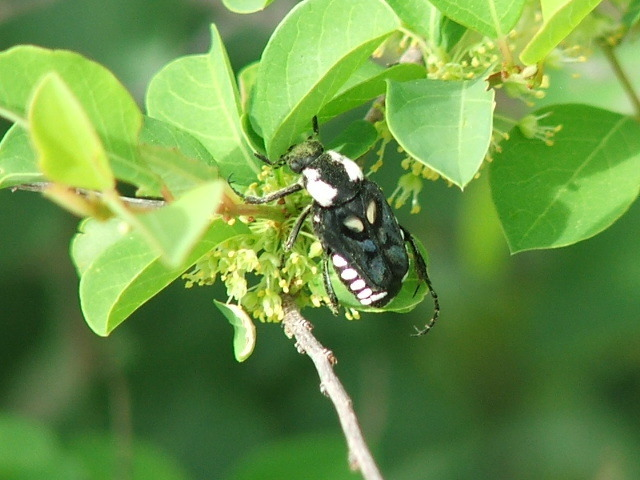

Scientific classification
- Kingdom: Animalia
- Phylum: Arthropoda
- Clade: Pancrustacea
- Class: Insecta
- Order: Coleoptera
- Suborder: Polyphaga
- Infraorder: Scarabaeiformia
- Family: Scarabaeidae
- Genus: Calometopus
- Species: C. nyassae

Binomial name
- Calometopus nyassae Westwood, 1878

= Calometopus nyassae =

Species of beetle

Calometopus nyassae is a species of beetle of the family Scarabaeidae. It is found in Malawi, Mozambique, South Africa, Tanzania and Zimbabwe.

== Description ==
Adults reach a length of about 13 mm (0.51 in). They are black and shiny. The clypeus is clothed with greyish-white, appressed, thin hairs, and the head is covered with a very short blackish pubescence. The pronotum is also covered with a similar tomentum, but has on the sides a broad band of long, appressed, squamiform whitish hairs mixed with a few flavescent ones. The very long, acuminate scutellum is concolorous and the glabrous elytra are strongly callose at the shoulder, and the triangular callus is continued as a sharp ridge reaching the apex, the supra-epipleural fold is almost vertical, and from the median part is so narrowed that the sides of the dorsal part of the abdominal segments are uncovered, and the apical part of the elytra is hardly more than half the width of the base, the dorsal part is plane but the suture is as sharply carinate as the dorsal ridge, the ground colour is black, but there are on each side straw-coloured patches along the suture, and a longitudinal band along the dorsal ridge. They are faintly punctate and singly sub-acuminate rounded at apex, with the angle of the suture very sharp, and they cover only a part of the propygidium. The pygidium is not vertical, as long as broad, acuminate, red, punctulate, glabrous but having in the centre a narrow band of appressed, squamose, white hairs.
