= Elpidus =

Scientific classification
- Kingdom: Animalia
- Phylum: Arthropoda
- Clade: Pancrustacea
- Class: Insecta
- Order: Coleoptera
- Suborder: Polyphaga
- Infraorder: Scarabaeiformia
- Family: Scarabaeidae
- Subfamily: Cetoniinae
- Tribe: Trichiini
- Genus: Elpidus; Péringuey, 1907
- Species: E. hopei

Binomial name
- Elpidus hopei (Burmeister, 1842)

Synonyms
- Xiphoscelis hopei Burmeister, 1842; Brachagenius lineatipennis Kraatz, 1890

Genus of beetles

Elpidus is a genus of beetle of the family Scarabaeidae. It is monotypic, being represented by the single species, Elpidus hopei, which is found in South Africa (Western Cape).

== Description ==
Adults reach a length of about 10–11 mm (0.39–0.43 in). They are black, with the antenne and elytra testaceous yellow, the latter with the suture, a diagonal discoidal band on each side, and the outer margin black. The upper side is nearly opaque and the head and clypeus are closely shagreened. The pronotum is plainly shagreened, convex in the posterior part, grooved longitudinally in the centre, and having along the outer margin a series of black setae. The scutellum is closely scabrose-punctate. The elytra are very slightly costate and not distinctly seriate-punctate, a little attenuated behind in males, not in females. The pygidium is glabrous, closely punctulate, black or reddish in females, but having in the male along the base two broad, transverse, white bands, divided by a narrow interval. The abdomen and legs are glabrous, shiny and sparsely punctate.
