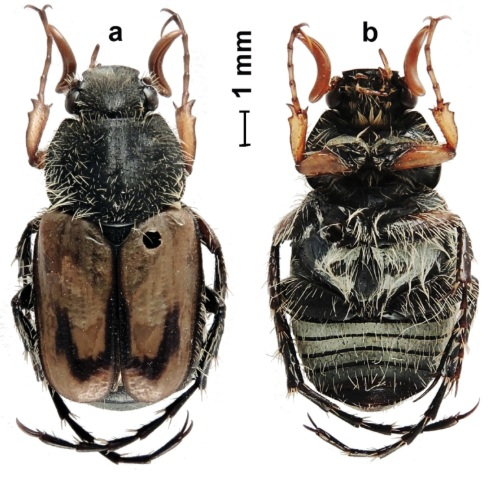
- Male
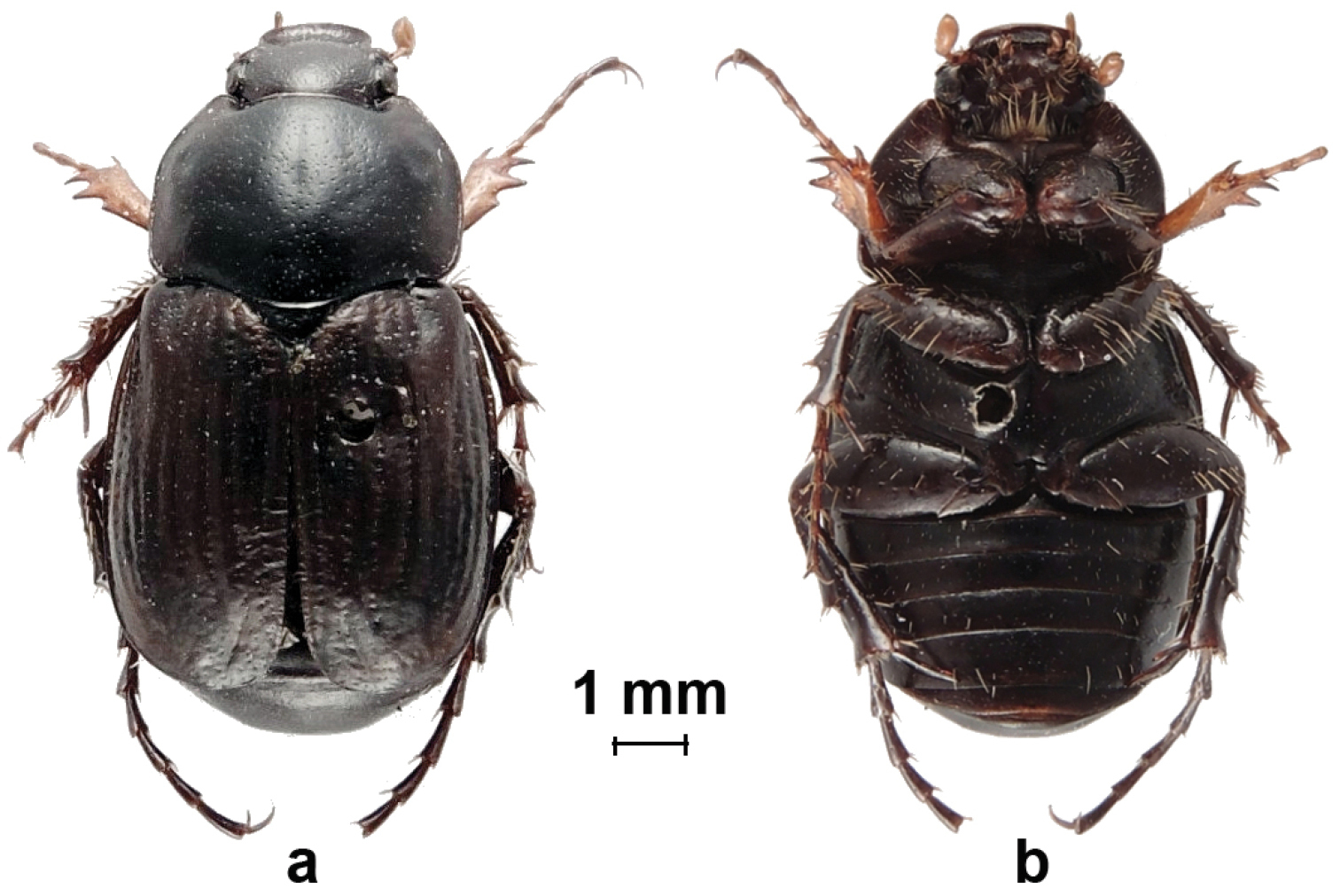
- Female

Scientific classification
- Kingdom: Animalia
- Phylum: Arthropoda
- Clade: Pancrustacea
- Class: Insecta
- Order: Coleoptera
- Suborder: Polyphaga
- Infraorder: Scarabaeiformia
- Family: Scarabaeidae
- Genus: Eriopeltastes
- Species: E. ornatus

Binomial name
- Eriopeltastes ornatus Ricchiardi & Perissinotto, 2014

= Eriopeltastes ornatus =

Species of beetle

Eriopeltastes ornatus is a species of beetle of the family Scarabaeidae. It is found in South Africa (KwaZulu-Natal). It occurs in the midlands of KwaZulu-Natal, at altitudes ranging from approximately 1460 to 1664 meters and in humid grassland habitats in the proximity of wetlands or streams.

== Description ==
Adults reach a length of about 9.6 mm (0.38 in) for males and 10.1 mm (0.40 in) for females. They have a black body. The elytra are light brown, with the sutural margins black and a black band continuing around posterior margin of elytral disk crossing the apical umbone and extending anteriorly about half the length of elytra.

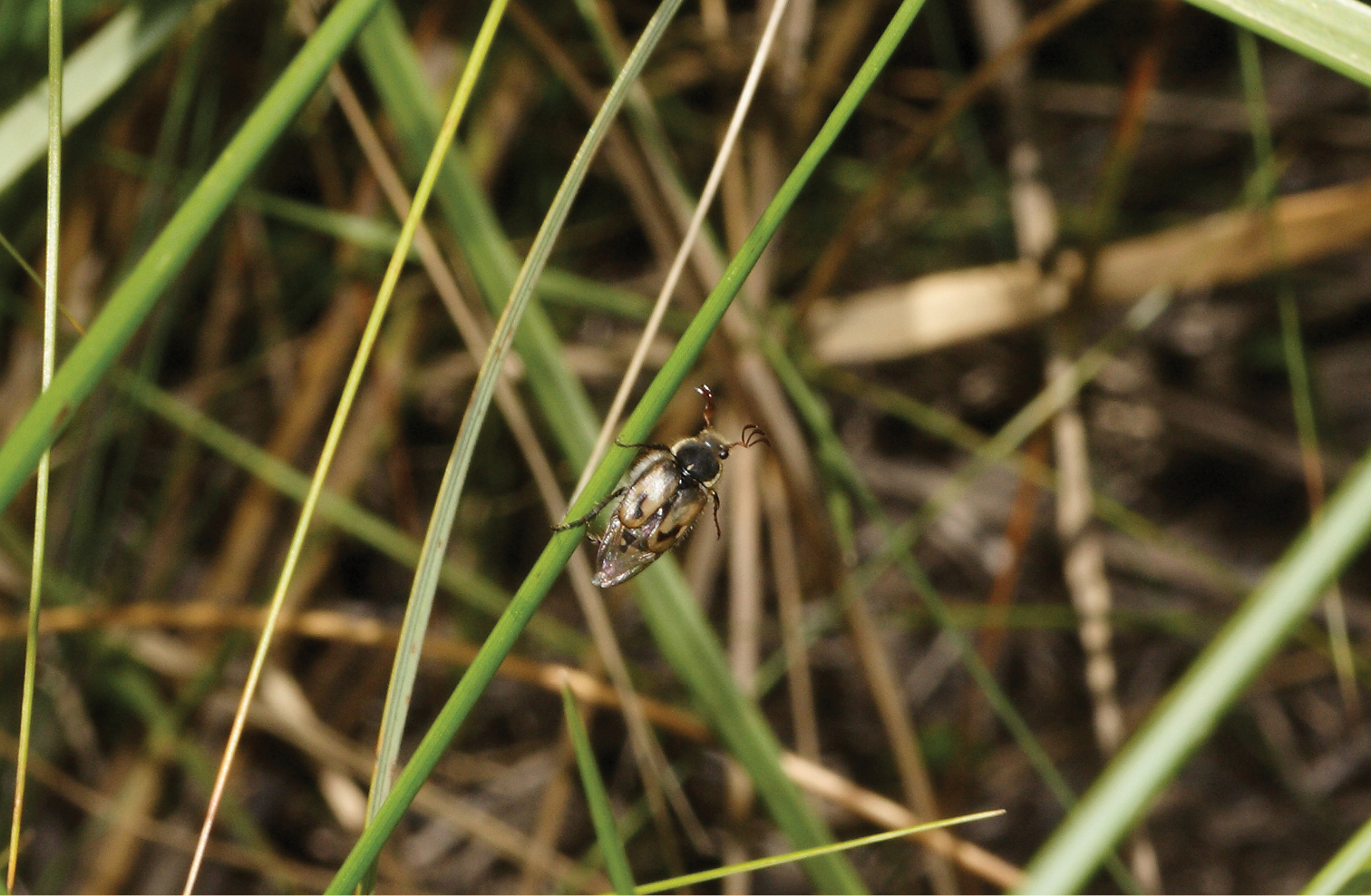

== Etymology ==
The species is named after the prominent J-shaped black band it exhibits on the sutural margin and on the apical raised part of the costal disc of each elytron.
