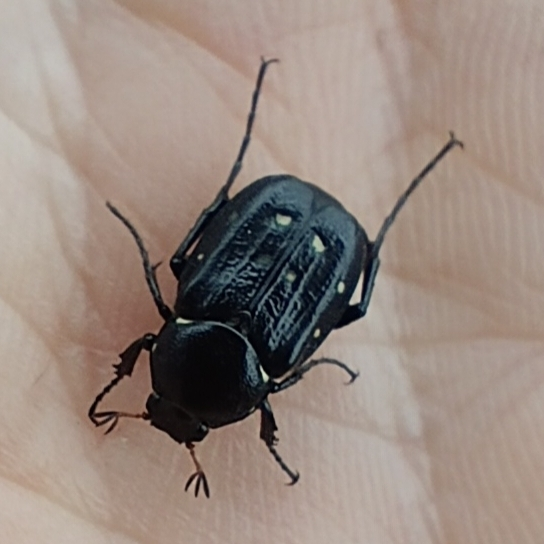

Scientific classification
- Kingdom: Animalia
- Phylum: Arthropoda
- Clade: Pancrustacea
- Class: Insecta
- Order: Coleoptera
- Suborder: Polyphaga
- Infraorder: Scarabaeiformia
- Family: Scarabaeidae
- Genus: Stripsipher
- Species: S. longipes

Binomial name
- Stripsipher longipes (Swederus, 1787)

Synonyms
- Scarabaeus longipes Swederus, 1787; Trichius swederi Schönherr, 1817

= Stripsipher longipes =

Species of beetle

Stripsipher longipes, the longleg wood chafer, is a species of beetle of the family Scarabaeidae. It is found in South Africa (KwaZulu-Natal, Western Cape, Eastern Cape, Mpumalanga, Gauteng, North West).

== Description ==
Adults reach a length of about 9.25–13 mm (0.364–0.512 in). The colouration of this species varies considerably, but black or piceous-red elytra predominate in females. They are glabrous, black and shiny, the pronotum with a white outer marginal band, which, however, is often obliterated. The scutellum has two white spots and the elytra are either flavous and maculated with black or quite black, they have on each side two white spots above the outer margin, and two on each side of the suture. The pygidium has two yellowish or whitish spots on each side, these spots coalesce often and thus form an arcuate patch.
