= Calometopus modestus =

Scientific classification
- Kingdom: Animalia
- Phylum: Arthropoda
- Clade: Pancrustacea
- Class: Insecta
- Order: Coleoptera
- Suborder: Polyphaga
- Infraorder: Scarabaeiformia
- Family: Scarabaeidae
- Genus: Calometopus
- Species: C. modestus

Binomial name
- Calometopus modestus Ricchiardi, 2001

Species of beetle

Calometopus modestus is a species of beetle of the family Scarabaeidae. It is found in Sierra Leone and Ivory Coast.

== Description ==
Adults reach a length of about 9.9 mm (0.39 in). The body is black and shiny, while the elytra are brown and opaque.
