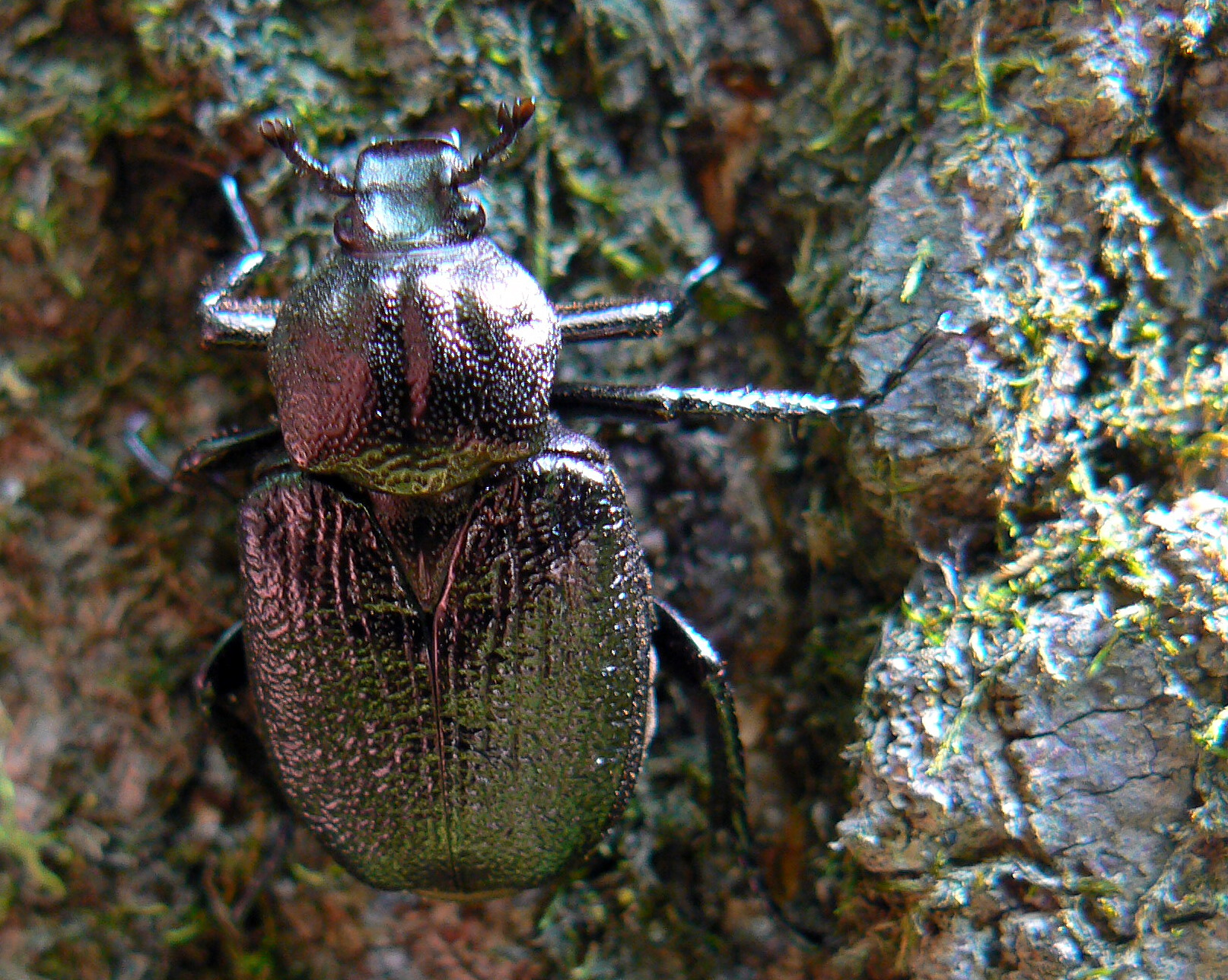
- Osmoderma scabra

Scientific classification
- Kingdom: Animalia
- Phylum: Arthropoda
- Clade: Pancrustacea
- Class: Insecta
- Order: Coleoptera
- Suborder: Polyphaga
- Infraorder: Scarabaeiformia
- Family: Scarabaeidae
- Subfamily: Cetoniinae
- Tribe: Trichiini; Fleming, 1821

Synonyms
- Trichiinae; Myodermini

= Trichiini =

Tribe of beetles

The Trichiini are a tribe of the scarab beetle family (Scarabaeidae), though historically they were often classified as a subfamily, Trichiinae. In Europe, the conspicuous bee beetles (Trichius) are probably the best-known genus of the tribe.

They vary in size from 6 to 65 mm and can be distinguished from Cetoniini by having covered epimeres, and lateral edges of the elytra which are not trimmed.

The adults feed on sugar-rich secretions of stems, leaves, fruits and flowers of different plants. Most larvae develop in rotten wood.

== Taxonomy ==
Historically, a number of subtribes (Cryptodontina, Incaina, Osmodermatina, Platygeniina) was included in this tribe. However, these are now treated as full tribes.

== Genera ==
- Agnorimus Miyake & Iwase, 1991
- Apeltastes Howden, 1968
- Brachagenius Kraatz, 1890
- Breviclypeus Ricchiardi, 2017
- Calometopidius Bourgoin, 1917
- Calometopus Blanchard, 1850
- Camapterus Ricchiardi, 2000
- Campulipus Kirby, 1827
- Chaetodermina Heller, 1921
- Clastocnemis Burmeister, 1840
- Corynotrichius Kolbe, 1892
- Dialithus Parry, 1849
- Diploa Kolbe, 1892
- Elpidus Péringuey, 1907
- Endoxazus Kolbe, 1892
- Epitrichius Tagawa, 1941
- Eriopeltastes Burmeister & Schaum, 1840
- Giesbertiolus Howden, 1988
- Glaphyronyx Moser, 1924
- Gnorimella Casey, 1915
- Gnorimotrichius Krajčik, 2009
- Gnorimus Le Peletier de Saint-Fargeau & Audinet-Serville, 1828
- Incala Thomson, 1857
- Indognorimus Krikken, 2009
- Indotrichius Krikken, 2009
- Iridisoma Delgado & Morón, 1991
- Lasiotrichius Reitter, 1899
- Liotrichius Kolbe, 1892
- Motuotrichius Huang & Chen, 2016
- Myodermides Ruter, 1964
- Myodermum Burmeister & Schaum, 1840
- †Paleotrichius Poinar, 2011
- Paragnorimus Becker, 1910
- Paratrichius Janson, 1881
- Pileotrichius Bourgoin, 1921
- Polyplastus Janson, 1888
- Pseudagenius Heller, 1923
- Pseudostegopterus Ricchiardi, 2015
- Stegopterus Burmeister & Schaum, 1840
- Stripsipher Gory & Percheron, 1833
- Tibiotrichius Miyake, 1994
- Trichiotinus Casey, 1915
- Trichius Fabricius, 1775
- Trigonopeltastes Burmeister & Schaum, 1840
