= Stripsipher centralis =

Scientific classification
- Kingdom: Animalia
- Phylum: Arthropoda
- Clade: Pancrustacea
- Class: Insecta
- Order: Coleoptera
- Suborder: Polyphaga
- Infraorder: Scarabaeiformia
- Family: Scarabaeidae
- Genus: Stripsipher
- Species: S. centralis

Binomial name
- Stripsipher centralis Ricchiardi, 1998

Species of beetle

Stripsipher centralis is a species of beetle of the family Scarabaeidae. It is found in South Africa (KwaZulu-Natal, Free State, Mpumalanga).

== Description ==
Adults reach a length of about 14 mm (0.55 in). The head is black with the frons glabrous and with orange-reddish antennae. The pronotum is shining, glabrous and reddish, with two longitudinal black bands on the disk. The elytra are glabrous, shining and reddish.
