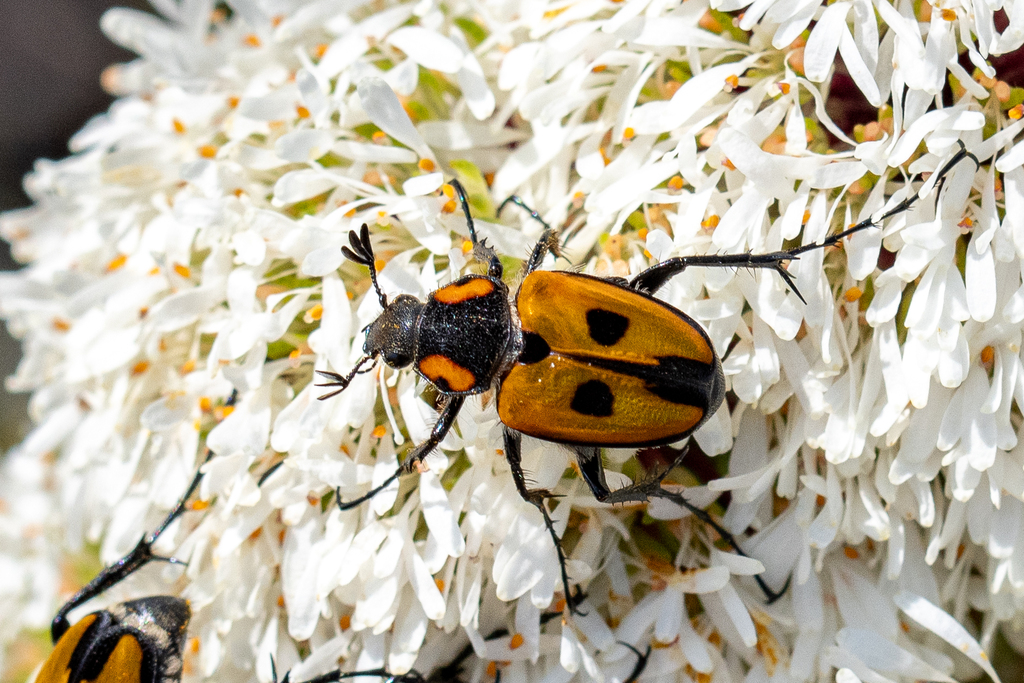

Scientific classification
- Kingdom: Animalia
- Phylum: Arthropoda
- Clade: Pancrustacea
- Class: Insecta
- Order: Coleoptera
- Suborder: Polyphaga
- Infraorder: Scarabaeiformia
- Family: Scarabaeidae
- Genus: Campulipus
- Species: C. limbatus

Binomial name
- Campulipus limbatus (Olivier, 1789)

Synonyms
- Melolontha limbata Olivier, 1789; Agenius nobilis Thomson, 1878

= Campulipus limbatus =

Species of beetle

Campulipus limbatus, the longleg flower chafer, is a species of beetle of the family Scarabaeidae. It is found in South Africa (Western Cape).

== Description ==
Adults reach a length of about 12–14.5 mm (0.47–0.57 in). They are black, with the elytra testaceous yellow, and the upper part not shiny. The clypeus is covered, like the head, with deep, round, sub-confluent punctures. The antennae are black. The pronotum is closely punctured, the punctures deeper and somewhat coarser in the female than in the male, in which the anterior margin bears a few scattered, long flavescent hairs which are entirely wanting in the female in which also the pronotum is wholly black, whereas in the male there is a broad supra-lateral, rufo-flavescent band. The elytra are testaceous yellow with an elongated discoidal, black median patch on each side, a sutural black band beginning at about the median part, and very narrow there, but widening as it reaches the apex, and an outer marginal black band, tapering, however, in the direction of the base. The pygidium and abdomen are black and glabrous.
