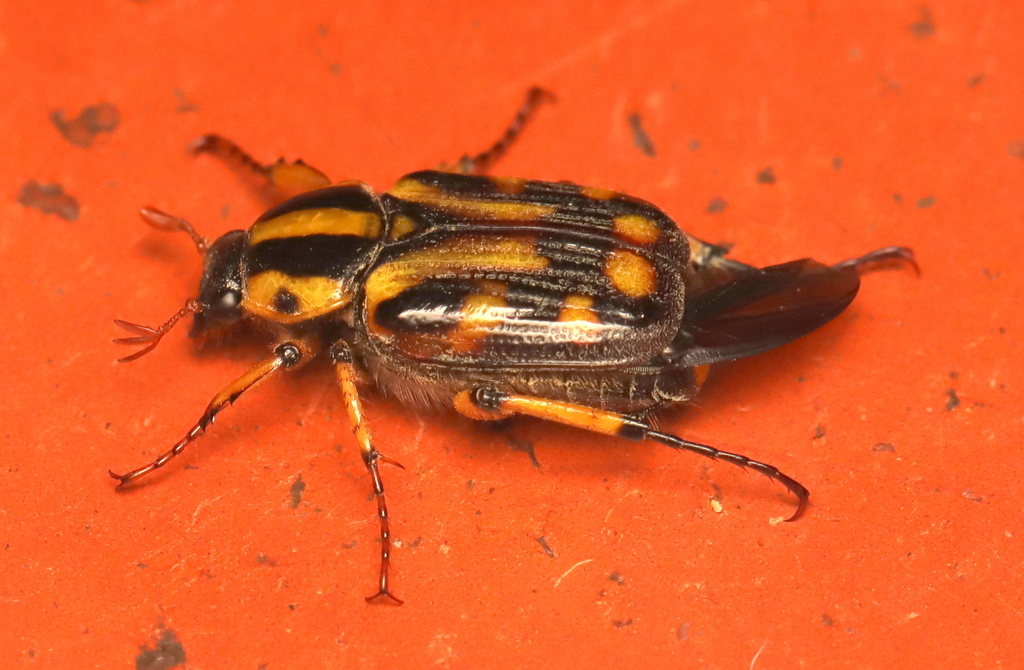

Scientific classification
- Kingdom: Animalia
- Phylum: Arthropoda
- Clade: Pancrustacea
- Class: Insecta
- Order: Coleoptera
- Suborder: Polyphaga
- Infraorder: Scarabaeiformia
- Family: Scarabaeidae
- Genus: Stripsipher
- Species: S. zebra

Binomial name
- Stripsipher zebra Gory & Percheron, 1833

Synonyms
- Stripsipher niger Gory & Percheron, 1833

= Stripsipher zebra =

Species of beetle

Stripsipher zebra, the zebra wood chafer, is a species of beetle of the family Scarabaeidae. It is found in South Africa (Western Cape).

== Description ==
Adults reach a length of about 13–15 mm (0.51–0.59 in). The head is black, with the clypeus flavous or maculated with black. The pronotum is flavous and has two broad black bands and one small black patch surrounding the lateral impression. The elytra are flavous, with a longitudinal humeral broad fuscous band which coalesces more or less regularly with a post-median one reaching from side to side, and connected along the outer margin which is broadly infuscate, also along the discoidal part and along the suture with an apical, equally broad band. The flavous space is thus reduced to a sub-diagonal band reaching from the humeral part to the middle, a sub-humeral, supra-marginal transverse patch, and two similar supra-apical ones, but as often as not the fuscous or black bands impinge more and more on the flavous part, and the whole body, with the exception of the antennae, which remain flavescent, is black. Many specimens belonging to both sexes are entirely black (var. niger).
