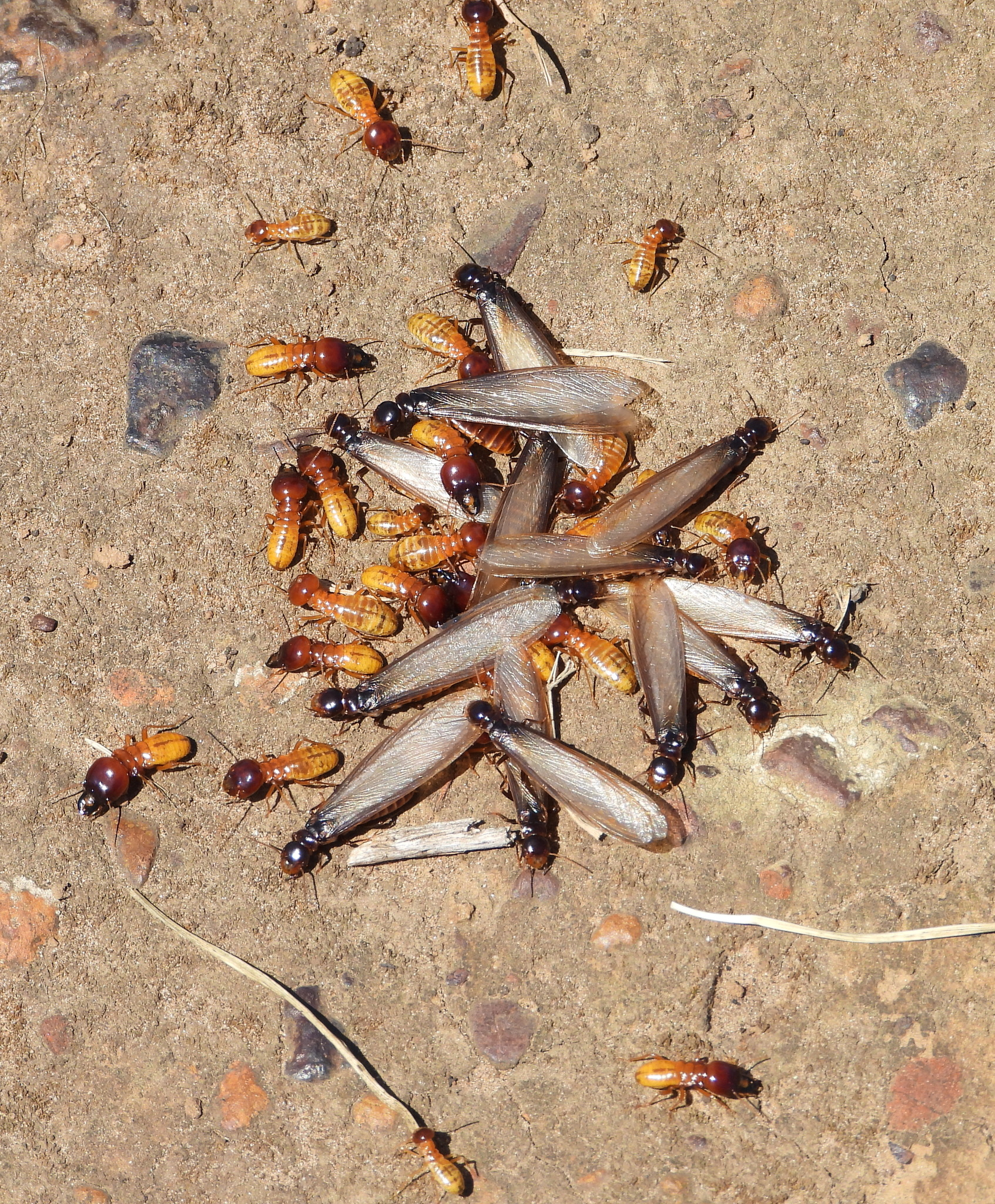
- Soldier and winged reproductive castes of Microhodotermes viator

Scientific classification
- Kingdom: Animalia
- Phylum: Arthropoda
- Clade: Pancrustacea
- Class: Insecta
- Order: Blattodea
- Infraorder: Isoptera
- Family: Hodotermitidae
- Genus: Microhodotermes
- Species: M. viator

Binomial name
- Microhodotermes viator (Latreille, 1804)

Synonyms
- Termes viator (Latreille, 1804); Hodotermes (Hodotermes) faurei (Fuller, 1921); Hodotermes (Hodotermes) peringueyi (Fuller, 1921); Hodotermes (Hodotermes) silvestrii (Fuller, 1921); Hodotermes (Hodotermes) thomseni (Fuller, 1921); Hodotermes viator hageni (Fuller, 1921); Hodotermes aurivillii (Sjöstedt, 1900)

= Microhodotermes viator =

Species of South African harvester termite

Microhodotermes viator, commonly called the southern harvester termite, the Karoo harvesting termite, the wood-eating harvester termite, houtkapper (lit. 'wood cutter'), and stokkiesdraer (lit. 'stick carrier'), is a species of harvester termite native to the desert shrubland of Namibia and South Africa. The eusocial insects inhabit soil mounds called heuweltjies. In 2024, researchers found inhabited Microhodotermes viator mounds up to 34,000 years old—by far the oldest active termite structures ever dated.

== Description ==
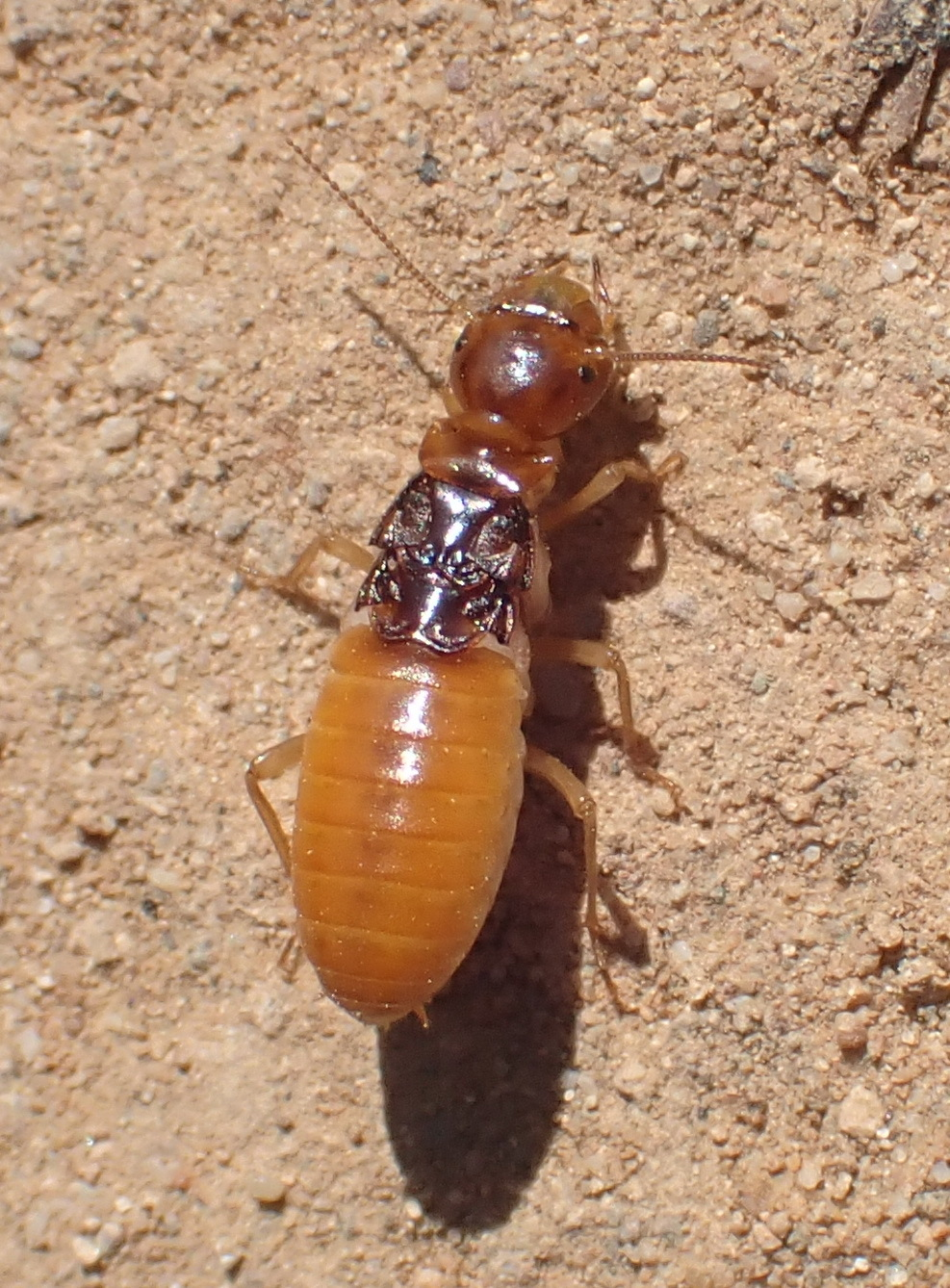
A worker termite

The holotype, collected and first described by Pierre André Latreille in 1804, has a clear red-brown head with a width of 3.8 mm. The unusually large head of M. viator is distinctive among Hodotermitidae. On its head are sharply defined bright yellow pseudo-ocelli. The body is an opaque yellow-orange, with a dark band in the transverse furrow of the prothorax, and the legs are pale yellow. Claude Fuller described the legs as brown or red-brown, with the tarsi and the tips of the tibiae and femora being yellow.

Latrielle described the larva as having a light brown body and a large brown head, distinctly faceted black eyes, and yellow ocelli.

The species is polymorphic, having different forms for different castes, and sexually dimorphic. Males are often larger than females. Soldier termites have long, thin jaws that curve inward only at their tips, and body lengths of 7–13 mm, while workers have indistinctly striped brown abdomens and body lengths between 6–8 mm. Alates have an average body length of 14.01 mm.

== Distribution and habitat ==
Microhodotermes viator is found in South Africa and Namibia, particularly on the west coast. It is found mainly in scrubland with annual precipitation of 125–750 mm. The precise range of M. viator has not been mapped. M. viator colonies in Namaqualand experience a warm and dry climate, with no perennial rivers in the area.

== Behavior ==
Microhodotermes viator are eusocial insects, forming colonies of several thousand with castes of workers and soldiers. They are foragers of plant material and emerge from their colonies during the day in winter and during the night in summer. A 1993 study suggests that M. viator thwarts predators by emerging to forage at unpredictable times of day, irrespective of temperature, humidity, and rainfall. Foraging M. viator work in groups to cut plants, particularly grass stalks and woody plants (particularly Pteronia), in pieces 1–2 cm long and carry them back to the nest through subsurface tunnels to be stored in underground chambers. They digest cellulose, making them extremely important decomposers in the microorganism-poor desert biomes they inhabit.

=== Nesting ===
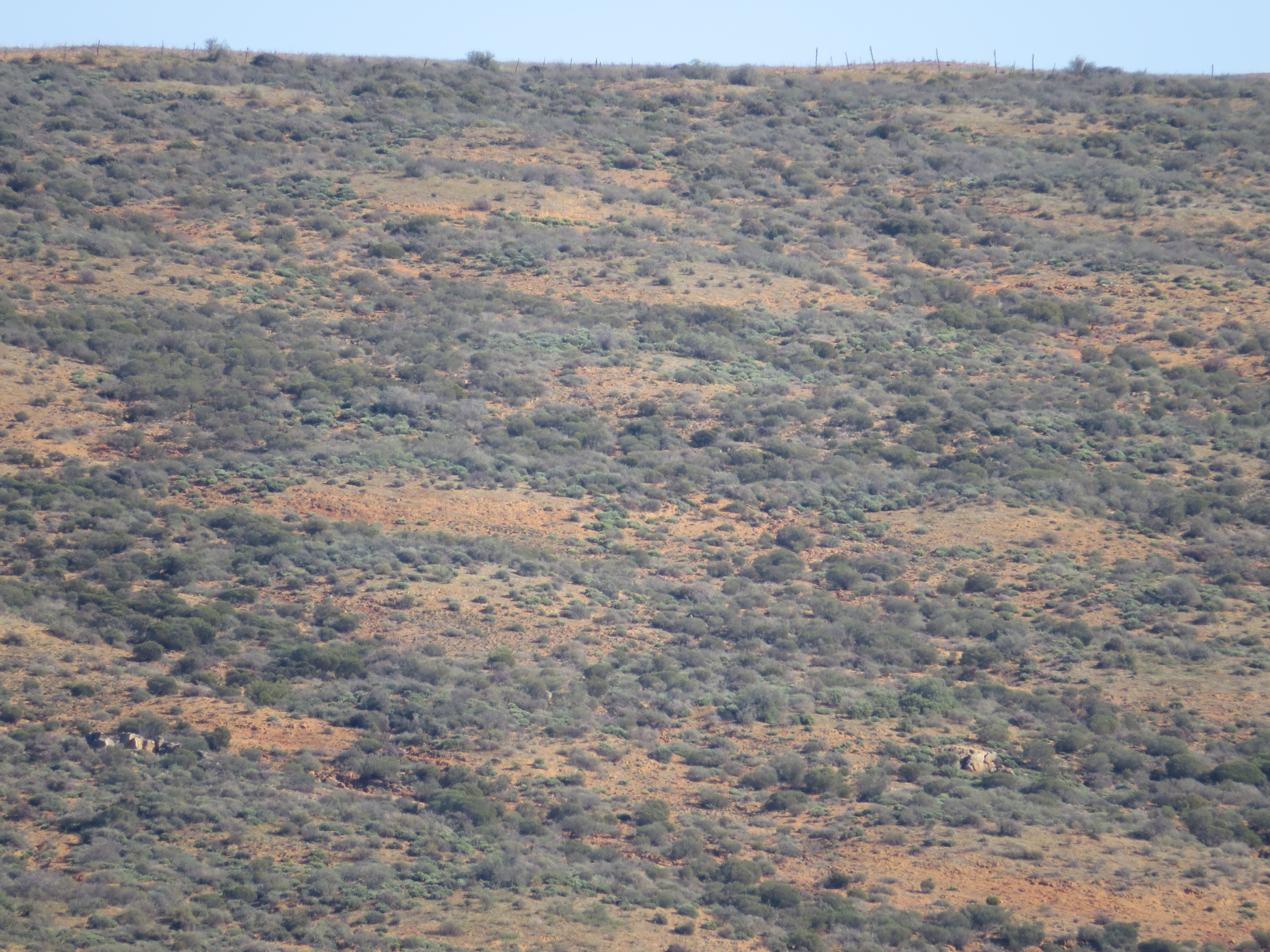
The large spots of reduced vegetation are heuweltjies, which are inhabited by Microhodotermes viator and cover 20% of South Africa's west coast.

Colonies of Microhodotermes viator form nests, including in regularly-spaced circular mounds of earth called heuweltjies (meaning 'little hills'), which when viewed from above resemble large fairy circles. Heuweltjies inhabited by M. viator cover over 20% of South Africa's west coast, including the Fynbos and Succulent Karoo biomes, and can reach up to 40 metres (130 ft) in diameter and 2 metres (6.6 ft) in height. There has been debate as to whether the heuweltjies are directly constructed by termites or if their formation is the product of erosion, both termite-influenced and not. The distribution of heuweltjies represents roughly 49% of the distribution of M. viator. M. viator colonies outside of the Succulent Karoo and Nama Karoo biomes do not form mounds; they live in nests a few metres underground. Studies investigating the role of M. viator in heuweltjie formation have found that the termites form them indirectly as ecosystem engineers by enriching the soil around their nests with organic matter, which has promoted growth of widely separated patches of vegetation that in turn influenced wind erosion to form the mounds. The soil chemistry of the heuweltjies is different from the surrounding soil, with mineral enrichments that align with those associated with other termite formations. The even spacing of the mounds is explained by proponents of the zoogenic hypothesis as being a result of competition between colonies for space and vegetation.

The superficial sand on heuweltjies inhabited by M. viator is also host to other termites, ants, burrowing bees, mole-rats, and aardvarks, all of whom actively rework the earth. The subsurface structure of the mounds, though, is dominated by the complex of tunnels and chambers constructed by M. viator. A study of mounds on the western bank of Clanwilliam Dam in South Africa, found active M. viator habitation in 78.9% of intact mounds, as indicated by piles of fresh frass.

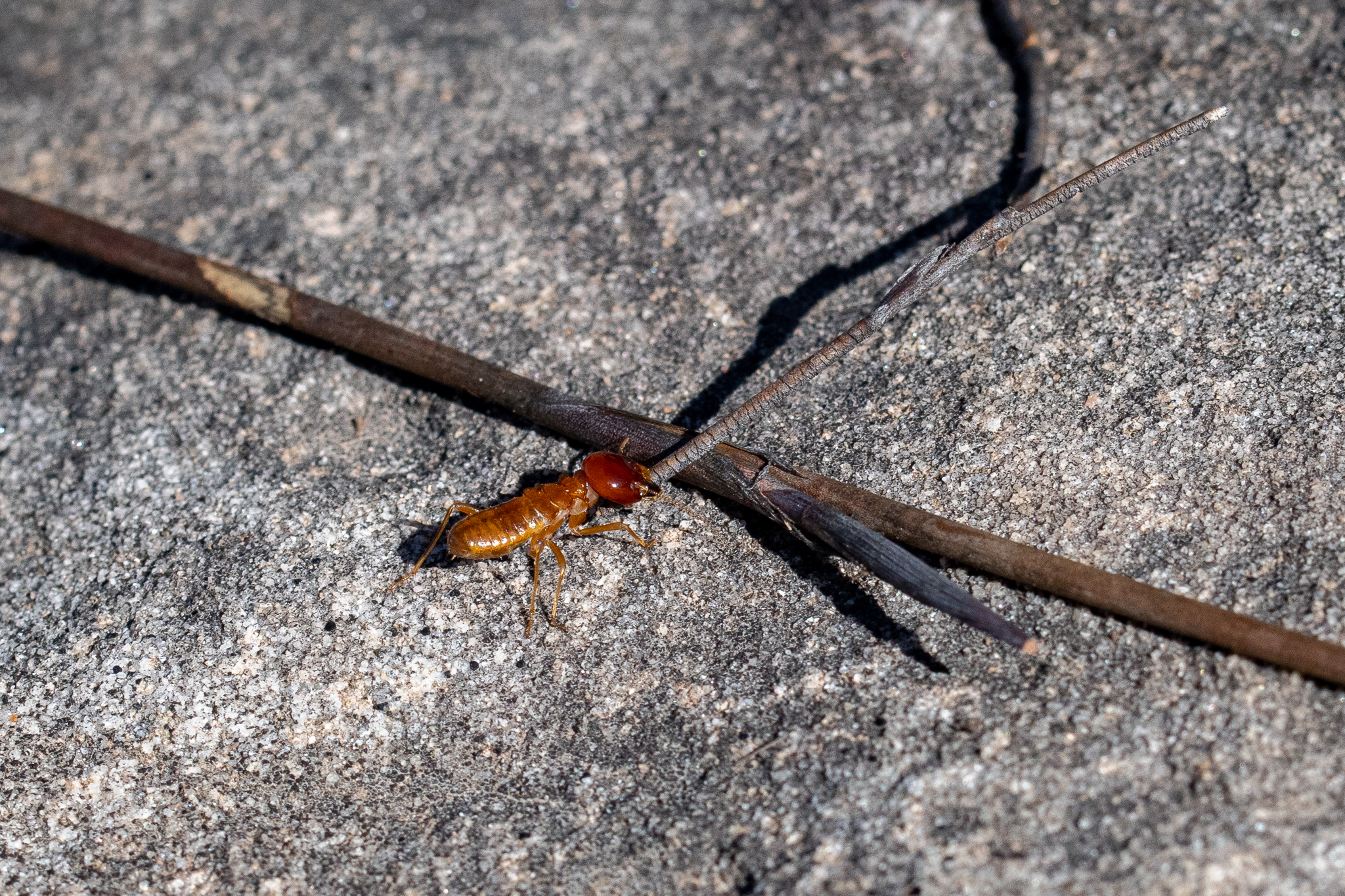
A worker moving a stick

The structures formed by M. viator are described as having four principal forms: anastomosing tubular tunnels 3 mm–1 cm wide; hundreds of straight tunnels extending with ellipsoidal cross-sections greater than 1 cm in width, which extended several metres radially from the mound's central depression to its periphery and beyond (apparently access ways connecting the hive to storage chambers and foraging sites), oval- or kidney-shaped chambers for the temporary storage of vegetation and cut twigs, generally 5–6 by 3–4 cm with a polished interior surface, and a delicate complex of horizontal shelves made of compacted organic material, which constituted the hive itself. The hive is roughly spherical and ranged from 0.3–1 m in diameter.

A 1991 study of calcified mounds inhabitied by M. viator found them to be 4,000 to 5,500 years old. Fossil termite structures were found in the mounds, indicating that the termite colonies had been inhabiting their mounds continuously throughout the period. In 2024, a team of researchers used carbon dating on inhabited M. viator mounds along the Buffels River in Namaqualand to discover that they were 34,000 years old—predating the Last Glacial Maximum—making them the oldest inhabited termite features ever dated. The study also found that the mounds contained organic material up to 19,000 years old buried deep within the mound, with the younger material being buried lower down at depths greater than 1 metre (3.3 ft). This led researchers to describe the inhabited termite mounds as "ancient carbon reservoirs".

== Symbiosis and parasites ==
=== Crustaceans ===
A number of termitophilous isopods live in the nests and foraging cells of M. viator colonies, including Phylloniscus braunsi, Titana mirabilis, Coatonia phylloniscoides, and Antidorcasia elongata. (Note: P. braunsi was found by researchers among M. viator nests in Aus, Namibia as well as in South Africa; the rest of the listed species were found in M. viator nests in South Africa.) The isopods, who are found in the nests of numerous termite species, most likely have an obligatory relationship with their termite hosts, probably living as scavengers feeding on detritus within the nest. The Titaniidae are either tolerated by their hosts, or are protected from attack by their speed and by their flat, horseshoe crab-like body shapes.

=== Insects and springtails ===
In the scarab family, the flower chafers Elpidus hopei, Xiphoscelis gariepina, and Trichoplus agis are termitophiles associated with M. viator, and T. aepytus, a dark brown Cremastocheilinus, is often found in Microhodotermes viator mounds in Namaqualand. The rove beetles Termitoletus schultzei, T. neoschultzei, T. niger, T. coatoni, T. sheasbyi, and Hodoxenus sheasbyi, and the clown beetles Monoplius pinguis, M. inflatus, and M. peringueyi, live in Microhodotermes viator nests, as do the primitive insects of the order Zygentoma Dinatelura afra, D. primitiva, Silvestrella termitophila, S. myrmecophila, Rulenatida apprima, Rulenatida primitiva, Natiruleda magnifica, Pseudaletura trichophila, Linadureta versicolor, Eluratinda sheasbyi, Eluratinda coatoni, and Ctenolepisma intercursa. H. sheasbyi is described as highly integrated into the society of its termite hosts. The beetles antennate soldier termites and offer the tips of their abdomens to the termites, who in turn seem to drink from the tip. The opposite situation, with the beetles drinking from the termites' abdomens after antennation, has also been observed.

The elongate-bodied Paronellid springtail Cyphoderus colurus is a termitophile associated with M. viator.

=== Protozoa ===
The flagellate form of the protozoan Gigantomonas herculea lives in the gut of Microhodotermes viator.

== Predation ==
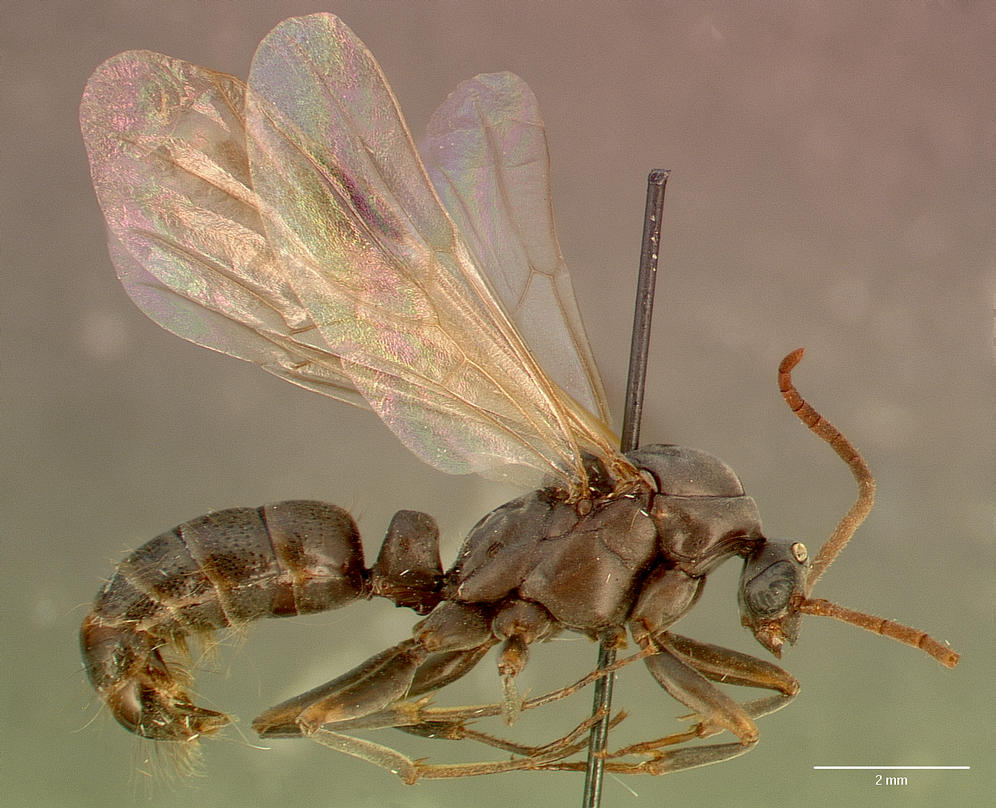
The ant Pachycondyla hottentota predates on M. viator

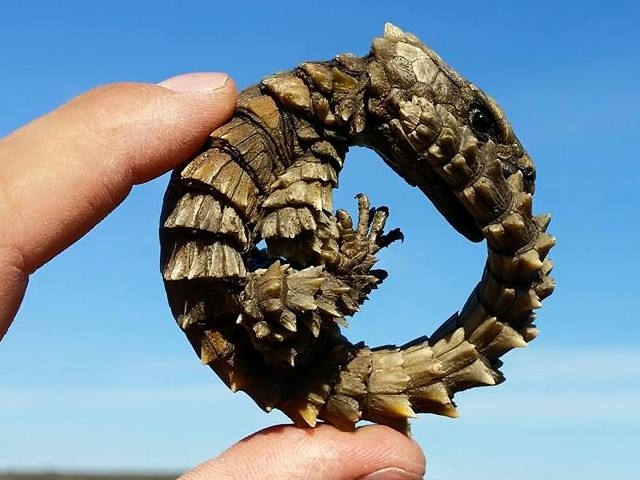
The armadillo girdled lizard (pictured here in its defensive posture, which resembles an ouroboros) feeds on southern harvester termites that emerge in large numbers after spring rains

=== Arthropods ===
A major predator of Microhodotermes viator is Pachycondyla hottentota, a specialized ant that catches termites as they return to foraging ports. Another specialized predator is the spider Ammoxenus daedalus. A. daedalus apparently feeds only on smaller worker termites, and "detects their suitability as prey items by touch". When a group of foraging termites is attacked, they respond by overwhelming the area with large workers so as to prevent the spider from finding a small enough termite to eat. Other predators include the ants Ocmyrmex cillei, Tetramorium signatum, and the invasive Argentine ant.

The sand termite Psammotermes allocerus feeds on organic matter in the waste dumps of M. viator.

=== Vertebrates ===
M. viator is possibly the most important prey item of the armadillo girdled lizard (Ouroborus cataphractus), which "feeds ferociously" on the large numbers of termites that appear just after the spring rains. The termites are also eaten by the lark Mirafra apiata, commonly known as the Cape clapper lark. The aardvark is a predator of M. viator, and a study of mounds near Clanwilliam Dam in South Africa found that 53.16% of intact mounds bore signs of aardvark excavation. Many of the mounds bearing signs of aardvark predation were still active, indicating that M. viator colonies are capable of surviving aardvark predation events.

The larvae and "flyer nymphs" of M. viator are recorded as being eaten by humans in South Africa. The "flyer nymphs" are described as resembling grains of rice when cooked—supposedly the source of the Afrikaans word for 'termite', rysmier (lit. 'rice-ant').
