= Melkbos =

Melkbos is an Afrikaans word which may refer to:

- Sideroxylon inerme, the white milkwood or "melkbos"
- Melkbosstrand, a coastal village north of Cape Town, South Africa
- Euphorbia damarana, or Damara milk-bush
