= Fairy circle (arid grass formation) =

Circular patches of land without vegetation but circled by growing grass in arid areas

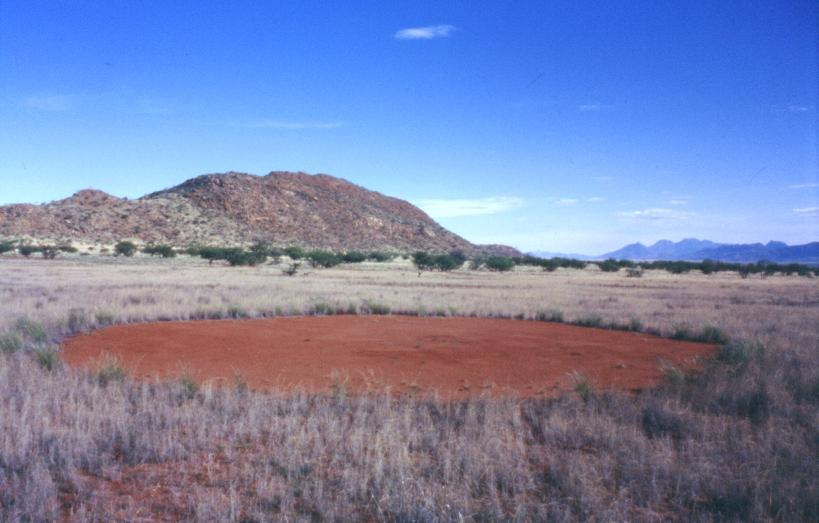
A single fairy circle, Namibia

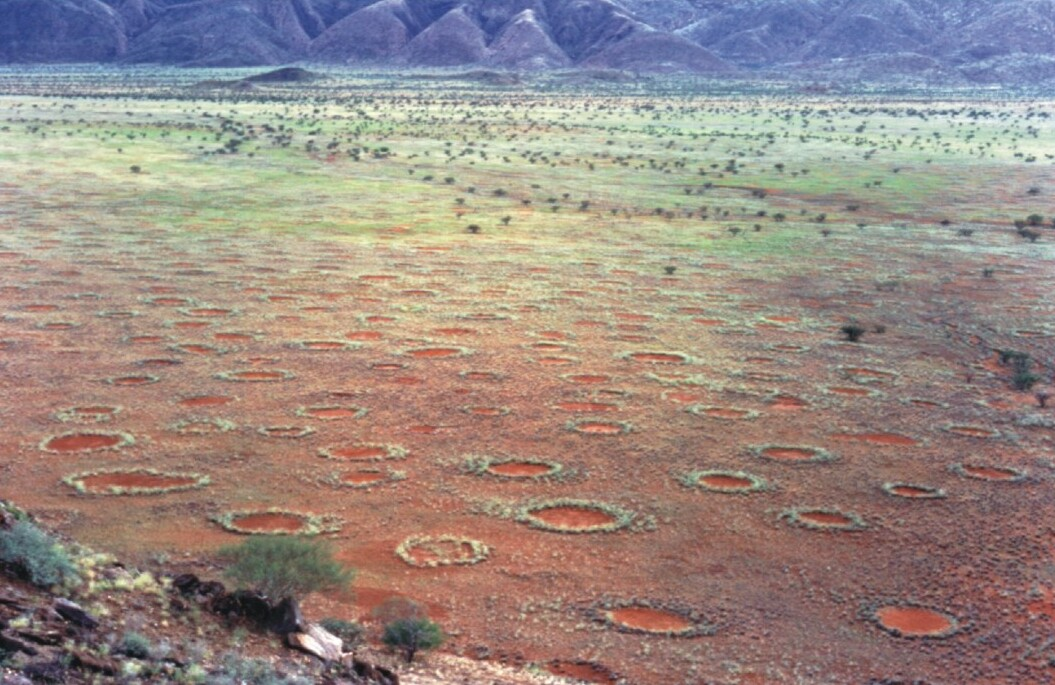
Fairy circles in the Marienflusstal area in Namibia

Fairy circles are circular patches of barren land, varying between 2 and 12 metres (7 and 39 ft) in diameter, often encircled by a stimulated growth of grass. They occur in the arid grasslands of the Namib desert in western parts of Southern Africa and in a part of the Pilbara in Western Australia. Studies have proposed various hypotheses about their origins, but none have conclusively proven how they are formed. Theories include hypotheses that the activities of various types of termites affect growth or that competition between grasses naturally yields certain vegetation patterns.

In the languages of the Aboriginal Australian peoples who inhabit the Pilbara, they are known as linyji (Manyjilyjarra language) or mingkirri (Warlpiri language).

== Location ==
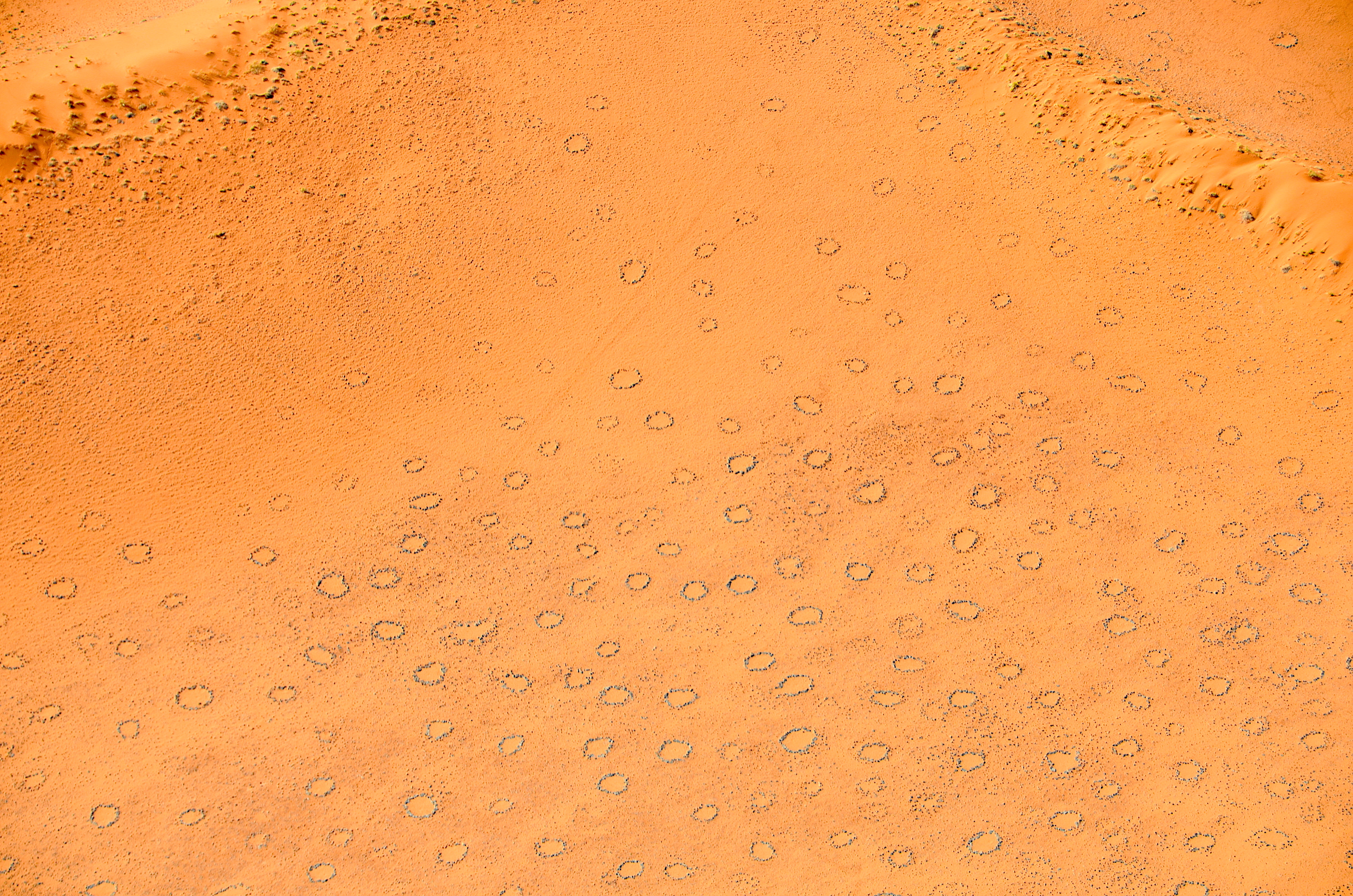
Aerial view of Fairy circles within Namib-Naukluft National Park (2017) 24°08′14.09″S 15°41′31.63″E

Until 2014, the phenomenon was only known to occur in the arid grasslands of the Namib desert in western parts of Southern Africa, being particularly common in Namibia. The circles occur in a band lying about 160 kilometres (100 miles) inland and extending southward from Angola for some 2,400 kilometres (1,500 miles) down to the Northwestern Cape province of South Africa. It is largely a remote and inhospitable region, much of it over a hundred kilometres from the nearest village. The circles have been recognised and informally remarked on for many years, first being mentioned in technical literature in the 1920s and intermittently thereafter with the intensity of study increasing during the final quarter of the 20th century.

In 2014, ecologists were alerted to similar rings of vegetation outside Africa, in a part of the Pilbara in Western Australia. Fairy circles were first discovered outside Africa, 15 km (9.3 mi) outside of the town Newman, in the Pilbara region of Western Australia. Australian environmental engineer Bronwyn Bell, alongside Stephan Getzin from the Helmholtz Centre for Environmental Research, released a paper in 2016, providing new insight into possible cause of the fairy circle formations.

Examples can be found at 24.95°S 15.93°E (Namibia) and 23.45°S 119.85°E (Western Australia). Fairy circles may also occur in North Africa, the Middle East and Madagascar.

== Description ==
Fairy circles typically occur in essentially monospecific grassy vegetation, where conditions are particularly arid. Associated grasses commonly are species in the genus Stipagrostis. Studies show that these circles pass through a life cycle of some 30 to 60 years. They become noticeable at a diameter of about 2 metres (6 ft 7 in), achieving a peak diameter of perhaps 12 metres (39 ft), after which they mature and "die" as they undergo invasion, mainly by grasses.

In the languages of the Martu and Warlpiri peoples of Western Australia, fairy circles are known as "linyji" in the Manyjilyjarra language and "mingkirri" in the Warlpiri language. But from a scientific perspective, termite linyji are common vegetation gaps and not true fairy circles.

== Formation hypotheses ==
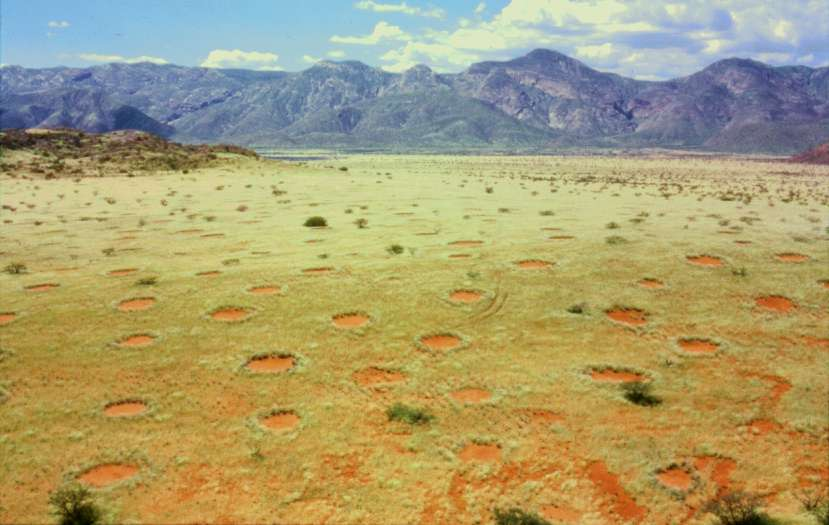
Fairy circles in Namibia's Marienfluss valley

Like heuweltjies in South Africa and Mima mounds in the U.S., the cause of fairy circles has long been a puzzle and the investigation has proved challenging. There may also be more than one explanation, as fairy circles in Namibia may be created in a different way from those in Australia, because they formed on sand rather than clay. Ecologists have hypothesized about why fairy circles appear in arid landscapes, and these can be grouped into two main theories: a termite origin hypothesis, and a vegetation self-organization hypothesis.

In 2004, University of Pretoria botanist Gretel van Rooyen rejected proposals of termite activity, radioactive soil, and of plant toxins. They concluded that fairy circles are possibly a phenomenon of vegetation self-organization, as there are many examples worldwide with similar vegetation patterns.

In 2008, Angelique Joubert proposed that residual plant toxins remaining in the soil after the death of Euphorbia damarana plants might be the cause of the barren interiors of the circles.

In 2012, Eugene Moll suggested the termite species Baucaliotermes hainsei and Psammotermes allocerus as the creator of these circles. All rings have been found to contain termite casts, and radar investigations suggest that a moist layer of soil is situated beneath the fairy circles.

In 2013, this theory was supported by Norbert Juergens. Juergens found evidence that the sand termite, Psammotermes allocerus, generates a local ecosystem that profits from and promotes the creation of the fairy circle. The sand termite was found in 80-100% of the circles, in 100% of newly formed circles, and was the only insect to live across the range of the phenomenon. Sand termites create the fairy circle by consuming vegetation and burrowing in the soil to create the ring. The barren circle allows water to percolate down through sandy soil and accumulate underground, allowing the soil to remain moist even under the driest conditions. Grass growth around the circle is promoted by the accumulated soil water, and in turn the termites feed on the grasses, slowly increasing the diameter of the circle. This behaviour on the part of Psammotermes allocerus amounts to creation of a local ecosystem in a manner analogous to behaviour of the common beaver.

Walter R. Tschinkel, a biologist at Florida State University, who also researched the fairy circles, remarked that Juergens "has made the common scientific error of confusing correlation (even very strong correlation) with causation". Previously, Tschinkel had searched for harvester termites without success. Juergens responded that sand termites differ from harvester termites and live deep beneath the circle; they do not create mounds or nests above ground, and they leave no tracks in the sand. In such respects the sand termite is unusually inconspicuous in its activities. However, Namibia's leading termite expert, Eugene Marais, searched specifically for sand termites and came to the same conclusion: "We have not found such a ubiquitous presence of sand termites at fairy circles as was suggested by Juergens [2013] when carrying out ad hoc searches throughout the fairy circle range."

Unresolved questions remain about the soil from the centre of the circle inhibiting plant growth and the interactions of other species in the fairy circle as they relate to the local ecosystem. The received wisdom from about a century ago remarked on the "heuweltjies" being anomalously rich in plant nutrients, raising the question of how many effectively different types or circumstances of circles or heuweltjies there might be.

Later in 2013, Michael Cramer and Nichole Barger suggested that the circles were the consequence of vegetation patterns that arose naturally from competition between grasses. They examined the conditions under which fairy circles arise and found that fairy circles are negatively correlated with precipitation and soil nutrition. This observation is consistent with resource competition being a cause of the circles. Grassy landscapes with a mixture of grasses can result in barren spots as a consequence of under-ground competition between different types of grasses. The patches are maintained because they form a reservoir of nutrients for the taller grasses at the periphery. Using rainfall, biomass and temperature seasonality, they can predict with high accuracy the presence or absence of fairy circles in a region. According to Walter Tschinkel, this theory accounts for all the characteristics of fairy circles, including the presence of tall grass species. In May 2014, Getzin et al. demonstrated that termite or gas activity cannot explain the extremely regular spacing of the fairy circles, but the patterns are congruent with typical patterns resulting from vegetation self-organization. Other recent work has considered interacting combinations of both animal- and vegetation-induced patterning effects as a potential unifying theoretical explanation for the fairy circle phenomenon. However, a large meta analysis of worldwide insect and fairy circle patterns in drylands confirmed earlier conclusions, showing that nest patterns of termites differ significantly from fairy circles. The spatially periodic (Turing-like) pattern of fairy circles is a typical example of vegetation self-organization in desert regions.

A 2015 theory about the Australian fairy circles suggested that the distinct vegetation patterns are a population-level consequence of competition for scarce water, as the plants "organise" themselves to maximise access to scarce resources. The circular barren patches capture water which then flows to the outer edges of the ring. More water available increases biomass and roots which leads to the soil becoming looser. The less dense soil allows more water to penetrate and feed the vegetation, creating a feedback loop supporting the plants at the edge of the circle. Field observations by Sujith Ravi, Lixin Wang and colleagues using soil moisture, soil particle size, and soil water infiltration measurements in Namibia in 2015 and 2016 support this.

In 2021, an explanation using hydrological feedbacks and the Turing mechanism was proposed as the cause of the patterns in Australia.

In 2022, a study was published that tested the termite theory and the theory of plant self-organization for Namibia by excavating hundreds of grasses within and around the fairy circles. The study revealed that the grasses within fairy circles died of plant-water stress but not due to root herbivory by termites because the roots were initially undamaged and as long or even longer than the roots of the vital grasses outside. Several fairy circle researchers stated that "The new study showed "conclusively" that termites were not a factor".

In 2024, it was shown that the topsoil within the fairy circles is significantly drier than outside in the matrix and that new emerging seedlings quickly die in fairy circles due to desiccation. In February 2025, Cramer and Tschinkel published a review article about all fairy circle theories. They emphasize that the self-organization of vegetation is the only theory that is consistent with all field observations, while all other theories have serious shortcomings.

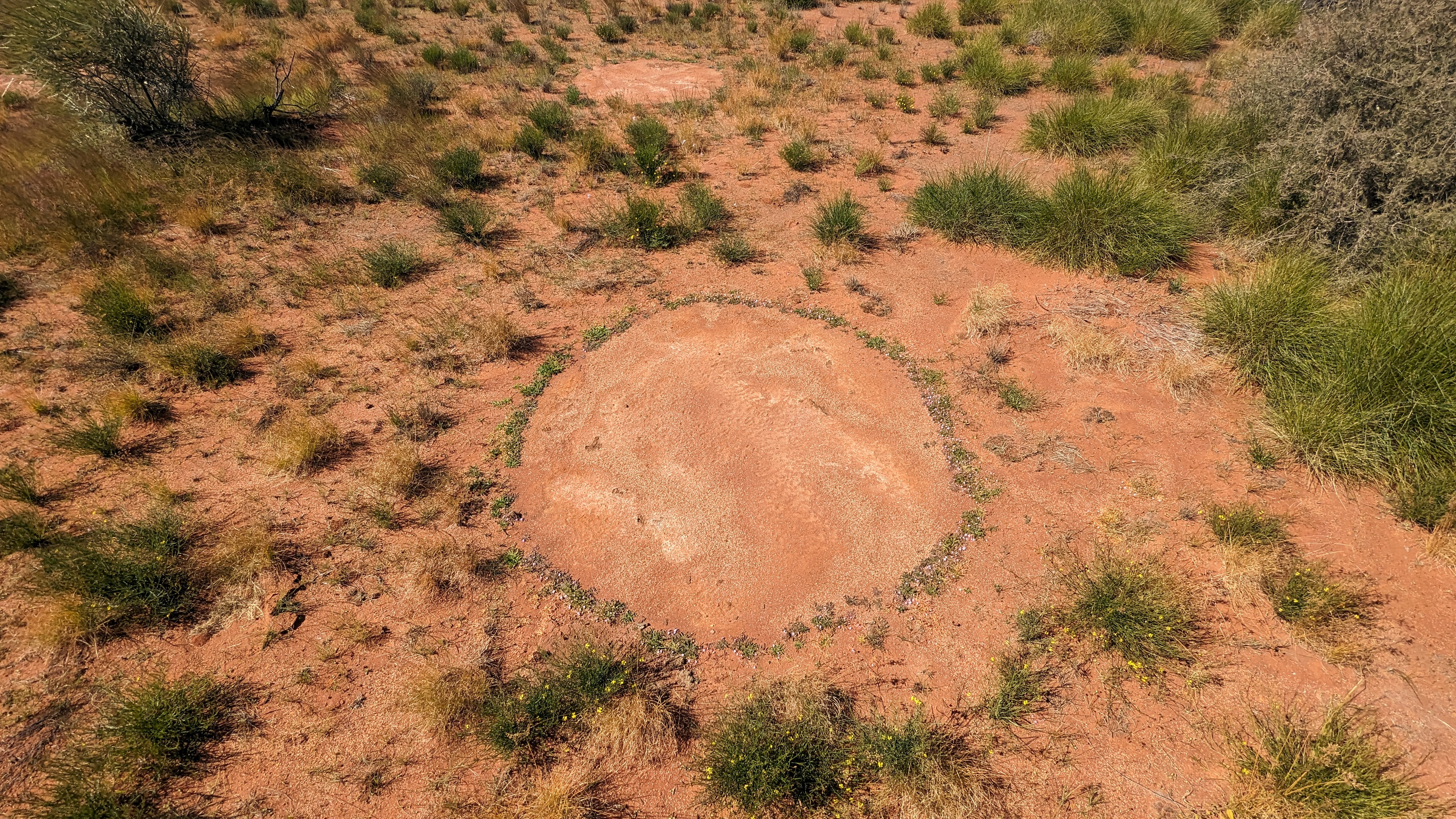
Fairy circles at Newhaven Wildlife Sanctuary in the Northern Territory

An Australian cross-cultural study published in April 2023, involving local Martu peoples and using their traditional knowledge of the phenomenon, are pavement nests occupied by Drepanotermes (Australian harvester termites). The research showed that the circles may have been created in the Pleistocene (over 12,000 years ago), and that termites lived in them and were continuing to build them. Aboriginal peoples have lived on the Australian continent for up to 65,000 years and have deep knowledge passed down through their oral traditions. However, this study did not account for the actual mechanism which causes the Australian fairy circles. Detailed research on the specific Australian fairy circles, conducted between 2014 and 2019, has shown that the bare-soil gaps are caused by abiotic weathering of the soil surface, resulting in clay crusts and inhibition of grass growth within the circles. Thus, Australian fairy circles and termite linyji are different and not caused by the same mechanism.

=== Birth and death ===
One interesting phenomenon of fairy circles is their "birth and death", that is, their appearance and disappearance over time. In some cases, fairy circles have disappeared within a span of 10 years or less, while other fairy circles may have lasted for centuries. These births and deaths, taken over long time spans, can lead to regime shifts, such as desertification of this ecosystem. This means that these events may be indicative of a large-scale transformation of this landscape, so that observing fairy circles birth is indicative of a gradual desertification process taking place. Scientists have tried to test if such birth or death can occur due to intervention, for instance by changing the amount of water in the system. This, in turn, can potentially help determine the true cause of fairy circles.

=== Myths ===
In the oral myths of the Himba people of the Kunene Region of northern Namibia, these barren patches are said to have been caused by the gods, spirits and/or natural divinities. The region's bushmen have traditionally ascribed spiritual and magical powers to them. Of specific beliefs, the Himba people note that their original ancestor, Mukuru, was responsible for the creation of the fairy circles, or that they were the footprints of gods.

Another myth put forth, promoted by some tour guides in Namibia, is that the circles are formed by a dragon in the earth and that its poisonous breath kills the vegetation.

== Use ==
The Himba people use the fairy circles in their agriculture. Because fairy circles support grasses in otherwise barren land, they provide grazing. Sometimes they erect temporary wooden fences around the circles to corral young cattle for overnight protection against predators.

== See also ==
- Media related to Fairy circles at Wikimedia Commons
- Fairy ring – Naturally occurring ring or arc of mushrooms
- Forest ring – Patterns of low tree density in northern Canada
- Hodotermitidae – Family of termites
- Creosote bush rings – Species of plant
- List of unsolved problems in biology – Biological concepts and questions with insufficient resolutions
- Patterns in nature – Visible regularity of form found in the natural world
- Tiger bush – Topographic lines of vegetation arising from differential absorption of rainfall
