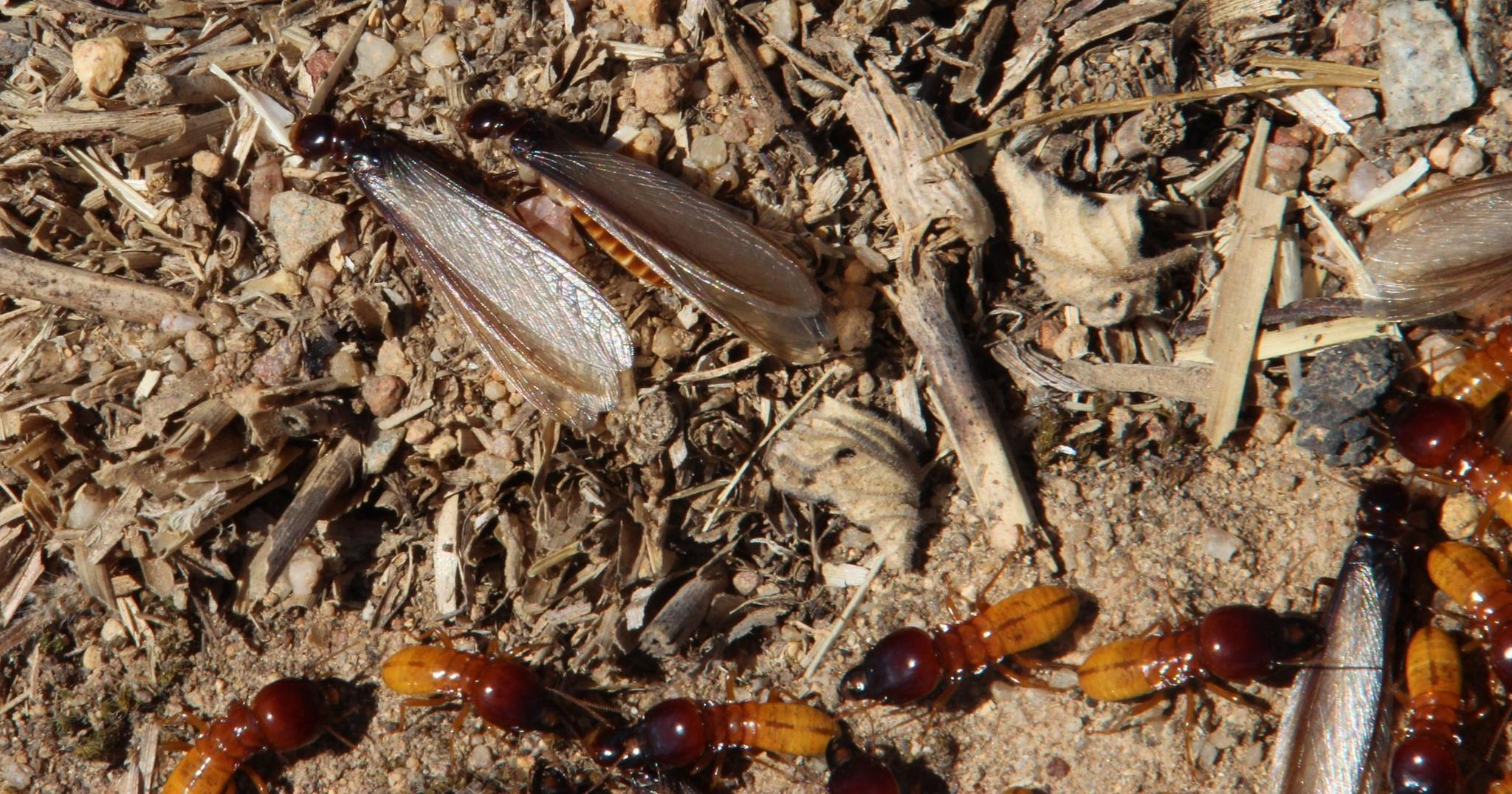
- Microhodotermes viator

Scientific classification
- Kingdom: Animalia
- Phylum: Arthropoda
- Clade: Pancrustacea
- Class: Insecta
- Order: Blattodea
- Infraorder: Isoptera
- Family: Hodotermitidae
- Genus: Microhodotermes; Sjöstedt, 1926

= Microhodotermes =

Genus of termites

Microhodotermes is a genus of southern African harvester termites in the Hodotermitidae. As with harvester termites in general, they have serrated inner edges to their mandibles, and all castes have functional compound eyes. Species of this genus are desert specialists of the Namib, Kalahari and Karoo, where their ranges overlap with Hodotermes.

They forage at night and during daylight hours, and their pigmented workers are often observed outside the nest. The workers of M. viator collect mostly woody material, with Pteronia and vygie species being favoured.

Colonies of M. viator produce initially small, conical mounds on soil with sufficient clay content. These are speculated to cause the formation of increasingly large heuweltjies. Widespread foraging and burrowing activity of aardvarks are associated with heuweltjies inhabited by M. viator.

== Species ==
The genus contains three species:

- Microhodotermes maroccanus (Sjöstedt, 1926)
- Microhodotermes viator (Latreille, 1804)
- Microhodotermes wasmanni (Sjöstedt, 1900)
