= Hodoxenus =

Scientific classification
- Kingdom: Animalia
- Phylum: Arthropoda
- Class: Insecta
- Order: Coleoptera
- Suborder: Polyphaga
- Infraorder: Staphyliniformia
- Family: Staphylinidae
- Subfamily: Aleocharinae
- Tribe: Aleocharini
- Subtribe: Hodoxenina; Kistner, 1970
- Genus: Hodoxenus; Kistner, 1970
- Species: H. sheasbyi

Binomial name
- Hodoxenus sheasbyi Kistner, 1970

Genus of beetles

Hodoxenus is a monotypic genus of rove beetle, containing one species, Hodoxenus sheasbyi, and is the only genus in the subtribe Hodoxenina.

Hodoxenus cohabitates with the termite species Microhodotermes viator, often antennating worker termites and presenting its abdomen to them. The only known location of the species is in the Cape Province in South Africa.
