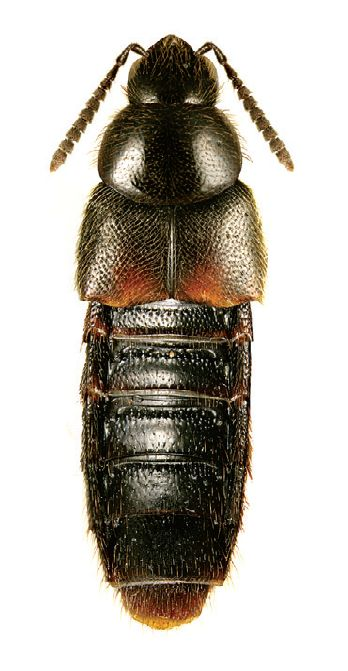
- Aleochara lanuginosa

Scientific classification
- Kingdom: Animalia
- Phylum: Arthropoda
- Clade: Pancrustacea
- Class: Insecta
- Order: Coleoptera
- Suborder: Polyphaga
- Infraorder: Staphyliniformia
- Family: Staphylinidae
- Subfamily: Aleocharinae
- Tribe: Aleocharini; Fleming, 1821

= Aleocharini =

Tribe of beetles

Aleocharini is the type tribe of the subfamily Aleocharinae. It contains three subtribes, Aleocharina, Compactopediina and Hodoxenina. The tribe contains 29 genera and 682 species. The vast majority of biodiversity is distributed in the subtribe Aleocharina, which contains 650 species in 16 genera including 545 species in the genus Aleochara alone.

== Uncategorized genera ==
The following genera are not currently assigned to any of the 3 subtribes of Aleocharini:

- Axiologarthra Pace, 2013
- Borneochara Pace, 2014
- Compsoglossa Bernhauer, 1915
- Eloschara Pace, 2012
- Eydelusa Pace, 1997
- Myrmecosticta Maruyama, 2011
- Oxybessoglossa Pace, 1993
