= Compactopediina =

Scientific classification
- Kingdom: Animalia
- Phylum: Arthropoda
- Clade: Pancrustacea
- Class: Insecta
- Order: Coleoptera
- Suborder: Polyphaga
- Infraorder: Staphyliniformia
- Family: Staphylinidae
- Subfamily: Aleocharinae
- Tribe: Aleocharini
- Subtribe: Compactopediina; Kistner, 1970

Subtribe of beetles

Compactopediina is a subtribe of rove beetles in the tribe Aleocharini. It was first described by Fleming in 1821. It contains 21 accepted species split across five genera. Recorded observations have been made in China and India.

== Genera ==
- Compactopedia
- Discoxenus
- Emersonilla
- Hirsitilla
- Kistnerella
