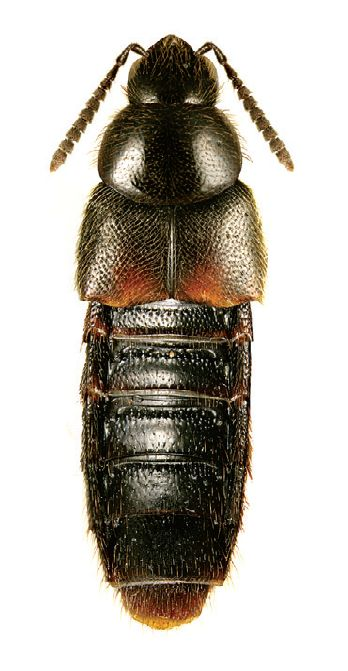
- Aleochara lanuginosa

Scientific classification
- Kingdom: Animalia
- Phylum: Arthropoda
- Class: Insecta
- Order: Coleoptera
- Suborder: Polyphaga
- Infraorder: Staphyliniformia
- Family: Staphylinidae
- Subfamily: Aleocharinae
- Tribe: Aleocharini
- Subtribe: Aleocharina; Fleming, 1821

= Aleocharina =

Subtribe of beetles

Aleocharina is the type subtribe and largest subtribe of the tribe Aleocharini. It contains 650 species in 16 genera. The type genus (Aleochara) contains 545 species and makes up the majority the subtribe, but this classification of the genus is under debate due to difficulties determining its limits. Members of the subtribe are characterized by a 5-5-5 segmented tarsi, but this character is found in many other groups of Aleocharinae.

The subtribe contains the following genera:

- Aleochara Gravenhorst, 1802
- Aleonictus Kistner, 1997
- Amarochara Thomson, 1858
- Formicaenictus Kistner, 1997
- Indiachara Pace, 2012
- Leptogenophilus Kistner, 1975
- Megalogastria Bernhauer, 1901
- Ocyota Sharp, 1883
- Paraleochara Cameron, 1920
- Paroxysmeme Bernhauer, 1928
- Piochardia Heyden, 1870
- Plesiochara Sawada, 1989
- Pseudocalea Luze, 1902
- Rencoma Blackwelder, 1952
- Tetrasticta Kraatz, 1857
- Ystrixoxygymna Pace, 1999
