= Mima mounds =

Geological mound formation

Coordinates: 46.898560°N 123.05048°W

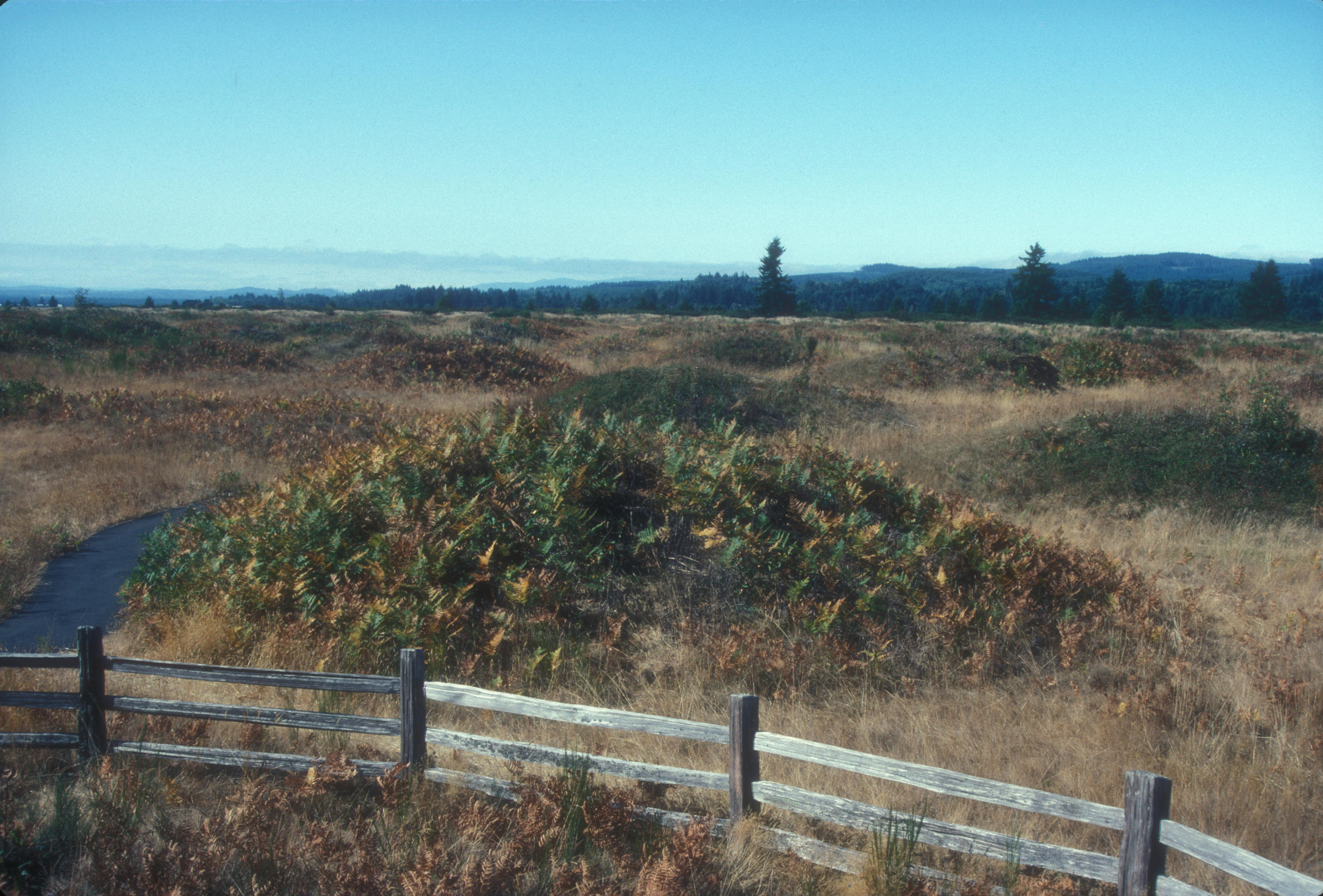
Mima mounds in Washington State

Mima mounds /ˈmaɪmə/ are low, flattened, circular to oval, domelike, natural mounds that are composed of loose, unstratified, often gravelly sediment that is an overthickened A horizon. These mounds range in diameter from 3 m (9.8 ft) to more than 50 m (160 ft); in height 30 cm (12 in) to greater than 2 m (6.6 ft); and in concentration from several to greater than 50 mounds per hectare, at times forming conspicuous natural patterns. Found throughout North America, a preserved cluster of Mima mounds can be seen at the Mima Mounds Natural Area Preserve in Washington state.

"Mima" is a name derived from a Chinook Jargon term meaning "a little further along" or "downstream".

Theories for the origin of Mima mounds include burrowing by pocket gophers; accumulation of wind-blown (aeolian) sediments around vegetation to form coppice dunes or nebkhas; seismic ground shaking by major earthquakes, though none have been observed to form Mima mounds; and shrinking and swelling of clays in hog-wallow or gilgai landforms.

Though the definitive Mima mounds are common in North America, it has not been shown that all North American mounds result from the same causes. Superficially similar phenomena occur on all continents, and the proposed causal factors do not occur in all regions that have been studied. Nor is it clear that all such mounds really are the same, either physically or functionally; for example, the so-called fairy circles of Southern Africa tend to be less mound-like and occur in different climatic and ecological conditions from Mima mounds. Furthermore, it has been argued that the possibly distinct heuweltjies of the South Western Cape region of South Africa are of an origin far different from either.

== Distribution ==
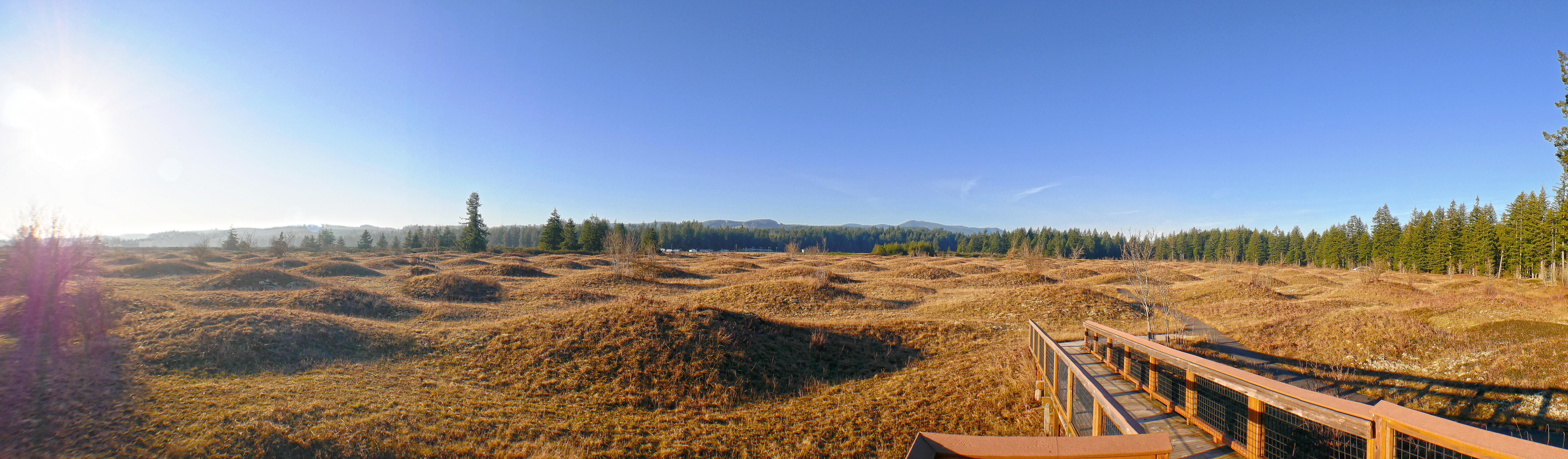
Panorama of Mima mounds in Thurston County

=== Pacific Northwest and southern Cascadia ===
Within the northwestern United States, Mima mounds typically are part of what is commonly known as hog-wallow landscape. This type of landscape typically has a shallow basement layer such as bedrock, hardpan, claypan, or densely bedded gravel.

In the northwestern United States, Mima mounds also occur within landscapes where a permanent water table impedes drainage, creating waterlogged soil conditions for prolonged periods. Mima mounds are named after the Mima Prairie in Thurston County, Washington.

They also are found in south central Oregon, and in western and north central California, where they are typically known as "hogwallow mounds". Within this strip they are often a part of the landscape local to vernal pools.

=== Southwestern U.S. and northwestern Mexico ===
Mima mounds are found in northwest Baja California and adjacent San Diego County, where again they are an integral part of vernal pools' landscape.

Mima mounds occur outside the western coastal North America in three major regions between the Cascade Range, the Sierra Nevada, and the Sierra de Juárez in the west, and the Mississippi River in the east. As described by Cox and by Washburn, these are:

- Mima mounds are found in a roughly north–south strip of the Great Plains containing parts of north central New Mexico, and central Colorado, and central Wyoming, where they are typically called "prairie mounds".
- Mima mounds are found in an area containing parts of east Texas, western Louisiana, southeast Oklahoma, southern Missouri, and most of Arkansas where they are commonly known as either "pimple mounds" or "prairie mounds".
- Isolated patches of Mima mounds also are found in Iowa, eastern North Dakota, and northwest Minnesota.

Within Arkansas, Louisiana, Missouri, Oklahoma, and Texas, pimple mounds, also called locally "prairie mounds" and "natural mounds", consist of low, flattened, circular to oval, domelike, mounds composed of loose, sandy loam or loamy sand. Typically, these mounds consist entirely of a thickened loamy and sandy A and E horizons lying either on a more or less flat or slightly, but noticeably depressed, clay laden B horizon. Pimple mounds range in diameter from 6 m (20 ft) to more than 45 m (148 ft); in height 30 cm (12 in) to greater than 1.2 m (3.9 ft); and in density from several to greater than 425 mounds per hectare.

Unlike the Mima mounds of Oregon and Washington, "pimple mounds" are not limited to the relatively flat and poorly drained surfaces, i.e. late Pleistocene coastal and fluvial terraces: They also occur in abundance of the slopes, summits and crests of hills created by the deep erosion and dissection of unconsolidated and unlithified early Pleistocene and middle Pleistocene, Pliocene, and older coastal plain sediments. In rare cases, pimple mounds that occur on these hillslopes are elongated in the upslope-downslope direction.

== Structure ==
Excavations made into the Washington mounds show that underneath a blanket of prairie grass lies a mixture of loose sand, fine gravel, and decayed plants. Not all mima mound features have the same structure though. One mound in Washington had a very complex soil profile: A horizon is a black sandy loam (due to charcoal content from aboriginal burning on the prairies), B horizon is a gravelly sandy loam, C horizon is an extremely gravelly sand.

== Vernal pools ==
Vernal pools are shallow surficial depressions that seasonally fill with water during winter and spring rains and dry up during dry summer months. They get their name from the recognition of the seasonality of the habitat and the springtime flora associated with them. Vernal pools form where an impermeable or very slowly permeable layer underlies small and shallow depressions and creates a perched water table. The impermeable or very slowly permeable layer typically consists of either soil horizons such as duripans or claypans or bedrock in the form of volcanic mud or lava flows.

Within California, vernal pools are quite commonly associated with Mima Mounds. These Mima Mounds are typically located on stable landforms that are greater than 100,000 years old. These landforms are characterized by strongly developed soils that usually have a relatively impermeable layer (claypan or silcrete duripan) in the subsoil. This impermeable layer locally impedes drainage and creates perched water levels and causes the formation of vernal pools within the intermound depressions that are associated with Mima Mounds. Vernal pools are typically small, shallow, and complex ephemeral wetlands that only have internal drainage because they are hydrologically isolated from perennial inflow by a ring of Mima Mounds. Although the ponded water that fills vernal pools comes and goes throughout the year, it is present at least for a short time in most years.

Within California, however, the mound-depression microrelief associated with Mima Mounds is just one of a variety of geographic settings within which vernal pools occur. For example, in the Modoc Plateau region of California, numerous vernal pools are found on the surface of volcanic mudflows and basalt lava flows where Mima Mounds are completely absent.

== Theories ==
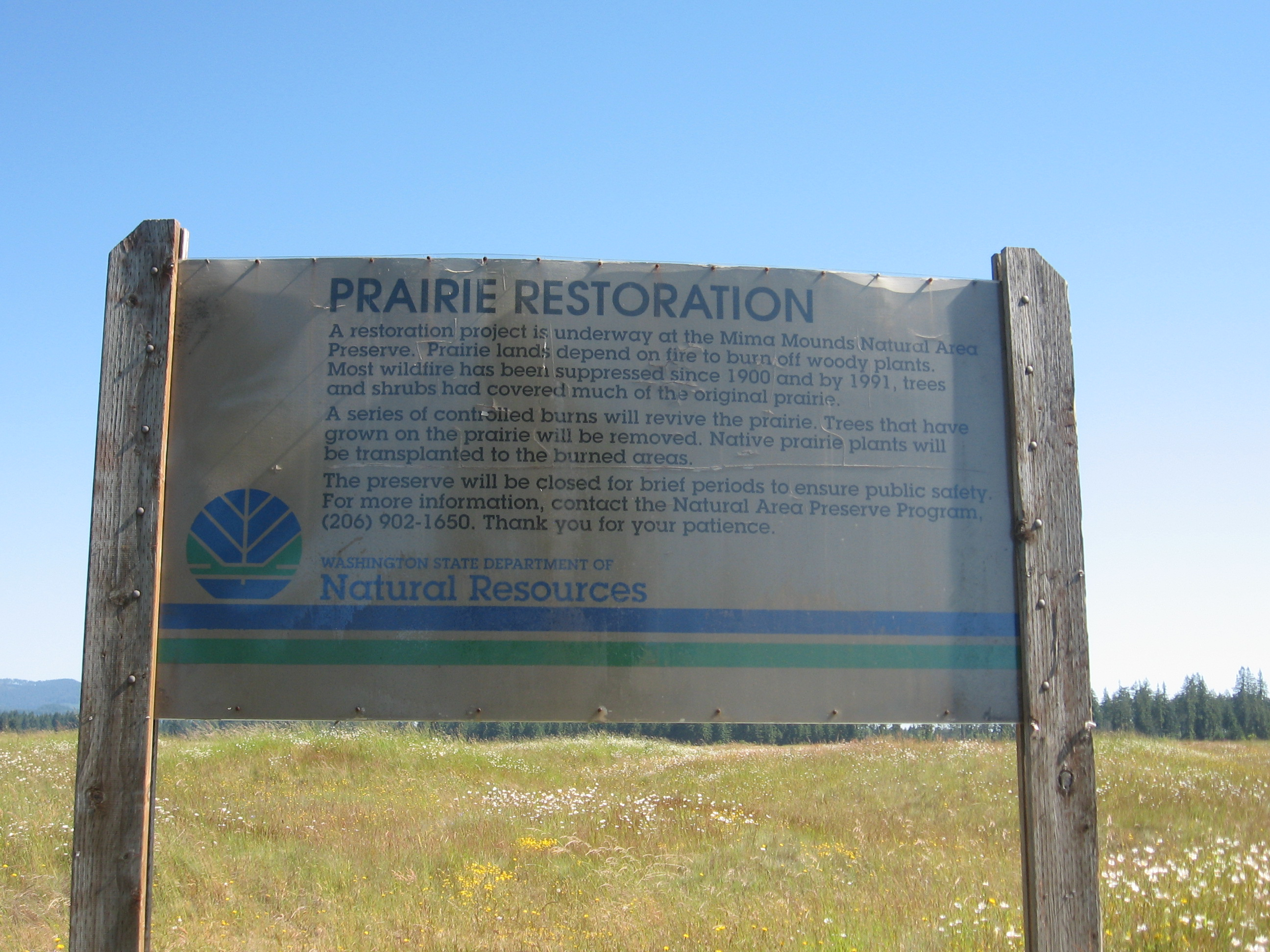
DNR sign at Mima Mounds Natural Area Preserve near Olympia

=== Pocket gophers ===
One theory on the origin of Mima mounds is that they were created by small burrowing rodents such as pocket gophers (Thomomys talpoides) of the endemic North American family Geomyidae. Researchers in the 1940s found that Mima mounds tend to form in areas with poorly draining soils, so the "Fossorial Rodent Hypothesis" proposed that gophers build mounds as an evolutionary response to low water tables. It could be argued that gophers live in the mounds opportunistically but did not build them. Metal tracers implanted in a Mima mound field in San Diego demonstrated that gophers unexpectedly pushed soil upwards towards the center of the mounds instead of pushing the soil downward.

This uphill soil transport contrasts with the typical gopher behavior of pushing soil downhill, but can be overridden when soil is saturated. Consequently, gophers in mima mound fields seem to be aware of randomly distributed topographic highs and orient their burrowing accordingly in early mound creation stages. However, the mounds were already fully formed and the gophers may have just been maintaining them. Nevertheless, the fact that the surface area of a typical Mima mound is similar to the size of an individual gopher's home range is consistent with the theory they were constructed by the rodents.

Results from the tracer study were incorporated into a numerical model that simulated the burrowing behavior of gophers. The advantage of modelling in this case is that

(1) an initially flat surface can be specified, and
(2) time can be sped up.

In the computer simulations, mounds naturally emerged from randomly distributed topographic highs, and reached topographic steady state after several centuries of gopher activity, which could explain why nobody has ever witnessed the growth of one. Once the mound field reaches topographic maturity, the mounds feature more uniform spacing and hexagonal tessellation. Results indicated that formation of these mound fields are largely contributed by positive feedback loops which amplify small features to create large scale patterns, a common facet of self-organization. The slow modeled mound growth rates and their spatial distribution agreed with field observations.

Although occupation of mounds by gophers does not by itself prove that gophers built the mounds since they could be living there opportunistically, to date, this is the strongest evidence for the origin of these enigmatic features. Moreover, the results from the computer model are supported by radiocarbon ages of organic material taken at regular intervals down through the middle of a typical mound in the Mima Mounds Natural Area Preserve (Washington state). These ages confirm that the mounds grow slowly through the accumulation of material, at the rate of about 2.6 cm/yr.

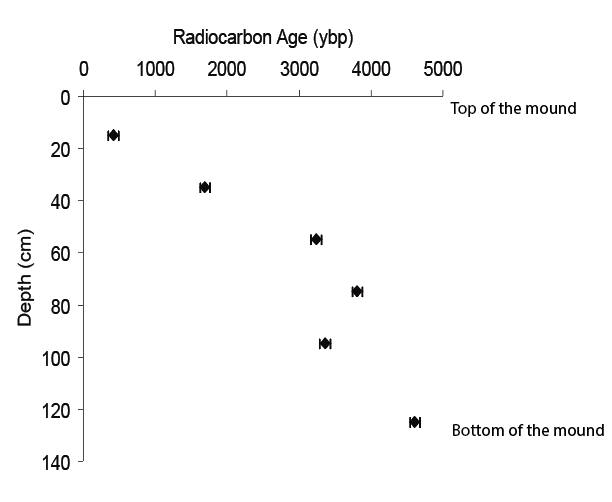
These are radiocarbon ages of organic material recovered down through a typical Mima Mound in the Mima Mound Natural Area Preserve, in Washington. These ages show that the mound began forming about 4600 years ago and grew gradually over time. These results, coupled with the computer model, strongly support the theory that gophers built the mounds.

The publication of this modelling study received attention from the international press.

=== Aeolian origin ===
Another major theory concerning the origin of pimple and prairie mounds argues that they are either coppice dunes or nebkhas formed by the accumulation of wind-blown sediments around clumps of vegetation. For example, based on grain-size data of and optically stimulated luminescence ages obtained from pimple mounds in the south-central United States, Seifert and others concluded that these mounds consisted of wind blown sediments that accumulated during prolonged late Holocene droughts. They suggest that although they superficially resemble the mima mounds of the northwestern United States, the pimple mounds of south-Central United States have a greatly different origin from them.

=== Seismic activity ===
Andrew Berg, a geologist with the U.S. Bureau of Mines in Spokane, proposed that Mima and pimple mounds were the result of very intense ground shaking resulting from major earthquakes. He formulated this hypothesis while building a dog house. As he hammered together sheets of plywood coated with volcanic ash, he noticed that the hammering vibrations caused the ash to heap into small mounds that looked a lot like miniature Mima mounds. From that observation, Berg hypothesized that vibrations from violent earthquakes could have formed the Mima mounds, like vibrations that cause mounds on Chladni plates. According to Berg, the soil on the Mima Prairie is like volcanic ash, and the layer of rock below that is like a plank of wood. When seismic waves move through the hard ground and bump into faults, or large fractures in the ground, the waves bounce backward. Those ricocheted waves collide with other seismic waves from the quake, and between the collision points, the soil rises and forms mounds. Berg claims that Mima mounds occur only in seismically active areas—areas where the ground is unstable and many earthquakes occur. The area where the Washington Mima mounds are found experienced a major earthquake about 1,000 years ago.

However, since this hypothesis has been proposed, there have been many large earthquakes throughout the world and none have been reported to have formed Mima mounds. In addition, Mima mounds have been gradually growing on the Carrizo Plain (California) since the 1980s when plowing of the fields was halted. These mounds have been forming in the absence of any large earthquakes. Furthermore, Berg's experiments were done using dry cohesionless sediment; when these experiments are attempted with moist sediment (i.e., similar to real soils), mounds do not form. Finally, radiocarbon ages of organic material taken at regular intervals down through the middle of a typical mound in the Mima Mounds Natural Area Preserve (Washington) showed that the mound formed gradually over time, at the rate of about 2.6 cm/yr and, thus, could not have formed during a single event, like an earthquake. Therefore, there is no realistic experimental evidence or geological evidence supporting the 'earthquake' hypothesis.

=== Shrinking and swelling of clays ===
When clay is exposed to large amounts of water, the water collects between the clay minerals (which are flat planes). Due to the shape of the minerals, the water travels in between the compacted layer, thus "swelling" the clay-bed into mound-like features. Silts are also related with this geomorphologic feature; however, silt is coarser-grained sediment so the minerals do not "hold" water in the same way. Silt is more penetrable than clay is. Shrink/swell soils are most often related to landforms called "hog wallows" or "gilgai" that can look similar to mima mounds.

=== Glaciers ===
Regina Johnson, with the Washington Department of Natural Resources (which oversees the Mima Mounds Natural Area Preserve), claimed that the mounds were formed by glacial processes. However, radiocarbon ages of organic material taken at regular intervals down through the middle of a typical mound in the Mima Mounds Natural Area Preserve (Washington) showed that the mound began forming approximately 4600 years ago, long after the retreat of the glaciers. In addition, the ages demonstrated that the mound grew gradually over time through the accumulation of material, which supports the gopher hypothesis.

=== Nature paper ===
In 2017, Corina Tarnita and several of her colleagues published a paper in Nature which explained these and other related self-organised vegetation patterns by means of a general theory which integrates scale-dependent feedbacks and the activities of subterranean ecosystem engineers such as termites, ants, and rodents.

== Washington ==
The phenomenon can be seen at the Mima Mounds Natural Area Preserve, a designated National Natural Landmark near Capitol State Forest in Thurston County, Washington. Mima mounds are also present at the Scatter Creek Unit and Rocky Prairie, located in southern Thurston County, Washington.

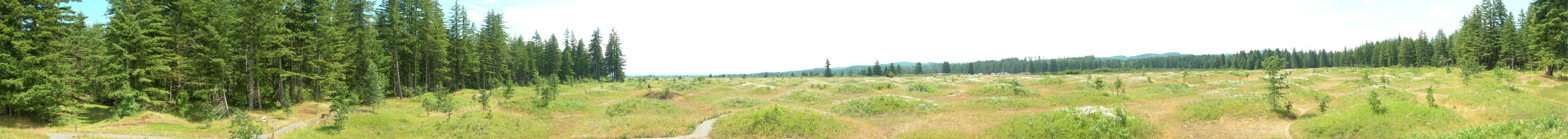
Panorama of Mima mounds near Olympia, Washington

== See also ==
- Fairy circle (arid grass formation) – Circular patches of land without vegetation but circled by growing grass in arid areas
- Stone stripe – Type of rock formation
- Drumlin – Elongated hill formed by glacial action
