= Journal of Arid Environments =

- Discipline: Ecology, environmental science
- Language: English
- Edited by: Lixin Wang

Publication details
- History: 1978–present
- Publisher: Elsevier (United Kingdom)
- Frequency: Bimonthly
- Open access: Hybrid
- Impact factor: 2.5 (2025)

Standard abbreviations
- ISO 4: J. Arid Environ.

Indexing
- ISSN: 0140-1963 (print); 1095-922X (web)

Links
- Journal homepage

The Journal of Arid Environments is a bimonthly peer-reviewed scientific journal published by Elsevier. The journal was established in 1978 and was first published by Academic Press. It covers research on the scientific, environmental, ecological, and human–environment aspects of the world's drylands, including hyper-arid, arid, semi-arid, and dry subhumid environments, in the past, present, and future. According to the Journal Citation Reports, the journal has a 2025 impact factor of 2.5.

== History ==
The journal was founded in 1978 by the zoologist John Cloudsley-Thompson of Birkbeck College, who was also its editor-in-chief until 1997. In 1998, Chuck F. Hutchinson of the University of Arizona and Walter G. Whitford of the United States Environmental Protection Agency were named as executive editors. Lixin Wang became the editor-in-chief in 2024.

== Abstracting and indexing ==
The journal is abstracted and indexed in:

- Biological Abstracts
- BIOSIS Previews
- Current Contents/Agriculture, Biology & Environmental Sciences
- Essential Science Indicators
- Science Citation Index Expanded
- Scopus
- Zoological Record
