= Lixin Wang =

Ecohydrologist and professor in Indiana

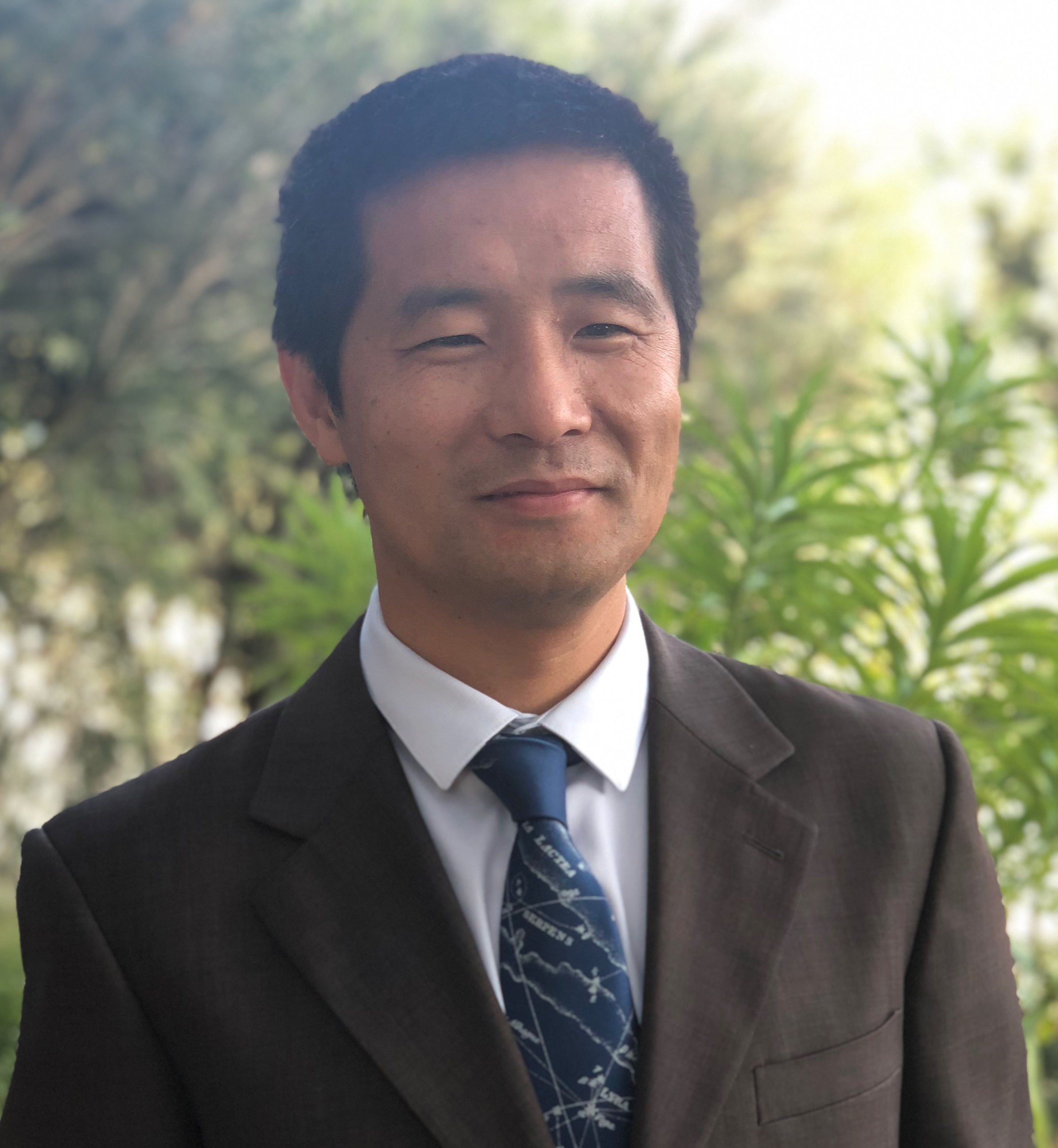
- Lixin Wang in 2021
- Born: Chengde
- Education: Hebei University (BS), University of North Carolina at Greensboro (MS), University of Virginia (Ph.D.)
- Scientific career
- Fields: Ecohydrology, Biogeochemistry
- Workplaces: Indiana University Indianapolis
- Thesis: (2008)
- Doctoral advisors: Stephen Macko, Paolo D'Odorico

Lixin Wang is an ecohydrologist and a professor at Indiana University Indianapolis. With a focus on the complex interactions between water, vegetation and soil nutrients.

Wang's research investigates how these elements respond to climate change and human activities over time.

== Career and research ==
Employing a multifaceted approach, Wang employs stable isotopes, greenhouse experiments, field observations, data syntheses, remote sensing, and modeling to unravel the complexities of ecohydrology and provide solutions for a sustainable future. Specifically, Wang investigates the underlying hydrological drivers of ecological changes in global drylands, the impact of environmental changes (e.g., drought and soil biogeochemical changes) on vegetation water use and carbon cycling as well as the interactions between agricultural resilience and climate variabilities.

Lixin Wang joined Indiana University-Purdue University Indianapolis (IUPUI) (now renamed Indiana University Indianapolis) as an assistant professor in 2013, and he was promoted to full professor in July 2022. His scholarly contributions extend beyond teaching and research, as he serves as an editor/associate editor for several international journals. Wang is the editor-in-chief of the Journal of Arid Environments. Wang is the editor of Hydrology and Earth System Sciences (HESS) and an associate editor of the Journal of Hydrology. He also serves on the editorial board of Scientific Data. He served as an associate editor for Geophysical Research Letters between 2011 and 2015. With his exceptional expertise in the field, Wang is frequently invited to review manuscripts for a wide range of top-tier international journals, including Hydrology and Earth System Sciences, Science, Science Advances, Nature, Nature Climate Change, Nature Geoscience, Nature Sustainability, New Phytologist, and Journal of Hydrology. Furthermore, he contributes his valuable insights as a grant reviewer for multiple federal funding agencies, such as the United States Department of Agriculture and the National Science Foundation. Wang has supervised five postdoctoral researchers, advised six Ph.D. students, four MS students as well as numerous ungraduated students and high school students.

== Awards ==
- Clarivate Highly Cited Researcher, (2023) ,(2024)
- President's Bicentennial Medal (2021), Indiana University
- Open Education Award (2021), IUPUI
- School of Science Innovative Educator Award ( 2021), IUPUI
- Research Trailblazer Award (2020), IUPUI
- Celebration of Teaching and Engaged Learning Honoree (2020), IUPUI
- School of Science Research Award (pre-tenure) (2016), IUPUI
- National Science Foundation CAREER Award ( 2016), NSF
- Vice-Chancellor's Postdoctoral Research Fellowship (2011), UNSW
- Arthur A. Pegau Award (2006), University of Virginia
- Joseph K. Roberts Award (2006), University of Virginia

== Selected publications ==
- Wang, Lixin; Jiao, Wenzhe; MacBean, Natasha; Rulli, Maria; Manzoni, Stefano; Vico, Giulia; D'Odorico, Paolo (2022). "Dryland productivity under a changing climate". Nature Climate Change. 12 (11): 981–994. doi:10.1038/s41558-022-01499-y. S2CID 253400689.
- Jiao, W.†; Wang*, L.; Smith, W.; Chang, Q.; Wang, H.; D'Odorico, Paolo (2021). "Observed increasing water constraint on vegetation growth over the last three decades". Nature Communications. 12 (1): 3777. doi:10.1038/s41467-021-24016-9. PMC 8213694. PMID 34145253. †PhD student author, *corresponding author
- Kaseke, K.†; Wang*, L.; Seely, M. (2017). "Non-rainfall water origins and formation mechanisms". Science Advances. 3 (3) e1603131. doi:10.1126/sciadv.1603131. PMC 5362184. PMID 28345058. †PhD student author, *corresponding author
- Wang, Lixin; Good, Stephen; Caylor, Kelly (2014). "Global synthesis of vegetation control on evapotranspiration partitioning". Geophysical Research Letters. 41 (19): 6753–6757. doi:10.1002/2014GL061439. hdl:1805/5923. S2CID 128588894.
- Wang, Lixin; D'Odorico, Paolo (2008). "The limits of water pumps". Science. 321 (5885): 36–37. doi:10.1126/science.321.5885.36c. PMID 18599757. S2CID 32497371.
