= Titaniidae =

Scientific classification
- Kingdom: Animalia
- Phylum: Arthropoda
- Class: Malacostraca
- Order: Isopoda
- Suborder: Oniscidea
- Family: Titaniidae

Family of crustaceans

Titaniidae is a family of crustaceans belonging to the order Isopoda.

Genera:

- Antidorcasia Kensley, 1971
- Coatonia Kensley, 1971
- Kogmania Barnard, 1932
- Phylloniscus Purcell, 1903
- Titana Budde-Lund, 1909
