= Heuweltjie =

Class of soil surface feature

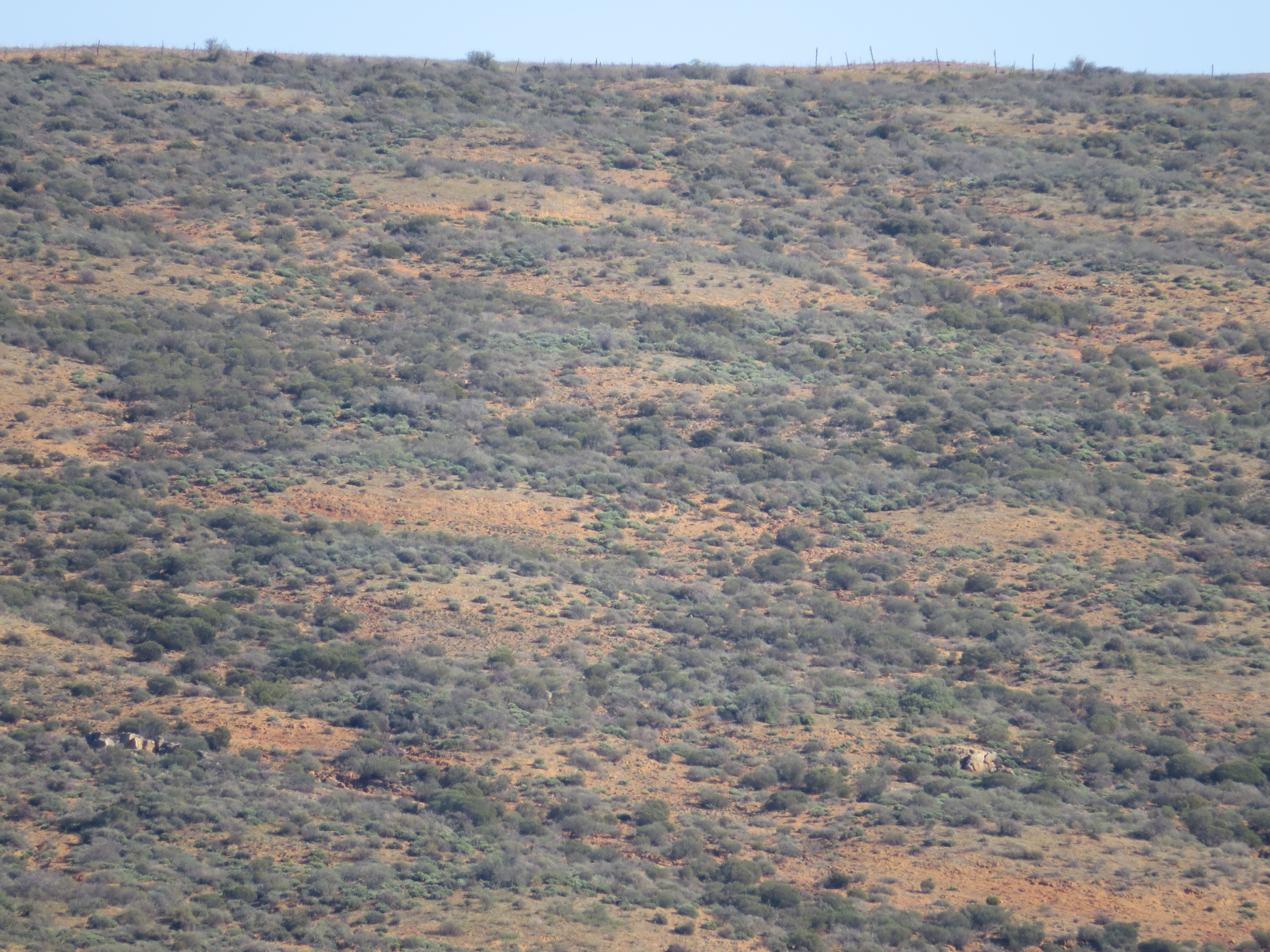
Detail of heuweltjies near Klawer, showing typical denuded surface

Heuweltjies are large mounds above or near the surface of the landscape, a type of soil surface feature that occurs widely in the south-western Cape of South Africa. Their formation has been the subject of a wide range of speculation and debate.

== Etymology ==
The Afrikaans word heuweltjie comes from the Dutch word heuveltje 'hillock, small hill'.

== Description ==
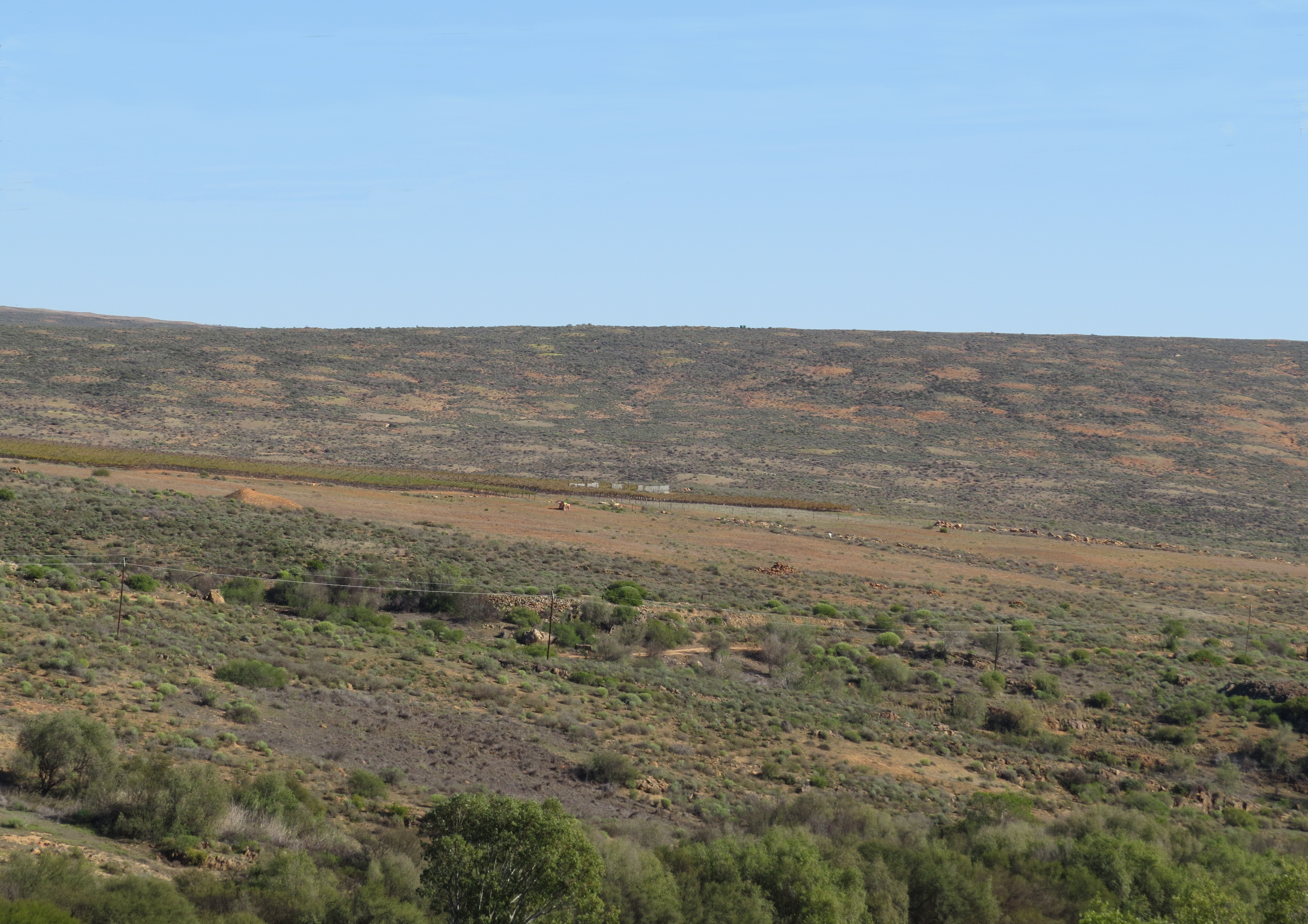
Heuweltjies near Klawer, Northwestern Cape Province of South Africa

Heuweltjies are large mounds above or near the surface of the landscape. Like other phenomena, such as Mima mounds and fairy circles, from which they have been poorly distinguished, particularly in early literature, they have been the subject of a wide range of speculation and of debate that has not yet been settled conclusively.

== Causes ==
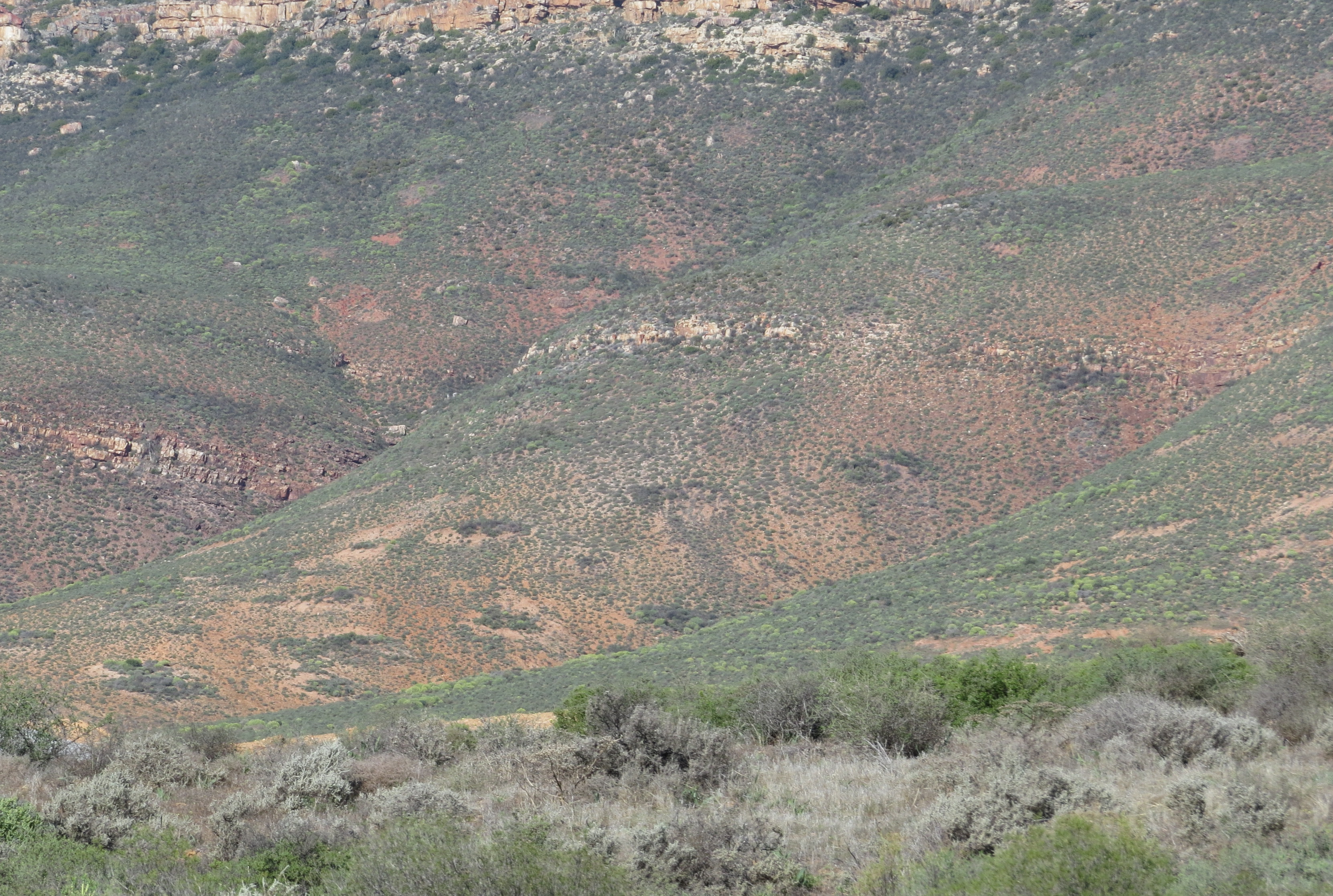
Heuweltjies showing invasion by vegetation

It is quite certain that not all types of heuweltjies have the same cause and nature. For one thing, the various organisms and circumstances that have been proposed to cause them do not occur throughout their range. For another, they differ in nature; some for example have been seen as improving soil fertility, an opinion documented at least as long ago as the early 20th century.

Possible theories and discussions on the topic include the following:

=== Fossil termite mounds ===
One theory is that heuweltjies are fossil termite mounds. Within this hypothesis, there are two conflicting opinions on the origins of heuweltjies, one maintaining that heuweltjies were built by the harvester termite Microhodotermes viator, the other that heuweltjies were built by a now possibly extinct termite species. The earliest radiocarbon dates on heuweltjies suggest an age of about 30,000 or even 40,000 B.P.

=== Mole-rats and/or termites ===
Another theory is that heuweltjies are created by burrowing (fossorial) animals. Variants of this hypothesis are that the animals are mole-rats in the families Bathyergidae and Rhizomyinae; termites; or a combination of mole-rats and termites. In a review paper, Walter Whitford and Fenton Kay state that while the mounds appear to have been created by termites, mammals (aardvarks) partially maintain the mounds by feeding on and living in them. They show a (log-log) correlation between the surface area of mounds including Mima mounds, badger digs, bison wallows, mole-rat, prairie-dog and banner-tail kangaroo rat mounds, with the longevity of the disturbance ('biopedturbation', i.e. disturbance of soil by living agents including animals, roots, etc.): a heuweltjie of 100–1000 square metres is 1000–10,000 years old.

=== Differential erosion ===
Yet another theory is that heuweltjies are caused by differential erosion in places where the availability of water limits the growth of vegetation, creating natural patterns such as tiger bush. In favour of this theory, Michael Cramer and his colleagues note that heuweltjies contain at least ten times more soil than any termite nests in South Africa, and that they can occur on bedrock, which termites could not be tunnelling through to move soil upwards. Further, the heuweltjies had the same spatial distribution as bush-clumps, patches of woody vegetation forming patterns. They suggest that heuweltjies formed from bush-clumps as these protected the soil from eroding away, producing calcrete hardpans.

=== Ecosystem theory ===
In 2017 Corina Tarnita and colleagues published a paper in Nature which explained these and other related self-organised vegetation patterns by means of a general theory which integrates scale-dependent feedbacks and the activities of subterranean ecosystem engineers such as termites, ants, and rodents.

== Effects ==
Heuweltjies modify their local environment, creating a patchwork of habitats in the Nama Karoo ecosystem. Soils in heuweltjies are finer-grained, contain more water, and are more alkaline than surrounding soils, and they support differing animal and plant communities. Both aardvark and steenbok use heuweltjies as dung middens; they are often colonised by Brant's whistling rats (Parotomys brantsii); and sheep graze and leave dung on them.

== See also ==
- Fairy circle (Africa)
- Hodotermitidae
- Mima mounds
- Patterns in nature
