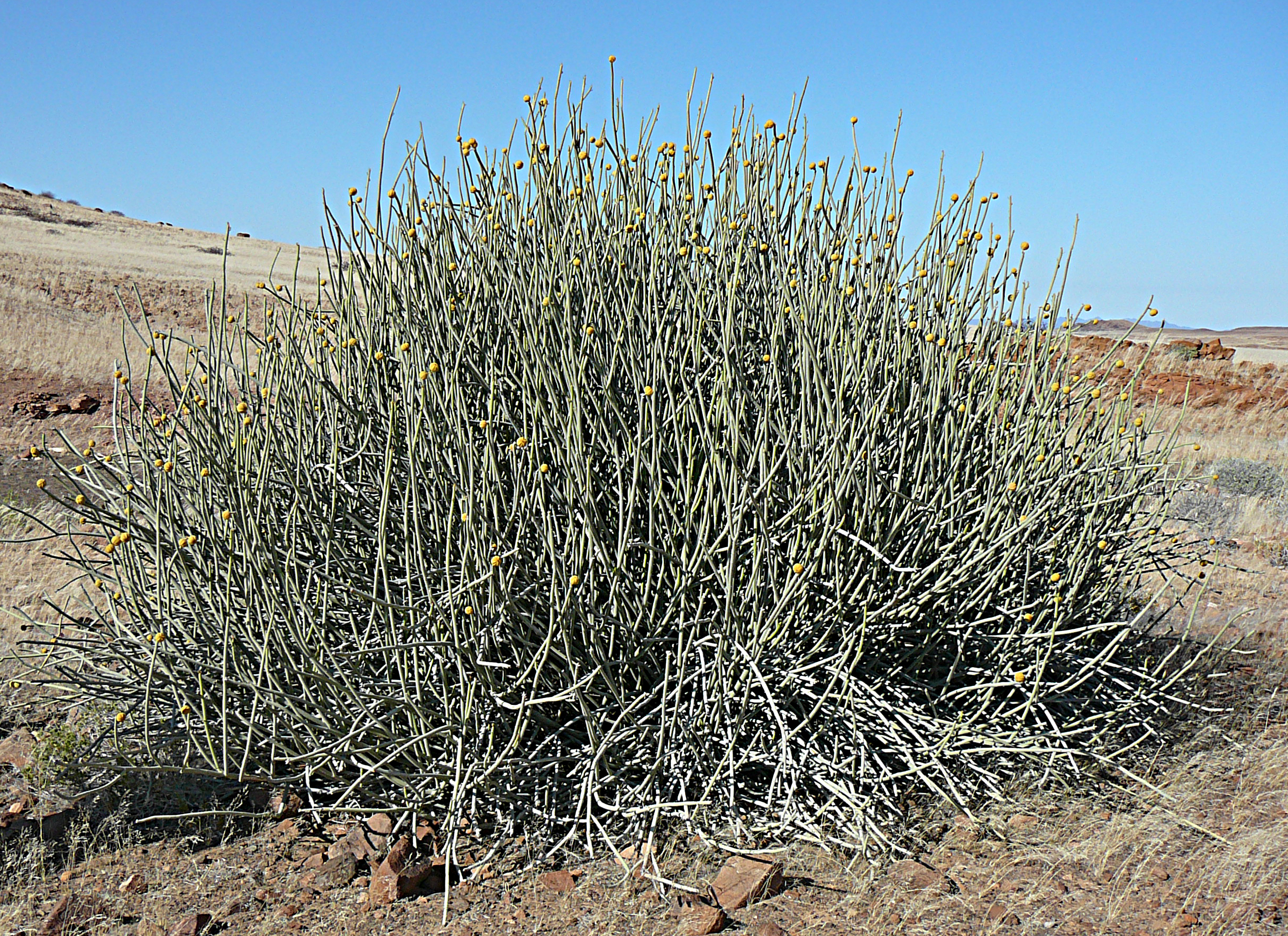
- Bush in Namibia
- CITES Appendix II

Scientific classification
- Kingdom: Plantae
- Clade: Tracheophytes
- Clade: Angiosperms
- Clade: Eudicots
- Clade: Rosids
- Order: Malpighiales
- Family: Euphorbiaceae
- Genus: Euphorbia
- Species: E. damarana

Binomial name
- Euphorbia damarana L.C.Leach

= Euphorbia damarana =

Species of plant

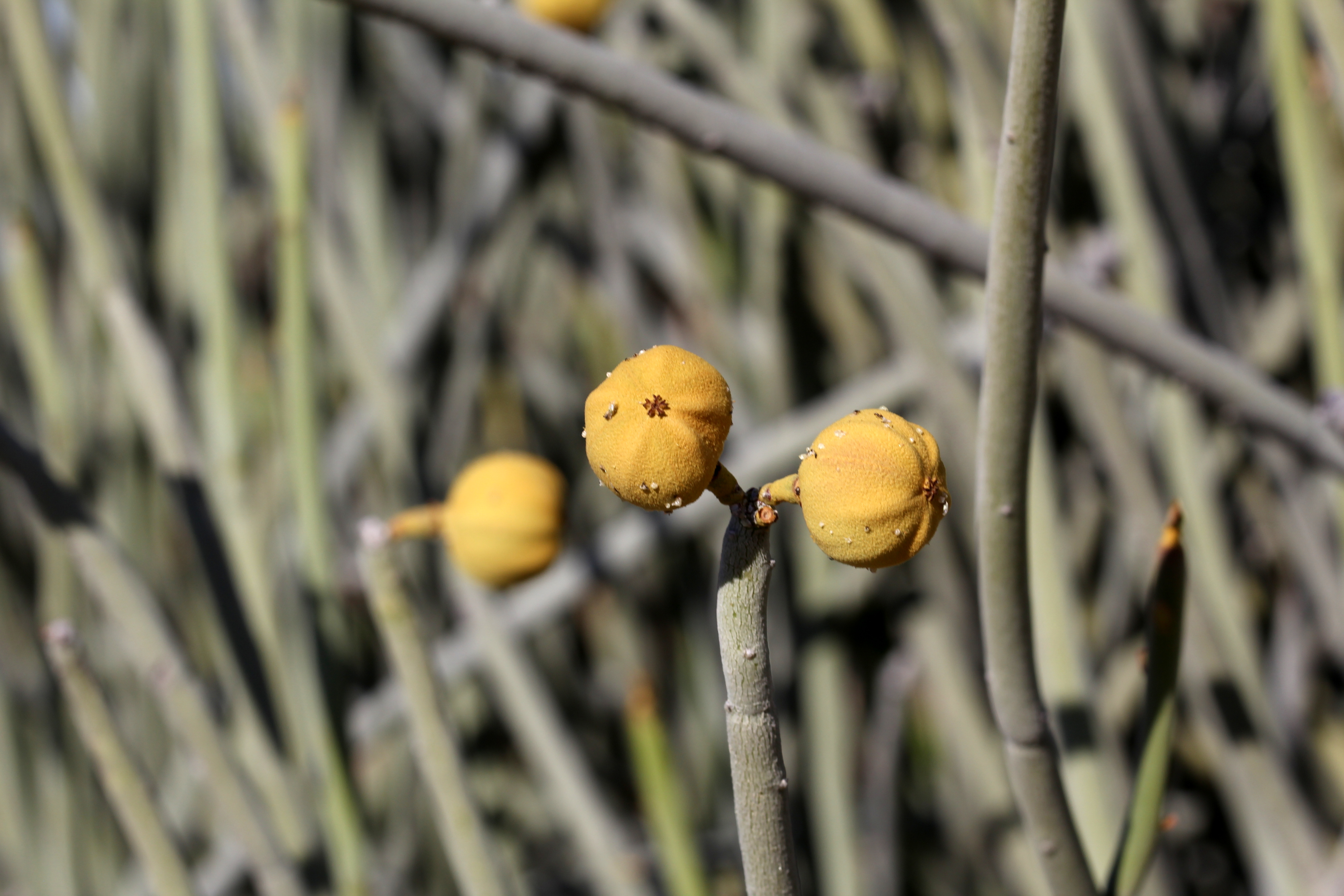
Euphorbia damarana - MHNT

Euphorbia damarana also known as Damara milk-bush and locally as melkbos is a species of flowering plant native to Namibia.

== Taxonomy ==
Euphorbia damarana was described by Leslie Charles Leach and published in Bothalia 11: 500. 1975.

== Appearance ==
The plant consists of slender and grey stems growing up to a height of 2.5 meters. Yellow-brown capsules appear at the tips of the plant during the fruiting season. The plants may not bear fruit as individual plants are either male or female.

== Toxicity ==
The plant is regarded as one of the most toxic plants in Namibia, but specific studies into its toxicity are not known. It has been reported that the toxic milky latex of the plant is capable of killing animals and humans except rhino and oryx who feed upon it. It has been reported that if you have an open wound and come into contact with the plant its poison could kill you. Another story implicated it in the deaths of 11 Oshiwambo-speaking miners at the Uis Tin Mine after consuming food cooked over a fire of Euphorbia damarana.

A noted use is to contaminate watering holes with the plant's latex to poison and catch game which drink from the watering hole. The plant's toxic latex is highly irritating to skin and mucous membranes.
