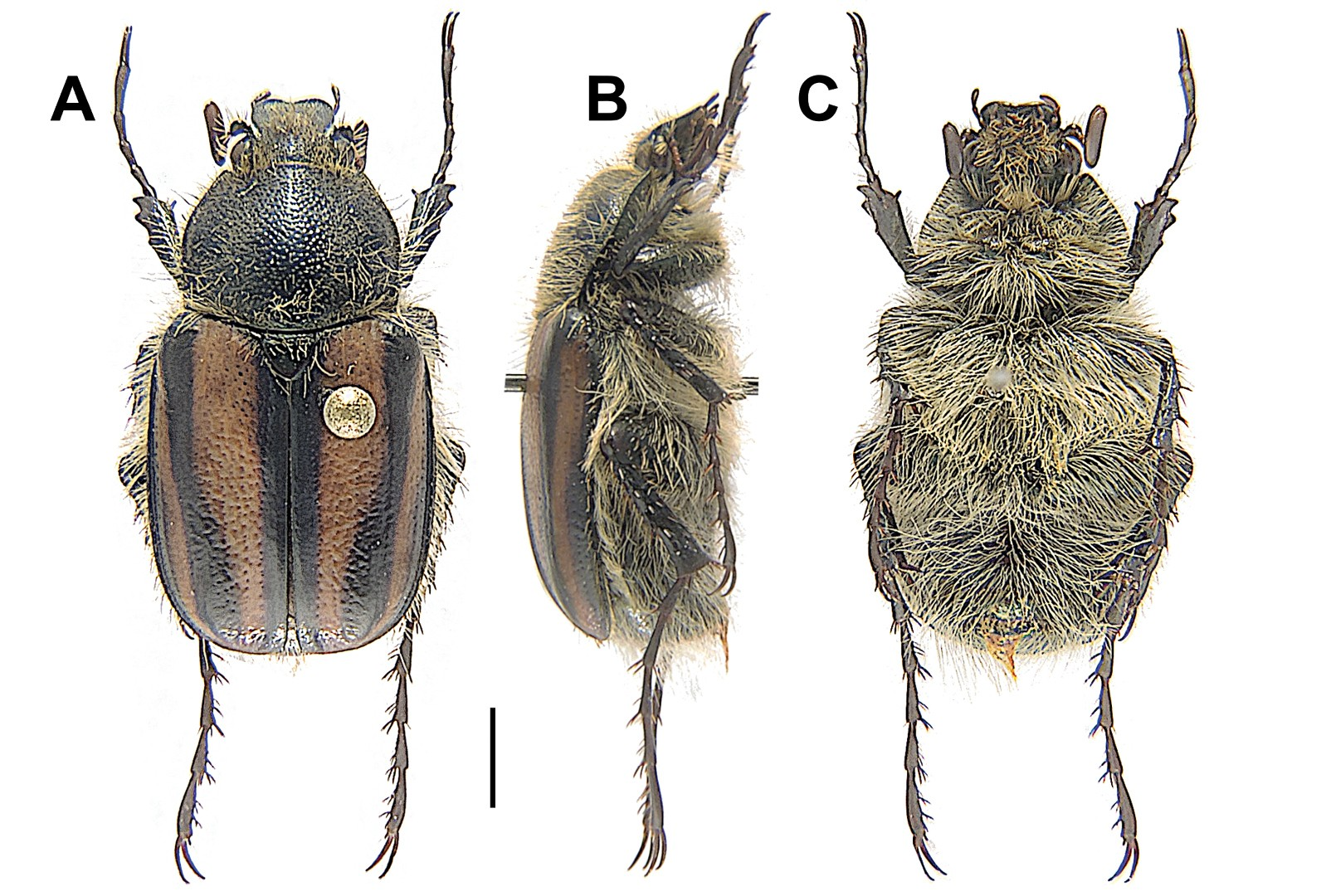

Scientific classification
- Kingdom: Animalia
- Phylum: Arthropoda
- Clade: Pancrustacea
- Class: Insecta
- Order: Coleoptera
- Suborder: Polyphaga
- Infraorder: Scarabaeiformia
- Family: Scarabaeidae
- Genus: Stegopterus
- Species: S. langebergicus

Binomial name
- Stegopterus langebergicus Ricchiardi, Perissinotto & Strümpher, 2025

= Stegopterus langebergicus =

Species of beetle

Stegopterus langebergicus is a species of beetle of the family Scarabaeidae. It is found in South Africa (Western Cape). It appears to be restricted to the central Langeberg section, between the towns of Swellendam to the south and Barrydale to the north.

== Description ==
Adults reach a length of about 15.3 mm (0.60 in). They have a stocky body with a melolonthinoid shape. They are black, with some green metallic hue on the head, pronotum, scutellum, pygidium and abdomen. The antennal scape and legs are black, but the antennal segments and clubs as well as tarsi are brownish. The elytra are fulvous with the lateral margins fringed with a black band fading towards apex. A large black band also borders the sutural and juxtascutellar margins and a striking black band joins the anterior external corner of the elytra to the anteapical humbone. The humeral humbones are prominent.

== Etymology ==
The species name refers to the Langeberg range, where it has been recorded thus far.
