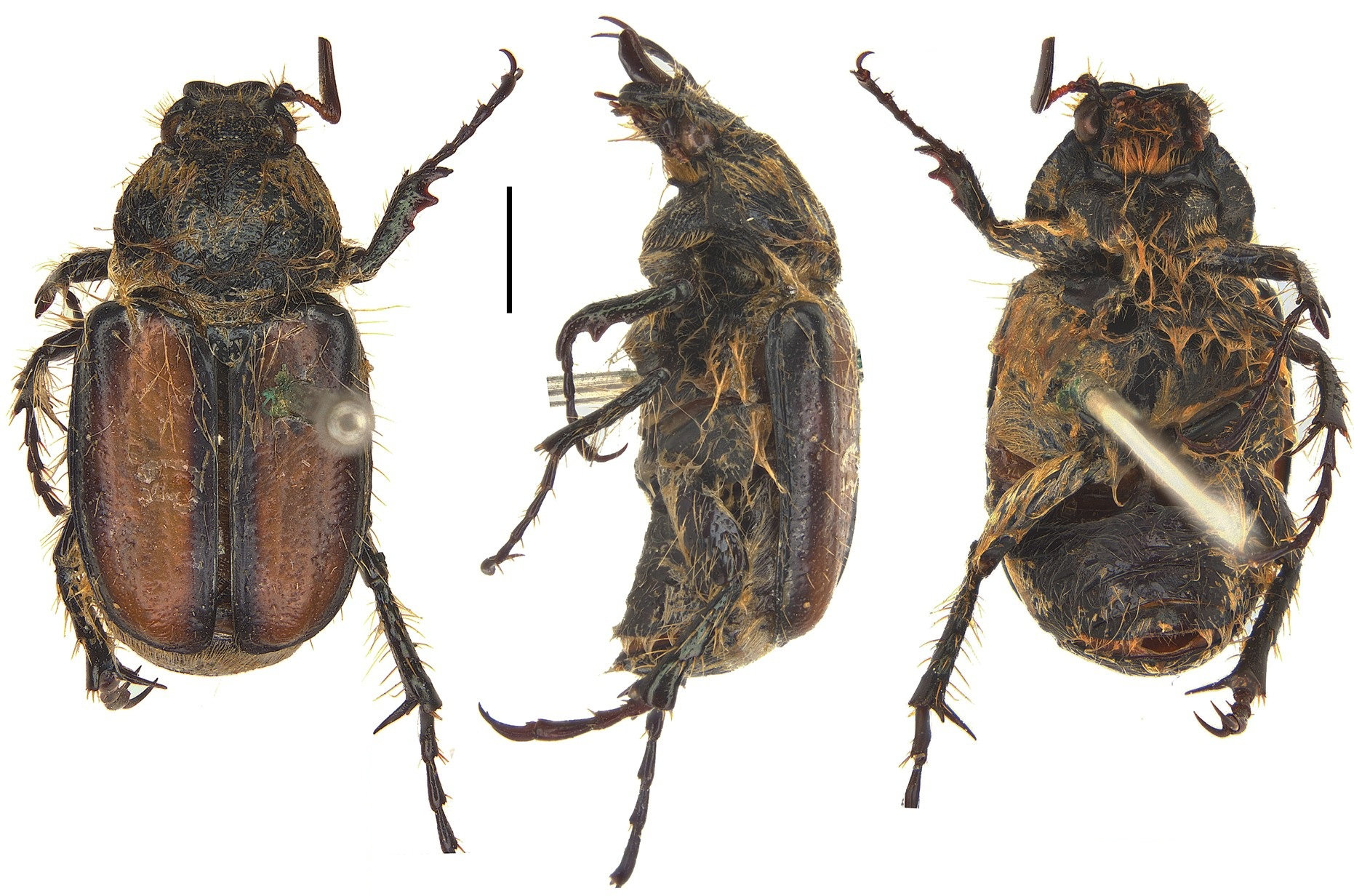

Scientific classification
- Kingdom: Animalia
- Phylum: Arthropoda
- Clade: Pancrustacea
- Class: Insecta
- Order: Coleoptera
- Suborder: Polyphaga
- Infraorder: Scarabaeiformia
- Family: Scarabaeidae
- Genus: Stegopterus
- Species: S. septus

Binomial name
- Stegopterus septus Burmeister & Schaum, 1840

= Stegopterus septus =

Species of beetle

Stegopterus septus is a species of beetle of the family Scarabaeidae. It is found in South Africa (Western Cape), where it is thought to inhabit the mountain area between the towns of Somerset West and Grabouw.
