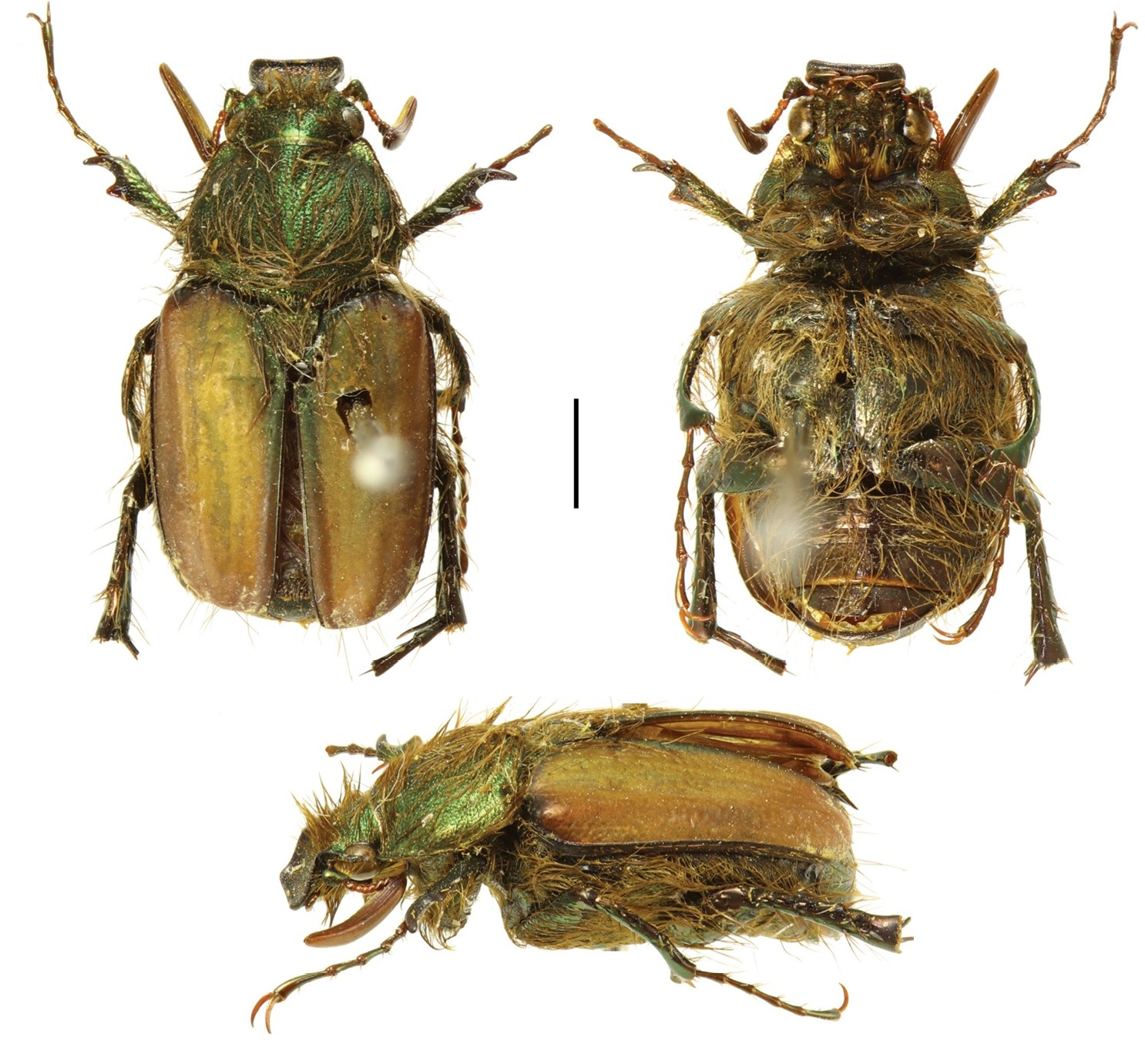

Scientific classification
- Kingdom: Animalia
- Phylum: Arthropoda
- Clade: Pancrustacea
- Class: Insecta
- Order: Coleoptera
- Suborder: Polyphaga
- Infraorder: Scarabaeiformia
- Family: Scarabaeidae
- Genus: Stegopterus
- Species: S. paardebergi

Binomial name
- Stegopterus paardebergi Ricchiardi, Perissinotto & Strümpher, 2025

= Stegopterus paardebergi =

Species of beetle

Stegopterus paardebergi is a species of beetle of the family Scarabaeidae. It is found in South Africa (Western Cape). It appears to be restricted to the isolated Perdeberg peak, situated in the highly developed Boland region between the towns of Paarl and Malmesbury.

== Description ==
Adults reach a length of about 11.4 mm (0.45 in). They have a stocky body with a melolonthinoid shape. They are black, with a greenish metallic hue on the head vertex, pronotum and legs. The clypeus is black, with a metallic reddish-copper band along the anterior margin and the scutellum is black with a reddish-copper metallic hue. The antennae are brownish and the elytra testaceous, with the sutural and juxtascutellar margins fringed with a black band and a greenish metallic hue in the anterior half, but dark testaceous posteriorly. The humeral humbones are prominent.

== Etymology ==
The species name refers to the name of the locality (Paardeberg) where the holotype specimen was collected.
