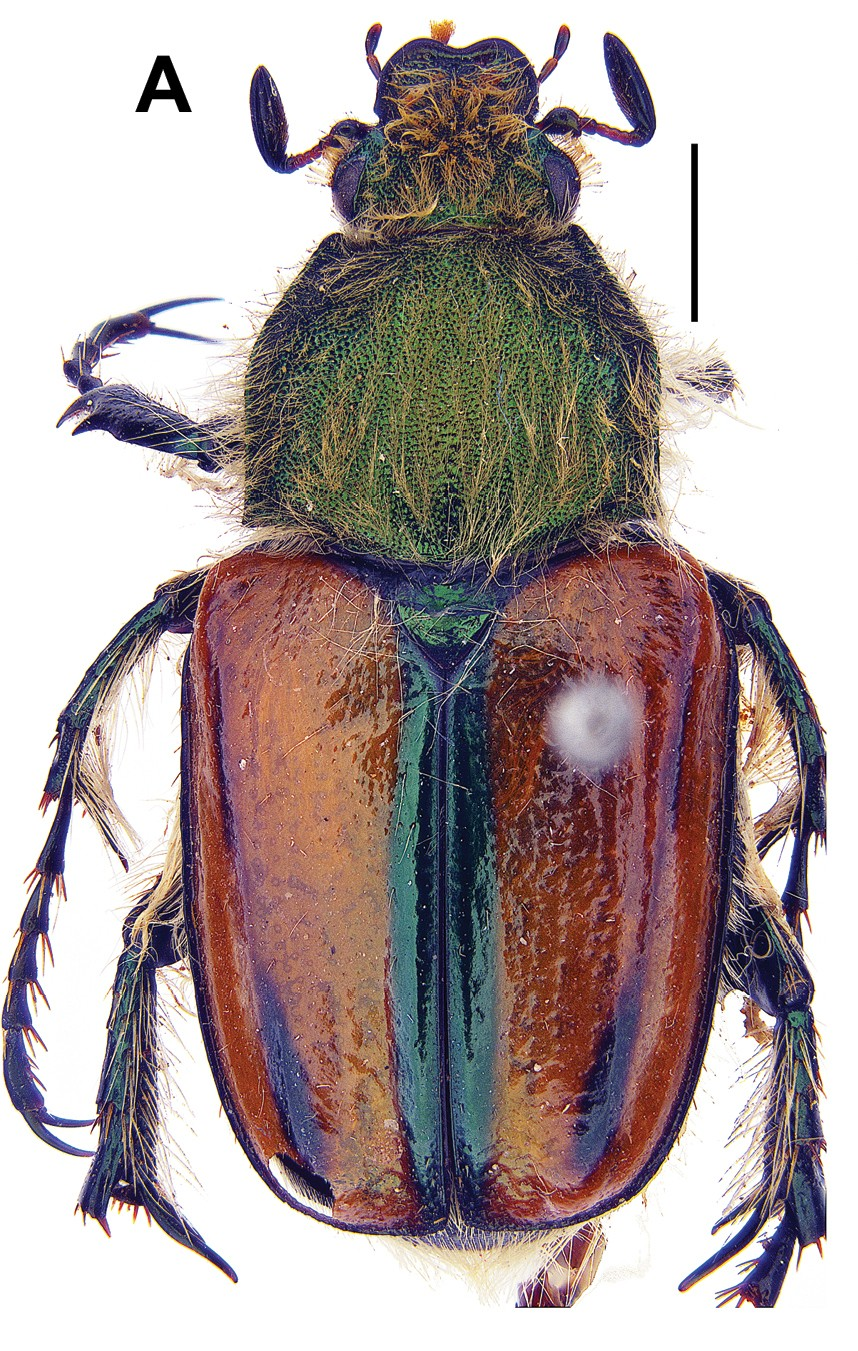
- Male
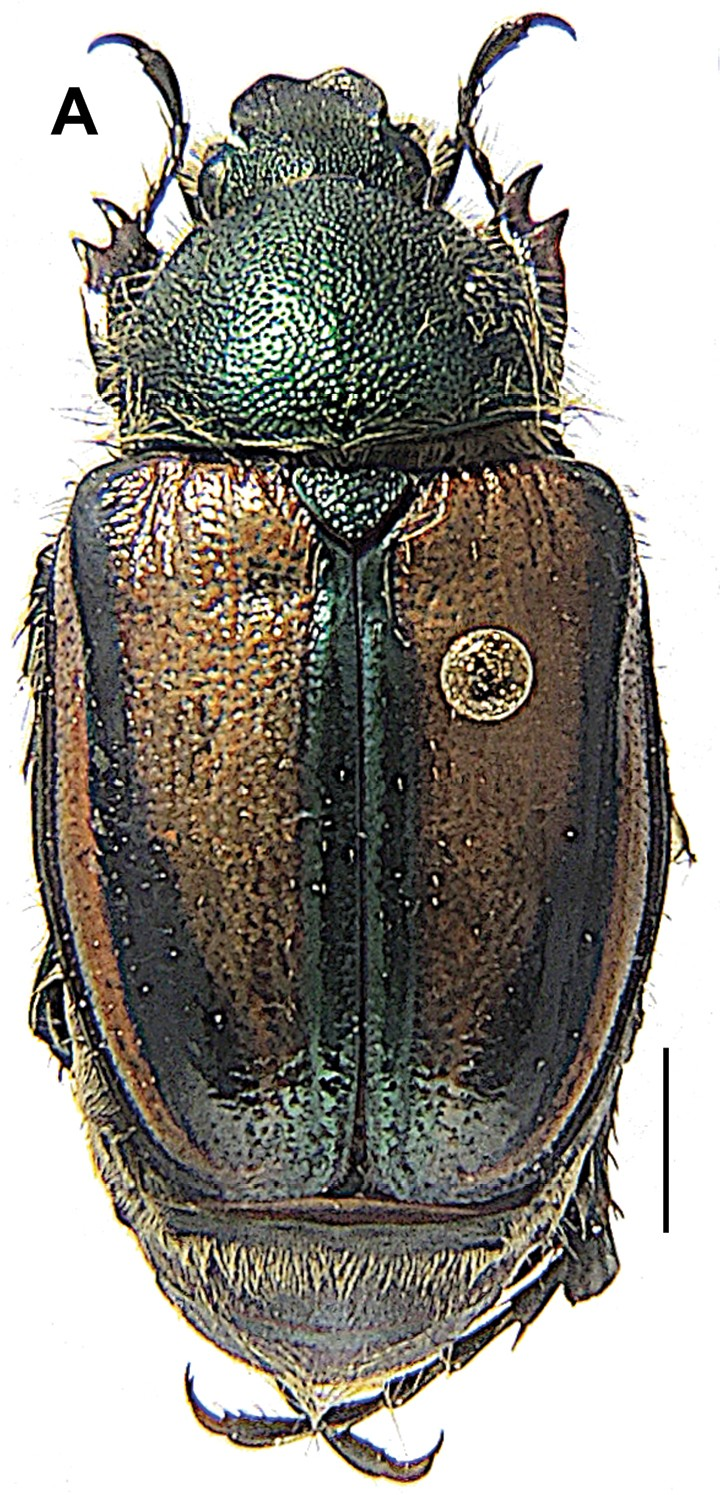
- Female

Scientific classification
- Kingdom: Animalia
- Phylum: Arthropoda
- Clade: Pancrustacea
- Class: Insecta
- Order: Coleoptera
- Suborder: Polyphaga
- Infraorder: Scarabaeiformia
- Family: Scarabaeidae
- Genus: Stegopterus
- Species: S. vittatus

Binomial name
- Stegopterus vittatus (Fabricius, 1775)

Synonyms
- Cetonia vittata Fabricius, 1775; Melolontha surinamensis Herbst, 1790; Melolontha zebra Olivier, 1789; Scarabaeus tomentosus DeGeer, 1778

= Stegopterus vittatus =

Species of beetle

Stegopterus vittatus, the mint humbug bumblingbee beetle, is a species of beetle of the family Scarabaeidae. It is found in South Africa (Western Cape). Its range spans the entire lowland region, stretching from Cape Point in the south to Lamberts Bay on the west coast.

== Description ==
Adults reach a length of about 13–17.5 mm (0.51–0.69 in). They are metallic green, with the elytra flavescent with on each side a fuscous longitudinal, somewhat narrow infuscate band reaching from the shoulder to the apex, the outer margin is also narrowly infuscate laterally, and the suture has a broad green band in males and a fuscous one in females.
