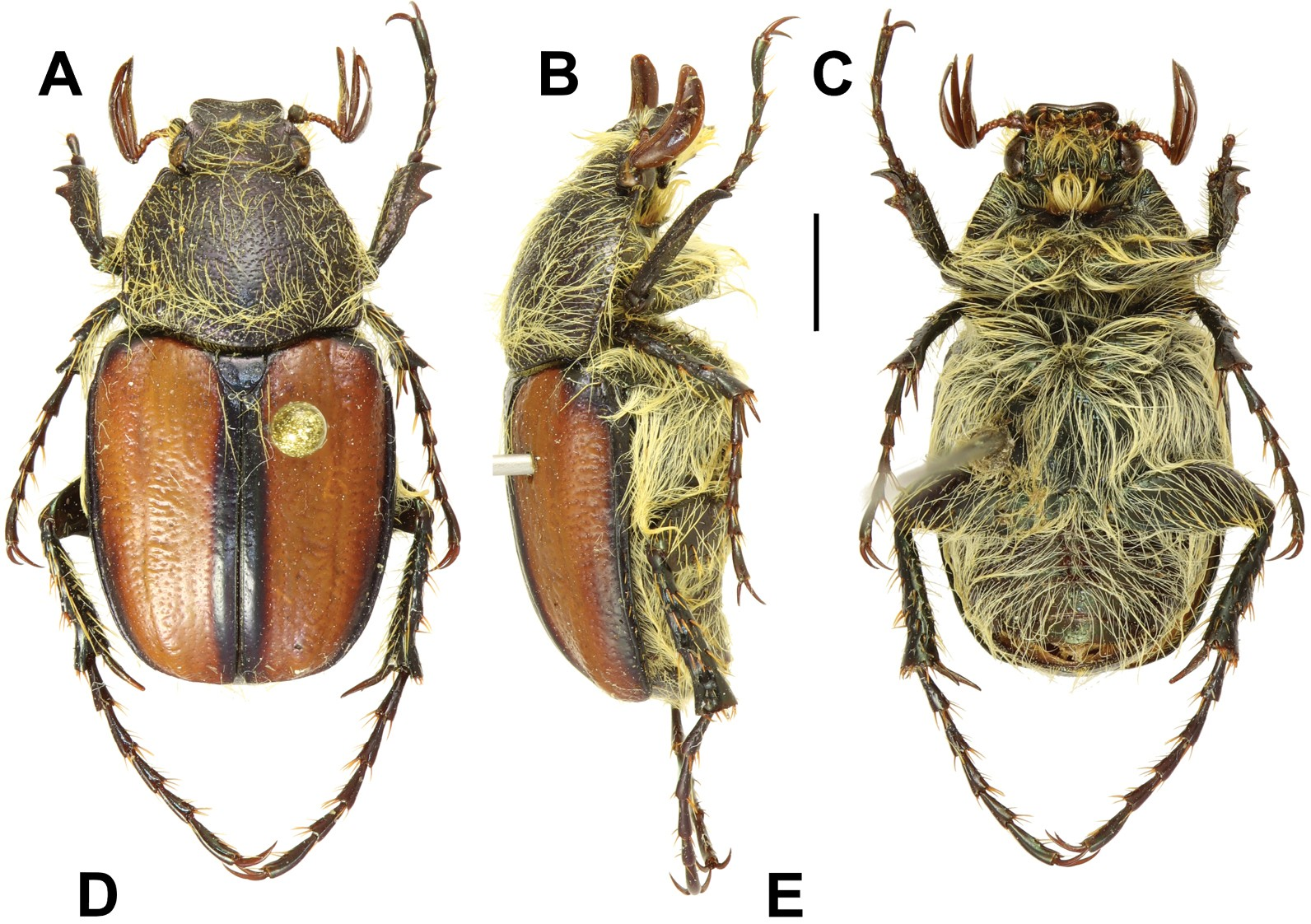

Scientific classification
- Kingdom: Animalia
- Phylum: Arthropoda
- Clade: Pancrustacea
- Class: Insecta
- Order: Coleoptera
- Suborder: Polyphaga
- Infraorder: Scarabaeiformia
- Family: Scarabaeidae
- Genus: Stegopterus
- Species: S. lamellus

Binomial name
- Stegopterus lamellus Ricchiardi, Perissinotto & Strümpher, 2025

= Stegopterus lamellus =

Species of beetle

Stegopterus lamellus is a species of beetle of the family Scarabaeidae. It is found in South Africa (Western Cape). Available records indicate that this species may be restricted to the mountain area between the southeastern end of the Langeberg and the western section of the Outeniekwaberge.

== Description ==
Adults reach a length of about 12.9 mm (0.51 in). They have a stocky body with a melolonthinoid shape. They are black to brownish, with a greenish-purple metallic hue on the head, pronotum and scutellum. The pygidium is black with a greenish-purple metallic hue and the antennae are brownish. The elytra are fulvous with the lateral margins fringed with a thin black band and another larger black band with a greenish-purple metallic hue along the sutural margin and juxtascutellar area, widening on the juxtascutellar-sutural side. The humeral humbones are prominent.

== Etymology ==
The species name is derived from the unique and typical shape of its antennal clubs.
