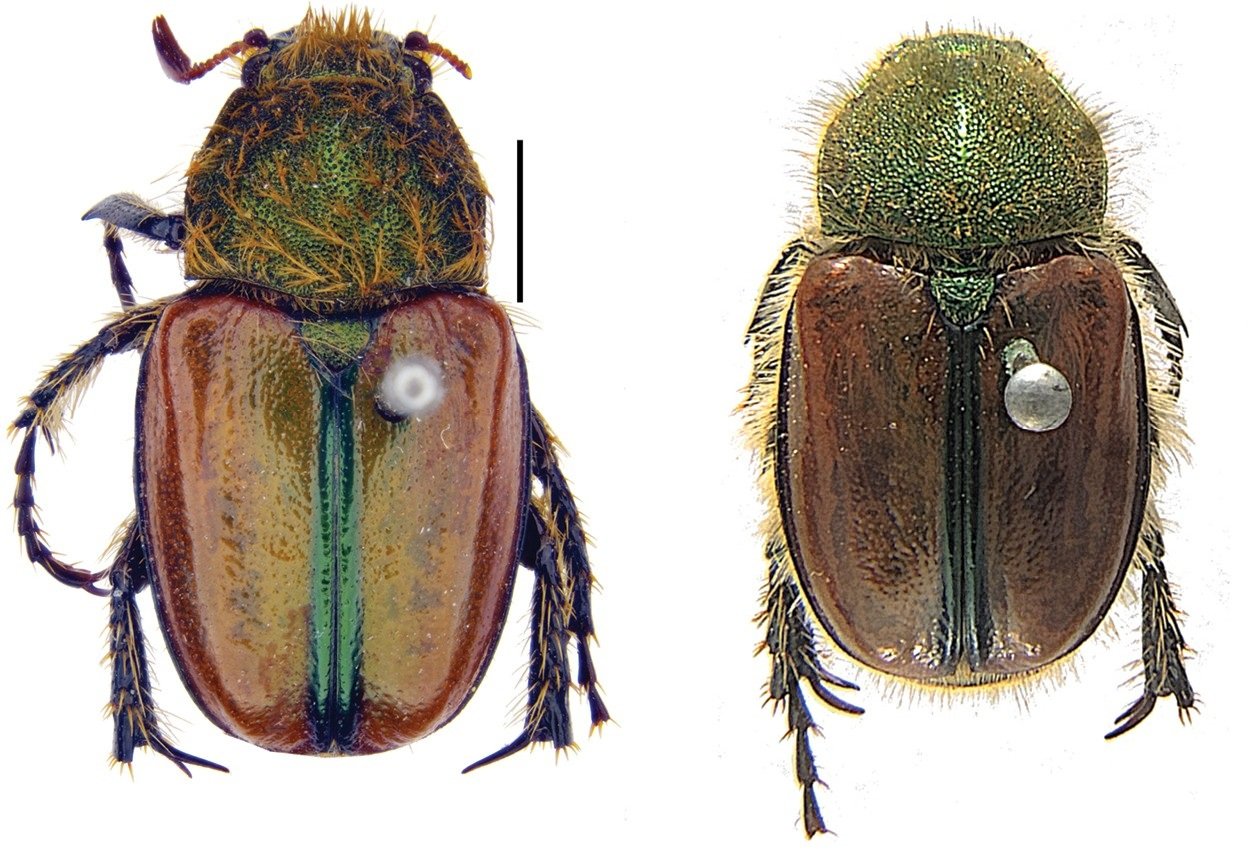

Scientific classification
- Kingdom: Animalia
- Phylum: Arthropoda
- Clade: Pancrustacea
- Class: Insecta
- Order: Coleoptera
- Suborder: Polyphaga
- Infraorder: Scarabaeiformia
- Family: Scarabaeidae
- Genus: Stegopterus
- Species: S. suturalis

Binomial name
- Stegopterus suturalis (Gory & Percheron, 1833)

Synonyms
- Trichius suturalis Gory & Percheron, 1833

= Stegopterus suturalis =

Species of beetle

Stegopterus suturalis is a species of beetle of the family Scarabaeidae. It is found in South Africa (Western Cape). Its range spans from Hermanus in the south-east to Yzerfontein in the north-west and includes the entire lowland region of the Cape Peninsula and parts of the adjacent Overberg and Swartland regions.

== Description ==
Adults reach a length of about 14.5–15 mm (0.57–0.59 in). They are metallic green, with the elytra greenish flavescent or flavescent and very narrowly marginated with black, and the suture with a bright green band. The legs are bluish-black. The antennae (including the club) are rufescent and the head and prothorax of the female are as densely hairy as those of the male, but in the latter the punctures are slightly more asperous. The elytra of the males is more distinctly punctured.
