= Stegopterus =

Scientific classification
- Kingdom: Animalia
- Phylum: Arthropoda
- Clade: Pancrustacea
- Class: Insecta
- Order: Coleoptera
- Suborder: Polyphaga
- Infraorder: Scarabaeiformia
- Family: Scarabaeidae
- Subfamily: Cetoniinae
- Tribe: Trichiini
- Genus: Stegopterus; Burmeister & Schaum, 1840

Synonyms
- Tetrophthalmus Kirby, 1827

Genus of leaf beetles

Stegopterus, the bumblebee beetles, is a genus of beetles belonging to the family Scarabaeidae.

== Species ==
- Stegopterus agulhas Ricchiardi, Perissinotto & Strümpher, 2025
- Stegopterus cochraneae Ricchiardi, Perissinotto & Strümpher, 2025
- Stegopterus endroedyi Ricchiardi, Perissinotto & Strümpher, 2025
- Stegopterus fuscus Ricchiardi, Perissinotto & Strümpher, 2025
- Stegopterus hexrivieri Ricchiardi, Perissinotto & Strümpher, 2025
- Stegopterus kromrivieri Ricchiardi, Perissinotto & Strümpher, 2025
- Stegopterus lamellus Ricchiardi, Perissinotto & Strümpher, 2025
- Stegopterus langebergicus Ricchiardi, Perissinotto & Strümpher, 2025
- Stegopterus paardebergi Ricchiardi, Perissinotto & Strümpher, 2025
- Stegopterus pallidulus Ricchiardi, Perissinotto & Strümpher, 2025
- Stegopterus rotundiceps Ricchiardi, Perissinotto & Strümpher, 2025
- Stegopterus septus Burmeister & Schaum, 1840
- Stegopterus suturalis (Gory & Percheron, 1833)
- Stegopterus vittatus (Fabricius, 1775)

== Species incertae sedis ==
Stegopterus obesus was described by Burmeister in 1842 on the basis of a single female from Port Natal (Durban, KwaZulu-Natal, South Africa). The few key characters specified by Burmeister seem to indicate that a Stegopterus may indeed have been involved. This species was not mentioned by Péringuey in his 1907 revision of the Stegopterus species and is therefore treated as incertae sedis. The locality reported on its label is outside of the known range for the genus, and subsequent searches for this species within have led to the conclusion that it is most unlikely that Stegopterus may have reached that province of South Africa. All the currently known species are restricted to the Fynbos and marginal Karoo areas of the Western Cape Province, not even reaching the Eastern Cape Province.
