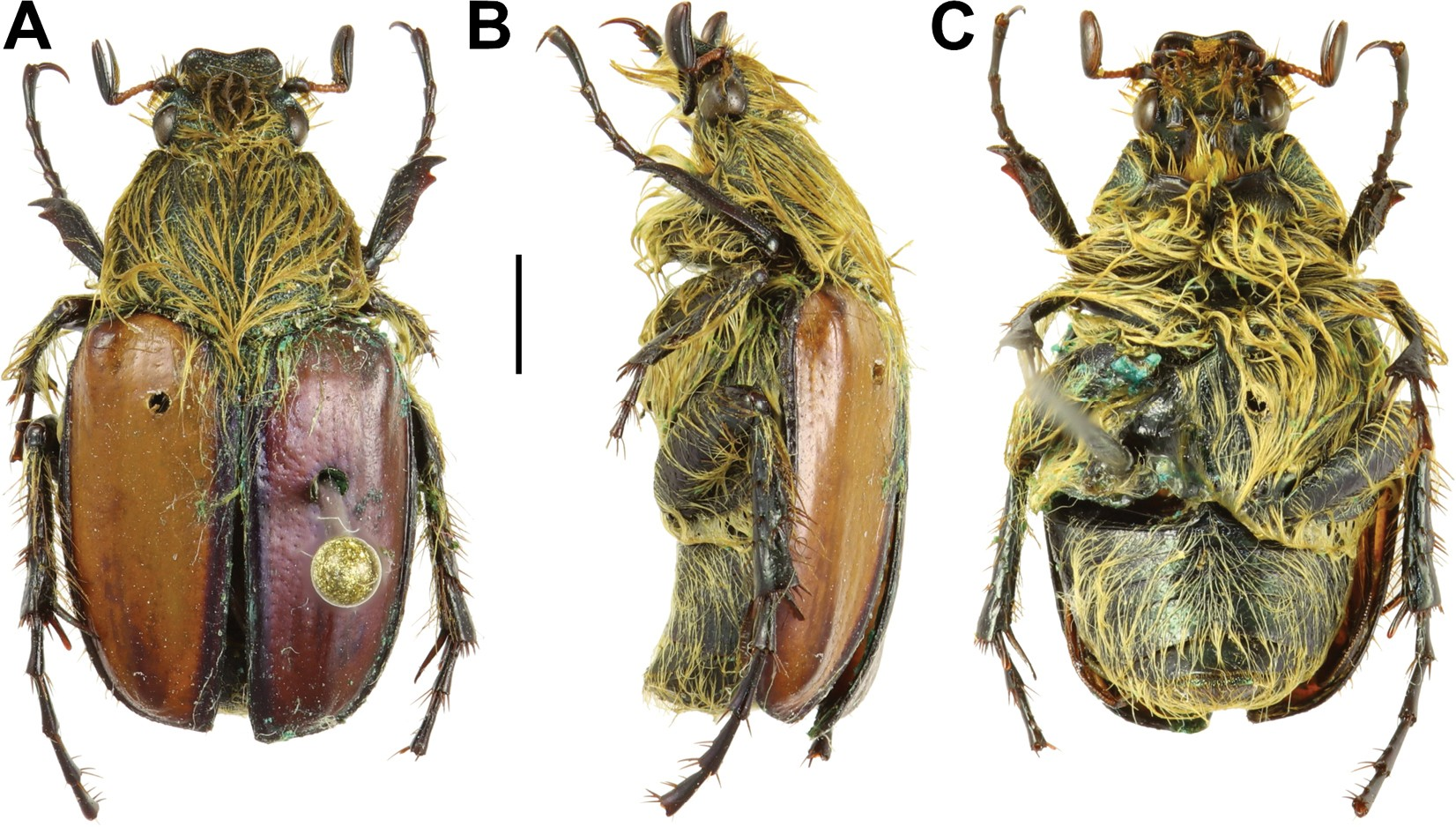

Scientific classification
- Kingdom: Animalia
- Phylum: Arthropoda
- Clade: Pancrustacea
- Class: Insecta
- Order: Coleoptera
- Suborder: Polyphaga
- Infraorder: Scarabaeiformia
- Family: Scarabaeidae
- Genus: Stegopterus
- Species: S. hexrivieri

Binomial name
- Stegopterus hexrivieri Ricchiardi, Perissinotto & Strümpher, 2025

= Stegopterus hexrivieri =

Species of beetle

Stegopterus hexrivieri is a species of beetle of the family Scarabaeidae. It is found in South Africa (Western Cape).

== Description ==
Adults reach a length of about 12.3 mm (0.48 in). They have a stocky body with a melolonthinoid shape. They are black, with a green metallic hue. The elytra are fulvous and the antennae and legs are dark brown. The elytra are bordered at the juxtascutellar and sutural sides by a broad black band reaching the apex. All other margins are narrowly black. The humeral humbones are prominent. The abdomen is black, with a green metallic hue.

== Etymology ==
The species name is derived from the Afrikaans spelling of the Hex River (Hexrivier), where the holotype was collected.
