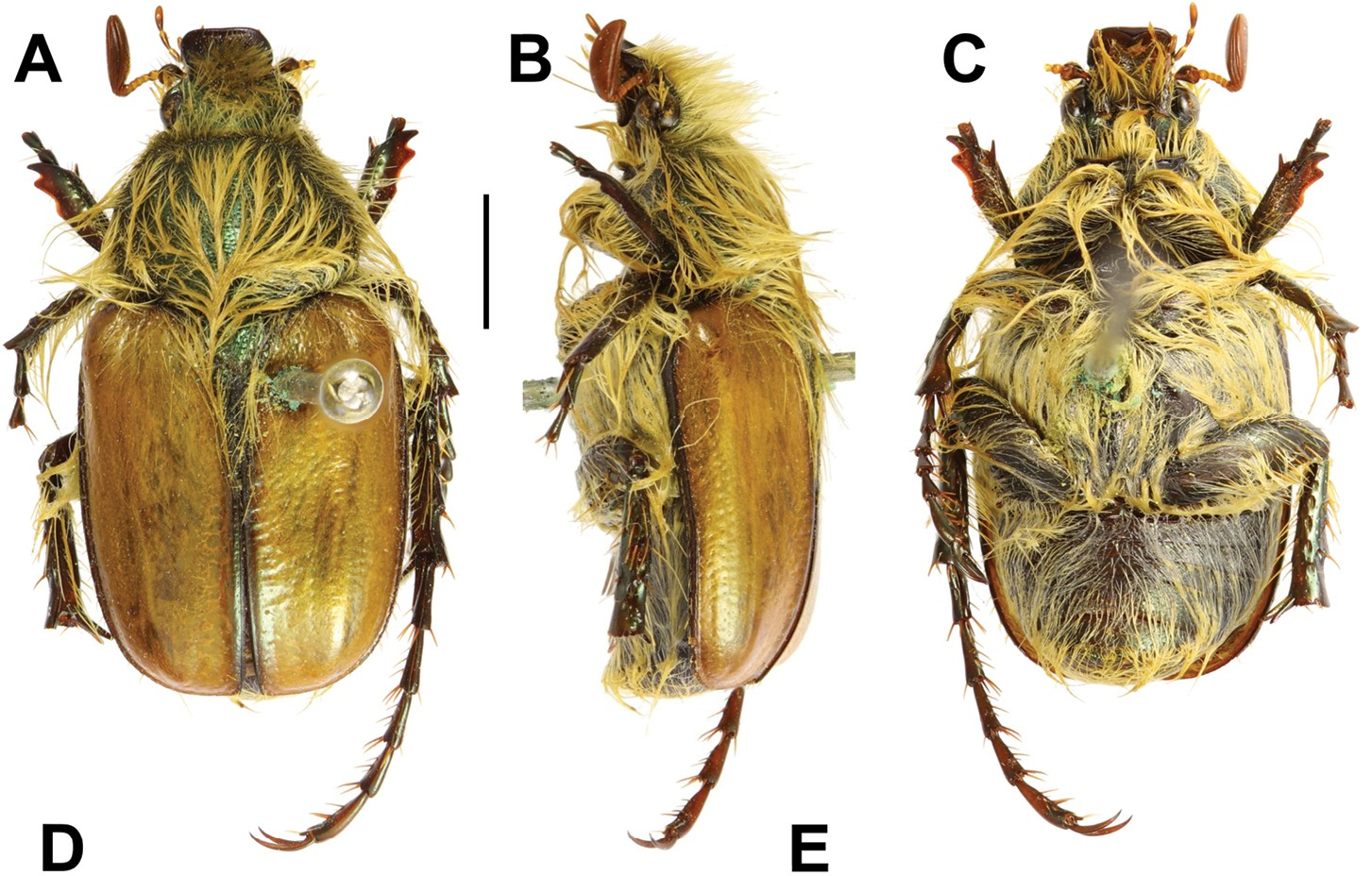

Scientific classification
- Kingdom: Animalia
- Phylum: Arthropoda
- Clade: Pancrustacea
- Class: Insecta
- Order: Coleoptera
- Suborder: Polyphaga
- Infraorder: Scarabaeiformia
- Family: Scarabaeidae
- Genus: Stegopterus
- Species: S. pallidulus

Binomial name
- Stegopterus pallidulus Ricchiardi, Perissinotto & Strümpher, 2025

= Stegopterus pallidulus =

Species of beetle

Stegopterus pallidulus is a species of beetle of the family Scarabaeidae. It is found in South Africa (Western Cape), where it inhabits the Klein Swartberg range, above the town of Ladismith.

== Description ==
Adults reach a length of about 11.8 mm (0.46 in). They have a stocky body with a melolonthinoid shape. They are black, with a greenish metallic hue on the head vertex, pronotum and scutellum. The basal half of the clypeus is dark brown and the apical half bright metallic green. The elytra are light fulvous and the legs are black-brown in places.

== Etymology ==
The species name refers to the pale, light fulvous colouring of its elytra.
