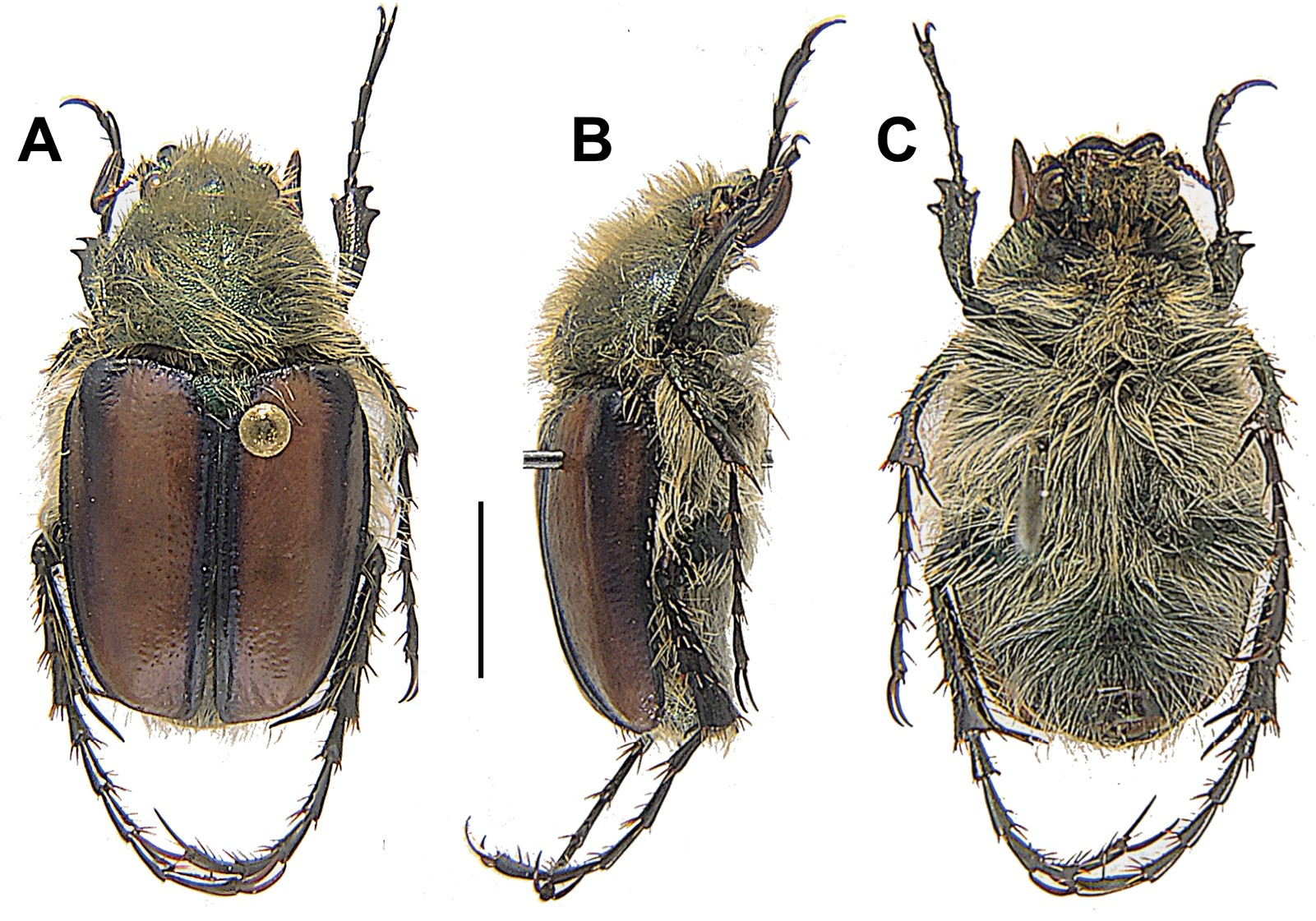

Scientific classification
- Kingdom: Animalia
- Phylum: Arthropoda
- Clade: Pancrustacea
- Class: Insecta
- Order: Coleoptera
- Suborder: Polyphaga
- Infraorder: Scarabaeiformia
- Family: Scarabaeidae
- Genus: Stegopterus
- Species: S. agulhas

Binomial name
- Stegopterus agulhas Ricchiardi, Perissinotto & Strümpher, 2025

= Stegopterus agulhas =

Species of beetle

Stegopterus agulhas is a species of beetle of the family Scarabaeidae. It is found in South Africa (Western Cape).

== Description ==
Adults reach a length of about 15.2 mm (0.60 in). They have a stocky body with a melolonthinoid shape. They are black with a metallic hue. The elytra are dark testaceous, with the anteapical humbones blackish and prominent, and with a large sutural/juxtascutellar black band with a violet hue, not reaching posterior margin. All other elytral margins are narrowly black except the posterior. The antennae are brownish and the legs are black with a coppery metallic hue.

== Life history ==
Specimens were found feeding on flowers of Berzelia, Leucadendron and Leoucospermum species.

== Etymology ==
The species is named after the locality where the type series was collected.
