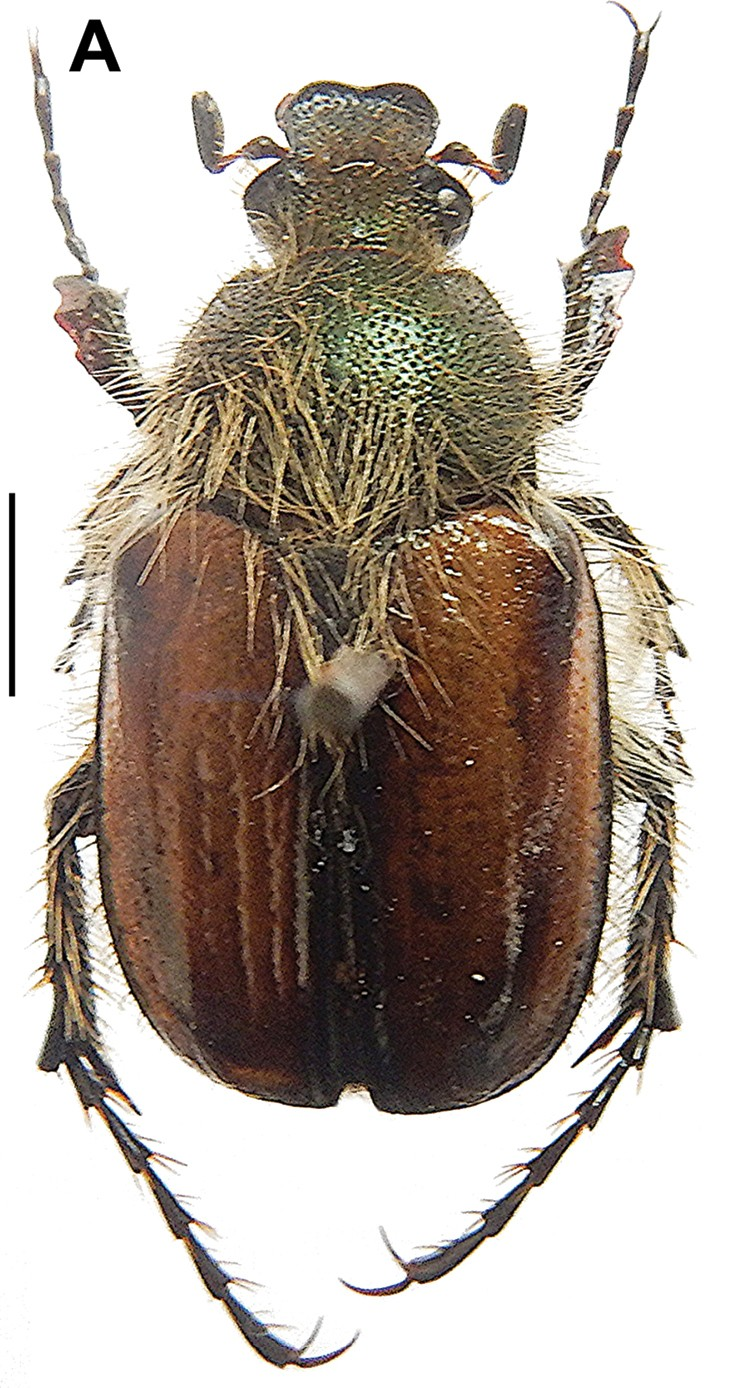

Scientific classification
- Kingdom: Animalia
- Phylum: Arthropoda
- Clade: Pancrustacea
- Class: Insecta
- Order: Coleoptera
- Suborder: Polyphaga
- Infraorder: Scarabaeiformia
- Family: Scarabaeidae
- Genus: Stegopterus
- Species: S. kromrivieri

Binomial name
- Stegopterus kromrivieri Ricchiardi, Perissinotto & Strümpher, 2025

= Stegopterus kromrivieri =

Species of beetle

Stegopterus kromrivieri is a species of beetle of the family Scarabaeidae. It is found in South Africa (Western Cape), where it is known from the Cederberg, occurring across the entire mountain range and reaching as far south as the Koue Bokkeveld region.

== Description ==
Adults reach a length of about 10.4–12.4 mm (0.41–0.49 in). They have a stocky body with a melolonthinoid shape. They are black, with a predominant green metallic hue on the head vertex, pronotum, pygidium, abdomen and legs. The humeral humbones are prominent.

== Etymology ==
The species name is derived from the Afrikaans spelling of the Krom River (Kromrivier), where the holotype was collected.
