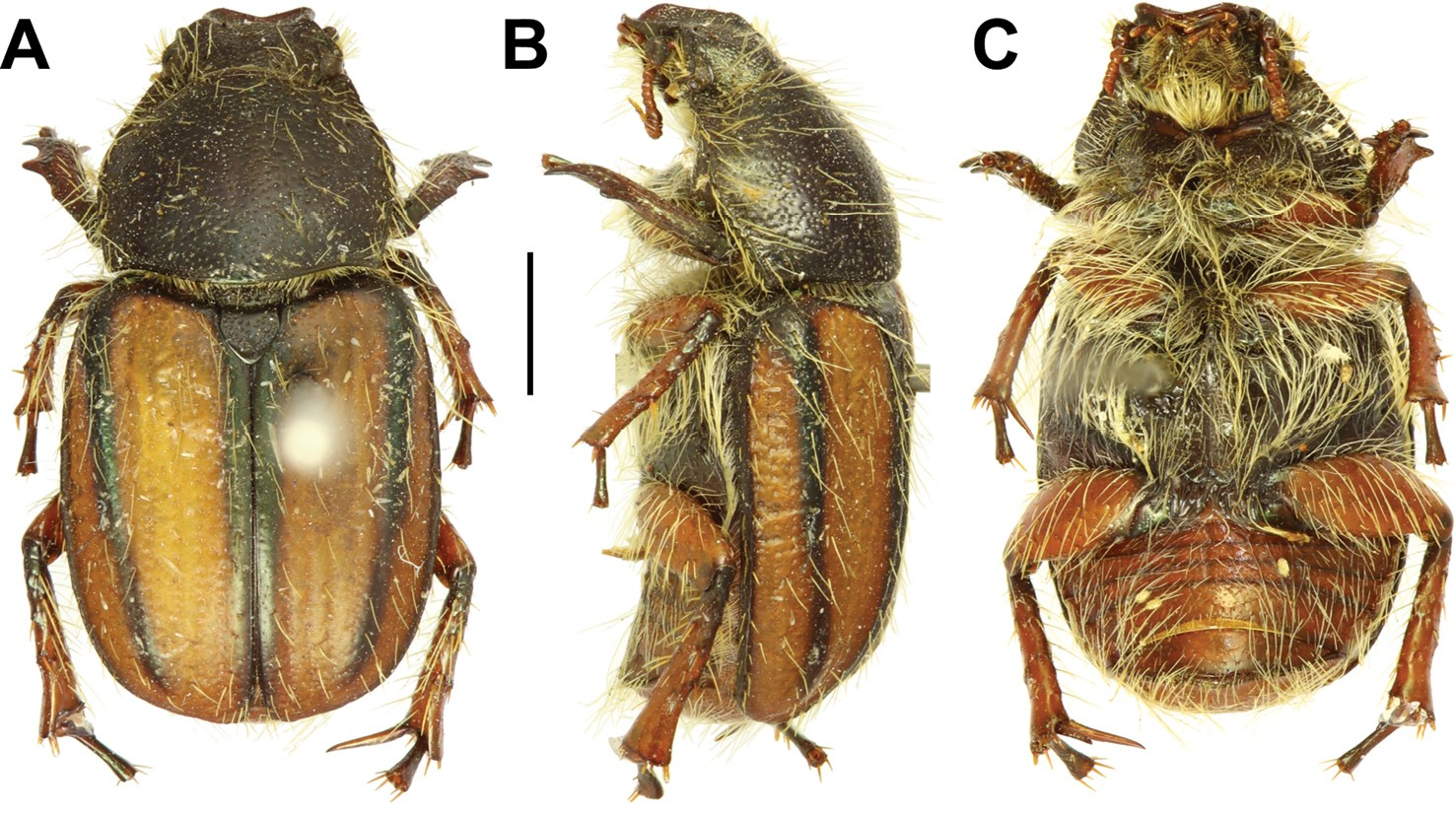

Scientific classification
- Kingdom: Animalia
- Phylum: Arthropoda
- Clade: Pancrustacea
- Class: Insecta
- Order: Coleoptera
- Suborder: Polyphaga
- Infraorder: Scarabaeiformia
- Family: Scarabaeidae
- Genus: Stegopterus
- Species: S. fuscus

Binomial name
- Stegopterus fuscus Ricchiardi, Perissinotto & Strümpher, 2025

= Stegopterus fuscus =

Species of beetle

Stegopterus fuscus is a species of beetle of the family Scarabaeidae. It is found in South Africa (Western Cape).

== Description ==
Adults reach a length of about 10.3 mm (0.41 in). They have a stocky body with a melolonthinoid shape. They are fuscous coloured, with the head and scutellum black and the pronotum black with a green metallic hue. The head is black, but the anterior margin of the clypeus is brownish. Both the pronotum and scutellum have a predominant metallic green hue and black margins. The legs are brownish, and darkened in places.

== Etymology ==
This species name refers to the dark brown (fuscous) colour of most of its body surface.
