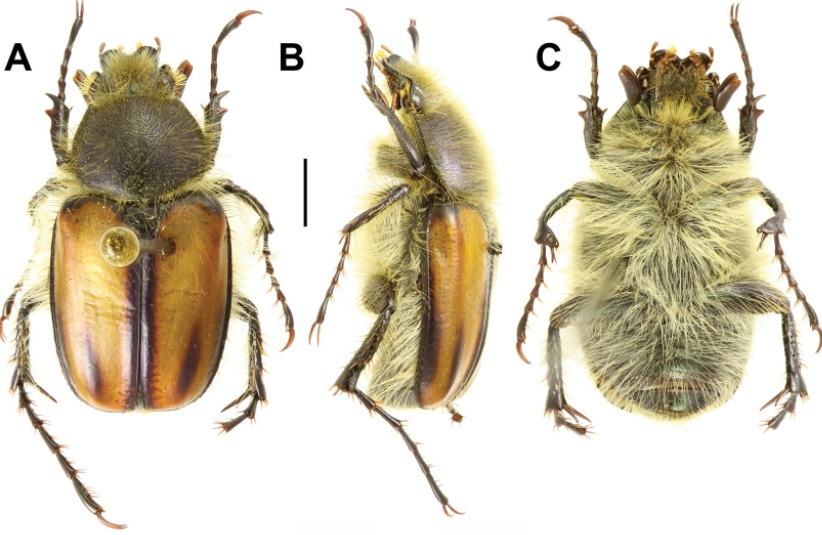

Scientific classification
- Kingdom: Animalia
- Phylum: Arthropoda
- Clade: Pancrustacea
- Class: Insecta
- Order: Coleoptera
- Suborder: Polyphaga
- Infraorder: Scarabaeiformia
- Family: Scarabaeidae
- Genus: Stegopterus
- Species: S. endroedyi

Binomial name
- Stegopterus endroedyi Ricchiardi, Perissinotto & Strümpher, 2025

= Stegopterus endroedyi =

Species of beetle

Stegopterus endroedyi is a species of beetle of the family Scarabaeidae. It is found in South Africa (Western Cape).

== Description ==
Adults reach a length of about 11.9 mm (0.47 in). They have a stocky body with a melolonthinoid shape. They are black, with a metallic hue. The head, pronotum and scutellum have a predominant metallic green hue but black margins. The anterior half of the clypeus is glabrous, while the posterior half has scattered, long, testaceous setae.

== Etymology ==
This species is dedicated to the Hungarian entomologist Sebastian Endrödy-Younga, who collected the type series.
