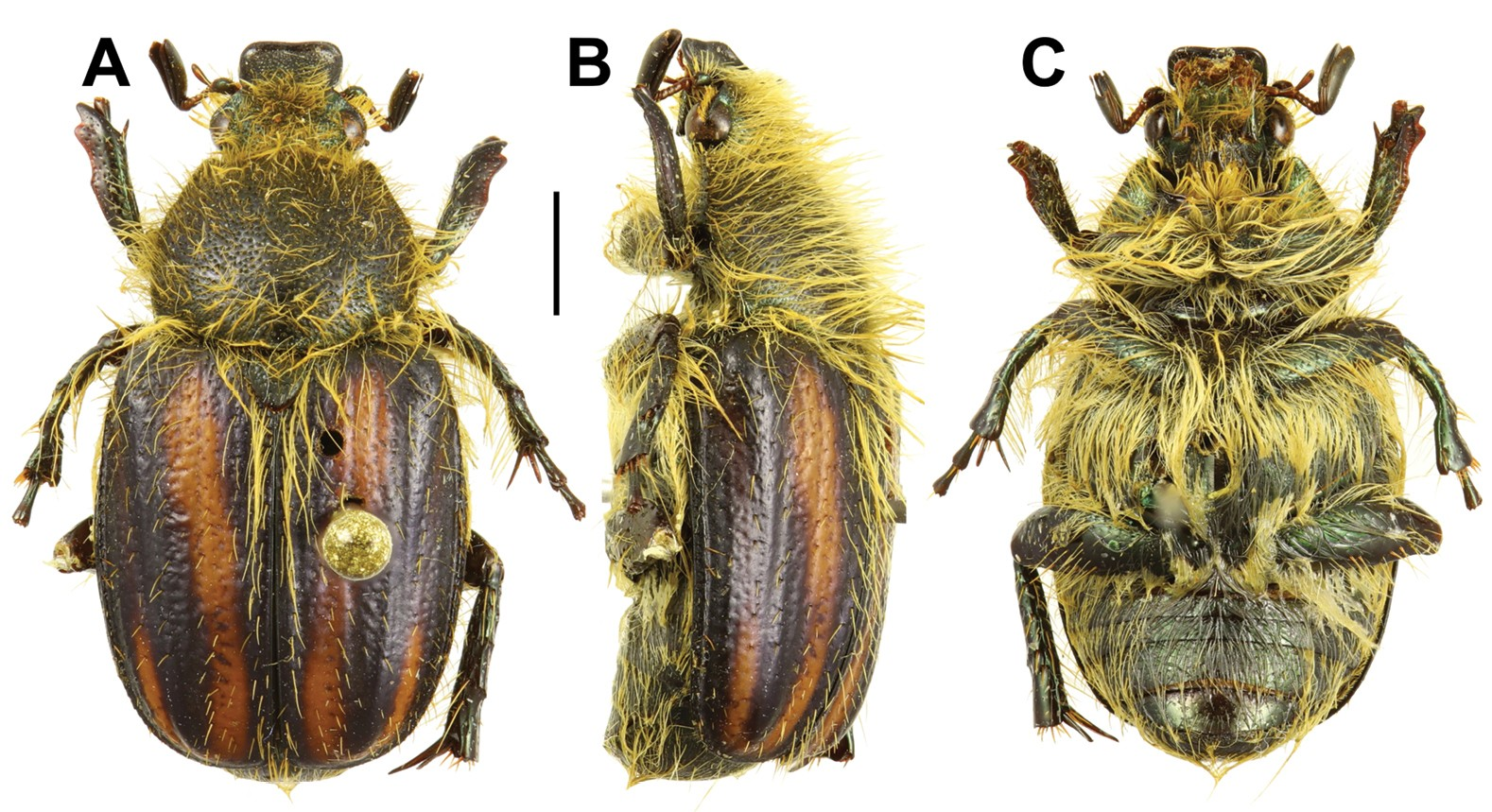

Scientific classification
- Kingdom: Animalia
- Phylum: Arthropoda
- Clade: Pancrustacea
- Class: Insecta
- Order: Coleoptera
- Suborder: Polyphaga
- Infraorder: Scarabaeiformia
- Family: Scarabaeidae
- Genus: Stegopterus
- Species: S. cochraneae

Binomial name
- Stegopterus cochraneae Ricchiardi, Perissinotto & Strümpher, 2025

= Stegopterus cochraneae =

Species of beetle

Stegopterus cochraneae is a species of beetle of the family Scarabaeidae. It is found in South Africa (Western Cape), where it has been recorded at high-altitudes across the entire mountainous area between the towns of Paarl, Franschhoek and Worcester. This area comprises the Hawekwaberge and the Dutoitsberge range.

== Description ==
Adults reach a length of about 13.6 mm (0.54 in). They have a stocky body with a melolonthinoid shape. They are black, with a green metallic hue, partially orange-brown antennae and with orange-brown elytra and legs. The elytra are bordered by a broad black band fading towards the apical margin. A second black band joining the external basal corner to the anteapical humbone is also present.

== Etymology ==
This species is dedicated to Margie Cochrane, a former curator at SAMC.
