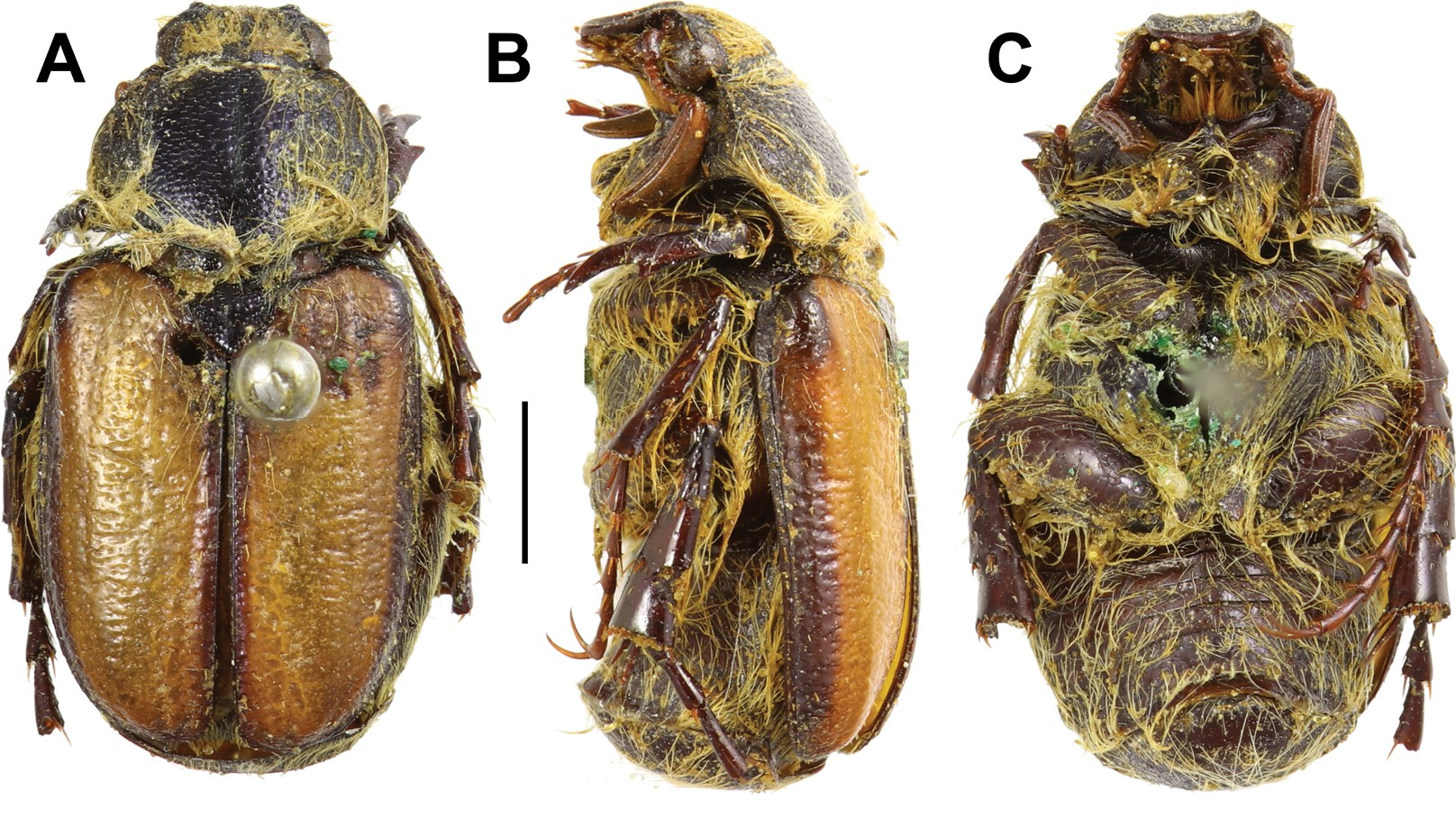

Scientific classification
- Kingdom: Animalia
- Phylum: Arthropoda
- Clade: Pancrustacea
- Class: Insecta
- Order: Coleoptera
- Suborder: Polyphaga
- Infraorder: Scarabaeiformia
- Family: Scarabaeidae
- Genus: Stegopterus
- Species: S. rotundiceps

Binomial name
- Stegopterus rotundiceps Ricchiardi, Perissinotto & Strümpher, 2025

= Stegopterus rotundiceps =

Species of beetle

Stegopterus rotundiceps is a species of beetle of the family Scarabaeidae. It is found in South Africa (Western Cape), where it is thought to occur in the region of the western lower slopes of the broader Cederberg range between the towns of Leipoldtville and Clanwilliam.

== Description ==
Adults reach a length of about 10.8 mm (0.43 in). They have a stocky body with a melolonthinoid shape. They are black to brownish with the elytra fulvous, with a blackish or brownish band at the margins.

== Etymology ==
The species name refers to the rounded shape of the clypeal lateral margins.
