= Nest =

Place of refuge for animals

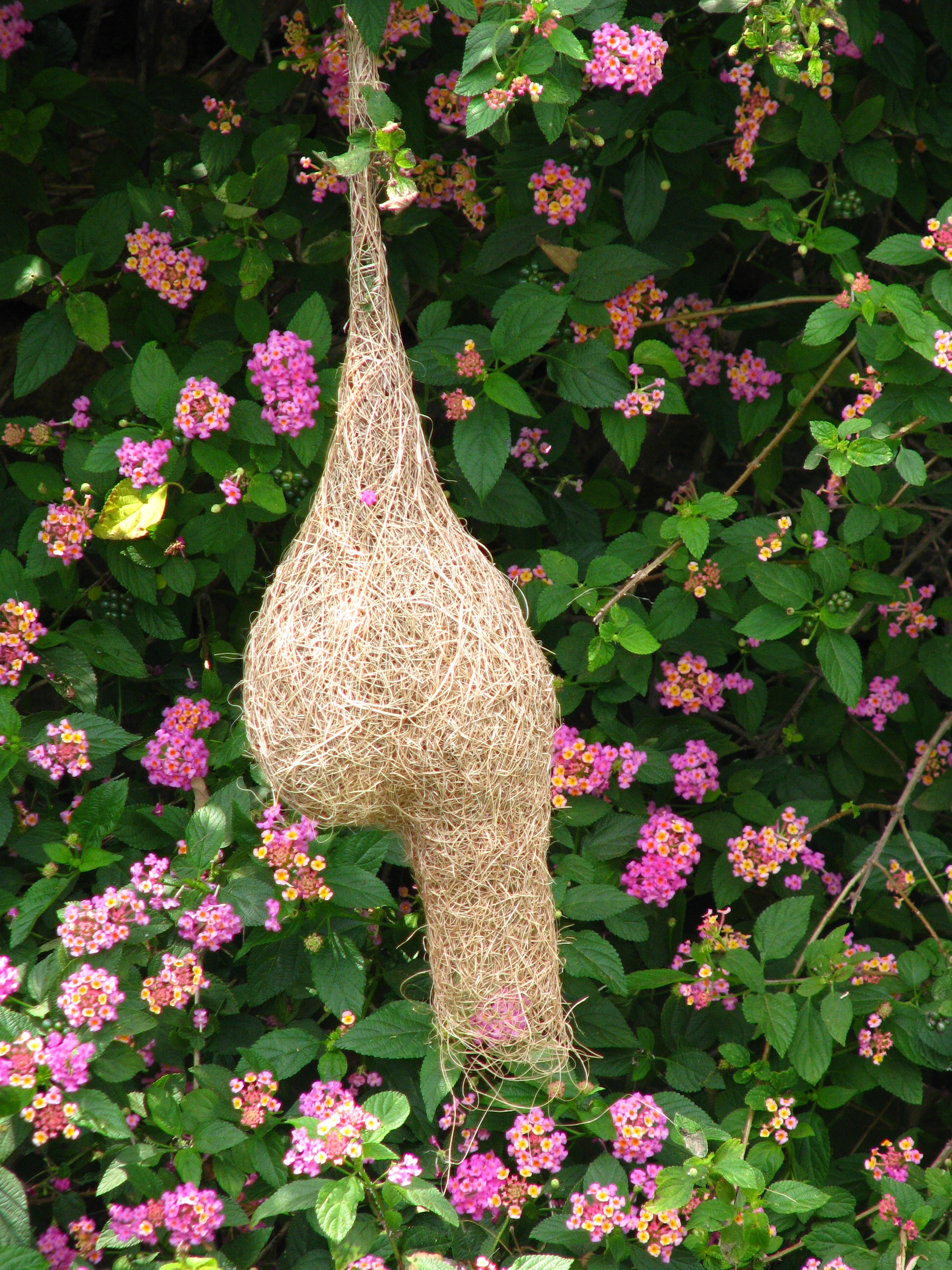
The elaborate bird nest of a baya weaver

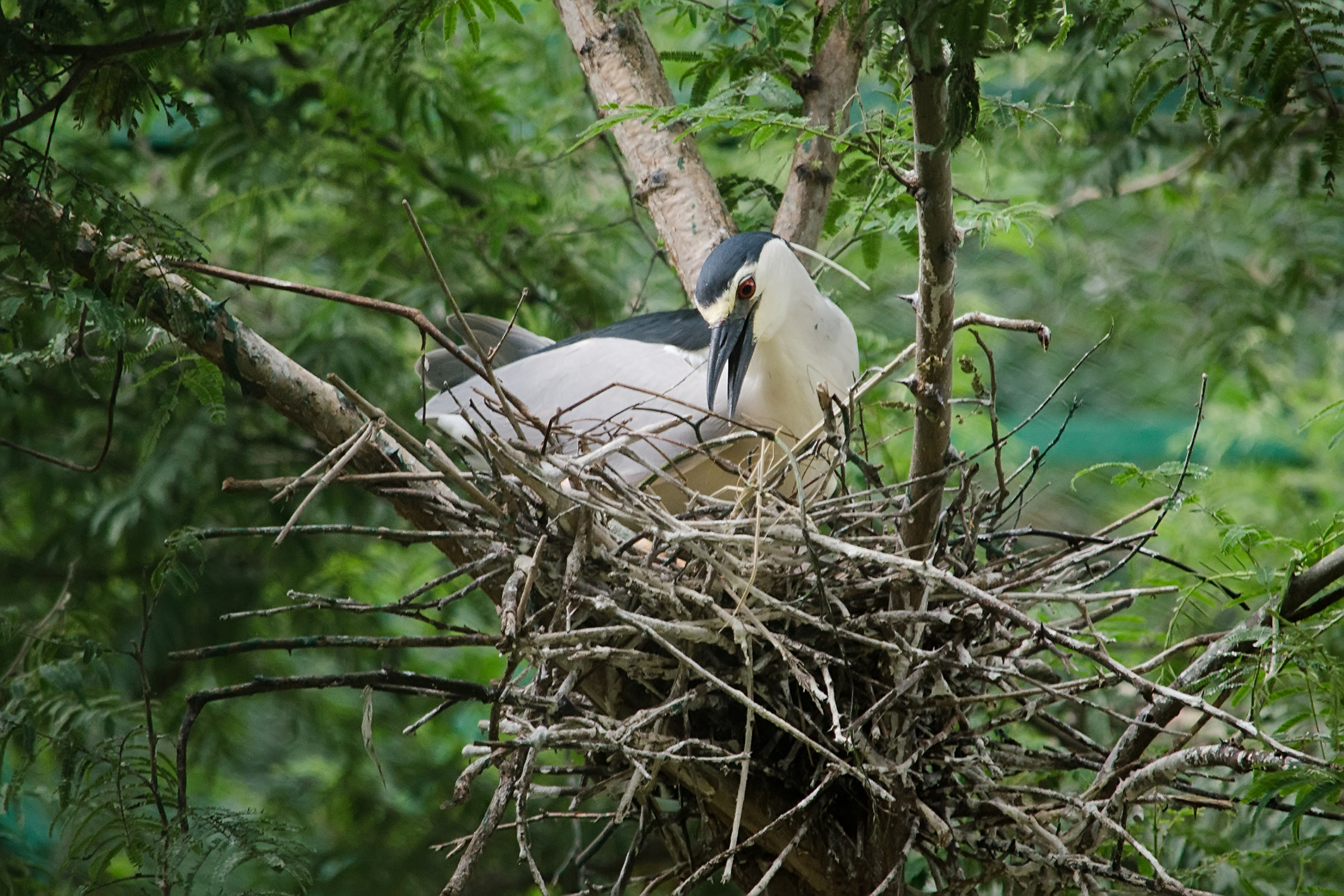
A night heron building a nest

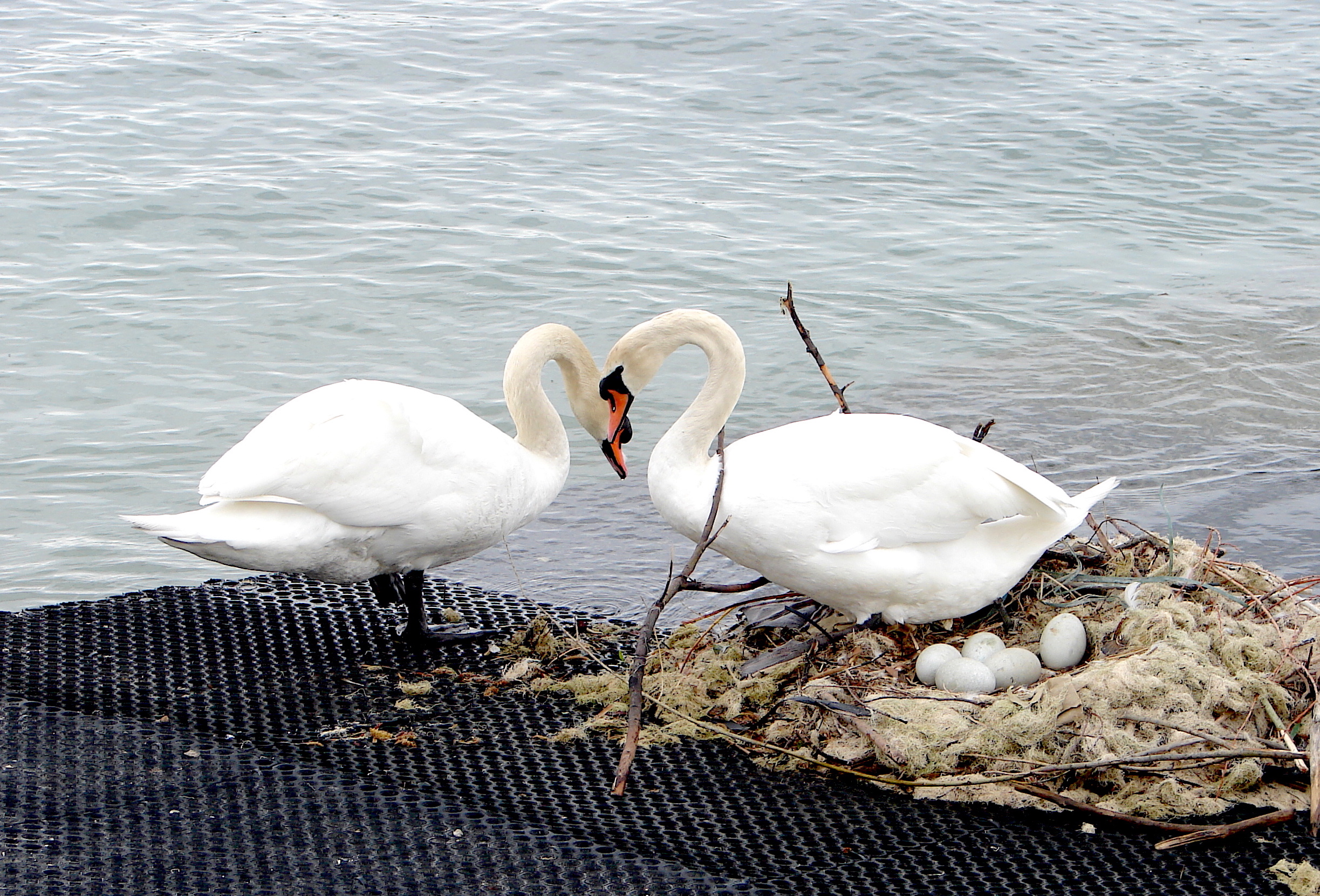
Swans with nest and eggs at Lake Constance

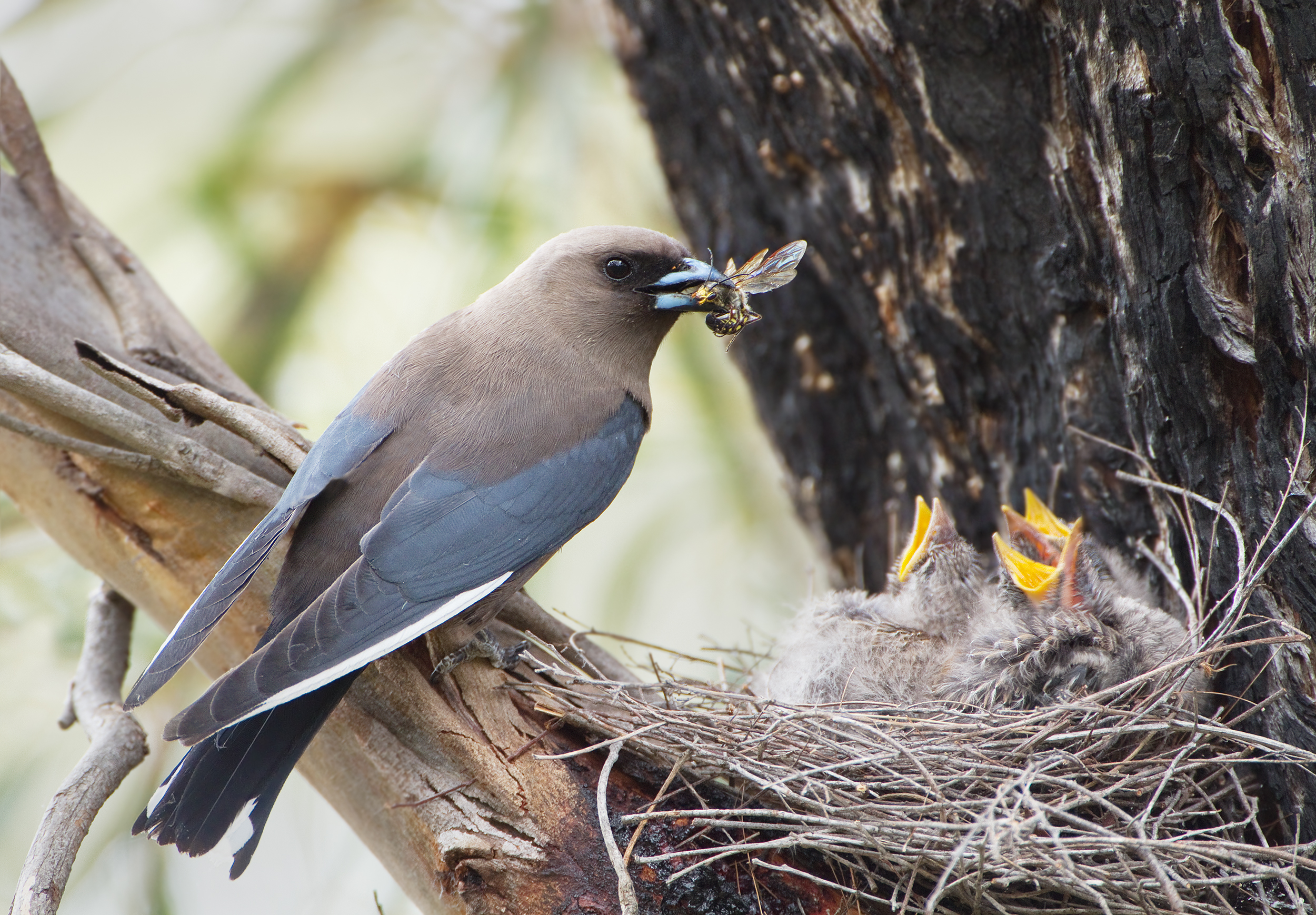
A dusky woodswallow parent feeding chicks in a nest at Mortimer Bay, Tasmania, Australia.

A nest is a structure built by certain animals to hold their eggs or young. Although nests are most closely associated with birds, members of all classes of vertebrates and some invertebrates construct nests. They may be composed of organic material such as twigs, grass, and leaves, or may be a simple depression in the ground, or a hole in a rock, tree, or building. Human-made materials, such as string, plastic, cloth, or paper, may also be used. Nests can be found in all types of habitat.

Nest building is driven by a biological urge known as the nesting instinct in birds and mammals. Generally each species has a distinctive style of nest. Nest complexity is roughly correlated with the level of parental care by adults. Nest building is considered a key adaptive advantage among birds, and they exhibit the most variation in their nests ranging from simple holes in the ground to elaborate communal nests hosting hundreds of individuals. Nests of prairie dogs and several social insects can host millions of individuals.

== Nest building ==
=== Purposes of nesting ===
==== Structural purposes ====
Nest building (nidification) is often driven by a biological urge in pregnant animals to protect one's offspring known as the nesting instinct. Animals build nests to protect their eggs, their offspring, or themselves from danger. The simplest nest structures are adapted to hide eggs from predators, shield them from the sun or other environmental factors, or simply keep them from being scattered in ocean currents. In some cases, nests also help provide safety in numbers for egg-laying animals.

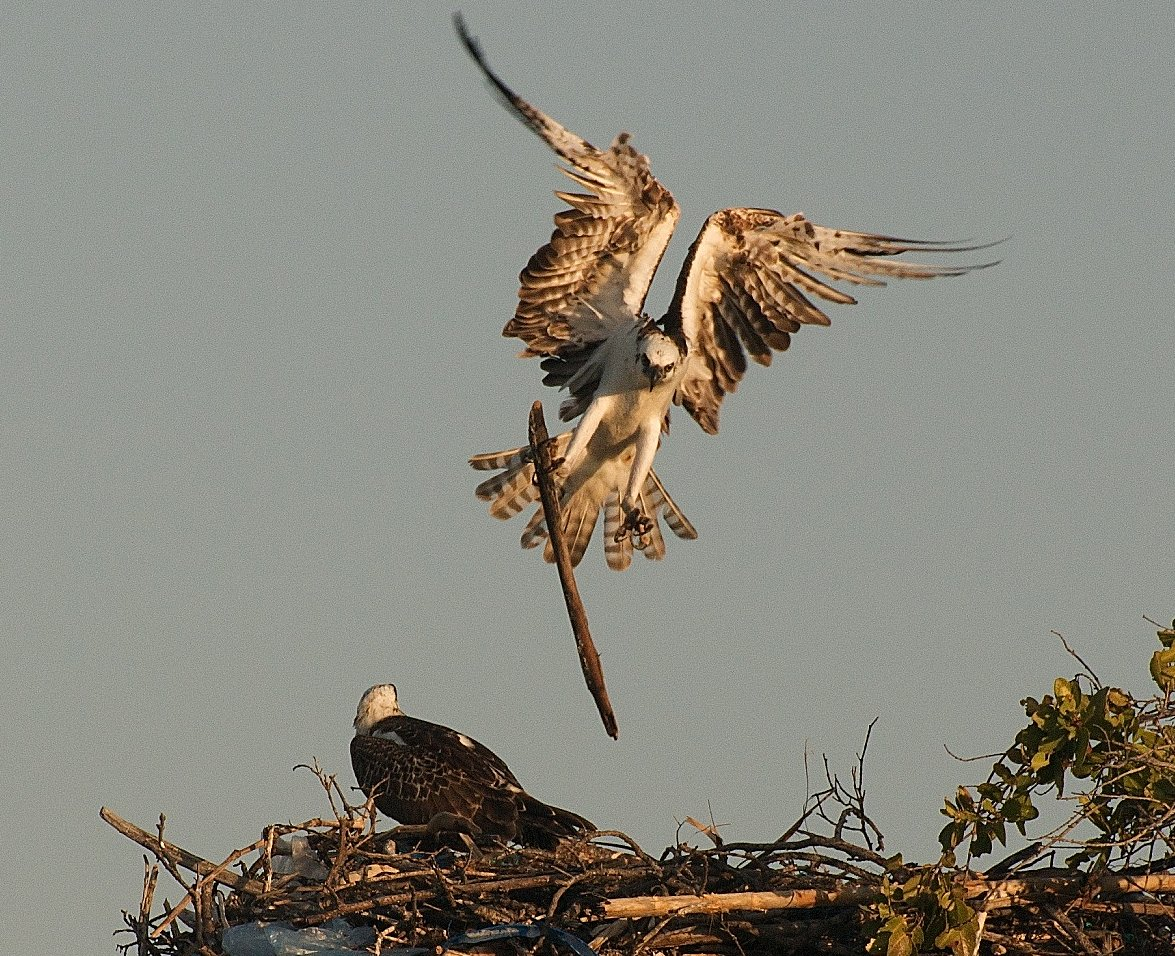
A pair of ospreys building a nest.

==== Social purposes ====
Many nest builders provide parental care to their young, while others simply lay their eggs and leave. Brooding (incubating eggs by sitting on them) is common among birds. In general, nest complexity increases in relation to the level of parental care provided. Nest building reinforces social behavior, allowing for larger populations in small spaces to the point of increasing the carrying capacity of an environment. Insects that exhibit the most complex nidification also exhibit the greatest social structure. Among mammals, the naked mole-rat displays a caste structure similar to the social insects while building extensive burrows that house hundreds of individuals.

=== Usage of environment ===
Versatility in use of construction material may be an adaptive advantage (less energy used to gather materials) or a disadvantage (less ability to specialize construction). The available evidence suggests that natural selection more often favors specialization over flexibility in nest construction.

At the most basic level, there are only two types of nest building: sculpting and assembly.

==== Sculpting ====
Sculpting is the process of removing material to achieve the desired outcome. Most commonly this entails burrowing into the ground or plant matter to create a nesting site.

==== Assembly ====
Assembly entails gathering, transporting, and arranging materials to create a novel structure. Transportation has the greatest time and energy cost so animals are usually adapted to build with materials available in their immediate environment.

=== Building materials ===
Plant matter is the most common construction material for nests. Other common materials include fur or feathers, perhaps from the animal itself, mud or dirt, fecal matter, and specialized secretions from the animal's body.

=== Effects on environment ===
Nest building can have a substantial impact on the environment in which animals live. The combined digging activity of termites and mole-rats in South Africa has created a "mima prairie" landscape marked by huge areas of flat land punctuated by mounds 30 metres (98 ft) wide and 2 metres (6.6 ft) high. Similar structures exist in the United States, created by pocket gophers, and Argentina, rodents of the genus Ctenomys.

==== Lasting effects ====
Nests constructed by megapode birds have been mistaken for anthropological features by professionals, due to their exceptional height (10 metres [33 ft]) and abundance (hundreds in a single location).

Some nests, such as those built by bearded vultures, can last for several centuries, after being used by multiple generations of birds. In one of such nests, several human objects from the 13th to the 19th centuries were found, all of them in the same nest.

== Nest builders ==
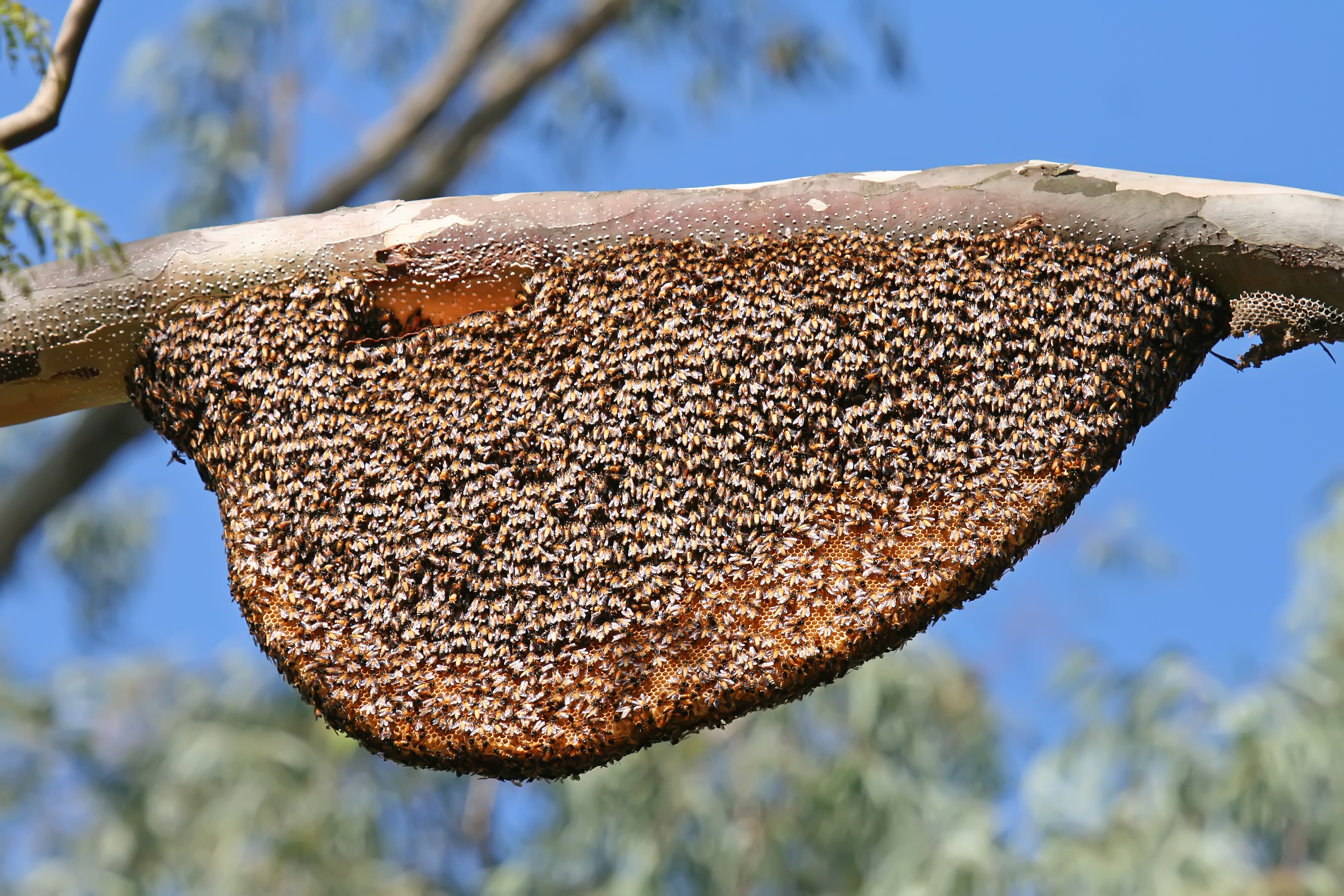
Hundreds of honeybees gather on their honeycomb nest

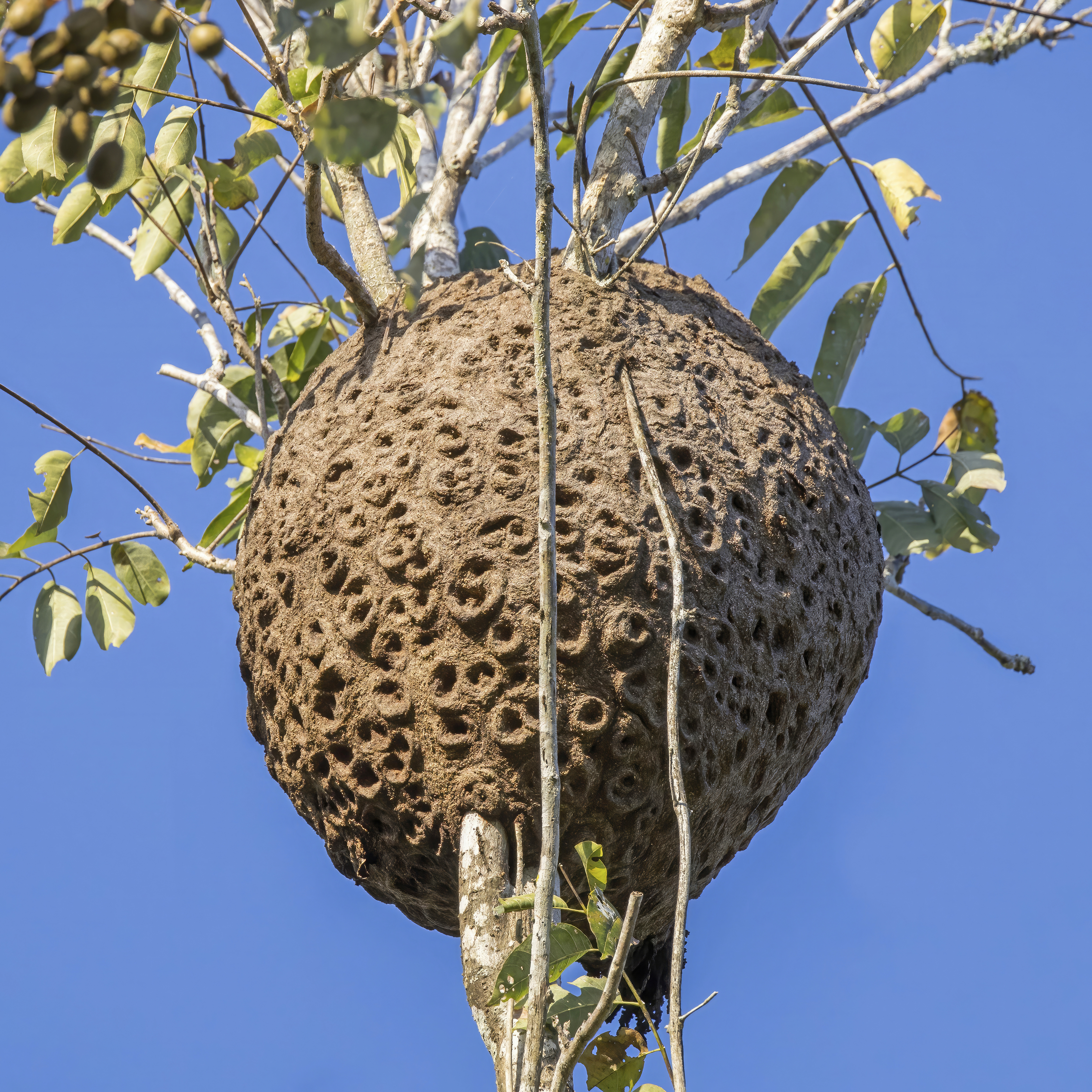
Arboreal stingless bee nest in Guatemala

Nest architecture may be as useful for distinguishing species as the animals' physical appearance. Species identified through such means are called ethospecies. This is especially common in wasps and termites, but also can apply to birds. In most animals, there is some variation in nest construction between individuals. Whether these differences are driven by genetics or learned behavior is unknown.

With the exception of a few tunneling mammals, nest builders exhibit no specialized anatomy, instead making use of body parts primarily used for other purposes. This is possibly due to the sporadic nature of nest building, minimizing the selective pressures of anatomy used for nest building.

=== Birds ===
In general, birds are the most skilled nest builders, although not all species of birds build nests, some laying their eggs directly onto rock ledges or bare soil without first modifying the area. Complex nest building is considered to be one of the key adaptive advantages of birds. Nests help regulate temperature and reduce predation risks, thus increasing the chance that offspring live to adulthood.

Bird nests vary from simple depressions in the ground known as scrapes to largely unstructured collections of branches to elaborately woven pendants or spheres. The megapodes, one of the few groups who do not directly brood their young, incubate their young in a mound of decomposing vegetation. One species, Macrocephalon maleo, uses volcanic sand warmed by geothermal heat to keep its eggs warm. Among the simple nest builders are falcons, owls, and many shorebirds. The weavers exhibit perhaps the most elaborate nests, complete with strands of grass tied into knots. Most bird nests lie somewhere in the middle, with the majority building cup-shaped nests using some combination of mud, twigs and leaves, and feathers. Some birds, such flamingos and swifts, use saliva to help hold their nest together. The edible-nest swiftlet uses saliva alone to construct their nests. The rufous hornero nest is composed entirely of mud and feces, which is placed on tree branches to allow the sun to harden it into a usable structure. The tailorbirds stitch together leaves to provide cover for their nest sites.

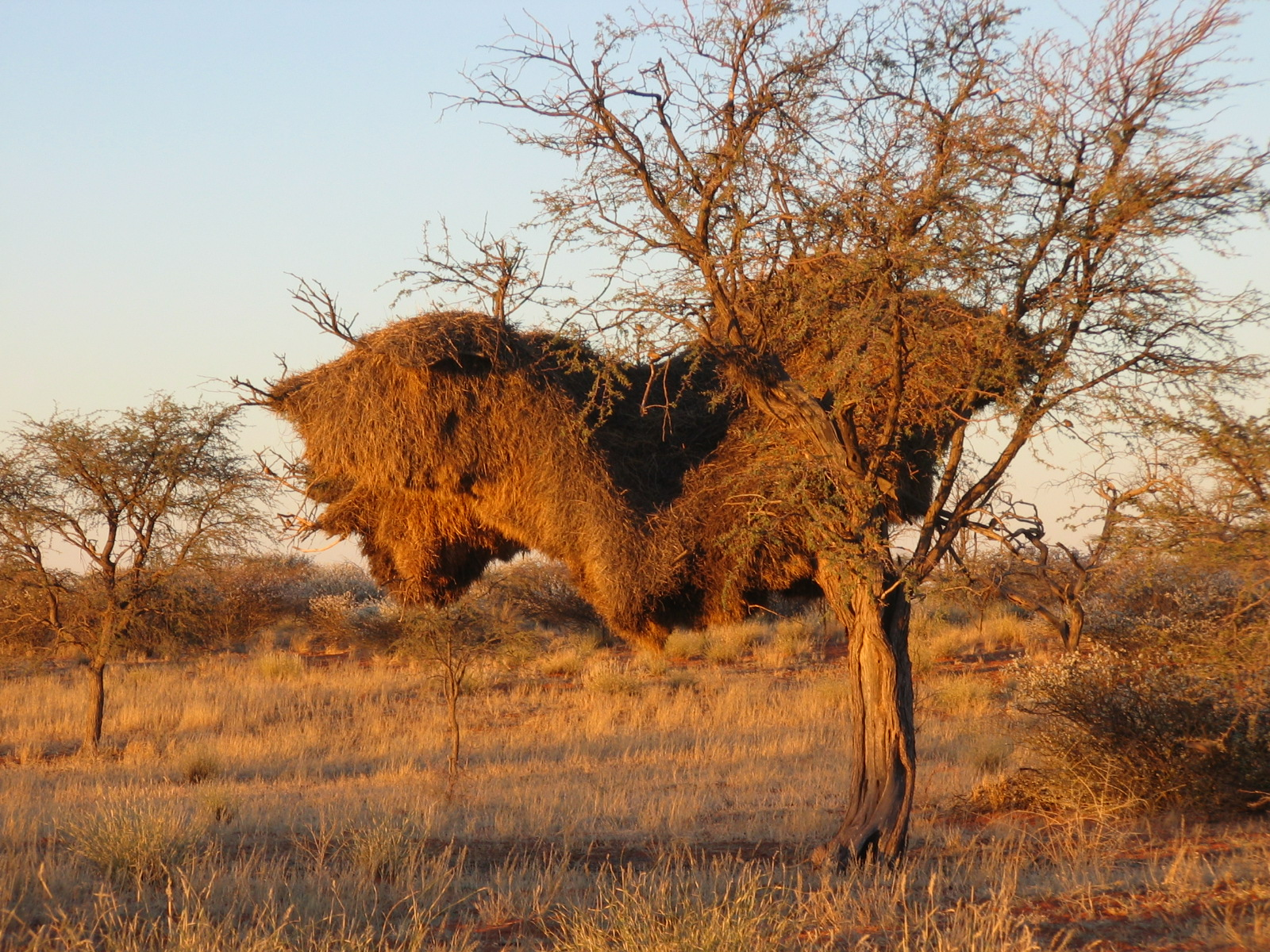
A single nesting colony of the sociable weaver may house hundreds of individuals

The sociable weaver builds large communal nests in which many individual nests reside. They divide the nest using walls of grass placed atop a base of large sticks. At the entrances to the nest, sharp sticks are placed to ward off intruders. A single communal site can measure 2 metres (6.6 ft) in height and 8 metres (26 ft) in width. As many as 300 mating pairs may reside in the structure. Other birds often built their own nests on top of Weaver nest sites.

Some birds build nests in trees, some (such as eagles, vultures, and many seabirds) will build them on rocky ledges, and others nest on the ground or in burrows. Each species has a characteristic nest style, but few are particular about where they build their nests. Most species will choose whatever site in their environment best protects their nest, taking into account the nest's style. Several species will build on a cactus whenever possible. The bushtit and Bullock's oriole will suspend their nests from the tips of slender branches. The oropendolas take hanging nests to the extreme, constructing pouches up to 1.8 metres (5.9 ft) tall using hanging vines as their base. The hanging nest is attached to thin tree branches, discouraging predation. Other species seek out crevices, using buildings or birdhouses when tree holes are not available.

Typical bird nests range from 2 centimetres (0.79 in) in size (hummingbirds) to 2 metres (6.6 ft) (eagles) in diameter. The largest nest on record was made by a pair of bald eagles. It was 2.9 metres (9.5 ft) in diameter, 6 metres (20 ft) deep and was estimated to weigh more than 2 tonnes (4,400 lb). The lightest bird nests may weigh only a few grams. Incubation mounds of the mallee fowl can reach heights of 4.57 metres (15.0 ft) and widths of 10.6 metres (35 ft). It is estimated the animal uses as much as 300 tonnes (660,000 lb) of material in its construction. The extinct Sylviornis neocaledoniae may have constructed nesting mounds 50 metres (160 ft) in diameter.

=== Mammals ===
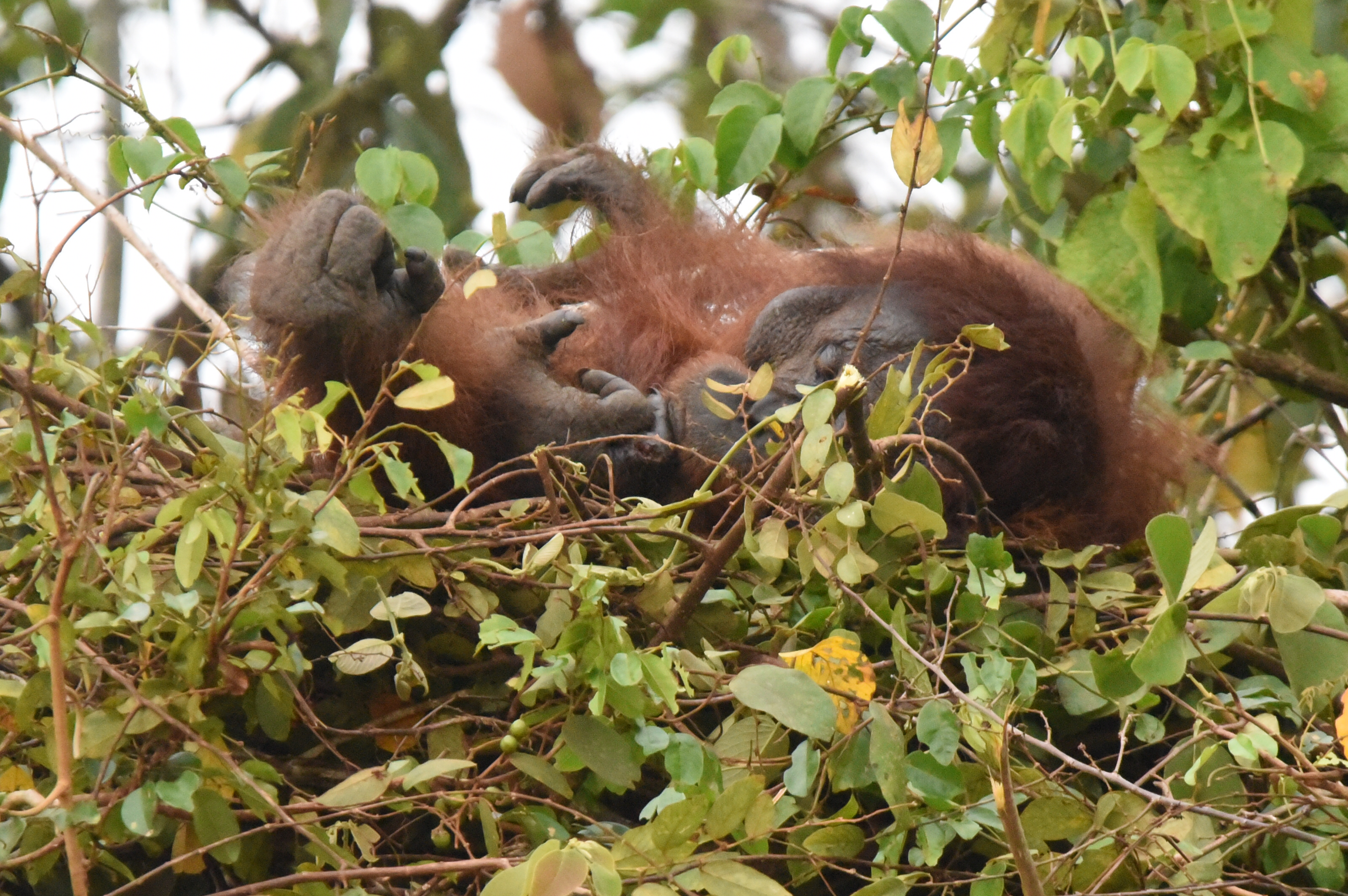
Bornean orangutan (Pongo pygmaeus) in its nest

Many species of small mammals such as rodents, rabbits, and ground squirrels dig burrows into the ground to protect themselves and their young. Prairie dogs build an elaborate system of tunnels which can span large stretches of land. One such structure, called a town, spanned 25,000 square miles (65,000 km^{2}) and held an estimated 400 million individuals. Their homes are adapted to withstand large (above-ground) temperature variation, floods, and fire. Their young are raised in the deepest chambers where the temperature is the most stable.

Many mammals, including raccoons and skunks, seek natural cavities in the ground or in trees to build their nests. Raccoons, and some rodents, use leaves to build nests underground and in trees. Tree squirrels build their nests (dreys) in trees, while voles nest in tall grass. In some species, the nest serve as homes for adults while in others they are used to raise young. The duck-billed platypus and the echidna lay eggs in nests.

Gorillas build fresh nests daily out of leaves and other vegetation in which they sleep at night. They sometimes also build nests during the day for resting in. The smaller species of gorilla build their nests in trees, while the larger are confined to the ground. Nests of the western gorilla, the largest species, measure about 1 metre (3.3 ft) in diameter.

=== Amphibians ===
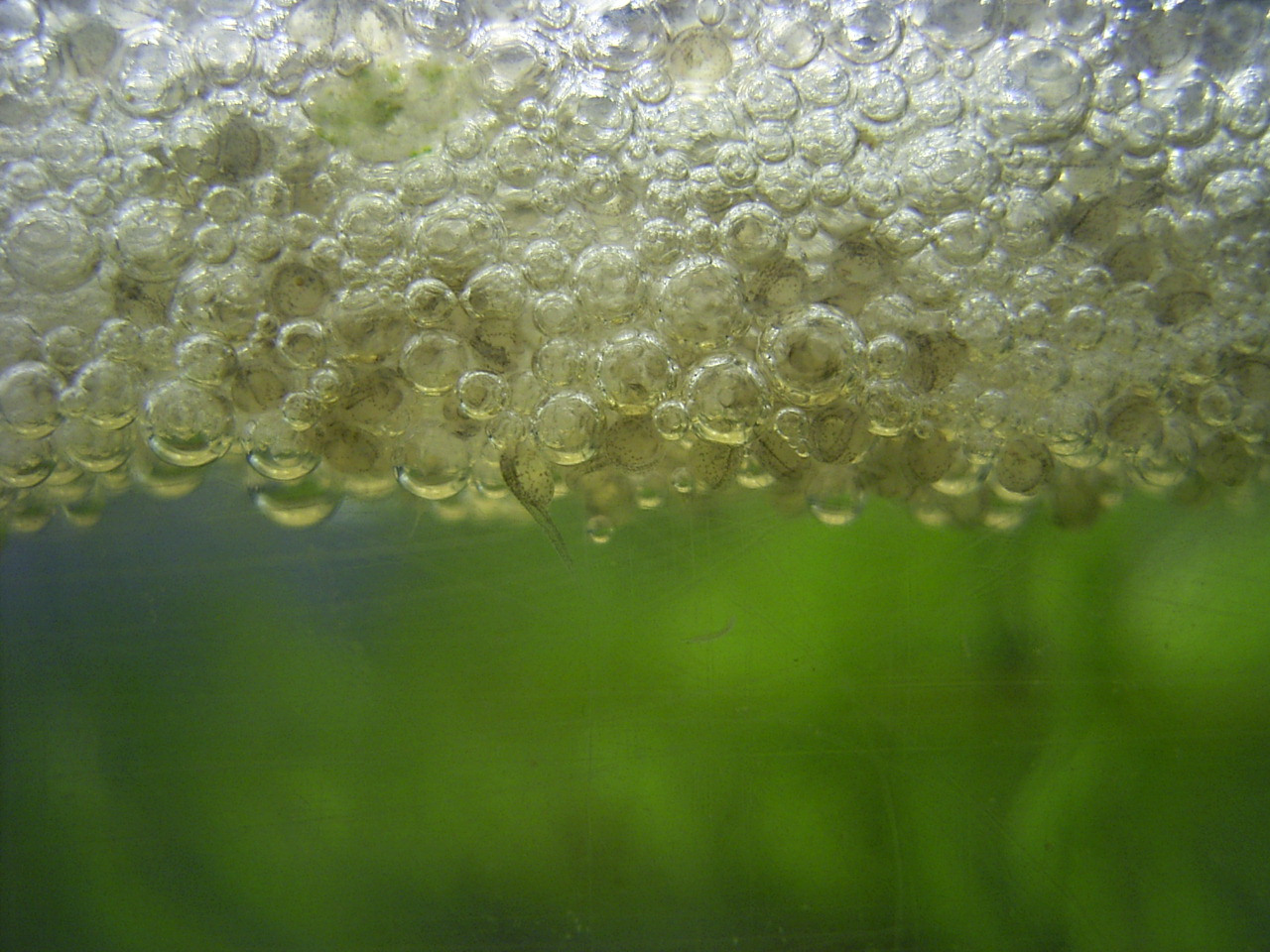
Paradise fish begin to hatch from a bubble nest.

Some species of frog build nests ranging from simple to modest complexity. Many stream-dwelling frogs lay their eggs in a gelatinous mass which they attach to underwater vegetation to prevent eggs from washing away. Nests can have other protective qualities. For example, the female Fletcher frog beats secreted mucus into a froth, creating a structure that serves as a line of defense against thermal extremes, predation, and desiccation.

=== Fish ===
Fish engage in nest building activities ranging from simply scooping out sediment to building enclosed structures out of plant matter. Male sticklebacks produce a special enzyme in their kidneys that they use to bind plants together.

=== Reptiles ===
The American alligator is known for its parenting skills. They build large nests of mud and vegetation on river banks or vegetation mats. The female digs a hole in the center to lay her eggs, covers them, and then guards them for two months until they hatch. When eggs start to hatch, she breaks open the nest which has hardened over time and leads the young to the water where she continues to care for them for another year. Alligators are very particular about their nesting sites and will abandon a site if things go wrong.

Cobras use leaves and other debris to build nests in which they lay eggs that both sexes guard. They carry the vegetation to the nest site by kinking their necks. Sea turtles dig a hole in the sand above the high tide line in which they lay their eggs. They then cover the soft eggs to protect them from the sun and predators and leave.

=== Dinosaurs ===
From the fossil record, it is known that many, or perhaps all, dinosaurs laid eggs. Paleontologists have identified a number of features that allow them to distinguish a nesting site from a random clustering of eggs. Those include regular clustering patterns, the co-occurrence of whole eggs with broken eggs and/or hatchlings, and the occurrence of physical features such as evidence of excavation.

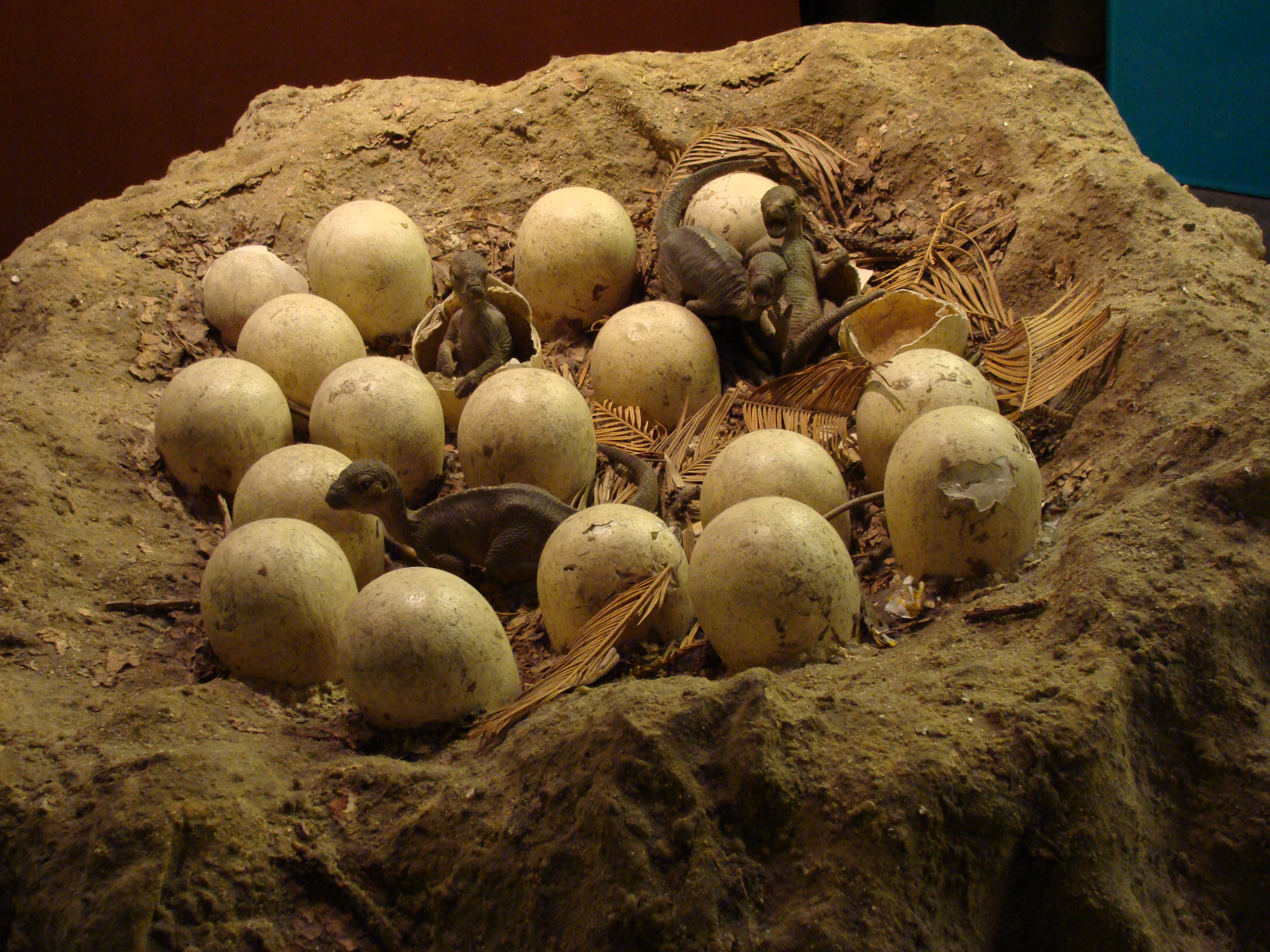
Maiasaura probably exhibited great amounts of parental care.

The Oviraptor nests of Mongolia are perhaps the most famous case of dinosaur nesting. One specimen was found fossilized atop a nest in a brooding posture, proving the animal had been poorly named (Oviraptor means "egg taker").

A site known as Egg Mountain in Montana provides exceptional evidence of dinosaur nesting behavior. The site features dozens of nests each with 20 or more eggs belonging to the Maiasaura. Juvenile teeth at the site exhibit signs of wear, while the leg bones are not developed enough to walk. This allowed scientists to conclude that the species provided extensive parental care for its young. It is likely the species covered its nests with sand and vegetation to keep them warm and nested in colonies for increased protection.

=== Insects ===
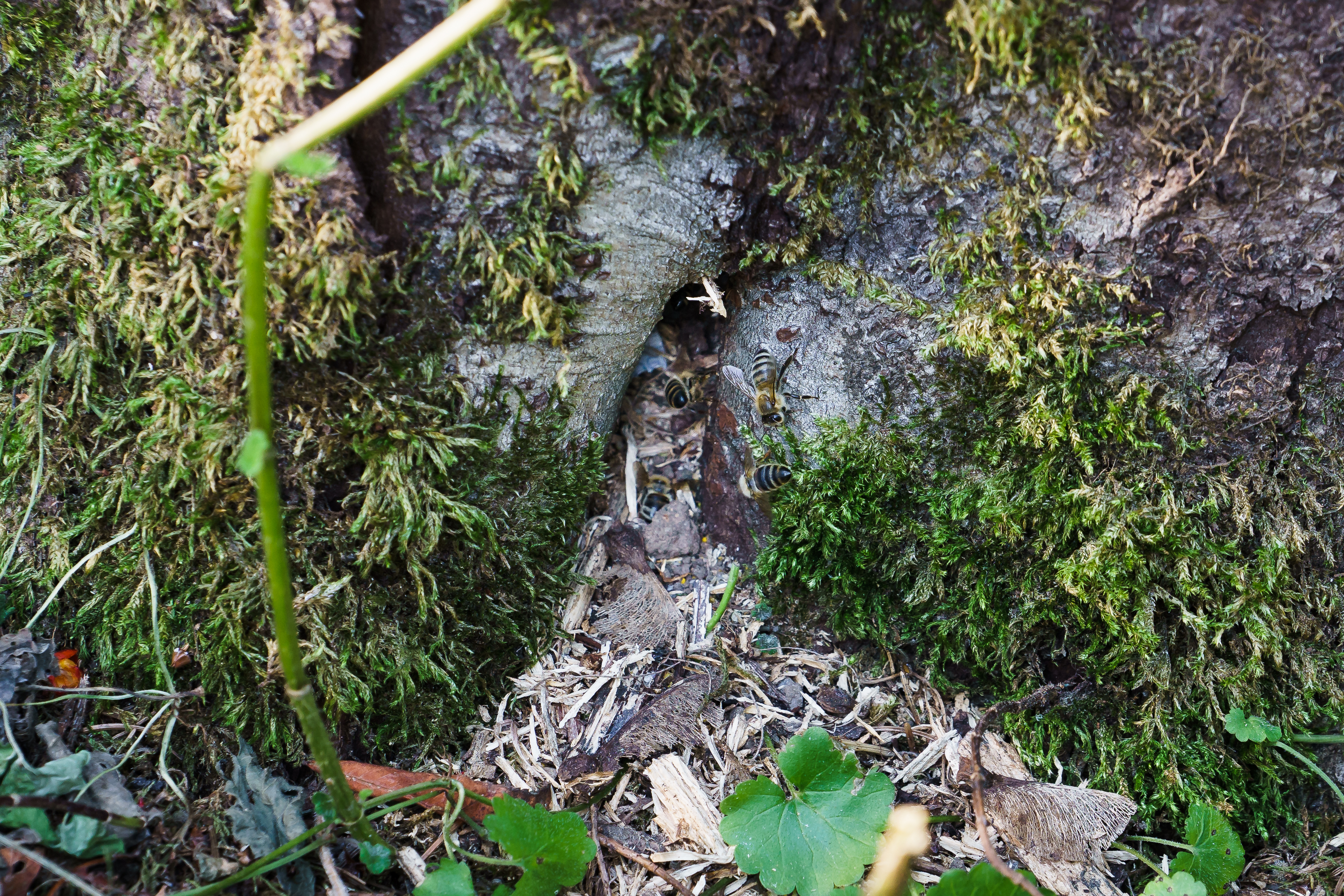
Bee nest in the trunk of a spruce

Social insects, including various bees, wasps, all termites, and most species of ants, are nest builders. Their often elaborate nests may be found above or below ground. Features often include ventilation systems and separate chambers for the queen, her eggs, and developing individuals.

Some types of bees and wasps (e.g., honey bees, bumblebees, yellowjackets, hornets) often seek out natural cavities in which to construct their nests, in which they store food and raise their young. Most other species of bees and aculeate wasps, comprising thousands of solitary-nesting species, dig holes in the ground or burrow into wood or plant stems. In the solitary bee species Megachile rotundata, for example, females construct tubular-shaped nests in rotting wood as well as small holes in the ground, creating brood cells each containing pollen, nectar, and a single egg; each cell is made from pieces cut from plant leaves using the bee's mandibles. Honey bee and bumblebee nests are built using wax the workers secrete from their bodies, while those of various vespid wasps are dependent on their ability to turn plant fiber into paper using their saliva. Nests of highly social species often exhibit structural specialization, with eggs and food stores kept in distinct parts of the hive. Many vespid wasps build nests from paper, where they lay eggs in individual cells, and the wasp larvae are fed by the adults. Different species exhibit different nest structures. Paper wasp nests consist of a single tier of cells, while yellowjacket nests can be many layers thick. Nesting strategies can be plastic, for instance the wasp Parischnogaster mellyi will vary its nest construction based on environmental conditions, and the wasp Mischocyttarus mexicanus is known to nest in groups or alone depending on the distribution of potential nest sites in the area. Nest sizes vary dramatically and the largest wasp nest on record measured 1.75 metres (5.7 ft) in diameter and was 3.7 metres (12 ft) tall. Found in New Zealand, it was likely built by Vespula germanica, an invasive yellowjacket species.

The Eastern carpenter bee, Xylocopa virginica, builds nests in wood, bamboo culms, agave stalks, and other similar materials. When digging the nests, they use the wood shavings scraped from the wall to create partitions within the tunnels. The nest tunnels have about 1-4 branches, each with multiple brood cells. Because they will excavate nests in lumber used by humans in construction, their nesting behavior can weaken wood in manmade structures.

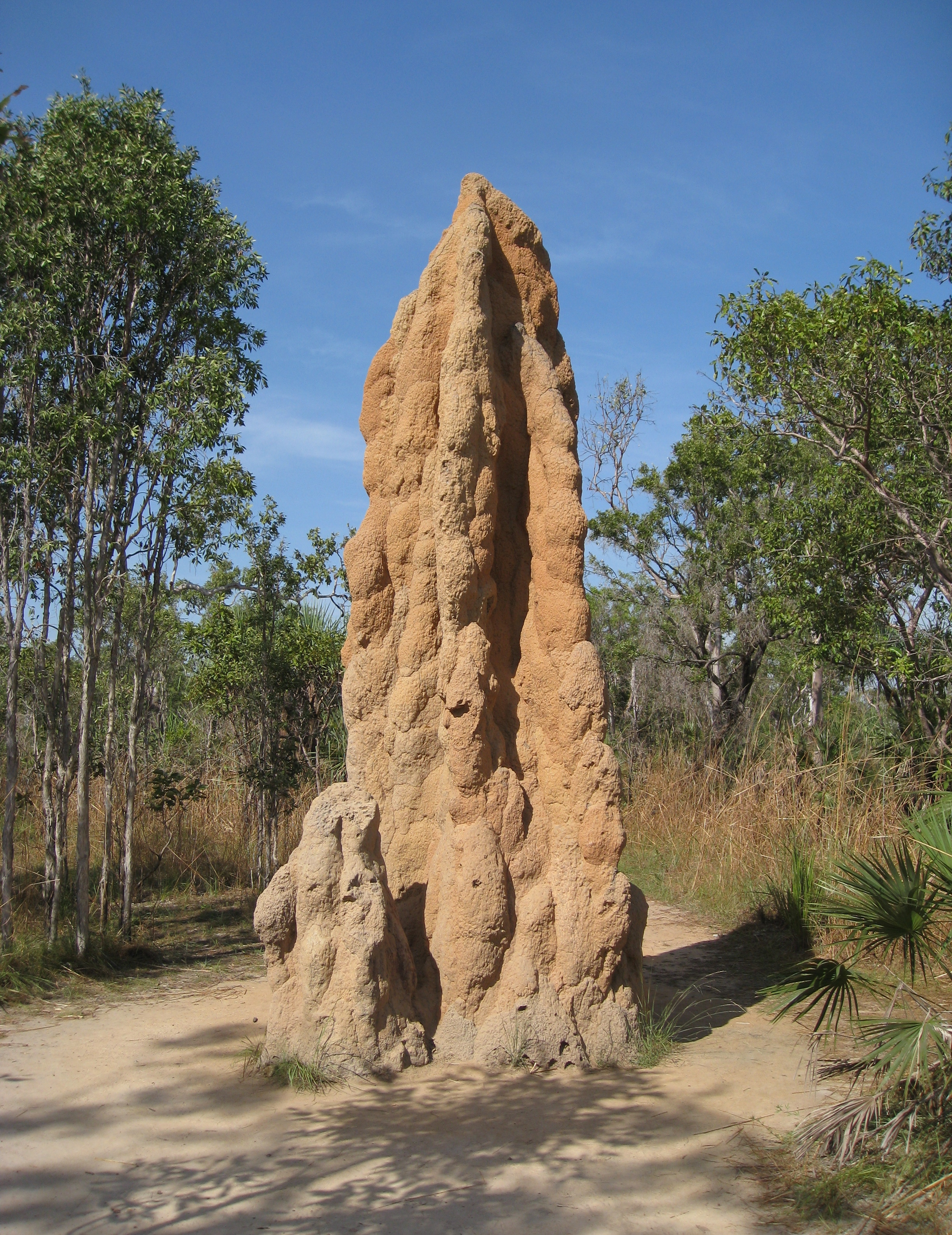
Termite nests can extend 5 metres (16 ft) or more in the air.

Termites build elaborate nests that span multiple generations and may last decades. Using chewed wood, mud, and feces some species build large mounds which may extend well into the air. The largest nests, built by members of the genus Amitermes, stand nearly 7 metres (23 ft) tall with a similar circumference at the base, and host millions of individuals. Termite mounds are constructed to allow for excellent air flow, regulating the mound temperature. The mounds protect against drying and predation allowing many species to lose ancestral traits such as hard bodies, pigmentation, and well-developed eyes. Magnetic termites construct their nests with flattened sides along the north–south axis to ensure maximum warming during the winter, while exposing minimal surface area to the harshest mid-day sun. Other termite species use their nests to farm fungi.

Ant nests are often excavated in soil, and often feature an elaborate internal structure that may extend 2 metres (6.6 ft) or more underground. As the structure gets further underground, individual chambers become farther and farther apart, but individual ants are able to sense the level of carbon dioxide in the soil, and thus be aware of relative depth. Leafcutter ants build a complex nest which can, in some species, house 8 million individuals. The nests feature numerous chambers, most notably garden chambers where they farm fungus on leaves they harvest from the forest.

Species such as some carpenter ants and paper wasps (e.g. Polistes exclamans) build "satellite nests" - smaller nests near, but separate from, the main nest. These satellite nests are used as an insurance against predators and parasites; if the original nest is attacked, surviving members can move to the satellite nest. Other species such as Parischnogaster alternata, construct nests in clusters with the central core composed of older colonies surrounded by younger colonies.

== Effects on other species ==
The abundance of biological resources within the nest has led to a number of specialized predators. The aardvark and the ant eater use long tongues to prey upon termite and ant nests. Birds such as the honey buzzard specialize on wasp and bee nests, a resource also targeted by the tropical hornet. Symbiosis, ranging from feeding on waste to obligate parasitism, is common within the nest. Ant nests alone support symbiotes spanning six classes of arthropods which includes 35 families just from the beetles.

== Names of nests ==
- A badger's nest is called a sett.
- A beaver's nest is called a lodge.
- An eagle's nest is called an eyrie.
- An otter's den is called a holt or a couch.
- A pheasant's nest is called a nide.
- A rabbit's nest is called a form.
- A squirrel's or ringtail possum's nest is called a drey.
- A wasp's nest is called a vespiary.

== See also ==
- Oology
- Bird's nest soup
- Nest box
- Tree house
