= Dog breeding =

Mating selected dogs for specific qualities

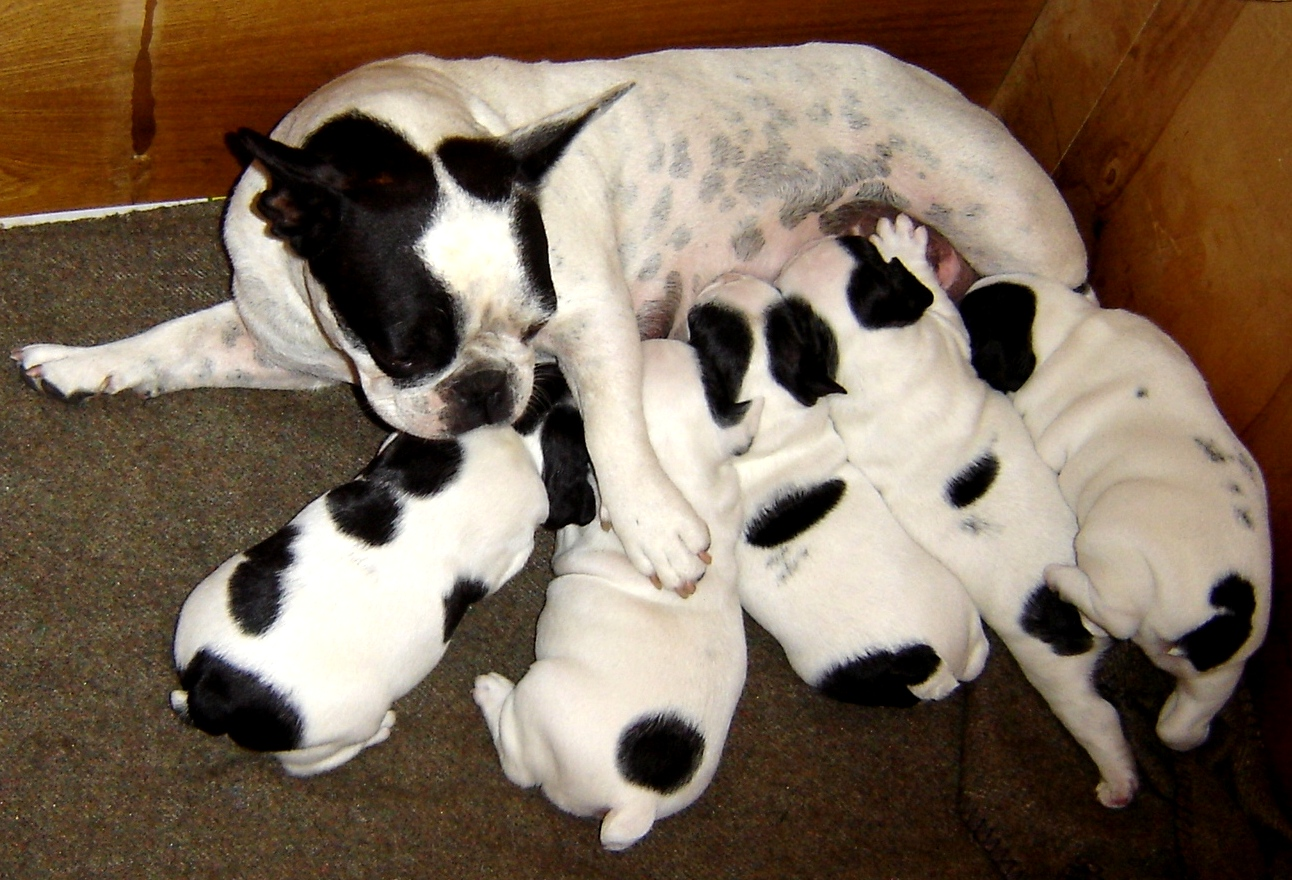
A litter of French Bulldog puppies and their mother

Dog breeding is the practice of mating selected dogs with the intention of maintaining or producing specific qualities and characteristics. When dogs reproduce without such human intervention, their offspring's characteristics are determined by natural selection, while "dog breeding" refers specifically to the artificial selection of dogs, in which dogs are intentionally bred by their owners. Breeding relies on the science of genetics, hence a breeder who is knowledgeable on canine genetics, health, and the intended purpose of the dogs attempts to breed suitable dogs.

== Terminology ==
The female parent of puppies is referred to as the dam and the male parent is referred to as the sire. A litter consists of the puppies born from the same pregnancy. A whelp is a newborn puppy and giving birth to dogs is called whelping. Dogs commonly give birth in a whelping box, a simple box or pen provided to the dam to help shelter and contain the puppies.

A person who intentionally mates dogs to produce puppies is referred to as a dog breeder. Line breeding is the planned breeding of dogs with their relatives. This is done to strengthen the appearance of specific desired traits in offspring. Line breeding is differentiated from inbreeding by excluding pairings between parents and offspring, and between full siblings. Outcrossing is the planned breeding between two unrelated dogs, used to increase genetic diversity in a breed and decrease genetic issues or abnormalities inherited from line breeding or inbreeding.

== Estrous cycle ==
Dogs reach puberty between 6 and 24 months old, at which age female dogs will start having an estrous cycle. There are four stages of estrous: proestrus, estrus, diestrus, and anestrus. A dog in estrus, also known as being "in heat", can become pregnant during this 3- to 21-day period.

== Breeding and gestation ==
Gestation in a dog is 63 days in length, if measured from the day of ovulation. Since it is difficult to determine the exact date of ovulation, errors are often made in calculating gestation period. Canine sperm can live for 10 to 11 days in the fallopian tubes so if a female is bred 10 days before the oocytes (ovum) can be fertilized, she will appear to have a gestation length of 70 days. If she is bred on the day the oocytes can be fertilized, her gestation length will appear to be 60 days long.

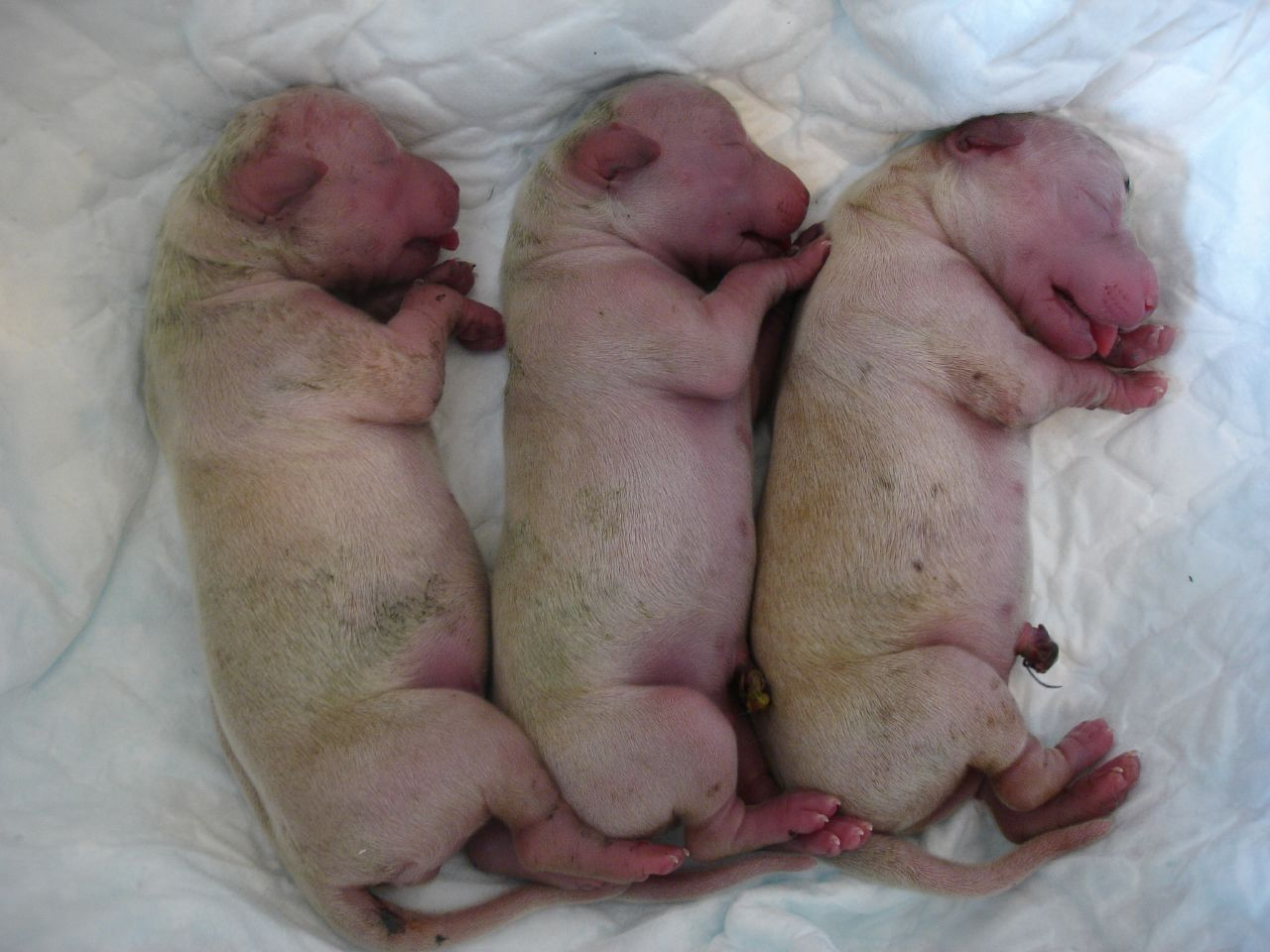
Few hours old

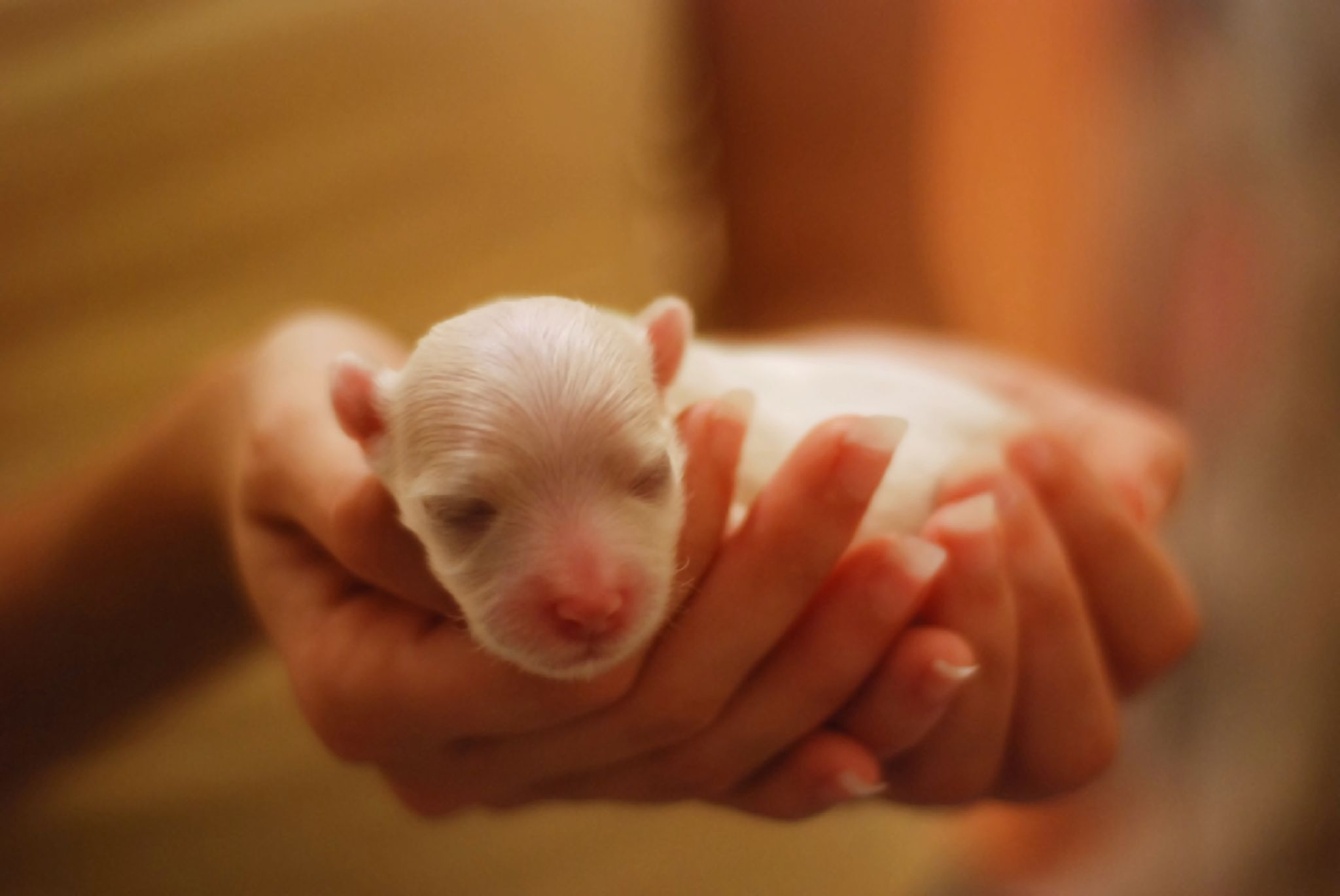
Three days old

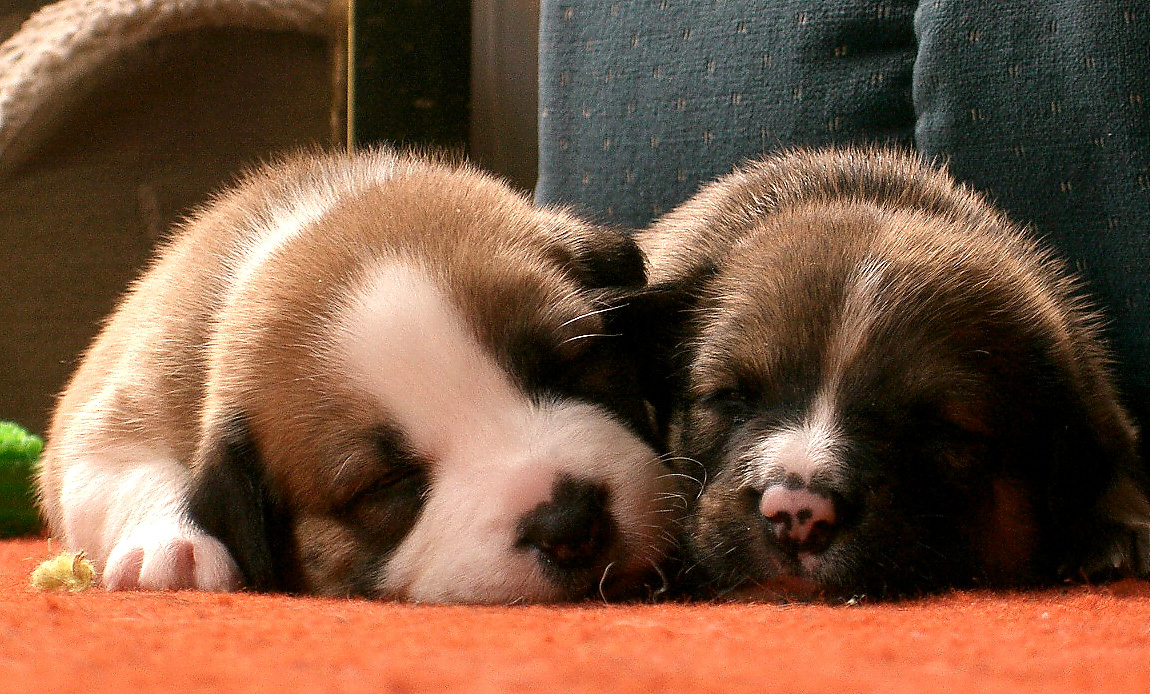
Few weeks old

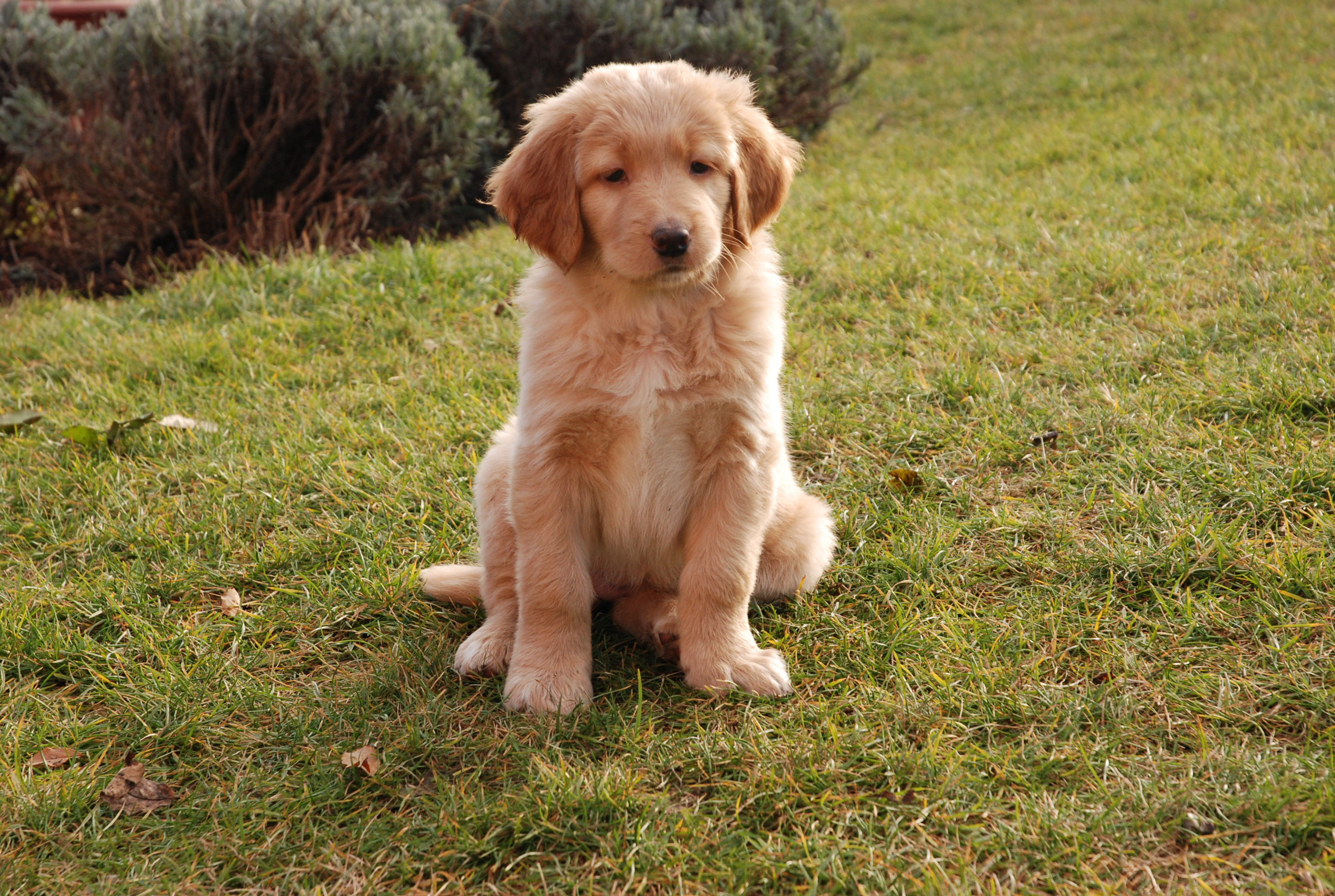
Seven weeks old

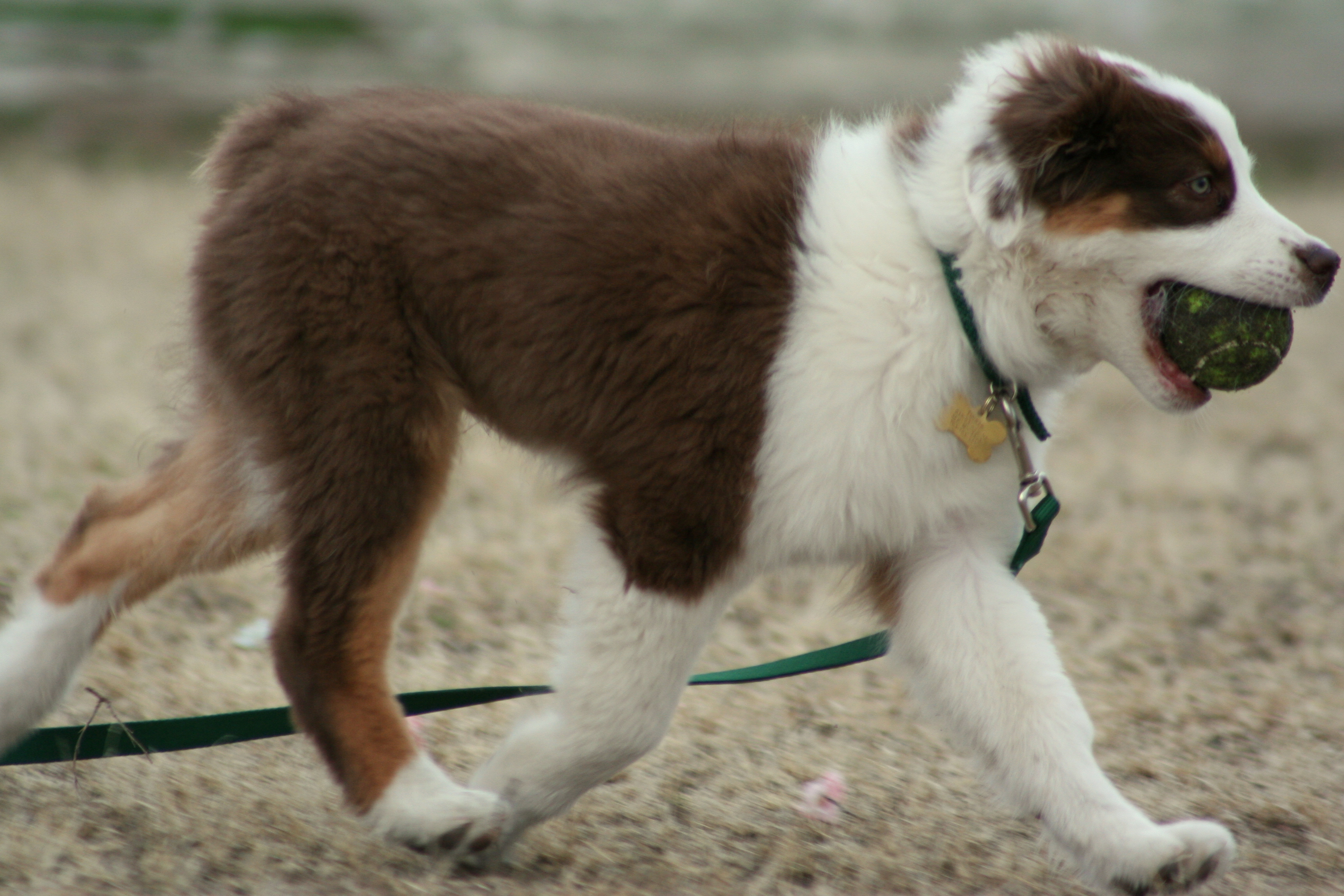
Twelve weeks old

Newborn puppies nursing

== History ==
Humans have maintained populations of useful animals around their places of habitat since pre-historic times. Over these millennia, domesticated dogs have developed into distinct types, or groups, such as livestock guardian dogs, hunting dogs, and sighthounds. To maintain these distinctions, humans have intentionally mated dogs with certain characteristics to encourage those characteristics in the offspring. Through this process, hundreds of dog breeds have been developed. Artificial selection in dog breeding has influenced behavior, shape, and size of dogs.

It is believed that when human civilization moved towards agrarian societies, dogs were selectively bred for smaller size and more docile behavior. These traits made it more comfortable for humans and dogs to live together. It has been seen that these traits can even prompt an adult female wolf to act more defensively of dog puppies than of wolf puppies. The example of canine neoteny goes even further, in that the various dog breeds are differently neotenized according to the type of behavior that was selected. Other researchers believe that because this comparison is based on the grey wolf, which might not be the ancestor of the dog, that this comparison is invalid. Further research indicates that the concept of neoteny as a means of distinguishing dogs from wolves is baseless.

With the development of breed clubs and kennel clubs during the mid-19th century, dog breeding became more rigorous and many breeds were developed during this time. Dog breeding became more systematic to preserve unique mutations such as shortened legs, a shortened face, new fur colors and textures. The increased popularity of dog shows that judged a dog's look more than its working ability led to different goals when breeding. Dogs bred for show rather than performance tended to develop more exaggerated and extreme features to meet breed standards. One example of this change in breeding goals is the pronounced sloped back in the modern German Shepherd breed, compared to the straight back of working pedigrees. The Shar Pei is an example of how differing breed standards can influence the direction breeders take a dog and which traits are exaggerated. The Western Shar Pei has been bred to have a meatier mouth and more wrinkly skin than the traditional Chinese Shar Pei it originated from.

Initially, the ownership of working and purebred dogs, was a privilege of the wealthy. Today many people can afford to buy a dog. There are various reasons for people to breed dogs. Some people may have personal reasons, such as wanting to own or give away puppies, and are not interested in pedigree. Breeders may also breed dogs for profit, for show, because of an interest in a particular breed, or to correct some issue and improve the soundness of a breed. Responsible breeders take into consideration the temperament, as well as the health and appearance of the mating pair before breeding.

Breeders of purebred dogs can register the birth of a litter of puppies to a dog registry associated with a kennel club to record the parentage of the litter in stud books. Such registries maintain records of dogs’ lineage and are usually affiliated with kennel clubs, such as the AKC (American Kennel Club). Maintaining correct data is important for purebred dog breeding. Access to records allows a breeder to analyze the pedigrees and anticipate traits and behaviors that may be passed onto offspring. Requirements for the breeding of registered purebreds vary between breeds, countries, kennel clubs and registries. Breeders have to abide by the rules of the specific organization to participate in its breed maintenance and development programs. The rules may apply to the health of the dogs, such as joint x-rays, hip certifications, and eye examinations; to working qualities, such as passing a special test or achieving at a trial; to general conformation, such as evaluation of a dog by a breed expert. However, many registries, particularly those in North America, are not policing agencies that exclude dogs of poor quality or health. Their main function is simply to register puppies born of parents which are themselves registered.

== Criticism ==
The genetic diversity of modern dog breeds is lower than both modern village dogs and a 5,000-year-old genome from a dog fossil found in Newgrange, Ireland, suggesting that modern breeding practices are partly responsible for the decline. During the early formative years of many breeds, breeders often crossed closely related dogs to create specific phenotypes, resulting in increased incidence of breed-specific genetic diseases.

Some dogs have certain inheritable characteristics that can develop into a disability or disease. There are also widespread misconceptions regarding appropriate breeding age, litter frequency, and long-term health impacts that veterinarians frequently address. Canine hip dysplasia is one such condition. Eye abnormalities, heart conditions, and some cases of deafness have been proven to be inherited. There have been extensive studies of these conditions, commonly sponsored by breed clubs and dog registries, while specialized breed clubs provide information of common genetic defects for their breeds. Also, special organizations such as the Orthopedic Foundation for Animals collect data and provide it to breeders, as well as to the general public. Conditions such as hip dysplasia can impact some breeds more than others.

Some registries, such as American Kennel Club, may include a record of the absence of certain genetic defects, known as a certification, in an individual dog's record. For example, the German Shepherd Dog national breed club in Germany recognizes that hip dysplasia is a genetic defect for dogs of this breed. Accordingly, it requires all dogs to pass evaluation for absence of hip dysplasia to register their progeny, and records the results in individual dog's pedigrees. Many reputable breeders health test according to the breed club guidelines, or OFA guidelines.

There are BBC documentaries titled "Pedigree Dogs Exposed" and "Pedigree Dogs Exposed – Three Years On" that claim health problems in dogs from inbreeding. Some examples are problems with breathing in the Pug breed and Pekingese breed, spinal problems in the Dachshund breed, and Syringomyelia in the Cavalier King Charles Spaniel breed.

Some scientific researchers argue that advances in artificial reproduction technology for the purposes of dog breeding can be helpful, but also have "detrimental impacts" when overused, overriding natural selection principles. These scientists call for a deeper understanding of natural selection, leading to a more naturalistic approach in dog breeding. It was concluded that "findings imply that when selective breeding was done by humans, it squashed the snouts of certain dog breeds, it also morphed their brains."

Animal rights groups such as the International Society for Animal Rights and PETA believe that dog breeding, even by licensed responsible breeders, contributes to the pet overpopulation problem.

== Genetic diversity ==
Domestic dogs are phenotypically diverse mammals shown by differences in morphology and behavior across different breeds. Factors that contribute to this diversity are reproductive isolation, bottlenecks, and genetic drift. Data collected through owner reports suggests that genetic diversity has an effect on dogs' lifespan.

Bottleneck is when a population of dogs reduces sharply and the genetic diversity also reduces. Bottleneck occurred in dogs once they started to get domesticated because humans liked certain genes in dogs, which resulted in isolating genes that were not wanted and the "preferred" genes they wanted were picked when breeding a new litter. That new litter would have those preferred genes, but their genetic diversity was slowly reducing for when they have made their own litter. Creating a bottleneck for a population of dogs can lead to extinction.

== Inbreeding depression ==
Inbreeding depression is the reduced survival and fertility of offspring of related individuals. A study of 42,855 dachshund litters found that as the inbreeding coefficient increased, litter size decreased and the percentage of stillborn puppies increased, thus indicating inbreeding depression.

== See also ==
- Artificial insemination
- Bitch-puppy separation
- List of dog breeds
