= Bitch-puppy separation =

Practice of separating puppies and mothers

Bitch-puppy separation is the practice of separating puppies from their mothers in dog breeding. It is a near-universal practice amongst breeders globally. It is usually done within 8 to 12 weeks.

== Background ==
Female dogs are repeatedly impregnated to keep a steady supply of puppies. Semen collection and artificial insemination can be done by a vet or by the breeder themselves. Veterinarians advise breeders to wait 5-7 months after a dog has given birth before impregnating her again, allowing her body to recover. Veterinarians also advise against impregnating a dog more than 3-4 times in her lifetime. The recommended age to separate puppies from their mothers is no sooner than 8-12 weeks. Breeding facilities that prioritize profit over animal welfare, such as puppy mills, tend to ignore these guidelines.

== Early vs late separation ==
Early separation, or premature separation, is defined as separating puppies from their mothers before eight weeks of age. Premature separation often causes distress for the pups. Puppies separated from their mothers often have behavioral issues, such as chewing, whining, and barking excessively. Premature separation also prevents puppies from learning crucial skills such as bite inhibition, understanding canine communication, and impulse control. Premature separation can also result in puppies failing to get the essential nutrients and antibodies provided by their mother’s milk.

== See also ==
- Artificial insemination, typically used to impregnate dogs
- Queen-kitten separation, the equivalent practice in cats
