= Purebred breeders =

Purebred breeders are dog breeders that intentionally breed purebred dogs specifically to continue the lineage of certain breed characteristics in dogs by mating selected canines.

A purebred dog has the characteristics of the breed to which it belongs, is an offspring of two purebred parents and should be eligible for registry in the purebred association of that breed should it not have any disqualifications such as undesirable color markings.

The motto of a responsible breeder of purebred dogs is to "Breed to Improve", to produce a better dog and quality pet.

== History ==
Animal breeding as an ancient human occupation, can be traced back to domestication and dates back to at least 14 thousand years ago. The modern processes of purebred breeding evolved between the late 18th century and the late 20th century, influenced significantly by eugenics, as well as by increased understanding of genetics.

The dogs were isolated from the larger gene pool of their species and inbreed to maintain certain characteristics. This led to smaller adult sizes compared to their wild counterparts, less acute sight and hearing, and crowding of the teeth. Smaller brains and shorter heads are also a result of neoteny as they carry juvenile characteristics into adulthood. Purebred dogs also tend to mature earlier and have greater fertility. This artificial selection for breeding led to the passing of specific physical characteristics, the creation of distinctive types of dog breeds and the purebred breeders profession.

== Purpose ==
Purebred breeders match parent dogs based on the characteristics they possess and can be improved upon, if the dam has a quality that can be improved on then breeders find a sire that would balance that out. Some of these traits can include cosmetic qualities like size, coat, colors, marks, or other qualities like trainability, temperament, exercise needs and strength.

Every characteristic of a dog has been passed down for hundreds or possibly thousands of generations. Appearance, character and temperament are all traits that are consistent with purebred dogs. Due to the amalgamate ancestry of a mixed-breed dog, traits can be inconsistent from generation to generation, it makes the reliability and predictability of breed characteristics nearly impossible.

Purebred breeds are specialized for different purposes, such as herding, hunting, companionship and service ability. The dogs are often bred to carry specific traits that will allow them to complete the functions they are bred for.

A study in 2004 was able to classify 99% of the dogs under human reproductive control into breed categories based on their DNA sequences. Dogs are grouped into the following eight breed categories of herding, hound, nonsporting, sporting, terrier, toy, working and miscellaneous.

As some health problems are hereditary, knowing the common health problems that are related to the type of dog you are trying to breed can be used to improve its successors by mating the dam with a sire who has a pedigree that lacks these health issues. By studying a dog's pedigree, you can avoid breeding dogs known to carry a dominant or recessive genetic mutation as they could pass this onto their offspring.

== Breeding ==
Most mating done by purebred breeders is linebreeding which is the mating of animals of different families within the same breed to bring in desirable traits that are not present in the original animals. Unlike commercial producers, purebred breeders cannot use crossbreeding as it would dilute the breed's purity, resulting in a mixed breed dog.

Health checks and genetic screenings are done prior to mating as well. The age at which dogs fully mature varies by breed, however there are stringent guidelines that the parents should not be bred until they are mature enough. For example, the AKC does not allow the registration of a litter from a dam whom at the time of mating was less than 8 months of age or more than 12 years, or of a sire that was less than 7 months or more than 12 years of age.

== See also ==
- Animal husbandry
- Breed standard
- Breed type
- Crossbreeding
- Dog
- Dog breed
- Dog Crossbreed/Hybrid
- Dog type
