= Amitermes floridensis =

Scientific classification
- Kingdom: Animalia
- Phylum: Arthropoda
- Class: Insecta
- Order: Blattodea
- Infraorder: Isoptera
- Family: Termitidae
- Genus: Amitermes
- Species: A. floridensis

Binomial name
- Amitermes floridensis Scheffrahn, Su, and Mangold, 1989

Species of termite

Amitermes floridensis, commonly known as the Florida darkwinged subterranean termite, is a species of eusocial insect in the family Termitidae. It feeds on rotting wood, reached by a network of tunnels. It is endemic to west central Florida and was first described in 1989.

== Taxonomy ==
During a survey of termites in Florida in the late twentieth century, a few winged specimens of an unidentified dark-winged termite in the family Termitidae were seen. This family contains around 1600 species but none had previously been found in the eastern United States. In 1988, swarms of these dark-winged termites were seen near the original location and further searches enabled workers of this species to be identified. The species was formally described in 1989 by the Florida entomologists Scheffrahn, Su, and Mangold; they named the new species Amitermes floridensis because it seemed to be restricted to the state of Florida.

== Description ==
Workers are up to 3.5 mm (0.14 in) long. The thorax is constricted and the abdomen inflated, giving them a plump appearance. The head capsule is colourless and the abdomen transparent, so that the gut and its contents can be seen through the cuticle, giving them an overall greyish-colour. Soldiers are a similar size but the larger head capsule is pigmented and armed with black, crescent-shaped mandibles, each with a distinctive tooth on its inner surface. Nymphs develop in mature colonies during the spring; these are larger than the workers, have wider thoraxes and have wing pads. These develop into alates, winged males and females, which are dark brown, with bodies 4 mm (0.16 in) long and a total length with wings of 9 mm (0.35 in). The wings are slender, with dark veins on the leading edge. The queen and king live deep below the ground but have not been observed in this species.

== Distribution and habitat ==
The Florida darkwinged subterranean termite has only been found in west central Florida, particularly around St. Petersburg. Its range extends from Tarpon Springs in the north to Sebring in the east and Punta Gorda in the south. It lives in an underground colony with extensive foraging passages. Where these emerge onto the surface in feeding locations, the above-ground portions are quite short.

== Ecology ==
The termite colony has subterranean chambers and extensive underground foraging passages, rotting timber being the main diet. This species does not form galleries inside timber, but forms tubes along the surface, grazing on the wood, but not rising far above the ground. These tubes have faecal matter incorporated into them and are black. Structures attacked include fallen logs, fence posts, tree trunks, sheds and porches.

Winged reproductives emerge from the nest through special free-standing short "swarm tubes" during the day between July and September. Swarms often occur soon after rainfall, or even before the rain has stopped; the numbers of insects can be very large, resembling columns of smoke issuing from the ground. The insects are weak fliers and many get stuck to wet foliage, buildings or vehicles. Those that return to the ground form pairs and the female searches out a suitable location under a log, stone or debris, in which to start a colony. It may take several years before a colony is large enough to produce its own alates.
