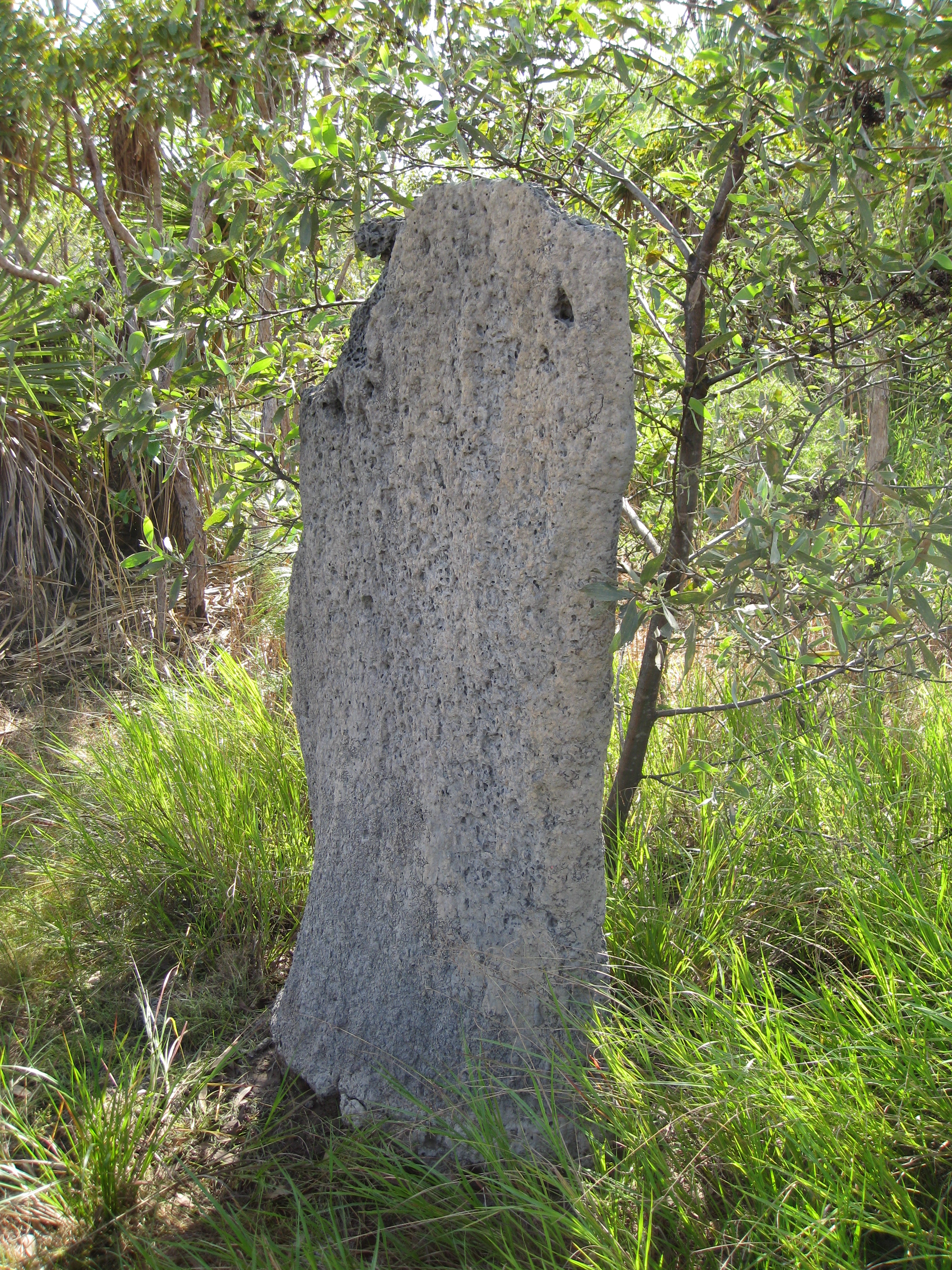
- Mound of the magnetic termite Amitermes meridionalis

Scientific classification
- Domain: Eukaryota
- Kingdom: Animalia
- Phylum: Arthropoda
- Class: Insecta
- Order: Blattodea
- Infraorder: Isoptera
- Family: Termitidae
- Subfamily: Termitinae
- Genus: Amitermes; Silvestri, 1901

Species
- See text

= Amitermes =

Genus of termites

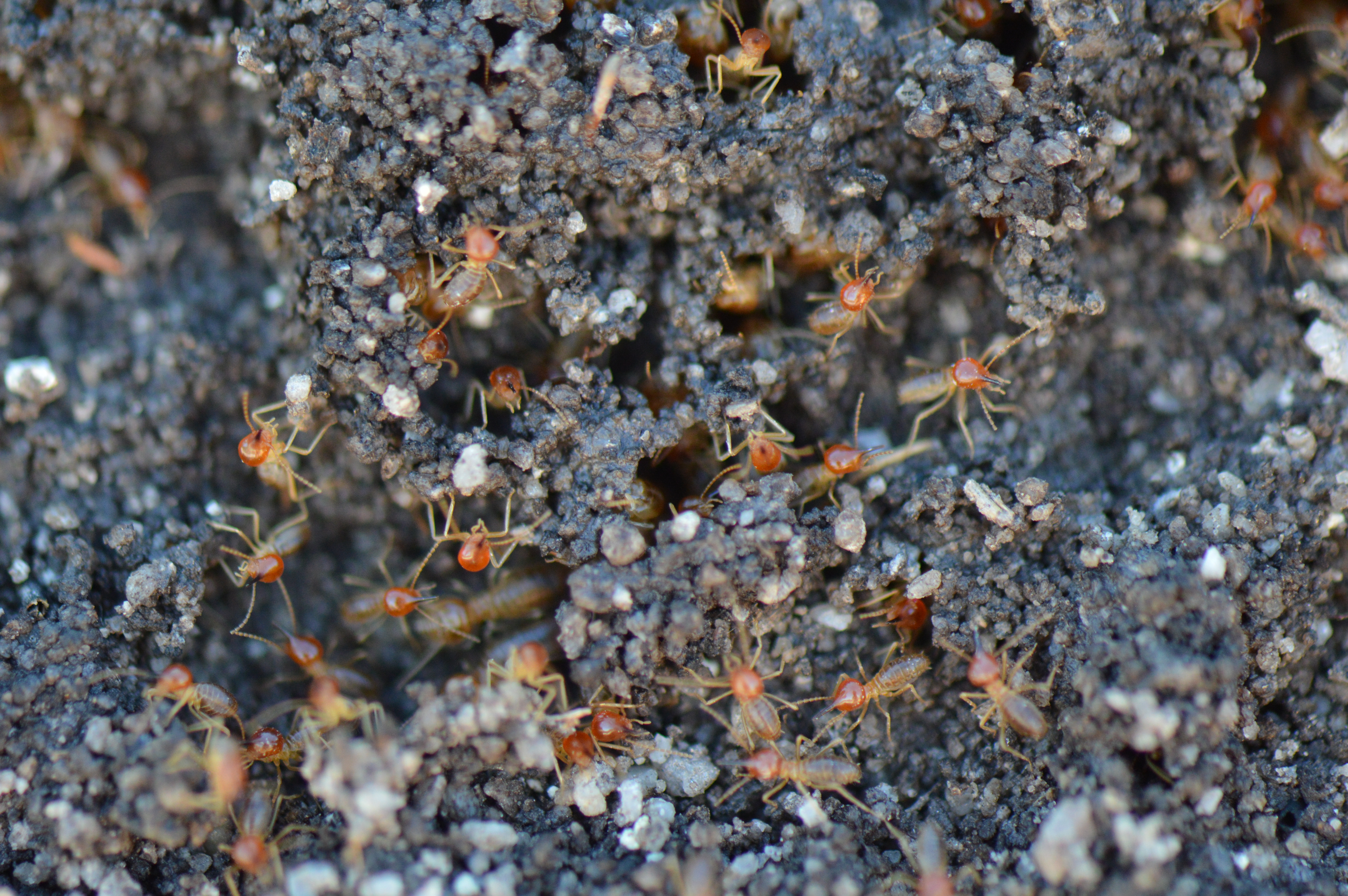
Amitermes hastatus (black mound termites) from the Western Cape region of South Africa repairing a section of their distinctive black mounds. Most of the termites are soldiers.

Amitermes is a genus of termites in the family Termitidae. Species are found in a range of habitats including deserts and rainforests. Characteristics of Amitermes soldiers include a bulbous head, sickle-shaped mandibles with a single tooth on their inner margins and cephalic glands on the front of their heads.

== Species ==
About one hundred species including the following species listed by the Encyclopedia of Life:

- Amitermes beaumonti Banks, 1918
- Amitermes coachellae Light, 1930
- Amitermes conformis
- Amitermes cryptodon Light, 1930
- Amitermes darwini
- Amitermes dentatus
- Amitermes emersoni Light, 1930
- Amitermes ensifer Light, 1930
- Amitermes eucalypti
- Amitermes evuncifer
- Amitermes floridensis Scheffrahn, Su and Mangold, 1989
- Amitermes germanus
- Amitermes hastatus
- Amitermes heterognathus
- Amitermes laurensis
- Amitermes lonnbergianus
- Amitermes meridionalis
- Amitermes minimus Light, 1932
- Amitermes obeuntis
- Amitermes pallidus Light, 1932
- Amitermes parvulus Light, 1932
- Amitermes parvus
- Amitermes silvestrianus Light, 1930
- Amitermes snyderi Light, 1930
- Amitermes vitiosus
- Amitermes wheeleri (Desneux, 1906)
