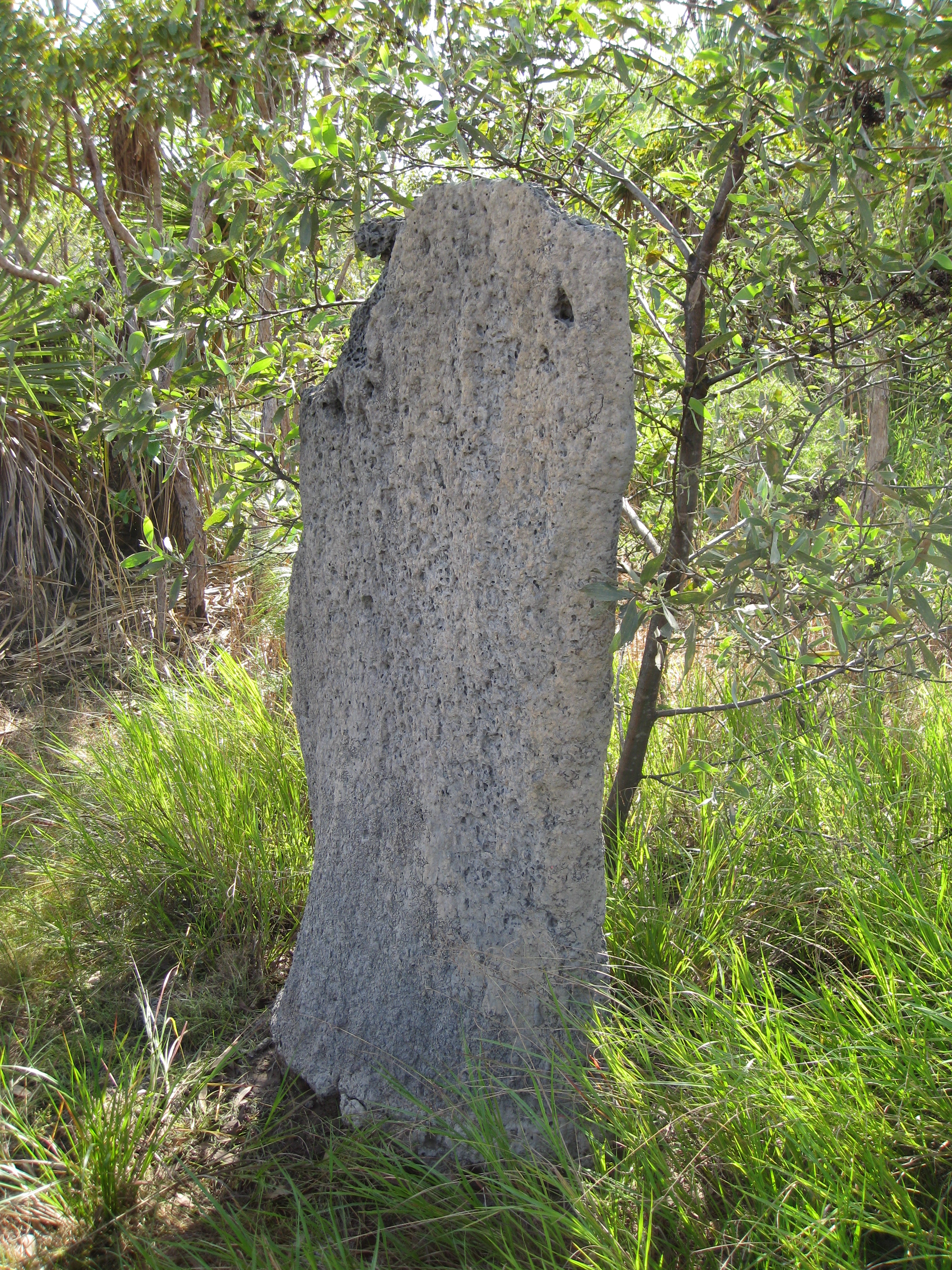
- Mound of the magnetic termite

Scientific classification
- Domain: Eukaryota
- Kingdom: Animalia
- Phylum: Arthropoda
- Class: Insecta
- Order: Blattodea
- Infraorder: Isoptera
- Family: Termitidae
- Genus: Amitermes
- Species: A. meridionalis

Binomial name
- Amitermes meridionalis Froggatt

= Amitermes meridionalis =

Species of termite

Amitermes meridionalis, commonly known as the magnetic termite or compass termite, is a species of eusocial insect in the family Termitidae. It is endemic to northern Australia and the common names derive from the fact that the wedge-shaped mound is aligned with its main axis running north and south.

== Description ==
A large mound may house up to a million individual termites. Each is the nest of a colony of Amitermes meridionalis and houses the queen, king, reproductives, soldiers and workers. The outer surface of the mound is hard and durable whereas the material separating the chambers and galleries inside is more papery. The soldiers are 4 to 6 mm (0.16 to 0.24 in) long and their curved mandibles bear a single in-turned tooth. Many termites never leave the mound and as a result of this protected environment they have thin cuticles, colourless bodies, little sight and little ability to protect themselves.

== Distribution and habitat ==
Amitermes meridionalis is native to the northern part of Northern Territory of Australia, around Darwin. The slab-like mounds are found in low-lying grassland areas that flood during the rainy season. The mounds are often widely scattered, but may be grouped together in a graveyard-like manner.

== Behaviour ==
The mounds built by this termite can be up to 4 m (13 ft) tall, 2.5 m (8 ft 2 in) wide and 1 m (3 ft 3 in) deep. The nests are laterally flattened and are oriented so that they receive the warmth of the sun on their eastern and western sides in the morning and evening while exposing less surface to the sun at midday when the nest might overheat. The interior of the mound is kept at a relatively stable temperature and a high humidity. In the summer, when the land floods, the termites remain safely inside feeding on their stored food supplies. In the dry season, when the water drains away, the surrounding grass senesces and the termites gather the drying grass and other plant material to store as hay in chambers in the mound. Feeding as it does on grass and other vegetation, Amitermes meridionalis is of little economic importance.
