= International Society for Animal Rights =

American not-for-profit corporation

- Type: 501(c)3
- Tax ID no.: 53-0257197
- Headquarters: Clarks Summit, Pennsylvania, United States
- Region served: United States
- Revenue: $975,646 (2015)
- Expenses: $412,270 (2015)

The International Society for Animal Rights (ISAR), formerly known as the National Catholic Society for Animal Welfare and the Society for Animal Rights, is a nonprofit organization based in the District of Columbia, Washington, D.C. ISAR's mission is to advance animal rights through education and legislation.

== History ==
The International Society for Animal Rights was founded by Helen Jones in the District of Columbia in 1959. Jones believed that humans have a moral responsibility toward animals and must work towards ending animal cruelty. Helen Jones, through ISAR, started educational programs and campaigns promoting animal rights, including International Homeless Animals' Day.

Early in her career, Jones strategized to secure rights for animals through public education, legislation, and the American legal system.

The ISAR has campaigned to close zoos, petitioned against simulated abuse of animals, opposed the shooting of feral cats, and condemned celebrities who mistreated animals. Along with other organizations, the ISAR obtained the issuance of a United States spay/neuter postage stamp and advocated for a similar United Nations stamp.

In 1974, ISAR filed the first lawsuit to use the words "animal rights" in both federal and state courts in the United States.

Harvard University's Office of Government and Community Affairs sponsored an in-depth study of the animal rights movement, examining its tactics, strategies, and long-term goals. Harvard observed that there was a conceptual dichotomy in the movement, noting in its report that "philosophically, animal rights and welfare groups can be classified as Abolitionists or regulations. The abolitionists, such as ISAR, constitute a minority within a movement. They are, however, also the most diligent, tactical, and clear-thinking. They use the law, publications, and education to work toward their ultimate goals."

== Programs ==
ISAR engages in various pro-animal rights activities and emphasizes five major programs:

Dog and Cat Overpopulation: ISAR seeks to put an end to all breeding practices that result in the death of unwanted dogs and cats.

International Homeless Animals Day: ISAR created a consciousness-raising memorial for dogs and cats that have been affected by overpopulation. Adoptions are arranged, and spay/neuter procedures are performed.

Education: For decades, ISAR has created and distributed animal rights education materials ranging from understanding the philosophical rationales seeking to justify animal abuse to the humane education of children in their attitude toward animals.

Animal law: Under the direction of Professor Mark Holzer, ISAR is committed to a variety of law-based programs, including legislation, litigation, and monographs.

Billboards: ISAR has created billboards as a means of communicating their safety/neuter message to large numbers of motorists.
