= Whelping box =

Enclosed pen for a dog and puppies

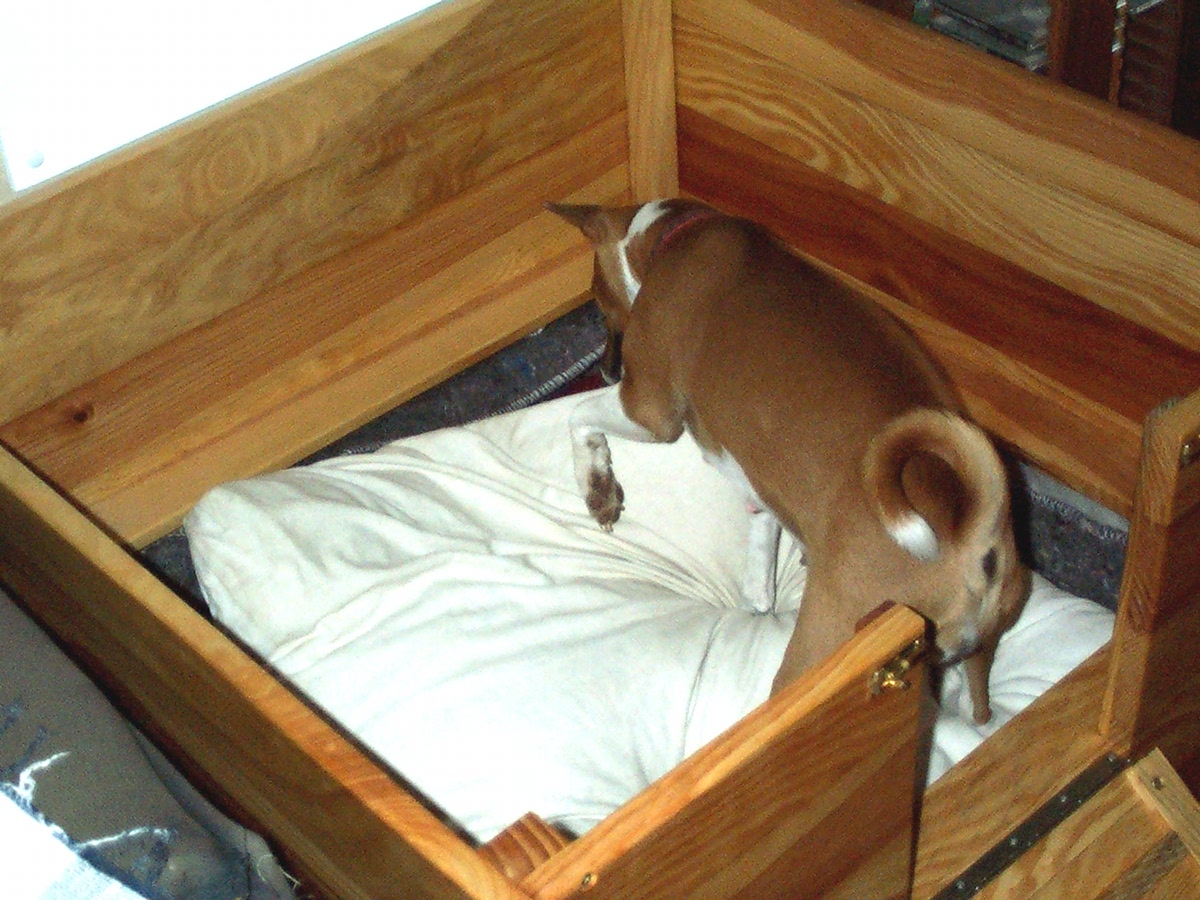
A female dog in her whelping box.

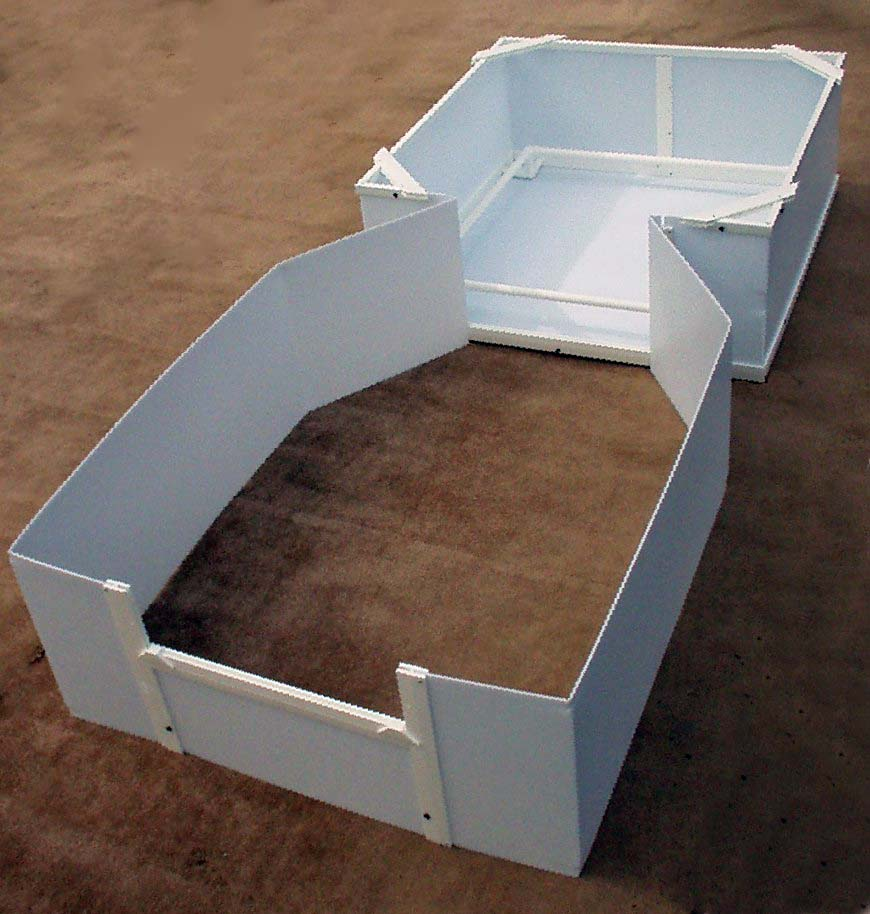
Whelping Box with Extension Wall.

A whelping box/den, also known as a nesting box, whelping den or whelping pen, is designed to protect puppies during birth (whelping) and early life by keeping them safely contained, protected from cold, and safe from the danger of crushing or smothering by the mother.

Whelping boxes vary from improvised cardboard boxes, durable corrugated plastic to purpose built equipment, typically made of plywood or plastic. Desirable features include ease of cleaning and sanitation, extendibility, and toughness. However, there can sometimes not be enough traction, and with the added factor of an unnaturally flat floor, often puppies can develop, and suffer from what is known as hip dysplasia. Also whelping dens exist, which are whelping boxes that are enclosed on top. Commercially available whelping boxes often feature accommodations for accessories such as heat control devices and IP camera attachment.

The sides of the box are designed to be high enough to safely contain the puppies, yet low enough to allow the mother to enter and leave comfortably, with consideration given to her protruding mammary glands. Alternatively, the box is provisioned with a doorway with adjustable height for the same purpose. The bottom of the box may or may not have a floor and may be lined with specially designed "whelping pads," or layers of newspaper (or fabric) to provide insulation from cold floors and to absorb fluids. Fabric covers or partial covers are often used on top to provide a "den-like" environment for the mother. Full covers may be used to prevent puppies from escaping.

Most boxes will include a low railing (termed rails, pig rails, or roll-bars) fixed to the inside perimeter of the box. This is to protect puppies from being crushed or smothered by the mother should she roll over during birthing or while asleep. This is considered especially important with larger dog breeds.
